= Military cabinet of Min Aung Hlaing =

Provisional government of Myanmar from 2021 to 2025

- Cabinet of Myanmar
- 2021–2025
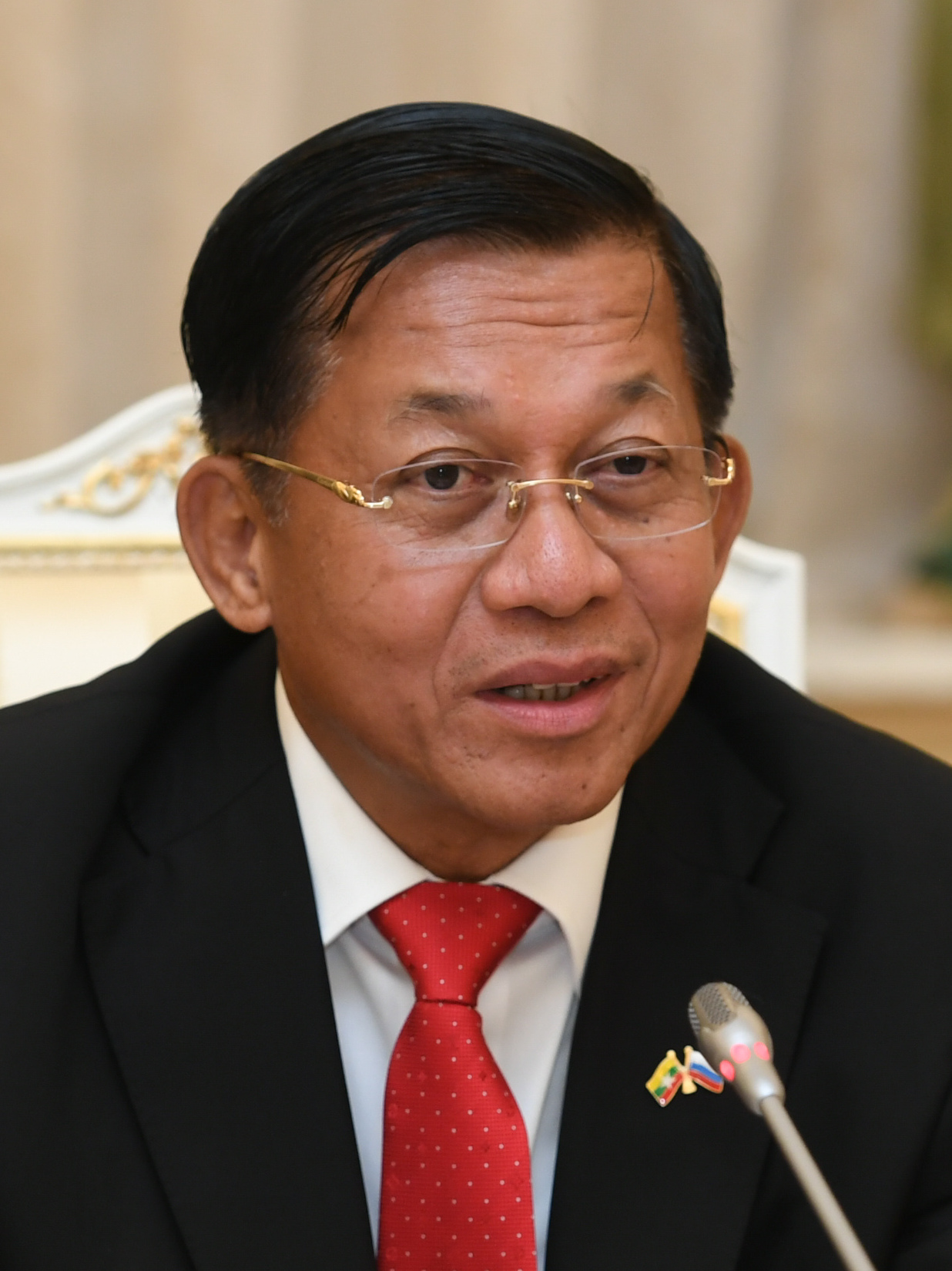
- Prime Minister Min Aung Hlaing
- Date formed: 1 February 2021
- Date dissolved: 31 July 2025

People and organisations
- Chairman of the State Administration Council: Min Aung Hlaing
- President: Myint Swe (acting); Min Aung Hlaing (Note: Pro Tem (On Duty) since 22 July 2024)
- Vice-Chairman of the State Administration Council: Soe Win
- Prime Minister: Min Aung Hlaing
- Deputy Prime Minister: Soe Win, Mya Tun Oo, Tin Aung San, Soe Htut, Win Shein, and Than Swe
- Commander-in-Chief of Defence Services: Min Aung Hlaing
- Member parties: Union Solidarity and Development Party; People's Pioneer Party; Tatmadaw; Independents
- Status in legislature: Legislature dissolved (Legislation power transferred to the Chairman of the State Administration Council)

History
- Incoming formation: 2021 Myanmar coup d'état
- Predecessor: Cabinet of Win Myint
- Successor: Cabinet of Nyo Saw

The Provisional Government of the Republic of the Union of Myanmar (Burmese: ပြည်ထောင်စုသမ္မတမြန်မာနိုင်ငံတော် အိမ်စောင့်အစိုးရ), was a provisional government for Myanmar appointed by the State Administration Council. On 1 August 2021, it replaced the Management Committee of the State Administration Council, which had been in place since 19 February 2021, following the 2021 Myanmar coup d'état. Some ministers were appointed by Min Aung Hlaing immediately following the coup on 1 February, in his capacity as Commander-in-Chief of Defence Services exercising emergency powers.

Due to the state of emergency, the cabinet was led by Prime Minister Min Aung Hlaing rather than Acting President Myint Swe, despite the president being the constitutional head of government.

The legitimacy of the SAC appointed provisional government has been challenged by the Committee Representing Pyidaungsu Hluttaw (CRPH) which has appointed a rival National Unity Government of Myanmar (NUG).

The provisional government was dissolved with the conclusion of the state of emergency at the end of July 2025, and the National Defence and Security Council appointed Nyo Saw to lead a new union government.

== Background ==
The 2021 coup came in the aftermath of the general election on 8 November 2020, in which the National League for Democracy won 396 out of 476 seats in parliament, an even larger margin of victory compared to that in the 2015 election. The military's proxy party, the Union Solidarity and Development Party, won only 33 seats.

The army disputed the results, claiming that the vote was fraudulent. The coup attempt had been rumored for several days, prompting statements of concern from Western powers such as France, the United States, and Australia.

On the morning of 1 February 2021, President Win Myint, State Counsellor Aung San Suu Kyi, as well as several Union Ministers, State and Region Chief Ministers, State and Region Ministers, and elected MPs, were detained by the military. Since then, the State Administration Council has governed the country. The military deposed the elected civilian government and General Min Aung Hlaing, the commander-in-chief of Defence Services, announced the formation of a caretaker government with himself as prime minister and extended military rule through 2023, state media reported on 1 August 2021.

This caretaker government is the second in Burmese history since independence.

== Government Reshuffle ==
=== September 2023 reshuffle ===
- On 25 September 2022, Deputy Prime Minister and Union Minister for Union Government Office 1 Lt-Gen Soe Htut was discharged to original military duties on 25 September 2023 under Order 86/2023.
- Union Minister for Commerce U Aung Naing Oo was appointed as Union Minister for Union Government Office 1 under Order 87/2023.
- U Tun Ohn was appointed Union Minister for Commerce under Order 88/2023.
- Under Order 89/2023, Union Election Commission member U Bran Shaung and Deputy Minister for Commerce U Nyunt Aung allowed to retire from duties.
- Under Order 90/2023, U Khin Aung was appointed member of the Union Election Commission.
- Under Order 91/2023, SAC appointed U Lwin Oo as Deputy Minister for Foreign Affairs and U Min Min as Deputy Minister for Commerce.

== Cabinet ==
The Provisional Government comprises the following persons:

1. State Prime Minister (also serves as the Chairman of the State Administration Council)
2. Deputy Prime Minister (also serves as the vice-chairman of the State Administration Council)
3. Union Ministers (29 ministers, as of 1 September 2021)
4. Attorney General of the Union (also serves as the Union Minister for Legal Affairs),
5. Permanent Secretary, Office of the Provisional Government
6. Ministry of the State Administration Council Chairman's Office

== National Security and Peace Commission ==
On 31 July 2025, Min Aung Hlaing ended the state of emergency. The National Security and Peace Commission and Union Government formed, with its members appointed by Min Aung Hlaing himself. Junta propaganda hailed this change as a step towards multi-party democracy.

== Head and deputy head ==
| Office | Name | Term in office | | |
| Office | Name | Took office | Left office | Days |
|---|---|---|---|---|
| Chairman of the State Administration Council | Min Aung Hlaing | 2 February 2021 | Incumbent | 1894 |
| Acting President of Myanmar | Min Aung Hlaing | 22 July 2024 | Incumbent | 628 |
| Prime Minister of Myanmar | Min Aung Hlaing | 1 August 2021 | Incumbent | 1714 |
| Vice Chairman of the State Administration Council | Soe Win | 2 February 2021 | Incumbent | 1894 |
| Deputy Prime Minister of Myanmar | Soe Win | 1 August 2021 | Incumbent | 1714 |
| Deputy Prime Minister of Myanmar | Mya Tun Oo | 1 February 2023 | Incumbent | 1165 |
| Deputy Prime Minister of Myanmar | Tin Aung San | 1 February 2023 | Incumbent | 1165 |
| Deputy Prime Minister of Myanmar | Win Shein | 1 February 2023 | Incumbent | 1165 |
| Deputy Prime Minister of Myanmar | Soe Htut | 1 February 2023 | 25 September 2023 | 236 |

== Union Ministers ==
Cabinet members
| Portfolio | Minister | Took office | Left office | Party |
|---|---|---|---|---|
| Union Minister for Defence | General Mya Tun Oo | 1 February 2021 | 3 August 2023 | Tatmadaw |
| Union Minister for Defence | Admiral Tin Aung San | 3 August 2023 | Incumbent | Tatmadaw |
| Union Minister for Home Affairs | Lieutenant General Soe Htut | 1 February 2021 | 3 August 2023 | Tatmadaw |
| Union Minister for Home Affairs | Lieutenant General Yar Pyae | 3 August 2023 | Incumbent | Tatmadaw |
| Union Minister for Foreign Affairs | Wunna Maung Lwin | 1 February 2021 | 1 February 2023 | USDP |
| Union Minister for Foreign Affairs | Than Swe | 1 February 2023 | Incumbent | |
| Union Minister at the State Administration Council Chairman's Office Ministry (1) | Ko Ko Hlaing | 8 January 2024 | 5 May 2024 | Independent |
| Union Minister at the State Administration Council Chairman's Office Ministry (1) | Admiral Moe Aung | 5 May 2024 | Incumbent | Tatmadaw |
| Union Minister at the State Administration Council Chairman's Office Ministry (2) | Aung Naing Oo | 8 January 2024 | 5 May 2024 | Independent |
| Union Minister at the State Administration Council Chairman's Office Ministry (2) | Ko Ko Hlaing | 5 May 2024 | Incumbent | Independent |
| Union Minister at the State Administration Council Chairman's Office Ministry (3) | Aung Kyaw Hoe | 22 January 2024 | Incumbent | Independent |
| Union Minister at the State Administration Council Chairman's Office Ministry (4) | Admiral Moe Aung | 8 January 2024 | 5 May 2024 | Tatmadaw |
| Union Minister at the State Administration Council Chairman's Office Ministry (4) | Aung Naing Oo | 5 May 2024 | 27 May 2024 | Independent |
| Minister of Border Affairs | Lieutenant General Tun Tun Naung | 1 February 2021 | Incumbent | Tatmadaw |
| Minister of Planning and Finance | Win Shein | 1 February 2021 | Incumbent | Independent |
| Minister of Investment and Foreign Economic Relations | Aung Naing Oo | 1 February 2021 | 19 August 2022 | Independent |
| Minister of Investment and Foreign Economic Relations | Dr Kan Zaw | 19 August 2022 | Incumbent | Independent |
| Minister of International Cooperation | Ko Ko Hlaing | 1 February 2021 | Incumbent | Independent |
| Attorney General and Minister of Legal Affairs | Thida Oo | 2 February 2021 and 30 August 2021 | Incumbent | Independent |
| Minister of Information | Chit Naing | 1 February 2021 | 1 August 2021 | Independent |
| Minister of Information | Maung Maung Ohn | 1 August 2021 | Incumbent | Independent |
| Minister of Religious Affairs and Culture | Ko Ko | 1 February 2021 | Incumbent | Independent |
| Minister of Agriculture, Livestock and Irrigation | Tin Htut Oo | 3 February 2021 | 1 February 2023 | Independent |
| Minister of Agriculture, Livestock and Irrigation | Min Naung | 1 February 2023 | Incumbent | |
| Minister of Cooperative and Rural Development | Hla Moe | 24 June 2021 | Incumbent | Independent |
| Minister of Transport and Communications | Admiral Tin Aung San | 3 February 2021 | 3 August 2023 | Tatmadaw |
| Minister of Transport and Communications | General Mya Tun Oo | 3 August 2023 | Incumbent | Tatmadaw |
| Minister of Natural Resources and Environmental Conservation | Khin Maung Yee | 2 February 2021 | Incumbent | Independent |
| Minister of Electric Power | Thaung Han | 2 May 2022 | Incumbent | Independent |
| Minister of Energy | Thaung Han | 2 May 2022 | 5 August 2022 | Independent |
| Minister of Energy | Myo Myint Oo | 5 August 2022 | Incumbent | Independent |
| Minister of Industry | Charlie Than | 22 May 2021 | Incumbent | Independent |
| Minister of Immigration and Population (former MOLIP) | Khin Yi | 1 August 2021 | 19 August 2022 | USDP |
| Minister of Immigration and Population (former MOLIP) | Myint Kyaing | 19 August 2022 | Incumbent | Independent |
| Minister of Labour (former MOLIP) | Myint Kyaing | 1 February 2021 | 19 August 2022 | Independent |
| Minister of Labour (former MOLIP) | Dr Pwint San | 19 August 2022 | Incumbent | Independent |
| Minister of Commerce | Pwint San | 3 February 2021 | 19 August 2022 | Independent |
| Minister of Commerce | Aung Naing Oo | 19 August 2022 | 24 September 2023 | Independent |
| Minister of Commerce | Tun Ohn | 25 September 2023 | Incumbent | Independent |
| Minister of Education | Nyunt Pe | 16 February 2021 | Incumbent | Independent |
| Minister of Science and Technology | Myo Thein Kyaw | 17 June 2021 | Incumbent | Independent |
| Minister of Health (former Health and Sports) | Thet Khaing Win | 1 February 2021 | Incumbent | Independent |
| Minister of Sports and Youth Affairs | Min Thein Zan | 1 August 2021 | Incumbent | Independent |
| Minister of Construction | Shwe Lay | 2 February 2021 | 1 February 2023 | Independent |
| Minister of Construction | Myo Thant | 1 February 2023 | Incumbent | |
| Minister of Social Welfare, Relief and Resettlement | Thet Thet Khine | 4 February 2021 | 2 August 2023 | PPP |
| Minister of Social Welfare, Relief and Resettlement | Dr Soe Win | 3 August 2023 | Incumbent | Independent |
| Minister of Hotels and Tourism | Maung Maung Ohn | 7 February 2021 | 5 August 2021 | Independent |
| Minister of Hotels and Tourism | Htay Aung | 5 August 2021 | 1 February 2023 | Independent |
| Minister of Hotels and Tourism | Aung Thaw | 1 February 2023 | 2 August 2023 | Independent |
| Minister of Hotels and Tourism | Thet Thet Khine | 3 August 2023 | Incumbent | PPP |
| Minister of Ethnic Affairs | Saw Tun Aung Myint | 3 February 2021 | 1 February 2023 | Independent |
| Minister of Ethnic Affairs | Jeng Phang Naw Taung | 1 February 2023 | Incumbent | |
| Minister of Electricity and Energy (dissolved) | Aung Than Oo | 8 February 2021 | 2 May 2022 | Independent |

== See also ==
- State Administration Council
- Chairman of the State Administration Council
- Ministry of the State Administration Council Chairman's Office
