= List of cabinet members of State Administration Council =

This is a list of senior government officials, appointed by State Administration Council (SAC) following the February 2021 coup d'état. It typically includes military (also known as Tatmadaw) leaders and followers from various opposing parties of former government party of civilian leader, Aung San Suu Kyi. The event is well-known as 2021 Myanmar coup d'état.

== List ==
List of high-ranking officials
No.	Name	Political Party	Party Role	Government Office	Took office
1.	Min Aung Hlaing	Military	Commander-in-Chief	Chairman of State Administration Council	1 February 2021
2.	Myint Swe	USDP	Lieutenant General	Acting President	1 February 2021
3.	Than Swe	USDP		Counsellor	1 February 2021
4.	Wunna Maung Lwin	USDP	Central Executive Committee Member	Minister of Foreign Affairs	1 February 2021
5.	Soe Htut	Military	Lieutenant General	Minister of Home Affairs	1 February 2021
6.	Mya Tun Oo	Military	General	Minister of Defence	1 February 2021
7.	Tun Tun Naung	Military	Lieutenant General	Minister of Border Affairs	1 February 2021
8.	Win Shein	Military	Officer	Minister of Planning, Finance and Industry	1 February 2021
9.	Aung Naing Oo	Military	Officer	Minister of Investment and Foreign Economic Relations	1 February 2021
10.	Ko Ko Hlaing	Military	Officer-Cum-Chief Political Adviser	Minister of International Cooperation	1 February 2021
11.	Chit Naing			Minister of Information	1 February 2021
12.	Ko Ko			Minister of Religious Affairs	1 February 2021
13.	Myint Kyaing			Minister of Labor, Immigration and Public Affairs	1 February 2021
14.	Thet Khaing Win			Minister of Health and Sports	1 February 2021
15.	Than Swe			Chairman of Union Civil Services Board	1 February 2021
16.	Yar Pyae	Military	Lieutenant General	Chairman	1 February 2021
17.	Sein Win	Military	Lieutenant General	Member	1 February 2021
18.	Ye Aung	Military	Lieutenant General	Member	1 February 2021
19.	Tin Maung Win	Military	Lieutenant General	Member	1 February 2021
20.	Min Naung	Military	Lieutenant General	Member	1 February 2021
21.	Aye Win	Military	Lieutenant General	Member	1 February 2021
22.	Aung Lin Dwe	Military	Lieutenant General	Secretary	1 February 2021
23.	Soe Win	Military	Deputy Commander-in-Chief	Vice Chairman of State Administration Council	2 February 2021
24.	Mya Tun Oo	Military	Chief General	Member of State Administrative Council	2 February 2021
25.	Tin Aung San	Military	Chief General	Member of State Administrative Council	2 February 2021
26.	Maung Maung Kyaw	Military	Chief General	Member of State Administrative Council	2 February 2021
27.	Moe Myint Tun	Military	Chief General	Member of State Administrative Council	2 February 2021
28.	P'doh Mahn Nyein Maung	Military	Chief General	Member of State Administrative Council	2 February 2021
29.	Thein Nyunt	Military	Chief General	Member of State Administrative Council	2 February 2021
30.	Khin Maung Swe			Member of State Administrative Council	2 February 2021
31.	Ye Win Oo	Military	Lieutenant General	Joint Secretary of State Administrative Council	2 February 2021
32.	Dr. Thidar Oo		Permanent Secretary of Union Attorney General	Union Attorney General	2 February 2021
33.	Dr. Kan Zaw	USDP	Former Head Professor of Economic University	Union Auditor General	2 February 2021
34.	Soe Tint Naing		Deputy Minister of Home Affairs	Deputy Minister of Union Governance Office Ministry	2 February 2021
35.	Than Hlaing	Military	Lieutenant General	Police Lieutenant General and Deputy Minister of Home Affairs	2 February 2021
36.	Thein Soe			Chairman of Union Electoral Commission	2 February 2021
37.	Thaung Tin			Member of Union Electoral Commission	2 February 2021
38.	Than Tun			Member of Union Electoral Commission	2 February 2021
39.	U Kyauk			Member of Union Electoral Commission	2 February 2021
40.	Aung San Win			Member of Union Electoral Commission	2 February 2021
41.	Than Win			Member of Union Electoral Commission	2 February 2021
42.	Than Nyein		Former Central Bank Governor Under U Thein Sein's Government	Central Bank Governor	2 February 2021
43.	Khin Maung Yee		Secretary for Natural Resources and Environmental Conservation Ministry	Minister of Natural Resources and Environmental Conservation	2 February 2021
44.	Shwe Lay		Secretary for Construction Ministry	Minister of Construction	2 February 2021
45.	Dr. Maung Maung Naing			Chairman of Nay Pyi Taw Council	2 February 2021
46.	Tun Tun Win			Chairman of 'Naga' Self-Administered Division and Zone	2 February 2021
47.	Arkar Lin			Chairman of 'Danu' Self-Administered Division and Zone	2 February 2021
48.	Khun Ye Htwe			Chairman of 'Pa-O' Self-Administered Division and Zone	2 February 2021
49.	Tar Thein Zaw			Chairman of 'PaLaung' Self-Administered Division and Zone	2 February 2021
50.	Myint Swe			Chairman of 'KoKang' Self-Administered Division and Zone	2 February 2021
51.	Nyi Nup			Chairman of 'Wa' Self-Administered Division and Zone	2 February 2021
52.	Aye Nu Sein	Arakan National Party (ANP)	Lawyer-Cum-Politician and Spokesperson	Member of State Administrative Council	3 February 2021
53.	Jeng Phang Naw Taung			Member of State Administrative Council	3 February 2021
54.	Maung Har	Myanmar Economic Bank	Former Manager	Member of State Administrative Council	3 February 2021
55.	Sai Lone Hseng	USDP	Former Shan State Speaker	Member of State Administrative Council	3 February 2021
56.	Saw Daniel	Kayah State Democratic Party (KySDP)	Vice Chairman	Member of State Administrative Council	3 February 2021
57.	Tin Htut Oo			Minister of Agriculture, Livestock and Irrigation	3 February 2021
58.	Tin Aung San			Minister of Transport and Communication	3 February 2021
59.	Dr. Pwint San			Minister of Commerce	3 February 2021
60.	Saw Tun Aung Myint			Minister of Ethnic Affairs	3 February 2021
61.	Zaw min		Acting Manager of Prison Department	Senior Manager of Prison Department	3 February 2021
62.	Maung Maung Win			Deputy Minister of Planning and Finance	4 February 2021
63.	Than Than Lin			Deputy Minister of Planning and Finance	4 February 2021
64.	Win Thaw			Vice Chairman of Central Bank	4 February 2021
65.	Than Than Swe			Vice Chairman of Central Bank	4 February 2021
66.	Dr. Thet Thet Khine	People's Pioneer Party (PPP)	Chairman	Union Minister of Social Welfare, Relief and Resettlement	4 February 2021
67.	Myo Maung			High Court Chief of Sagaing	4 February 2021
68.	Kyi Thein			High Court Chief of Mandalay	4 February 2021
69.	Zaw Min Tun	Military	Major General	Leader of National Executive Management Council	5 February 2021
70.	Thet Swe			Vice Leader of National Executive Management Council	5 February 2021
71.	Maung Maung Ohn			Union Minister of Hotel and Tourism	7 February 2021
72.	Than Aung Kyaw			Deputy Minister of Investment and Foreign Economic Relations	7 February 2021
73.	Ye Tint			Deputy Minister of Information	7 February 2021
74.	Zaw Min Tun			Deputy Minister of Information	7 February 2021
75.	Lu Mon			Deputy Minister of Transport and Communication	7 February 2021
76.	Nyunt Aung			Deputy Minister of Economic and Trading Department	7 February 2021
77.	Myo Hlaing			Deputy Minister of Health and Sports	7 February 2021
78.	Khin Maung Kyi			Judge of Union Supreme Court	7 February 2021
79.	Tin Hong			Judge of Union Supreme Court	7 February 2021
80.	Khin May Yee			Judge of Union Supreme Court	7 February 2021
81.	Phyo Phyo			Chief Justice of High Court by Sagaing Region Hluttaw	7 February 2021
82.	Khin Thinn Wai			Chief Justice of High Court by Mandalay Region Hluttaw	7 February 2021
83.	Thinn Thinn Nwe			Chief Justice of High Court by Yangon Region Hluttaw	7 February 2021
84.	Man Hauk Nyan			Chief Justice of High Court by Chin State Hluttaw	7 February 2021
85.	Zaw Htoo			Chief Justice of High Court by Sagaing Region Hluttaw	7 February 2021
86.	Khin Thit Swe			Chief Justice of High Court by Mandalay Region Hluttaw	7 February 2021
87.	Nyo Tun			Chief Justice of High Court by Yangon Region Hluttaw	7 February 2021
88.	Maung Maung			Vice Mayor of Nay Pyi Taw City Development Committee	7 February 2021
89.	Kyaw Sann			Mayor of Mandalay City Development Committee	7 February 2021
90.	Aung Than Oo			Union Minister of Electricity and Energy	8 February 2021
91.	Than Kyaw			Chairman of Union Constitutional Tribunal	8 February 2021
92.	Nyan Tun			Member of Union Constitutional Tribunal	8 February 2021
93.	Khin Maung Oo			Member of Union Constitutional Tribunal	8 February 2021
94.	Saw San Lin			Member of Union Constitutional Tribunal	8 February 2021
95.	Myo Chit			Member of Union Constitutional Tribunal	8 February 2021
96.	Kyaw Sann			Member of Union Constitutional Tribunal	8 February 2021
97.	Kyaw Min			Member of Union Constitutional Tribunal	8 February 2021
98.	Dr. Marlar Aung			Member of Union Constitutional Tribunal	8 February 2021
99.	Nan Sandar Sann			Member of Union Constitutional Tribunal	8 February 2021
100.	Sitt Aye			Member of Union Civil Service Board	8 February 2021
101.	Tin Oo			Member of Union Civil Service Board	8 February 2021
102.	Sann Myint			Member of Union Civil Service Board	8 February 2021
103.	Khin Myo Myint			Member of Union Civil Service Board	8 February 2021
104.	Ye Naing			Member of Union Civil Service Board	8 February 2021
105.	Hla Soe			Chairman of Yangon State Administration Council	8 February 2021
106.	Ye Myint			Chairman of Ayeyarwady State Administration Council	8 February 2021
107.	Saw Ba Hlaing			Member of Union Electoral Commission	9 February 2021
108.	Soe Oo			Member of Union Electoral Commission	9 February 2021
109.	Dr. Khin Naing Oo			Member of Central Bank	10 February 2021
110.	Aung Kyaw Than			Member of Central Bank	10 February 2021
111.	Ye Toe Thwin			Managing Director of Electricity Supply Enterprise (Ministry of Electricity and Energy)	
112.	Hein Htet			Director General of Hydropower Implementation Department (Ministry of Electricity and Energy)	
113.	Win Zaw Aung			Director General of Population Department (Ministry of Labour, Immigration and Population)	
114.	Myo Swe			Member of Kachin State Administration Council	11 February 2021
115.	Taint Saung			Member of Kachin State Administration Council	11 February 2021
116.	Paul Lu Chan			Member of Kayah State Administration Council	11 February 2021
117.	Sue Myar Yin Yin Lay			Member of Kayah State Administration Council	11 February 2021
118.	Saw Khin Maung Myint			Member of Kayin State Administration Council	11 February 2021
119.	Zaw Win			Member of Kayin State Administration Council	11 February 2021
120.	Ngoon Soon Aung			Member of Chin State Administration Council	11 February 2021
121.	Go Swinn Khaing			Member of Chin State Administration Council	11 February 2021
122.	Hla Han			Member of Sagaing Region State Administration Council	11 February 2021
123.	Yee Yee Than			Member of Sagaing Region State Administration Council	11 February 2021
124.	Maung Kyi			Member of Tanintharyi Region State Administration Council	11 February 2021
125.	Khin Maung Myint			Member of Tanintharyi Region State Administration Council	11 February 2021
126.	Htay Lwin Oo			Member of Bago Region State Administration Council	11 February 2021
127.	Tin Oo			Member of Bago Region State Administration Council	11 February 2021
128.	Dr. Sann Hlaing			Member of Magway Region State Administration Council	11 February 2021
129.	Sai Myint Aye			Member of Magway Region State Administration Council	11 February 2021
130.	Myo Aung			Member of Mandalay Region State Administration Council	11 February 2021
131.	Thein Htay			Member of Mandalay Region State Administration Council	11 February 2021
132.	Zaw Lin Tun			Member of Mon State Administration Council	11 February 2021
133.	Aung Kyi Thein			Member of Mon State Administration Council	11 February 2021
134.	San Shwe Maung			Member of Rakhine State Administration Council	11 February 2021
135.	Than Htun			Member of Rakhine State Administration Council	11 February 2021
136.	Aung Than Oo			Member of Yangon Region State Administration Council	11 February 2021
137.	Zaw Win			Member of Yangon Region State Administration Council	11 February 2021
138.	Khun Thein Maung			Member of Shan State Administration Council	11 February 2021
139.	Sai Late			Member of Shan State Administration Council	11 February 2021
140.	Tin Aye			Member of Ayeyarwady Region State Administration Council	11 February 2021
141.	Ohn Myint			Member of Ayeyarwady Region State Administration Council	11 February 2021
142.	Myint Soe			Member of Nay Pyi Daw Council	11 February 2021
143.	Zeyar Lin			Member of Nay Pyi Daw Council	11 February 2021
144.	Bo Htay			Mayor and President of Yangon City Development Committee	11 February 2021
145.	Nyi Nyi			Vice Mayor and President of Yangon City Development Committee	11 February 2021
146.	Nyunt Phay			Secretary of Yangon City Development Committee	11 February 2021
147.	Saw Han			Vice Mayor and President of Mandalay City Development Committee	11 February 2021
148.	Win Maung			Secretary of Mandalay City Development Committee	11 February 2021
149.	Nyi Nyi Kyaw	Military	Air 2522, Lieutenant General	Member of 'Naga' Self-Administered Division and Zone	11 February 2021
150.	Tin Naing Oo	Military	Army 34100, Lieutenant General	Member of 'Danu' Self-Administered Division and Zone	11 February 2021
151.	Nyi Nyi Tin	Military	Army 30545, Lieutenant General	Member of 'Pa-O' Self-Administered Division and Zone	11 February 2021
152.	Moe Min Win	Military	Army 30132, Lieutenant General	Member of 'PaLaung' Self-Administered Division and Zone	11 February 2021
153.	Thaw Naung	Military	Army 32118, Lieutenant General	Member of 'KoKang' Self-Administered Division and Zone	11 February 2021
154.	Aung Kyaw Soe	Military	Army 34056, Lieutenant General	Member of 'Wa' Self-Administered Division and Zone	11 February 2021
155.	Kyaw Lin Aung	Military	Army 29197, Kachin State General	Member of State Administration Council	12 February 2021
156.	Myint Wai	Military	Army 22000, Kayah State General	Member of State Administration Council	12 February 2021
157.	Myo Min Naung	Military	Army 22617, Kayin State General	Member of State Administration Council	12 February 2021
158.	Han Win Aung	Military	Army 25995, Chin State General	Member of State Administration Council	12 February 2021
159.	Win Tin Soe	Military	Army 24993, Sagaing State General	Member of State Administration Council	12 February 2021
160.	Kyaw Zay Ya	Military	Army 26934, Tanintharyi State General	Member of State Administration Council	12 February 2021
161.	Hla Myo Shwe	Military	Army 27294, Bago State General	Member of State Administration Council	12 February 2021
162.	Min Oo	Military	Army 20825, Magway State General	Member of State Administration Council	12 February 2021
163.	Kyaw Kyaw Min	Military	Army 26109, Mandalay State General	Member of State Administration Council	12 February 2021
164.	Nay Htut Oo	Military	Army 26939, Mon State General	Member of State Administration Council	12 February 2021
165.	Min Than	Military	Army 23158, Rakhine State General	Member of State Administration Council	12 February 2021
166.	Win Tint	Military	Army 21897, Yangon State General	Member of State Administration Council	12 February 2021
167.	Hla Oo	Military	Army 26759, Shan State General	Member of State Administration Council	12 February 2021
168.	Kyaw Swar Hlaing	Military	Army 25130, Ayeyarwady State General	Member of State Administration Council	12 February 2021
169.	Min Naung	Military	Army 21111, Chief General	Minister of Nay Pyi Taw Council Security and Border Affairs Member of Nay Pyi Taw Council	12 February 2021
170.	Min Htain			Deputy Minister of Construction	12 February 2021
171.	Aung Chain			Member of Magway Region State Administration Council	15 February 2021
172.	Aung Myint Oo			Permanent Secretary/ Director General (Ministry of Construction & Road Management Department)	16 February 2021
173.	Htun Zaw			Director General of Central Statistical Organization (Ministry of Planning, Finance and Industry)	16 February 2021
174.	Dr. Thi Thi Myint			Director General of Legal Advisory Department (Union Attorney General's Office)	16 February 2021
175.	Kyaw Win Han			Rector of Central Institute of Civil Service (Lower Myanmar), Union Civil Service Board	16 February 2021
176.	Ngun Sann Aung		Former Rector of Pathein University	Chairman of Chin State Administration Council	16 February 2021
177.	Han Kyint Zam			Member of Chin State Administration Council	16 February 2021
178.	Win Shein			Deputy Minister of Labor, Immigration and Public Affairs	16 February 2021
179.	Htay Hlaing			Deputy Minister of Labor, Immigration and Public Affairs	16 February 2021
180.	Dr. Nyunt Phay			Union Minister of Education Department	16 February 2021
181.	Kyaw Win			Member of Central Bank	18 February 2021
182.	Dr. Lin Aung			Member of Central Bank	18 February 2021

== See also ==
- 2021 Myanmar coup d'état
