= Cabinet of Nyo Saw =

New government of Myanmar

- 5th Union Government of Myanmar
- 2025–2026
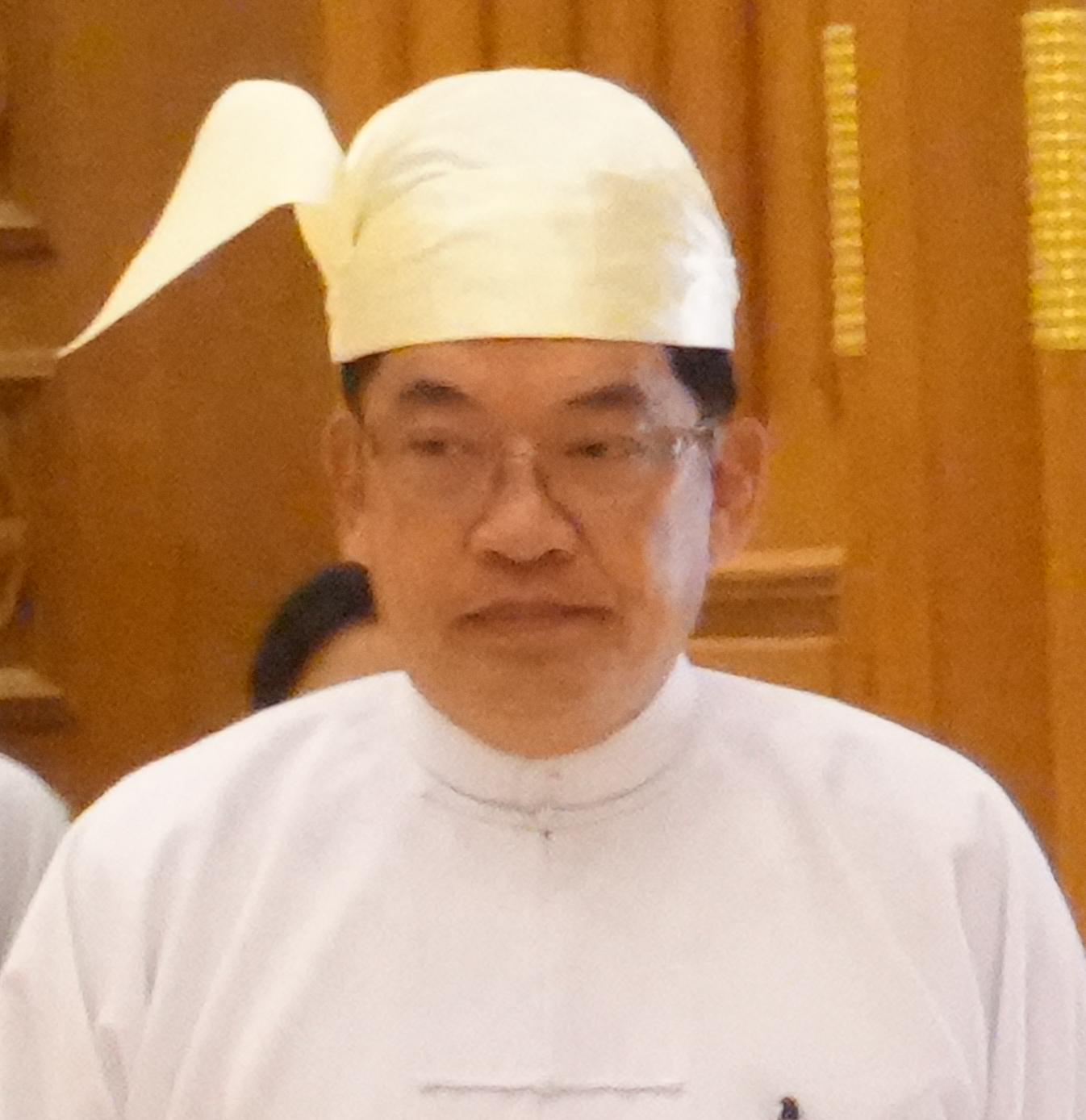
- Prime Minister Nyo Saw
- Date formed: 31 July 2025
- Date dissolved: 10 April 2026

People and organisations
- President: Myint Swe (acting) (Note: until 7 August 2025); Min Aung Hlaing (Note: Pro Tem (On Duty) since 22 July 2024)
- Prime Minister: Nyo Saw
- Chairman of the State Security and Peace Commission and Vice-Chairman of the State Security and Peace Commission: Min Aung Hlaing and Soe Win
- No. of ministers: 31
- Member party: Tatmadaw; Union Solidarity and Development Party
- Status in legislature: Legislature dissolved (Until 2026) Majority government (2026)

History
- Incoming formation: National Defence and Security Council Order no. 3/2025
- Predecessor: Military cabinet of Min Aung Hlaing
- Successor: Second Min Aung Hlaing cabinet

The cabinet of Nyo Saw (officially Union Government of the Republic of the Union of Myanmar), headed by Prime Minister Nyo Saw, was the former executive body of Myanmar and the fifth government of Myanmar under 2008 constitution and the second military government after the 2021 Myanmar coup d'état.

It took office on 31 July 2025, following the revocation of the state of emergency and transfer of state power to the Commander-in-Chief of the Defence Services as a result of the 2021 Myanmar coup d'état. The NDSC appointed Nyo Saw as Prime Minister to head the Union Government in the lead-up to the 2025 Myanmar general elections.

On the same day, the National Defence and Security Council formed the State Security and Peace Commission, to continue essential direction and coordinate the successful execution of 2025 general election, with Min Aung Hlaing as its Chairman and Nyo Saw as a sitting member.

The 31-member Union Government was appointed via Order 3/2025 and Order 5/2025 of the NDSC.

Since 2026, and the election of Min Aung Hlaing as President by the Assembly of the Union, the cabinet of Prime Minister Nyo Saw has been dissolved.

== Head and Deputy Heads ==
Office	Name	Term in office		
Office	Name	Took office	Left office	Days
Pro Tem President of Myanmar (On Duty)	Min Aung Hlaing	22 July 2024		
Chairman of the State Security and Peace Commission	Min Aung Hlaing	31 July 2025		
Prime Minister of Myanmar	Nyo Saw	31 July 2025		
Union Minister at the Prime Minister's Office	Nyo Saw	31 July 2025		
Union Minister for National Planning and Economic Development	Nyo Saw	31 July 2025		

== Cabinet Members ==
	Portfolio	Minister	Took office	Left office
1	Prime Minister and Union Minister Prime Minister's Office and Ministry of National Planning and Economic Development	Nyo Saw	31 July 2025	
2	Union Minister Ministry 1 of the President's Office	Tin Aung San		
3	Union Minister Ministry 2 of the President's Office	Ko Ko Hlaing		
4	Union Minister Ministry 3 of the President's Office	Maung Maung Tint		
5	Union Minister Ministry 4 of the President's Office	Tun Ohn		
6	Union Minister Ministry of Transport and Communications	Mya Tun Oo		
7	Union Minister Ministry of Defence	Maung Maung Aye		
8	Union Minister Ministry of Home Affairs	Tun Tun Naung	31 July 2025	27 January 2026
8	Union Minister Ministry of Home Affairs	Phone Myat	27 January 2026	
9	Union Minister Ministry of Foreign Affairs	Than Swe		
10	Union Minister Ministry of Finance and Revenue	Dr Kan Zaw		
11	Union Minister Ministry for Border Affairs and Ministry of Ethnic Affairs	Yar Pyae		
12	Union Minister Ministry of Investment and Foreign Economic Relations	Dr Wah Wah Maung		
13	Union Minister and Attorney-General Office of the Attorney-General of the Union and Ministry of Legal Affairs	Thida Oo		
14	Union Minister Ministry of Information	Maung Maung Ohn		
15	Union Minister Ministry of Religious Affairs and Culture	Tin Oo Lwin		
16	Union Minister Ministry of Agriculture, Livestock and Irrigation	Min Naung		
17	Union Minister Ministry of Cooperatives and Rural Development	Hla Moe		
18	Union Minister Ministry of Natural Resources and Environmental Conservation	Khin Maung Yi		
19	Union Minister Ministry of Electric Power	Nyan Tun		
20	Union Minister Ministry of Energy	Ko Ko Lwin		
21	Union Minister Ministry of Industry	Dr Charlie Than		
22	Union Minister Ministry of Immigration and Population	Myint Kyaing		
23	Union Minister Ministry of Labour	Aung Kyaw Hoe		
24	Union Minister Ministry of Commerce	Chit Swe		
25	Union Minister Ministry of Science and Technology	Dr Myo Thein Kyaw		
26	Union Minister Ministry of Health	Dr Thet Khaing Win		
27	Union Minister Ministry of Sports and Youth Affairs	Jeng Phang Naw Taung		
28	Union Minister Ministry of Hotels and Tourism			
29	Union Minister Ministry of Construction	Myo Thant		
30	Union Minister Ministry of Social Welfare, Relief and Resettlement	Dr Soe Win		
31	Union Minister Ministry of Education	Dr Chaw Chaw Sein		
32	Director-General Director-General of the Union Government's Office	Nay Lin		
