= Politics of Myanmar =

Myanmar (formerly Burma) (Burmese: မြန်မာ) operates de jure as a unitary assembly-independent republic under its 2008 constitution. On 1 February 2021, Myanmar's military overthrew the country's democratically elected government in a coup, causing ongoing anti-coup protests.

As of June 2026, Myanmar is under the governance of the Union Government, following the nomination of Min Aung Hlaing in the 2026 presidential election.

== Political conditions ==
=== Early history ===
The first known city-states emerged in central Myanmar in the second century AD. They were founded by Tibeto-Burman-speaking migrants from present-day Yunnan. The history of Myanmar as a unified entity, formerly called Burma, began with the Pagan Kingdom in 849. In 1057, King Anawrahta founded the first unified Myanmar state at Bagan. In 1287, the Bagan kingdom collapsed following recurring Mongol invasions, leading to 250 years of political divide. In the time period between 1510 and 1752, the area was united as Burma by the Toungoo dynasty, which was the largest Southeast Asian empire in the 16th century. From 1752 to 1885, the Toungoo administrative reforms were continued by the Konbaung dynasty. The thousand-year line of Burmese monarchy ended with the Third Anglo-Burmese War in 1885.

=== British rule ===
After 1885, the country was administered as part of British India until 1937. British Burma began with its official recognition on the colonial map that marks its new borders containing over 100 ethnicities. It was named Burma after the dominant ethnic group Bamar, who make up 68 percent of the population.

==== World War II ====
During World War II, a coalition of mostly members of the Bamar ethnic group volunteered to fight alongside the Japanese in hope of overthrowing the occupying British forces. Meanwhile, many other ethnic groups supported the Allied forces against the Bamar-backed Japanese forces. This conflict would come to be very significant in the aftermath of World War II when Burma was granted its independence from Great Britain in 1948. Prior to the end of their colonization, the British government had created a novel map of the country with new borders that included some previously sovereign ethnicities. Many groups of racially and culturally diverse people suddenly found themselves as part of a country that was named after the Bamar, a group they did not identify with. The division created during World War II only exacerbated the growing resentment towards the Bamar. By granting independence to Burma, the British government handed the control of all the containing ethnicities over to the Bamar.

=== Panglong Agreement ===
Aung San, who led the fight for independence, was able to convince the leaders of the other ethnic groups that fought alongside the Burmese to remain as one country. The formation of the new Burmese constitution in 1948 was cemented by the Pin-Lone agreement, which was signed by every ethnic leader in support of the newfound union. Aung San's unprecedented assassination prior to the absolute fulfillment of the Pin-Lone agreement undid the unification he led. His death marked the end of the short lived period of peace within the new nation, unleashing a power vacuum that has not been filled properly since. A period of instability with leaders that failed to represent every ethnicity's best interest followed.

Beginning in the late 1950s, and continuing through at least 2024, Myanmar's military has played a major role in shaping or directing the country's politics.

=== Socialist republic ===
Democracy was suspended in the country following a coup in 1962. The uncertainty and chaos paved the way for a Burmese nationalist government to take over. From 1962 to 1988, the country was ruled by the Burma Socialist Programme Party as a one-party state guided by the Burmese Way to Socialism. The new Burmese leaders turned Burma into a Socialist Republic with isolationism, and a Burmese superiority. The newfound Burmese nationalism put the Bamar majority at the forefront, undoing the unification initiated through the Pin-Lone agreement. Additionally, the growing disdain was enhanced through the forced coexistence between members of different religions. Bamar kingdoms were almost exclusively Buddhist in the past. Most ethnic groups within the Shan, Kayin, Kayar, and Chin state practiced their own versions of Animism, while people of the Islamic faith lived alongside the Buddhists in the Arakan (now Rakhine) state. The annexation of all the diverse groups into the British India deepened the religious polarization. The movement of people across the border caused by the colonization added a large group of Hindu followers to the mix. The strenuous conversion campaigns by the Catholic Christians and their competition with the Methodist colonialists additionally divided minority groups such as the Karen and Kachin within themselves. The colonial departure unleashed the animosity that has been building towards one other. The death of Aung San, and the following leaderships ensured the lasting conflicts between every cultural and religious group. The 1988 Uprising cemented the social, political, and civil unrests that have plagued the country since.

=== 1988 Uprising ===
The SPDC junta which took power in 1988 had been responsible for the displacement of several hundred thousand citizens, both inside and outside of Burma. The Karen, Karenni, and Mon ethnic groups have sought asylum in neighbouring Thailand, where they are also abused by an unfriendly and unsympathetic government. These groups are perhaps more fortunate than the Wa and Shan ethnic groups, who have become internally displaced peoples in their own state since being removed from lands by the military junta in 2000. There are reportedly 600,000 of these internally displaced peoples living in Burma today. Many are trying to escape forced labour in the military or for one of the many state-sponsored drug cartels. This displacement of peoples led, and continues to lead to human rights violations as well as the exploitation of minority ethnic groups at the hands of the dominant Bamar group. The primary actors in these ethnic struggles include, but are not limited to, the military, the Karen National Union, Kachin Independence army, United League of Arakan, Restoration Council of Shan State, and the Mong Tai Army.

The military gave up some of its power in 2011, leading to the creation of a semi-democratic system, although problems remained, including outsized influence by the military under the 2008 constitution, as well as economic and ethnic issues. In 2015 the military began taking steps to make peace with various ethnic armed groups calling a Nationwide Ceasefire Agreement which was signed by many such groups.

=== 2021 Myanmar coup d'état ===
On 31 January 2021, it was reported by multiple media and news outlets that the military had staged a coup and members of the governing party, National League for Democracy, had been arrested and detained by the military. Bo Nagar, commander of the Burma National Revolutionary Army (BNRA), which is fighting against the military in Myanmar's central regions, told CNN in November 2023, "It's the beginning of the end of State Administration Council, we are already seeing it." These conflicts arose after the NLD had claimed victory after a successful election in November 2020. While the military contested the results of the election claiming fraudulent without any proof or investigation. This situation was followed by the military performing coup d'état on 1 February 2021, taking the presidential powers from the NLD government by brute force. Shortly after taking control of the government, the military began breaking the Nationwide Ceasefire Agreement by taking aggressive actions in territories controlled by its signers.

A International Republican Institute 2024 survey found the main issues in Myanmar were inflation, political instability and unemployment.

== History ==
=== Independence era ===
On 4 January 1948, Burma achieved independence from Britain, and became a democracy based on the parliamentary system.

In late 1946 Aung San became Deputy Chairman of the Executive Council of Burma, a transitional government. But on 19 July 1947, political rivals assassinated Aung San (the current Prime Minister then) and several cabinet members, one of which was his brother. On 4 January 1948, the nation became an independent republic, named the Union of Burma, with Sao Shwe Thaik as its first president and U Nu as its first prime minister. Unlike almost all other former British colonies, it did not become a member of the Commonwealth. A bicameral parliament was formed, consisting of a Chamber of Deputies and a Chamber of Nationalities. The geographical area Burma encompasses today can be traced to the Panglong Agreement, which combined Burma proper, which consisted of Lower Burma and Upper Burma, and the Frontier Areas, which had been administered separately by the British.

=== AFPFL/Union government ===
In 1961, U Thant, Burma's Permanent Representative to the United Nations and former secretary to the Prime Minister, was elected Secretary-General of the United Nations; he was the first non-Westerner to head any international organization and would serve as UN Secretary-General for ten years. Among the Burmese to work at the UN when he was Secretary-General was a young woman named Aung San Suu Kyi.

=== Military socialist era ===
In 1962, General Ne Win led a coup d'état and established a socialist military government that sought to create a "Burmese Way to Socialism". The military expropriated private businesses and followed an economic policy of autarky, or economic isolation. The Burmese Way to Socialism emphasized that the military was to have a central role in governing the country, and that the Burmese language and Buddhism were central to identity.

There were sporadic protests against military rule during the Ne Win years and these were almost always violently suppressed. On 7 July 1962, the government broke up demonstrations at Rangoon University, killing 15 students. In 1974, the military violently suppressed anti-government protests at the funeral of U Thant. Student protests in 1975, 1976 and 1977 were quickly suppressed by overwhelming force. The military government of General Ne Win was deposed following the massive 8888 Uprising in 1988 when thousands died, but immediately replaced by another military junta.

=== SPDC era ===
The former head of state was Senior General Than Shwe who held the title of "Chairman of the State Peace and Development Council". His appointed prime minister was Khin Nyunt until 19 October 2004, when he was forcibly deposed in favour of Gen. Soe Win. Almost all cabinet offices are held by military officers.

US and European government sanctions against the military government, combined with consumer boycotts and shareholder pressure organised by Free Burma activists, have succeeded in forcing most western corporations to withdraw from Burma. However, some western oil companies remain due to loopholes in the sanctions. For example, the French oil company TotalEnergies and the American oil company Chevron continue to operate the Yadana natural gas pipeline from Burma to Thailand. TotalEnergies (formerly TotalFinaElf) is the subject of a lawsuit in French and Belgian courts for alleged complicity in human rights abuses along the gas pipeline. Before it was acquired by Chevron, Unocal settled a similar lawsuit for a reported multimillion-dollar amount. Asian businesses, such as Daewoo, continue to invest in Burma, particularly in natural resource extraction.

The United States and European clothing and shoe industry became the target of Free Burma activists for buying from factories in Burma that were wholly or partly owned by the government or the military. Many stopped sourcing from Burma after protests, starting with Levi Strauss in 1992. From 1992 to 2003, Free Burma advocates successfully forced dozens of clothing and shoe companies to stop sourcing from Burma. These companies included Eddie Bauer, Liz Claiborne, Macy's, J. Crew, JoS. A. Banks, Children's Place, Burlington Coat Factory, Wal-Mart, and Target. The US government banned all imports from Burma as part of the "Burmese Freedom and Democracy Act" of 2003. Sanctions have been criticised for their adverse effects on the civilian population. However, Burmese democracy movement leader Aung San Suu Kyi has repeatedly credited sanctions for putting pressure on the ruling military regime.

Human Rights Watch and Amnesty International have documented egregious human rights abuses by the military government. Civil liberties were severely restricted. Human Rights Defenders and Promoters, formed in 2002 to raise awareness among the people of Burma about their human rights, claims that on 18 April 2007, several of its members were met by approximately a hundred people led by a local USDA Secretary U Nyunt Oo and beaten up. The HRDP believes that this attack was condoned by the authorities.

There is no independent judiciary in Burma and the military government suppresses political activity. The government uses software-based filtering from US company Fortinet to limit the materials citizens can access on-line, including free email services, free web hosting and most political opposition and pro-democracy pages.

In 2001, the government permitted NLD office branches to re-open throughout Burma. However, they were shut down or heavily restricted beginning 2004, as part of a government campaign to prohibit such activities. In 2006, many members resigned from NLD, citing harassment and pressure from the Tatmadaw (Armed Forces) and the Union Solidarity and Development Association.

The military government placed Aung San Suu Kyi under house arrest again on 31 May 2003, following an attack on her convoy in northern Burma by a mob reported to be in league with the military. The regime extended her house arrest for yet another year in late November 2005. Despite a direct appeal by Kofi Annan to Than Shwe and pressure from ASEAN, the Burmese government extended Aung San Suu Kyi's house arrest another year on 27 May 2006. She was released in 2010.

The United Nations urged the country to move towards inclusive national reconciliation, the restoration of democracy, and full respect for human rights. In December 2008, the United Nations General Assembly passed a resolution condemning the human rights situation in Burma and calling for Aung San Suu Kyi's release—80 countries voting for the resolution, 25 against and 45 abstentions. Other nations, such as China and Russia, have been less critical of the regime and prefer to co-operate on economic matters.

Facing increasing international isolation, Burma's military government agreed to embark upon a programme of reform, including permitting multiple political parties to contest elections in 2010 and 2012 and the release of political prisoners. However, organizations such as Human Rights Watch allege continued human rights abuses in ongoing conflicts in border regions such as Kachin State and Rakhine State.

=== New constitution ===
Myanmar's army-drafted constitution was overwhelmingly approved (by 92.4% of the 22 million voters with alleged voter turnout of 99%) on 10 May 2008 in the first phase of a two-stage referendum and Cyclone Nargis. It was the first national vote since the 1990 election. Multi-party elections in 2010 would end 5 decades of military rule, as the new charter gives the military an automatic 25% of seats in parliament. NLD spokesman Nyan Win, inter alia, criticised the referendum: "This referendum was full of cheating and fraud across the country. In some villages, authorities and polling station officials ticked the ballots themselves and did not let the voters do anything".

=== 2010 election ===
An election was held in 2010, with 40 parties approved to contest the elections by the Electoral Commission. some of which are linked to ethnic minorities. The National League for Democracy, which overwhelmingly won the previous 1990 elections but were never allowed to take power, decided not to participate.

The military-backed Union Solidarity and Development Party declared victory, winning 259 of the 330 contested seats. The United Nations and many Western countries have condemned the elections as fraudulent, although the decision to hold elections was praised by China and Russia.

=== 2012 by-elections ===
In by-elections held in 2012, the main opposition party National League for Democracy, which was only re-registered for the by-elections on 13 December 2011 won in 43 of the 44 seats they contested (out of 46). Significantly, international observers were invited to monitor the elections, although the government was criticised for placing too many restrictions on election monitors, some of whom were denied visas.

The Union Solidarity and Development Party said it would lodge official complaints to the Union Election Commission on poll irregularities, voter intimidation, and purported campaign incidents that involved National League for Democracy members and supporters, while the National League for Democracy also sent an official complaint to the commission, regarding ballots that had been tampered with.

However, President Thein Sein remarked that the by-elections were conducted "in a very successful manner", and many foreign countries have indicated willingness to lift or loosen sanctions on Burma and its military leaders.

=== 2015 election ===
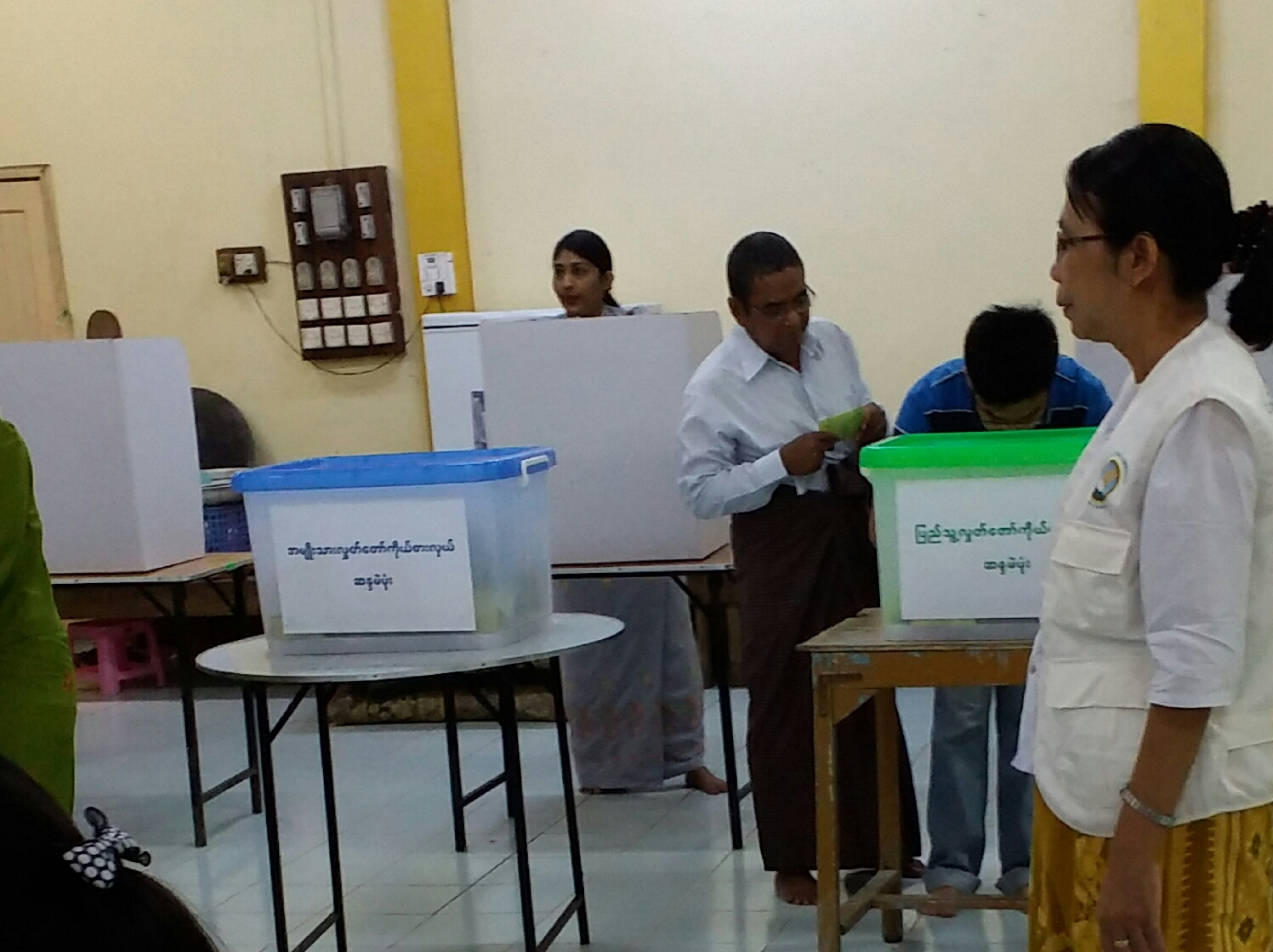
Voting at a polling station

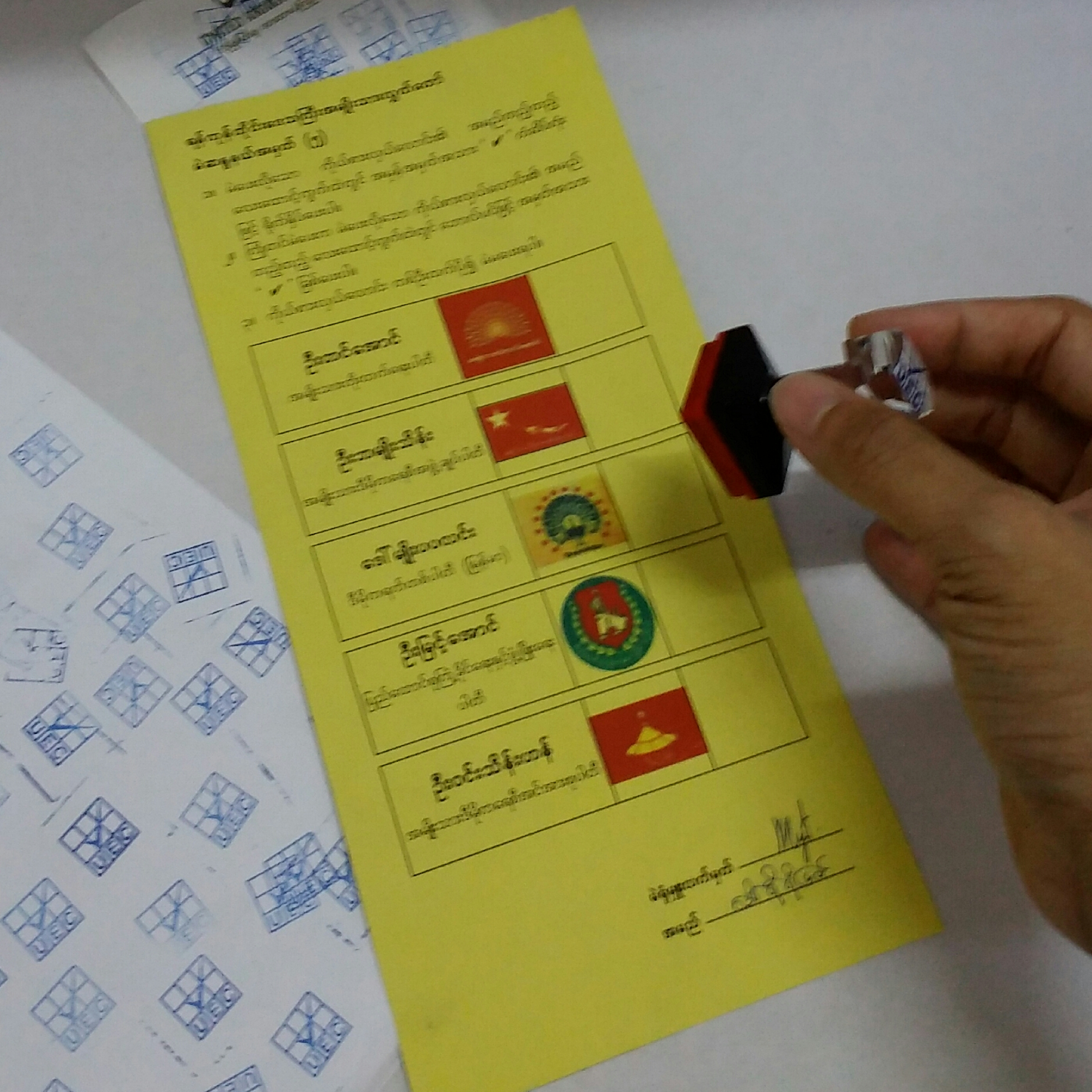
Ballot papers and stamps

Myanmar general elections were held on 8 November 2015. These were the first openly contested elections held in Myanmar since 1990. The results gave the National League for Democracy an absolute majority of seats in both chambers of the national parliament, enough to ensure that its candidate would become president, while NLD leader Aung San Suu Kyi is constitutionally barred from the presidency.

The resounding victory of Aung San Suu Kyi's National League for Democracy in 2015 general elections raised hopes for a successful political transition from a closely held military rule to a free democratic system. This transition was widely believed to be determining the future of Myanmar.

According to the results announced by the Union Election Commission on 13 November 2015, the NLD won 238 seats in the lower house and 348 seats in the Pyidaungsu Hluttaw, exceeding the required number to form a government and elect a president.

=== 2021 military coup and subsequent junta ===
The Tatmadaw, under the leadership of Min Aung Hlaing, seized power from the civilian government after detaining Aung San Suu Kyi and other democratically elected leaders in Naypyidaw. A military junta, officially the State Administration Council was subsequently established. The State Administration Council would later reestablish the position of Prime Minister. Nyo Saw would be appointed to this position.

The State Administration Council or SAC was dissolved in 2025, while the State Security and Peace Commission or SSPC was formed. In 2026, SSPC was also dissolved.

==== Heads and deputy heads ====
Office	Name	Term of service		
Office	Name	Took office	Left office	Days
Acting President	Myint Swe	1 February 2021	22 July 2024	1267
Acting President	Min Aung Hlaing	22 July 2024	Incumbent	837
First Vice President	Myint Swe	30 March 2016	7 August 2025	3417
Second Vice President	Henry Van Thio	30 March 2016	22 April 2024	2945
Chairman of the State Administration Council	Min Aung Hlaing	2 February 2021	Incumbent	2103
Prime Minister	Min Aung Hlaing	1 August 2021	31 July 2025	1460
Prime Minister	Nyo Saw	31 July 2025	Incumbent	463
Vice Chairman of the State Administration Council	Soe Win	2 February 2021	Incumbent	2103
Deputy Prime Minister	Soe Win	1 August 2021	Incumbent	1923
Deputy Prime Minister	Mya Tun Oo	1 February 2023	Incumbent	1374
Deputy Prime Minister	Tin Aung San	1 February 2023	Incumbent	1374
Deputy Prime Minister	Soe Htut	1 February 2023	Incumbent	1374
Deputy Prime Minister	Win Shein	1 February 2023	Incumbent	1374

==== Cabinet members ====
Portfolio	Minister	Took office	Left office	Party
Union Minister for Defence	General Mya Tun Oo	1 February 2021	3 August 2023	Tatmadaw
Union Minister for Defence	Admiral Tin Aung San	3 August 2023	Incumbent	Tatmadaw
Union Minister for Home Affairs	Lieutenant General Soe Htut	1 February 2021	3 August 2023	Tatmadaw
Union Minister for Home Affairs	Lieutenant General Yar Pyae	3 August 2023	Incumbent	Tatmadaw
Union Minister for Foreign Affairs	Wunna Maung Lwin	1 February 2021	1 February 2023	USDP
Union Minister for Foreign Affairs	Than Swe	1 February 2023	Incumbent	
Union Minister at the State Administration Council Chairman's Office Ministry (1)	Ko Ko Hlaing	8 January 2024	5 May 2024	Independent
Union Minister at the State Administration Council Chairman's Office Ministry (1)	Admiral Moe Aung	5 May 2024	Incumbent	Tatmadaw
Union Minister at the State Administration Council Chairman's Office Ministry (2)	Aung Naing Oo	8 January 2024	5 May 2024	Independent
Union Minister at the State Administration Council Chairman's Office Ministry (2)	Ko Ko Hlaing	5 May 2024	Incumbent	Independent
Union Minister at the State Administration Council Chairman's Office Ministry (3)	Aung Kyaw Hoe	22 January 2024	Incumbent	Independent
Union Minister at the State Administration Council Chairman's Office Ministry (4)	Admiral Moe Aung	8 January 2024	5 May 2024	Tatmadaw
Union Minister at the State Administration Council Chairman's Office Ministry (4)	Aung Naing Oo	5 May 2024	27 May 2024	Independent
Minister of Border Affairs	Lieutenant General Tun Tun Naung	1 February 2021	Incumbent	Tatmadaw
Minister of Planning and Finance	Win Shein	1 February 2021	Incumbent	Independent
Minister of Investment and Foreign Economic Relations	Aung Naing Oo	1 February 2021	19 August 2022	Independent
Minister of Investment and Foreign Economic Relations	Dr Kan Zaw	19 August 2022	Incumbent	Independent
Minister of International Cooperation	Ko Ko Hlaing	1 February 2021	Incumbent	Independent
Attorney General and Minister of Legal Affairs	Thida Oo	2 February 2021 and 30 August 2021	Incumbent	Independent
Minister of Information	Chit Naing	1 February 2021	1 August 2021	Independent
Minister of Information	Maung Maung Ohn	1 August 2021	Incumbent	Independent
Minister of Religious Affairs and Culture	Ko Ko	1 February 2021	Incumbent	Independent
Minister of Agriculture, Livestock and Irrigation	Tin Htut Oo	3 February 2021	1 February 2023	Independent
Minister of Agriculture, Livestock and Irrigation	Min Naung	1 February 2023	Incumbent	
Minister of Cooperative and Rural Development	Hla Moe	24 June 2021	Incumbent	Independent
Minister of Transport and Communications	Admiral Tin Aung San	3 February 2021	3 August 2023	Tatmadaw
Minister of Transport and Communications	General Mya Tun Oo	3 August 2023	Incumbent	Tatmadaw
Minister of Natural Resources and Environmental Conservation	Khin Maung Yee	2 February 2021	Incumbent	Independent
Minister of Electric Power	Thaung Han	2 May 2022	Incumbent	Independent
Minister of Energy	Thaung Han	2 May 2022	5 August 2022	Independent
Minister of Energy	Myo Myint Oo	5 August 2022	Incumbent	Independent
Minister of Industry	Charlie Than	22 May 2021	Incumbent	Independent
Minister of Immigration and Population (former MOLIP)	Khin Yi	1 August 2021	19 August 2022	USDP
Minister of Immigration and Population (former MOLIP)	Myint Kyaing	19 August 2022	Incumbent	Independent
Minister of Labour (former MOLIP)	Myint Kyaing	1 February 2021	19 August 2022	Independent
Minister of Labour (former MOLIP)	Dr Pwint San	19 August 2022	Incumbent	Independent
Minister of Commerce	Pwint San	3 February 2021	19 August 2022	Independent
Minister of Commerce	Aung Naing Oo	19 August 2022	24 September 2023	Independent
Minister of Commerce	Tun Ohn	25 September 2023	Incumbent	Independent
Minister of Education	Nyunt Pe	16 February 2021	Incumbent	Independent
Minister of Science and Technology	Myo Thein Kyaw	17 June 2021	Incumbent	Independent
Minister of Health (former Health and Sports)	Thet Khaing Win	1 February 2021	Incumbent	Independent
Minister of Sports and Youth Affairs	Min Thein Zan	1 August 2021	Incumbent	Independent
Minister of Construction	Shwe Lay	2 February 2021	1 February 2023	Independent
Minister of Construction	Myo Thant	1 February 2023	Incumbent	
Minister of Social Welfare, Relief and Resettlement	Thet Thet Khine	4 February 2021	2 August 2023	PPP
Minister of Social Welfare, Relief and Resettlement	Dr Soe Win	3 August 2023	Incumbent	Independent
Minister of Hotels and Tourism	Maung Maung Ohn	7 February 2021	5 August 2021	Independent
Minister of Hotels and Tourism	Htay Aung	5 August 2021	1 February 2023	Independent
Minister of Hotels and Tourism	Aung Thaw	1 February 2023	2 August 2023	Independent
Minister of Hotels and Tourism	Thet Thet Khine	3 August 2023	Incumbent	PPP
Minister of Ethnic Affairs	Saw Tun Aung Myint	3 February 2021	1 February 2023	Independent
Minister of Ethnic Affairs	Jeng Phang Naw Taung	1 February 2023	Incumbent	
Minister of Electricity and Energy (dissolved)	Aung Than Oo	8 February 2021	2 May 2022	Independent

== Executive branch ==
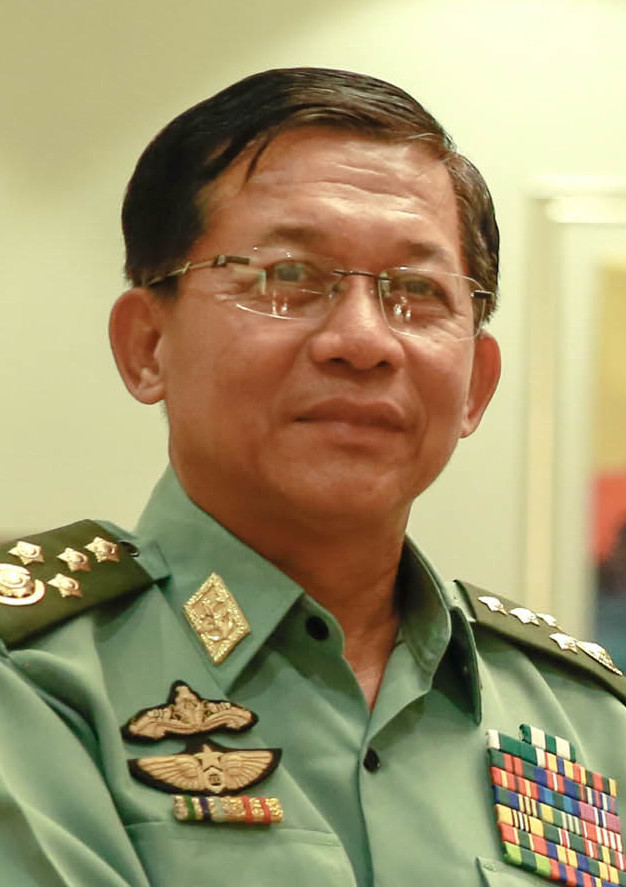
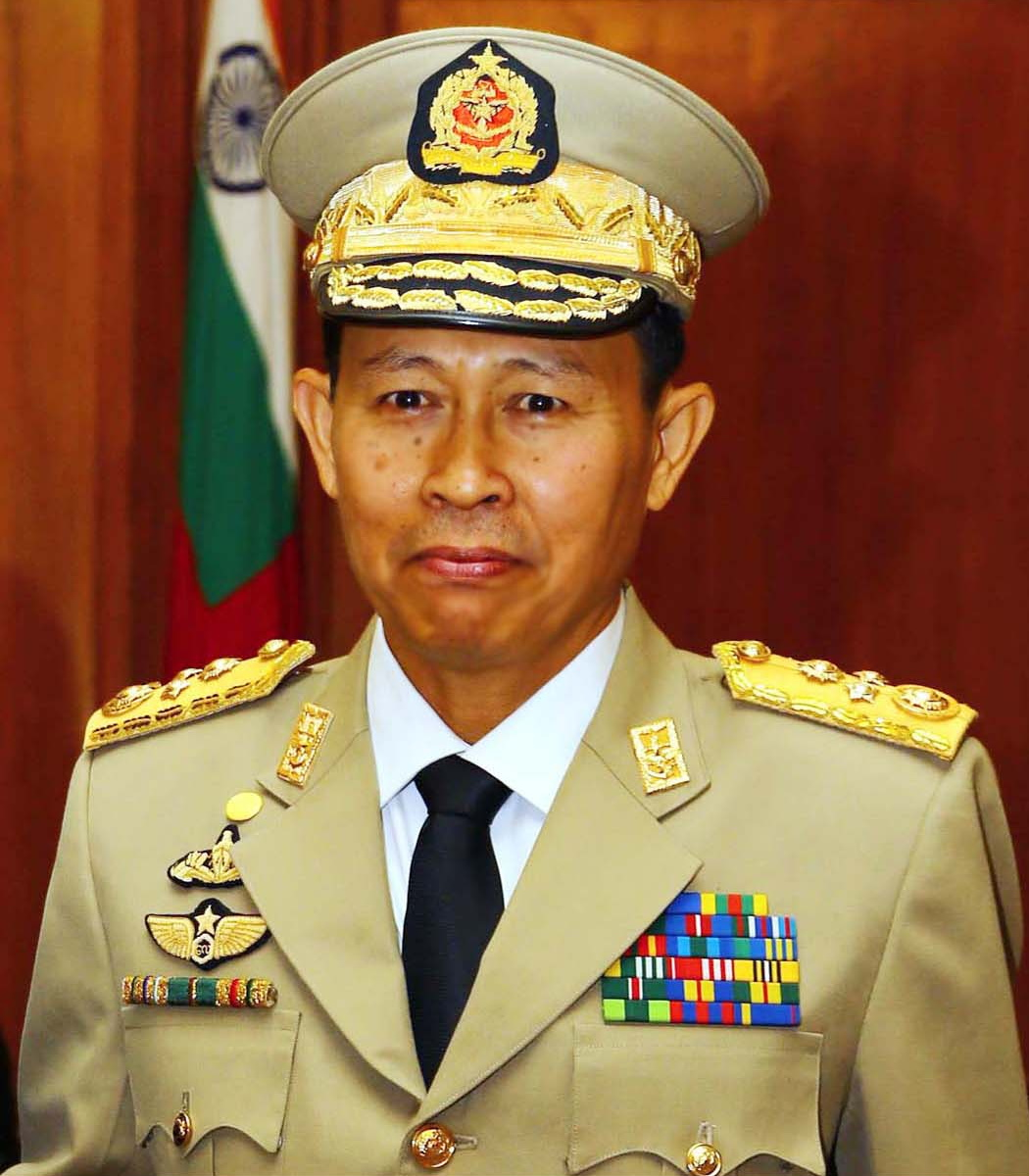
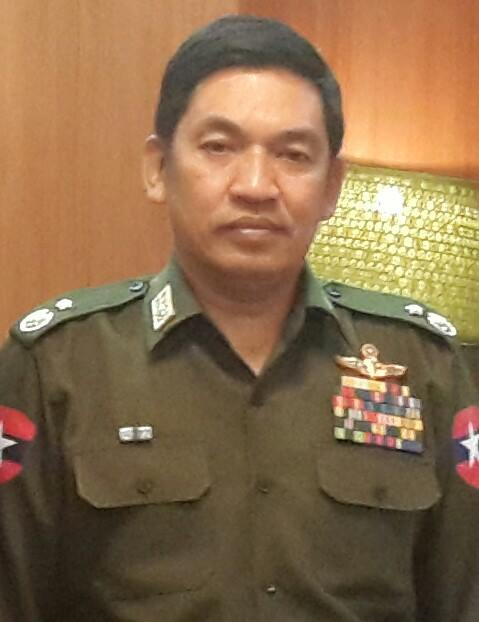
Head of State and Government, Deputy Head of Government, and Deputy Head of State
- Min Aung Hlaing, Chairman of the State Administration Council, President
- Soe Win, Vice Chairman of the State Administration Council
- Nyo Saw, Prime Minister of Myanmar

Main office-holders
Office	Name	Party	Since
Chairman; Acting President	Min Aung Hlaing	Tatmadaw	2 February 2021
Vice Chairman	Soe Win	Tatmadaw	2 February 2021
Prime Minister	Nyo Saw	Tatmadaw	31 July 2025

The president is the head of state and de jure head of government, and oversees the Cabinet of Myanmar. From 2021 to 2025, the Chairman of the State Administration Council was the de facto head of government.

The Commander-in-Chief of Defence Services (Tatmadaw) has the right to appoint 25% of the members in all legislative assembly which means that legislations cannot obtain super-majority without support from Tatmadaw, thus preventing democratically elected members from amending the 2008 Constitution of Myanmar. He can also directly appoint ministers in Ministry of Defence which in turn controls Myanmar Armed Forces, Ministry of Border Affairs which controls border affairs of the country, Ministry of Home Affairs which controls law enforcement via the Myanmar Police Force (MPF) and the administration of the country via the General Administration Department (GAD), and the Myanmar Economic Corporation which is the largest economic corporation in Myanmar.

== Legislative branch ==
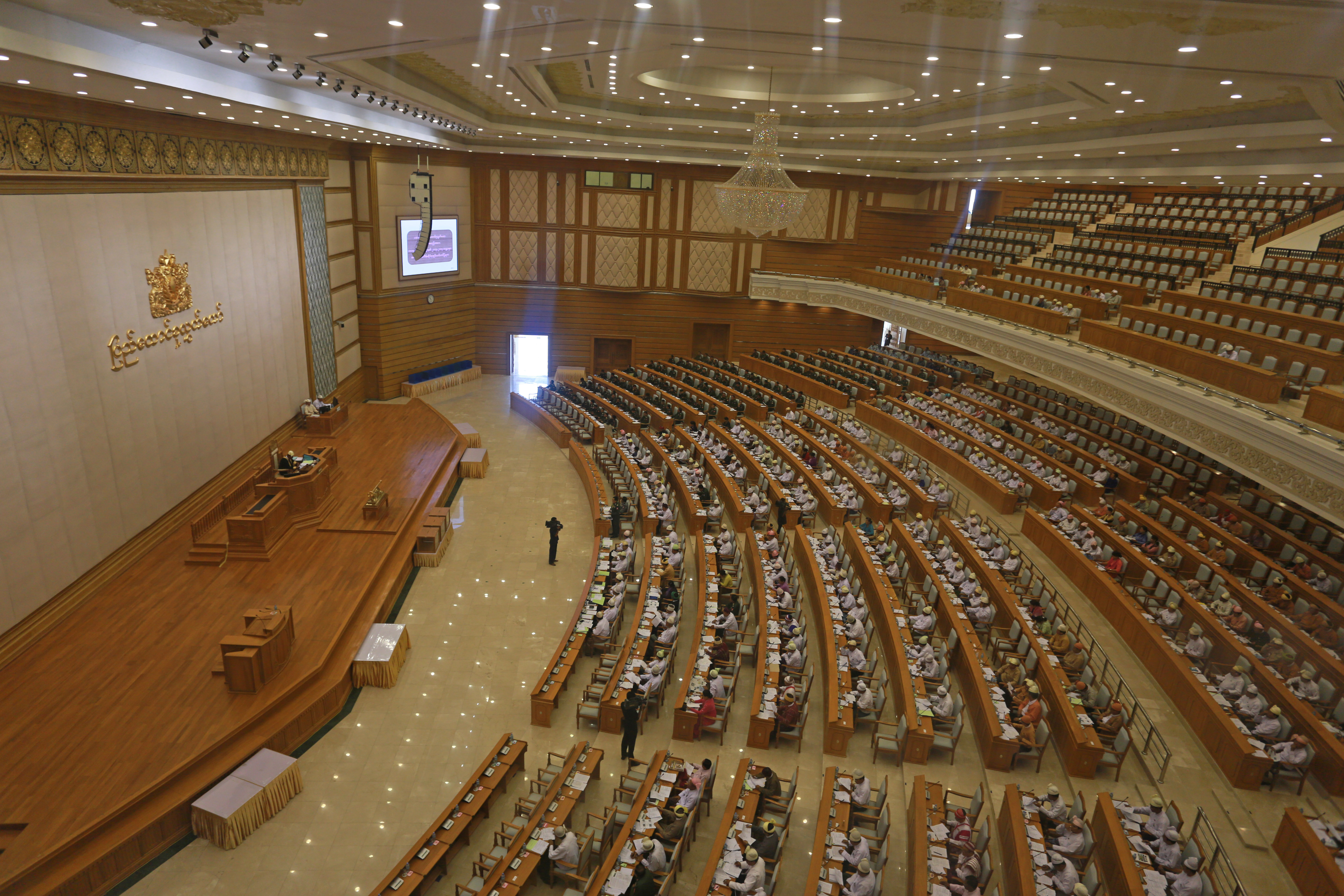
The Assembly of the Union.

Under the 2008 Constitution the legislative power of the Union is shared among the Pyidaungsu Hluttaw, State and Region Hluttaws. The Assembly of the Union (Pyidaungsu Hluttaw) consists of the House of Representatives (Pyithu Hluttaw) elected on the basis of township as well as population, and the House of Nationalities (Amyotha Hluttaw) with on an equal number of representatives elected from Regions and States. The House of Representatives consists of 440 representatives, with 110 being military personnel nominated by the Commander-in-Chief of the Defence Services. The House of Nationalities consists of 224 representatives with 56 being military personnel nominated by the Commander-in-Chief of the Defence Services.

== Judicial system ==
Burma's judicial system is limited. British-era laws and legal systems remain much intact, but there is no guarantee of a fair public trial. The judiciary is not independent of the executive branch. Burma does not accept compulsory International Court of Justice jurisdiction. The highest court in the land is the Supreme Court. The Chief Justice of the Supreme Court is Htun Htun Oo, and the Attorney General is also named Thida Oo. The judicial body in Myanmar that is responsible for constitutional interpretation and any other constitutional affairs is the Constitutional Tribunal.

=== Wareru dhammathat ===
Wareru dhammathat or the Manu dhammathat (မနုဓမ္မသတ်) was the earliest law-book in Burma. It consists of laws ascribed to the ancient Indian sage, Manu, and brought to Burma by Hindu colonists. The collection was made at Wareru's command, by monks from the writings of earlier Mon scholars preserved in the monasteries of his kingdom. (Wareru seized Martaban in 1281 and obtained the recognition of China as the ruler of Lower Burma and founded a kingdom which lasted until 1539. Martaban was its first capital, and remained so until 1369. It stretched southwards as far as Tenasserim.)

=== Dhammazedi pyatton ===
Mon King Dhammazedi (1472–92) was the greatest of the Mon rulers of Wareru's line. He was famous for his wisdom and the collection of his rulings were recorded in the Kalyani stone inscriptions and known as the Dammazedi pyatton.

== Administrative divisions ==
Burma is divided into seven regions (previously called divisions-taing) and seven states (pyi-nè), classified by ethnic composition. The seven regions are Ayeyarwady Region, Bago Region, Magway Region, Mandalay Region, Sagaing Region, Tanintharyi Region and Yangon Region; the seven states are Chin State, Kachin State, Kayin State, Kayah State, Mon State, Rakhine State and Shan State. There are also five Self-administrated zones and a Self-administrated Division "for National races with suitable population" The 5 self-administered zones are Danu Self-Administered Zone, Kokang Self-Administered Zone, Naga Self-Administered Zone, Pa Laung Self-Administered Zone, and the Pa'O Self-Administered Zone. The self-administered division is known as the Wa Self-Administered Division.

Within the Sagaing Region

- Naga Self-Administered Zone (Leshi, Lahe and Namyun townships)

Within the Shan State

- Palaung Self-Administered Zone (Namshan and Manton townships)
- Kokang Self-Administered Zone (Konkyan and Laukkai townships)
- Pa'O Self-Administered Zone (Hopong, Hshihseng and Pinlaung townships),
- Danu Self-Administered Zone (Ywangan and Pindaya townships),
- Wa Self-Administrated Division (Hopang, Mongmao, Panwai, Pangsang, Naphan and Metman townships)

== International organisation participation (in terms of food, water, medicine, shelter, etc.) ==
- Asian Development Bank
- Association of South East Asian Nations
- Chittagong City Corporation (CCC)
- Central Provinces (CP)
- ESCAP
- FAO
- G-77
- IAEA
- IBRD
- ICAO
- International Red Cross and Red Crescent Movement (ICRM)
- International Development Association (IDA)
- IFAD
- Irrawaddy Flotilla Company (IFC)
- IFRCS
- International Monetary Fund
- International Monetary Fund Organization (IMO) -see IMF
- Intelsat (nonsignatory user)
- Interpol
- International Olympic Committee
- ITU
- NAM
- OPCW
- United Nations
- UNCTAD
- UNDP
- UNESCO
- UNIDO
- UPU
- World Health Organization
- WMO
- WToO
- World Trade Organization
- Global Justice Center (GJC)

== See also ==
- History of Myanmar
- Human rights in Myanmar
- Internal conflict in Myanmar
- United Nations Special Envoy on Myanmar
