= Myint Naung =

Burmese politician

Wunna Kyawhtin, Brigadier General (Retd.) Myint Naung

Minister for Labour
- In office 3 August 2023 – 31 January 2025
- Appointed by: State Administration Council
- Prime Minister: Min Aung Hlaing
- Preceded by: Pwint San
- Succeeded by: Chit Swe

Personal details
- Born: 1960 (age 65–66)
- Occupation: Politician
- Profession: Retired Military Officer, Diplomat
- Awards: Wunna Kyawhtin (2022)

Military service
- Rank: Brigadier General

Myint Naung (born 1960) is a Burmese politician, retired brigadier general, and diplomat who served as the 36th Union Minister for Labour from August 2023 to January 2025. He previously spent a decade serving as a high-ranking diplomat.

== Military career ==
Myint Naung graduated from the Defence Services Academy and rose to the rank of Brigadier General in the Myanmar Army. During his military service, he was accused by the Karen Human Rights Group (KHRG) of being responsible for military operations in Kayin State that led to the displacement of local civilians. In 2011, the Mail & Guardian newspaper reported that he was involved in the crackdown on the Saffron Revolution in 2007.

== Diplomatic career ==
In 2011, during the administration of President Thein Sein, Myint Naung retired from the military and transferred to the Ministry of Foreign Affairs as an ambassador. He was subsequently appointed as the Myanmar Ambassador to South Africa.

His appointment to South Africa faced significant opposition from civil society organizations and South African opposition parties, who called for an investigation into his past human rights record. He later served as the Myanmar Ambassador to Italy before retiring from the foreign service on 9 May 2019.

== Political career ==
Following the 2021 military coup, Myint Naung was appointed as the Union Minister for Labour by the State Administration Council on 3 August 2023. He held this position until 31 January 2025.

== Awards ==
In November 2022, he was conferred the Wunna Kyawhtin by the State Administration Council for his distinguished service.
