= Ministry of the State Administration Council Chairman's Office =

Government ministry under the State Administration Council formed in 2024

Ministry of the State Administration Council Chairman’s Office
- နိုင်ငံတော်စီမံအုပ်ချုပ်ရေးကောင်စီဥက္ကဋ္ဌရုံးဝန်ကြီးဌာန
- State Seal of Myanmar

Agency overview
- Formed: 8 January 2024
- Dissolved: July 31, 2025
- Type: Ministry
- Jurisdiction: Government of Myanmar
- Headquarters: Naypyidaw, Myanmar
- Minister responsible: Moe Aung Ko Ko Hlaing Maung Maung Tin Aung Kyaw Hoe

The Ministry of the State Administration Council Chairman's Office (Burmese: နိုင်ငံတော်စီမံအုပ်ချုပ်ရေးကောင်စီဥက္ကဋ္ဌရုံးဝန်ကြီးဌာန) was a ministry responsible for handling the affairs of the Office of the Chairman of the State Administration Council. It was established on 8 January 2024, nearly three years after the military coup. The ministry was formed to replace the former Union Government Office Ministries (1) and (2).

== Structure ==
- Ministry of the State Administration Council Chairman's Office (1)
- Ministry of the State Administration Council Chairman's Office (2)
- Ministry of the State Administration Council Chairman's Office (3)
- Ministry of the State Administration Council Chairman's Office (4)

== List of ministers ==
No.	Ministry	Union Minister	Term Duration		State President	Deputy Minister	Notes
No.	Ministry	Union Minister	Start date	End date	State President	Deputy Minister	Notes
1	Ministry (1) of the Office of the Chairman of the State Administration Council	U Ko Ko Hlaing	8 January 2024	5 May 2024	U Myint Swe (Acting)Min Aung Hlaing Pro Tem President (On Duty)		
1	Ministry (1) of the Office of the Chairman of the State Administration Council	Moe Aung	5 May 2024	31 July 2025	U Myint Swe (Acting)Min Aung Hlaing Pro Tem President (On Duty)	Also serving as National Security Advisor	
2	Ministry (2) of the Office of the Chairman of the State Administration Council	U Aung Naing Oo	8 January 2024	5 May 2024	U Myint Swe (Acting)Min Aung Hlaing Pro Tem President (On Duty)		
2	Ministry (2) of the Office of the Chairman of the State Administration Council	U Ko Ko Hlaing	5 May 2024	31 July 2025	U Myint Swe (Acting)Min Aung Hlaing Pro Tem President (On Duty)		
3	Ministry (3) of the Office of the Chairman of the State Administration Council	U Aung Kyaw Hoe	22 January 2024	5 May 2024	U Myint Swe (Acting)Min Aung Hlaing Pro Tem President (On Duty)		
3	Ministry (3) of the Office of the Chairman of the State Administration Council	U Aung Naing Oo	5 May 2024	27 May 2024	U Myint Swe (Acting)Min Aung Hlaing Pro Tem President (On Duty)		
3	Ministry (3) of the Office of the Chairman of the State Administration Council	U Maung Maung Tint	31 January 2025	31 July 2025	U Myint Swe (Acting)Min Aung Hlaing Pro Tem President (On Duty)	U Htin Kyaw Thu	
4	Ministry (4) of the Office of the Chairman of the State Administration Council	Moe Aung	8 January 2024	5 May 2024	U Myint Swe (Acting)Min Aung Hlaing Pro Tem President (On Duty)		
4	Ministry (4) of the Office of the Chairman of the State Administration Council	U Aung Kyaw Hoe	5 May 2024	31 July 2025	U Myint Swe (Acting)Min Aung Hlaing Pro Tem President (On Duty)		

== Dissolution ==
Following the dissolution of the State Administration Council on 31 July 2025, the new cabinet do not have this portfolio but replaced with Ministries for Office of the President, in anticipation of the upcoming election in December 2025.
