= Ministry of Labour, Employment and Social Security =

The Ministry of Labour, Employment and Social Security is a ministry of labor of different countries:

- Ministry of Labour, Employment and Social Security (Argentina)
- Ministry of Labour, Employment and Social Security (Myanmar)
- Ministry of Labour, Employment and Social Security (Nepal)
