= Myint Kyaing =

Burmese politician

- မြင့်ကြိုင်

Union Minister of Ministry of Immigration and Population
- Incumbent
- Assumed office 19 August 2022
- Prime Minister: Min Aung Hlaing
- Preceded by: Khin Yi

Union Minister of Ministry of Labour, Immigration and Population
- In office 1 February 2021 – 1 August 2021
- Preceded by: Thein Swe
- Succeeded by: Himself (MOL); Khin Yi (MOIP)

Union Minister of Ministry of Labor
- In office 1 August 2021 – 19 August 2022
- Preceded by: Himself (MOLIP)
- Succeeded by: Pwint San

Deputy Minister of Ministry of Labor, Immigration and Population
- In office 4 February 2020 – 1 February 2021

Myint Kyaing is the current union minister of Ministry of Immigration and Population of Myanmar. He also served as union minister of Ministry of Labour and Ministry of Labour, Immigration and Population.

== Career ==
He was the permanent secretary of the Ministry of Labour, Immigration and Population (MOLIP). After his retirement, he was appointed as the deputy minister for MOLIP on 4 February 2020 by Win Myint . Following the 2021 Myanmar coup d'état, Myint Kyaing was dismissed on 1 February 2021 by Min Aung Hlaing, and was appointed as union minister of MOLIP on this day. On 1 August 2021, the management committee of the State Administration Council was replaced with the Provisional Government of Myanmar, and the Ministry of Labour, Immigration and Population was reorganized as Ministry of Labour and Ministry of Immigration and Population. Myint Kyaing became the Minister of Labour. On 19 August 2022, he was moved to Ministry of Immigration and Population.

== U.S. sanctions ==
On 2 July 2021, the U.S. Department of the Treasury added Myint Kyaing to its Specially Designated Nationals (SDN) list. Individuals on the list have their assets blocked and U.S. persons are generally prohibited from dealing with them.
