= Mon Nationalism and Civil War in Burma =

Mon Nationalism and Civil War in Burma: The Golden Sheldrake
- Author: Ashley South
- Language: English
- Subject: Mon people/Politics of Burma
- Genre: Political
- Publisher: RoutledgeCurzon
- Publication date: 2003
- Publication place: Great Britain
- Media type: Hardcover/paperback
- Pages: 288

Mon Nationalism and Civil War in Burma: The Golden Sheldrake is a book by Ashley South on the history of the Mon people, an ethnic group native to Myanmar (previously known as Burma) and Thailand. Published in 2003, it covers their history from the pre-colonial era up to the time of writing, with an emphasis on the development of Mon nationalist movements in the 20th century.

South, an independent consultant and analyst, specializes in ethnic politics, displacement and humanitarian issues in Burma. Currently, his research on displacement in Burma is funded by the John D. and Catherine T. MacArthur Foundation.
