= Dică =

Dică, Dicá, or DICA may refer to:

- Dicá (born 1947), Brazilian football midfielder
- Emil Dică (born 1982), Romanian former football defensive midfielder
- Nicolae Dică (born 1980), Romanian football manager and former football attacking midfielder and forward
- Directorate of Investment and Company Administration, government agency of Myanmar
