= Aung Kyaw Hoe =

Burmese army general and government official (born 1967)

His Excellency Brigadier General Wunna Kyaw Htin Aung Kyaw Hoe
- အောင်ကျော်ဟိုး

Union Minister, Ministry of the State Administration Council Chairman’s Office (3)
- In office 22 January 2024 – 5 May 2024
- Preceded by: Admiral Moe Aung
- Succeeded by: Aung Naing Oo

Union Minister, Ministry of the State Administration Council Chairman’s Office (4)
- In office 5 May 2024 – Incumbent
- Preceded by: Admiral Moe Aung

Permanent Secretary, Ministry of Defence
- In office April 2015 – 22 January 2024
- Preceded by: Myo Min
- Succeeded by: Aung Naing Oo

Personal details
- Born: 1967 (age 58–59) Myanmar (Burma)
- Education: Officers Training School (77th intake)
- Awards: Wunna Kyaw Htin (2023)

Military service
- Allegiance: Myanmar
- Branch/service: Myanmar Army
- Years of service: 1988–2024
- Rank: Brigadier General (retired)

Aung Kyaw Hoe (Burmese: အောင်ကျော်ဟိုး; pronounced [àʊɴ tɕɔ̀ wé]; born 1967) is a retired Burmese army general and government official who currently serves as Union Minister for the Office of the Chairman of the State Administration Council (4). Prior to this, he held various senior government and military posts, including Minister for the Office of the Chairman of the State Administration Council (3) and Permanent Secretary of the Ministry of Defense. He was awarded the honorary title of Wunna Kyaw Htin in 2023.

== Early life and education ==
Aung Kyaw Hoe was born in 1967 in Myanmar. He graduated from the Officers Training School No. 77 (OTS-77), which prepares commissioned officers for service in the Myanmar Armed Forces. His military education laid the foundation for a career spanning over three decades in administrative and leadership roles within the Ministry of Defence.

== Military career ==
Aung Kyaw Hoe joined the Myanmar Armed Forces in 1988 after graduating from Officers Training School 77 (OTS-77). He served in the military for more than 30 years, holding several key positions. In April 2015, he was appointed Permanent Secretary of the Ministry of Defense with the rank of brigadier general. While serving in this role, he stated at a 2018 press conference that the military was prepared to cease hostilities if directed by the president.

== Government service ==
On 22 January 2024, Aung Kyaw Hoe retired from military service and was appointed Union Minister for the Office of the Chairman of the State Administration Council (3), transitioning from his previous role as Permanent Secretary of the Ministry of Defense. On 5 May 2024, he was reassigned as Union Minister for the Office of the Chairman of the State Administration Council (4), replacing General Moe Aung. His successor in the Ministry (3) position was Aung Naing Oo.

== Awards ==
On 4 January 2023, the State Administration Council conferred upon Aung Kyaw Hoe the honorary title of Wunna Kyaw Htin.
