= Pwint San =

Burmese politician (born 1961)

Dr Pwint San
- ပွင့်ဆန်း

Minister of Labour
- Incumbent
- Assumed office 19 August 2022
- President: Myint Swe (acting)
- Prime Minister: Min Aung Hlaing
- Preceded by: Myint Kyaing

Minister for Commerce
- In office 3 February 2021 – 19 August 2022
- President: Myint Swe (acting)
- Prime Minister: Min Aung Hlaing
- Preceded by: Than Myint
- Succeeded by: Aung Naing Oo

Personal details
- Born: 13 July 1961 (age 65) Rangoon, Burma
- Party: Union Solidarity and Development Party
- Spouse: 1
- Children: 2
- Cabinet: Min Aung Hlaing's military cabinet

Pwint San (Burmese: ပွင့်ဆန်း, also spelt Pwint Hsan; born 13 July 1961 in Rangoon, Burma) is now retired from his previous position Minister of Labour of Myanmar after he was dismissed from his duties in 2023. He served as Minister for Commerce from 3 February 2021 to 19 August 2022 in the aftermath of the 2021 Myanmar coup d'état in the Burmese military junta's cabinet.

== Career ==
Pwint San is a medical doctor by training, and later became a businessman. In the 2020 general election, he became a politician of the Burmese military's proxy party, the Union Solidarity and Development Party, and won a seat of Pyithu Hluttaw for Mayangon Township. He later served as a deputy commerce minister during Thein Sein's presidency. He subsequently became a central executive in the USDP.

In the 2015 general election, he ran for House of Representatives seat from Manyangone Township but lost. In the 2020 general election, he ran as a candidate for Mayangone constituency No. 2, representing the Union Solidarity and Development Party but defeated the National League for Democracy candidate by a landslide.

In the aftermath of the 2021 Myanmar coup d'état, he was appointed as Minister for Commerce on 3 February 2021. One of his sons has publicly disowned his father, stating that he cannot condone his father's association with the military council responsible for the killing of protesters.

=== Sanctions ===
On 17 May 2021, the U.S. Department of the Treasury added Pwint San to its Specially Designated Nationals (SDN) list.

On 20 July 2023, the EU countries imposed personal sanctions on San, citing his continued contributions to serious human rights violations in Myanmar as Union Minister of Labour and previously Minister of Commerce in the junta-appointed government. He was accused of abusing his authority powers to target workers associated with various opposition movements, restricting supply of goods within the country and providing economic means to sustain junta's illegal seizure of power.

== Personal life ==
He is married to one women and has two children with familie.
