= Ministry of Labour, Immigration and Population =

Former Government ministry in Myanmar

- အလုပ်သမား၊ လူဝင်မှုကြီးကြပ်ရေးနှင့် ပြည်သူ့အင်အား ဝန်ကြီးဌာန

Agency overview
- Formed: 30 March 2016; 10 years ago
- Dissolved: 1 August 2021
- Type: Ministry
- Jurisdiction: Government of Myanmar
- Headquarters: Naypyidaw
- Website: www.mip.gov.mm; www.mol.gov.mm

Ministry of Labour, Immigration and Population (Burmese: အလုပ်သမား၊ လူဝင်မှုကြီးကြပ်ရေးနှင့် ပြည်သူ့အင်အား ဝန်ကြီးဌာန) was a ministry which administered Myanmar's Labour affairs, Immigration affairs, Census and National Registration Card (NRC) system.

It was formed by combining of Ministry of Labour, Employment and Social Security and Ministry of Immigration and Population by President U Htin Kyaw on 30 March 2016. On 1 August 2021, following the military coup, SAC regrouped into two ministries, Ministry of Labour and Ministry of Immigration and Population.

== Departments ==
- Union Minister Office
- Department of Immigration
- Department of Population
- Department of Labour
- Social Security Board
- Factories and General Labour Laws Inspection Department
- Department of Labour Relations
- Department of National Registration and Citizenship

== See also ==
- Cabinet of Myanmar
