= Ko Ko (minister) =

Former Burmese politician and general

His Excellency Lieutenant General Ko Ko
- ကိုကို

Minister of Home Affairs of Myanmar
- In office 30 March 2011 – 30 March 2016
- Preceded by: Major General Maung Oo
- Succeeded by: Kyaw Swe

Chief of Bureau of Special Operations 3
- In office 23 June 2008 – 30 March 2016

Minister for Immigration and Population
- In office 14 August 2015 – 30 March 2016
- Preceded by: Khin Yi
- Succeeded by: Thein Swe

Personal details
- Born: 10 March 1956 (age 70) Mandalay, Burma
- Party: None
- Spouse: Sao Nwan Khun Sum
- Education: Defence Services Academy

Military service
- Allegiance: Myanmar
- Branch/service: Myanmar Army
- Rank: Lieutenant General

Ko Ko (Burmese: ကိုကို; born 10 March 1956) was the Minister for Home Affairs of Myanmar (Burma) from 2011 to 2016. He retired as a Lieutenant General on 30 March 2016 from the Myanmar Army.
