= Ministry of Social Welfare, Relief and Resettlement =

Government ministry of Myanmar

- လူမှုဝန်ထမ်းကယ်ဆယ်ရေးနှင့်ပြန်လည် နေရာချထားရေး ဝန်ကြီးဌာန
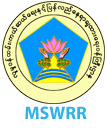

Agency overview
- Type: Ministry
- Jurisdiction: Union Government of Myanmar
- Headquarters: Nay Pyi Taw
- Minister responsible: Dr Soe Win, Union Minister for Social Welfare, Relief and Resettlement
- Deputy Minister responsible: Soe Kyi, Deputy Minister for Social Welfare, Relief and Resettlement
- Website: www.moswrr.gov.mm

The Ministry of Social Welfare, Relief and Resettlement (Burmese: လူမှုဝန်ထမ်းကယ်ဆယ်ရေးနှင့်ပြန်လည် နေရာချထားရေး ဝန်ကြီးဌာန) is a ministry that administers Myanmar's social welfare, relief and resettlement affairs.

The Ministry of Social Welfare, Relief and Resettlement is currently led by Dr Soe Win, who was appointed by Chairman of the State Administration Council Min Aung Hlaing on 3 August 2023.

== Ministers ==
No	Name	Term start	Term end
(1)	U Ba Saw	7 September 1953	27 February 1959
(2)	U Loon Baw	27 February 1959	4 April 1960
(3)	U Ba Saw	4 April 1960	2 March 1962
(4)	Colonel Saw Myint	5 March 1962	3 December 1963
(5)	Colonel Mg Lwin	3 December 1963	24 March 1970
(6)	Brigadier General Tin Pe	24 March 1970	14 November 1970
(7)	Brigadier General Thaung Dan	14 November 1970	4 March 1974
(8)	U Van Khuu	4 March 1974	3 March 1978
(9)	U Man San Myat Shwe	3 March 1978	20 March 1979
(10)	U Mya Maung	20 March 1979	28 January 1980
(11)	Brigadier Khin Ohnn	28 January 1980	16 October 1980
(12)	General Chit Hlaing	16 October 1980	9 November 1981
(13)	U Ohnn Kyaw	9 November 1981	18 September 1988
(14)	Dy General Aung Ye Kyaw	20 September 1988	9 February 1989
15	Deputy General Tin Htun	9 February 1989	19 February 1992
16	Brigadier General Thuang Myint	19 February 1992	15 June 1995
17	General Soe Myin	15 June 1995	15 January 1997
18	Brigadier General Pyae Sone	15 January 1997	29 October 1999
19	General Sein Htwar	29 October 1999	14 May 2006
20	General Maung Maung Swe	15 May 2006	31 March 2011
21	U Aung Kyi	From 31 March 2011	27 August 2012
22	Dr. Daw Myat Myat Ohn Khin	7 September 2012	31 March 2016
23	Dr.Win Myat Aye	1 April 2016	1 February 2021
24	Dr.Thet Thet Khine	4 February 2021	2 August 2023
25	Dr Soe Win	3 August 2023	Incumbent

== Departments ==
- Union Minister Office
- Department of Social Welfare
- Department of Disaster Management
- Department of Rehabilitation

== See also ==
- Cabinet of Burma
