= Ministry of Immigration and Population =

Government ministry of Myanmar

- လူဝင်မှုကြီးကြပ်ရေးနှင့် ပြည်သူ့အင်အား ဝန်ကြီးဌာန

Agency overview
- Formed: 1 August 2021; 5 years ago
- Type: Ministry
- Jurisdiction: Government of Myanmar
- Headquarters: Office No (48), Naypyidaw
- Minister responsible: Myint Kyaing
- Website: www.mip.gov.mm

The Ministry of Immigration and Population (Burmese: လူဝင်မှုကြီးကြပ်ရေးနှင့် ပြည်သူ့အင်အား ဝန်ကြီးဌာန; abbreviated MIP) is a government ministry of Myanmar which administers immigration affairs, including the National Registration Card (NRC) system. The ministry was formed in 2021.

The ministry's motto is "A fissure in the earth will not open up and swallow a race to extinction; a race only disappears by being swallowed by another"

== History ==
The Census Office was formed on 24 February 1950. On 1 September 1950, it was combined with Central Statistics and Economics Department under Ministry of National Planning. On 1 June 1957, the Ministry of Immigration and National Registration was formed" and Census Office was moved to this ministry on 31 December 1958. On 15 March 1972, Ministry of Home Affairs, Ministry of Democracy Local Administration, Ministry of Immigration and National Registration and Ministry of Religious Affairs were combined as one ministry, Ministry of Home Affairs and Religious Affairs under the new form of socialist rule. Ministry of Immigration and National Registration became Department of Immigration and Population (DIP).

On 20 March 1992, SLORC reconstituted Ministry of Home Affairs and Religious Affairs as Ministry of Home Affairs and Ministry of Religious Affairs. DIP was organized under the Ministry of Home Affairs. On 15 June 1995, DIP was separated and formed as Ministry of Immigration and Population with Department of Immigration and National Registration. In 1998, the Census Division and Survey and Computer Division were formed as Department of Population.

On 30 March 2016, President Htin Kyaw combined Ministry of Labour, Employment and Social Security and Ministry of Immigration and Population as Ministry of Labour, Immigration and Population (MLIP) following the formation of a new cabinet.

On 1 August 2021, caretaker government was formed and the State Administration Council reconstituted the MLIP as the Ministry of Labour and the Ministry of Immigration and Population.

== Departments ==
- Department of Immigration
- Department of Population
- Department of National Registration and Citizenship

== Ministers (2011 - Current) ==
- Khin Yi (30 March 2011 - 12 August 2015)
- Ko Ko (14 August 2015 - 30 March 2016)
- Thein Swe (30 March 2016 - 1 February 2021) (as MLIP)
- Myint Kyaing (1 February 2021 - 1 August 2021) (as MLIP)
- Khin Yi (1 August 2021 - 19 August 2022)
- Myint Kyaing (19 August 2022 - Present)

== See also ==
- Cabinet of Myanmar
