= Chairman of the State Administration Council =

Head of the military junta of Myanmar from 2021 to 2025

- နိုင်ငံတော်စီမံအုပ်ချုပ်ရေးကောင်စီဥက္ကဋ္ဌ
- State Seal of Myanmar
- State Administration Council
- Type: Military junta leader
- Status: Office abolished
- Abbreviation: SAC Chairman
- Reports to: Commander-in-Chief of Defence Services
- Residence: Presidential Palace
- Seat: Naypyidaw
- Appointer: Commander-in-Chief of Defence Services exercising emergency powers
- Term length: Concurrent with the state of emergency
- Constituting instrument: CinCDS Order No (9/2021)
- Precursor: State Counsellor of Myanmar
- Formation: 2 February 2021
- First holder: Min Aung Hlaing
- Final holder: Min Aung Hlaing
- Abolished: 31 July 2025
- Deputy: Vice Chairman

The chairman of the State Administration Council (Burmese: နိုင်ငံတော်စီမံအုပ်ချုပ်ရေးကောင်စီဥက္ကဋ္ဌ) was the head of the State Administration Council, Myanmar's military junta from 2021 to 2025, established following the 2021 coup d'état. Min Aung Hlaing was the only holder of the office, and also served as the prime minister of the Provisional Government.

== Background ==
On 1 February 2021, the Tatmadaw (military of Myanmar) launched a coup against the democratically elected government of Myanmar's ruling party, the National League for Democracy. The leader of the coup, Min Aung Hlaing, became the de facto leader of the state after the coup. A day after the coup, Min Aung Hlaing formalized his leadership by forming the State Administration Council, in which he assumed office as the chairman.

== Powers ==
As Min Aung Hlaing concurrently held office as the Commander-in-Chief of the Myanmar Armed Forces, he has the right to exercise legislative, judicative, and executive powers. His chairman office exercises his legislative power.

== Chairman ==
Portrait	Name (birth–death)	Term of office			Deputy(s)
Portrait	Name (birth–death)	Took office	Left office	Time in office	Deputy(s)
	Min Aung Hlaing (born 1956)	2 February 2021	31 July 2025	4 years, 179 days	Soe Win

== Vice Chairman ==
Vice Chairman of the State Administration Council
- State Seal of Myanmar
- State Administration Council
- Type: Military junta deputy leader
- Status: Office abolished
- Abbreviation: SAC Vice Chairman
- Reports to: Chairman
- Seat: Naypyidaw
- Appointer: Commander-in-Chief of Defence Services exercising emergency powers
- Term length: Concurrent with the state of emergency
- Constituting instrument: CinCDS Order No (9/2021)
- Formation: 2 February 2021
- First holder: Soe Win
- Final holder: Soe Win
- Abolished: 31 July 2025
- Superseded by: Vice Chairman of the State Security and Peace Commission

The vice chairman of the State Administration Council was the junta's second-ranked official.

Portrait	Name (birth–death)	Term of office			Chairman
Portrait	Name (birth–death)	Took office	Left office	Time in office	Chairman
	Soe Win (born 1960)	2 February 2021	31 July 2025	4 years, 179 days	Min Aung Hlaing

== See also ==
- Ministry of the State Administration Council Chairman's Office
- Politics of Myanmar
- President of Myanmar
- Vice President of Myanmar
- Prime Minister of Myanmar
- State Counsellor of Myanmar
- Chairman of the State Security and Peace Commission
- Ministry of State Counsellor’s Office
- Council of State
