= Chit Naing =

Burmese writer and politician

- ချစ်နိုင်

Union Minister for Ministry of Union Government Office (2)
- Incumbent
- Assumed office 1 August 2021
- Prime Minister: Min Aung Hlaing
- Preceded by: position established

Union Minister of Information
- In office 1 February 2021 – 1 August 2021
- President: Myint Swe (acting)
- Preceded by: Pe Myint
- Succeeded by: Maung Maung Ohn

Personal details
- Born: December 1948 (age 77) Kyi Ni Village, Chauk Township, Magway Division
- Occupation: politician, writer

Chit Naing is a Burmese politician, writer and Minister of Union Government Office. He previously served as a former Minister of Information.

== Early life and education ==
He was born in December 1948 in Kyi Ni Village, Chauk Township, Magway Division. He studied basic education at Government Middle School in Kyi Ni village, No (11) High School in Chauk.He attended Mandalay University of Arts and Sciences (MASU) and he holds a bachelor's degree in psychology.

== Service life ==
=== Military services ===
He joined the military in 1971 after graduated in 1970. He served in Lashio, Mingalardon, Nawnghkio, Bahtoo and Kalaw. He has served in Shan State for over 17 years.

=== Literature ===
From August 1995 to November 1997, he served as the Executive Editor-in-Chief of the Myawaddy Literature House, which deals with the military. Since 1984, he has been writing articles on social psychology and youth counseling.He was awarded the 1996 National Literature Prize for youth affairs with his book, "Chit Lo Pyaw Tar Hmat Par".

In 1999, he led a delegation of Myanmar writers on a friendly visit to the People's Republic of China.He served as the Central Executive Committee of the Myanmar Literature and Press Association.He also served as the director general of Information and Public Relations Department from 1997 to 2009.

=== Union Minister ===
After the military seized power on February 1, 2021, he was appointed as Union Minister of Information in the newly formed military government. When the caretaker government was formed on 1 August 2021, he was changed from the Minister of Information to the Minister of the Union Government Office (2).
