= Maung Maung Ohn =

Burmese politician (born 1950)

- မောင်မောင်အုန်း
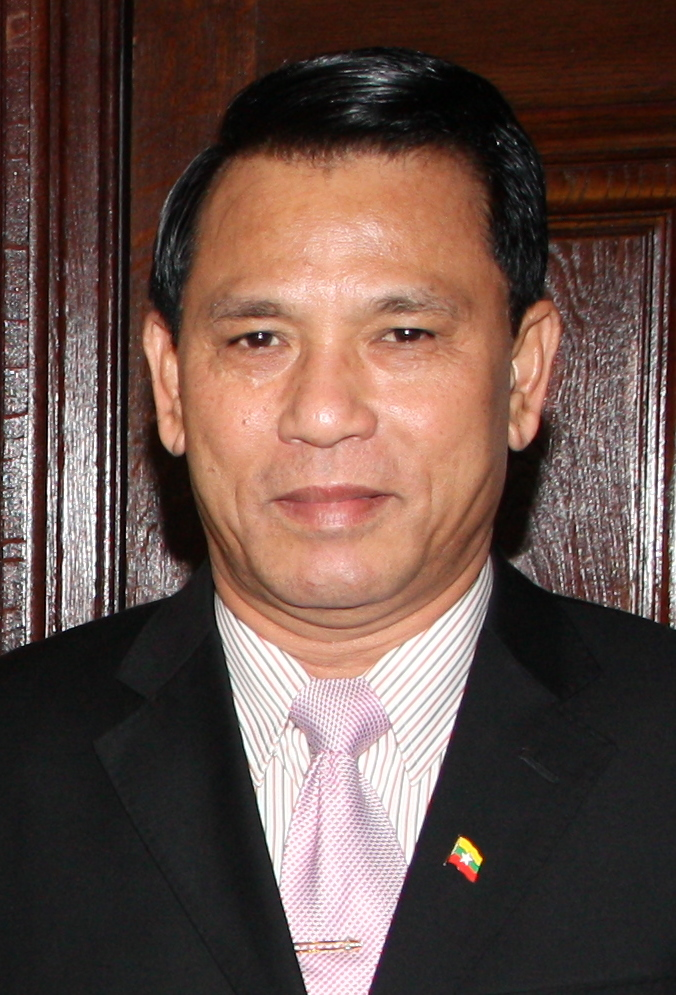
- Maung Maung Ohn in 2014

Deputy Speaker of the Pyithu Hluttaw
- Incumbent
- Assumed office 16 March 2026
- Leader: Khin Yi
- Preceded by: Tun Tun Hein

Member of the Pyithu Hluttaw for Tatkon Township
- Incumbent
- Assumed office 16 March 2026
- Preceded by: Vacant

Union Minister of Information
- In office 1 August 2021 – 16 March 2026
- Prime Minister: Min Aung Hlaing; Nyo Saw
- Preceded by: Chit Naing

Union Minister of Hotels and Tourism
- In office 7 February 2021 – 5 August 2021
- Leader: Min Aung Hlaing
- Preceded by: Ohn Maung
- Succeeded by: Htay Aung

2nd Chief Minister of Rakhine State
- In office 1 July 2014 – 30 March 2016
- President: Thein Sein
- Preceded by: Hla Maung Tin
- Succeeded by: Nyi Pu

Deputy Minister of Home Affairs
- In office 25 July 2013 – 25 June 2014

Personal details
- Born: May 30, 1950 (age 76) Myanmar
- Party: Union Solidarity and Development
- Cabinet: Nyo Saw's cabinet (2025-2016)

Military service
- Branch/service: Myanmar Army
- Rank: Major General

Maung Maung Ohn (Burmese: မောင်မောင်အုန်း, born 30 May 1950) is a Burmese politician who has been serving as the Deputy Speaker of the Pyithu Hluttaw since 16 March 2026. He previously held the position of Union Minister for Information from 2021 to 2026.

He has served as the union minister of Hotels and Tourism from February 2021 to August 2021 and Chief Minister of Rakhine State, Myanmar from 2014 to 2016. He is a Myanmar Army general and former Deputy Minister of Home Affairs.

He replaced Hla Maung Tin, whose resignation was announced by Burmese state-run media on 20 June 2014. Maung Maung Ohn is an ethnic Burman, despite demands from the Rakhine National Party that the post be held by an ethnic Rakhine who is also an elected member of parliament and party member. Maung Maung Ohn was nominated by President Thein Sein for the post, and confirmed by the Rakhine State Hluttaw on 30 June.

Maung Maung Ohn ran and was elected as the Union Solidarity and Development Party candidate for Pyithu Hluttaw in Tatkon Township, Naypyidaw Union Territory, in the 2025–26 Myanmar general election, considered a sham process by independent observers.
