= Soe Win (physician) =

Burmese politician

Major General (Retd.) Thiri Pyanchi, Dr. Soe Win

Ministry of Health
- Incumbent
- Assumed office 9 October 2026
- Appointed by: National Defence and Security Council
- Deputy: Dr. Tin Tun
- Appointed by: State Administration Council
- Preceded by: Thet Khine Win

Deputy Minister of the Chairman of the State Administration Council
- In office 23 July 2023 – 3 August 2023

Deputy Minister of the Ministry of Sports and Youth Affairs (Myanmar)
- In office 19 August 2022 – 23 July 2023

Personal details
- Awards: Zeya Kyawhtin (2016); Wunna Kyawhtin; Thiri Pyanchi (2025)

Military service
- Allegiance: Myanmar
- Branch/service: Myanmar Army
- Rank: Major General

Soe Win (စိုးဝင်း ) is a Burmese politician and retired military officer who is currently serving as the Union Minister for Ministry of Health

== Military career ==
Soe Win served as the Director of the Directorate of Medical Services under the Commander-in-chief. He retired with the rank of Major General and was known to be the personal physician of Senior General Min Aung Hlaing.

== Political career ==
=== Deputy Minister ===
On 19 August 2022, the State Administration Council appointed Soe Win as the Deputy Minister for the Ministry of Sports and Youth Affairs. In July 2023, he was transferred to the Office of the Chairman of the State Administration Council as a Deputy Minister.

=== Union Minister ===
Following the cabinet reshuffle on 3 August 2023, Soe Win was appointed as the Union Minister for Social Welfare, Relief and Resettlement. After the reconstitution of the government under the Nyo Saw administration on 31 July 2025, he was reappointed to the same position.

== Awards and honors ==
In 2016, President Thein Sein awarded him the Zeya Kyawhtin, a military honor for distinguished service. In April 2025, he was conferred the Thiri Pyanchi by the State Administration Council.
