= Directorate of Investment and Company Administration =

Government agency of Myanmar

- ရင်းနှီးမြှုပ်နှံမှုနှင့်ကုမ္ပဏီများညွှန်ကြားမှုဦးစီးဌာန

Agency overview
- Formed: October 13, 1993; 32 years ago
- Jurisdiction: Republic of the Union of Myanmar
- Headquarters: No.1, Thissa Road, Yankin Township, Yangon
- Agency executive: Director-General
- Parent agency: Ministry of Investment and Foreign Economic Relations (MIFER)

The Directorate of Investment and Company Administration (DICA; Burmese: ရင်းနှီးမြှုပ်နှံမှုနှင့်ကုမ္ပဏီများညွှန်ကြားမှုဦးစီးဌာန), a government agency formerly under the Ministry of Investment and Foreign Economic Relations, is Myanmar's company register. The Ministry of National Planning, Investment and Foreign Economic Relations is now the direct overseer of the Directorate of Investment and Company Administration. DICA was formed on 13 October 1993, and serves as the primary interface between businesses and the government.

In February 2021, Distributed Denial of Secrets gave journalists financial documents from DICA showing Google was indirectly supporting the Myanmar coup by allowing Gmail addresses and Google run blogs to be used to run companies owned and operated by Myanmar's military and coup leaders. After the public release of the 330 gigabyte leak, Google disabled the blog. A Google spokesperson told Insider, "In this case, we have terminated accounts as a result of President Biden's Executive Order of 11 February 2021 concerning Myanmar." Justice For Myanmar called the release "biggest leak in Myanmar history."
