= Khin Yi =

Burmese politician (born 1952)

- ခင်ရီ
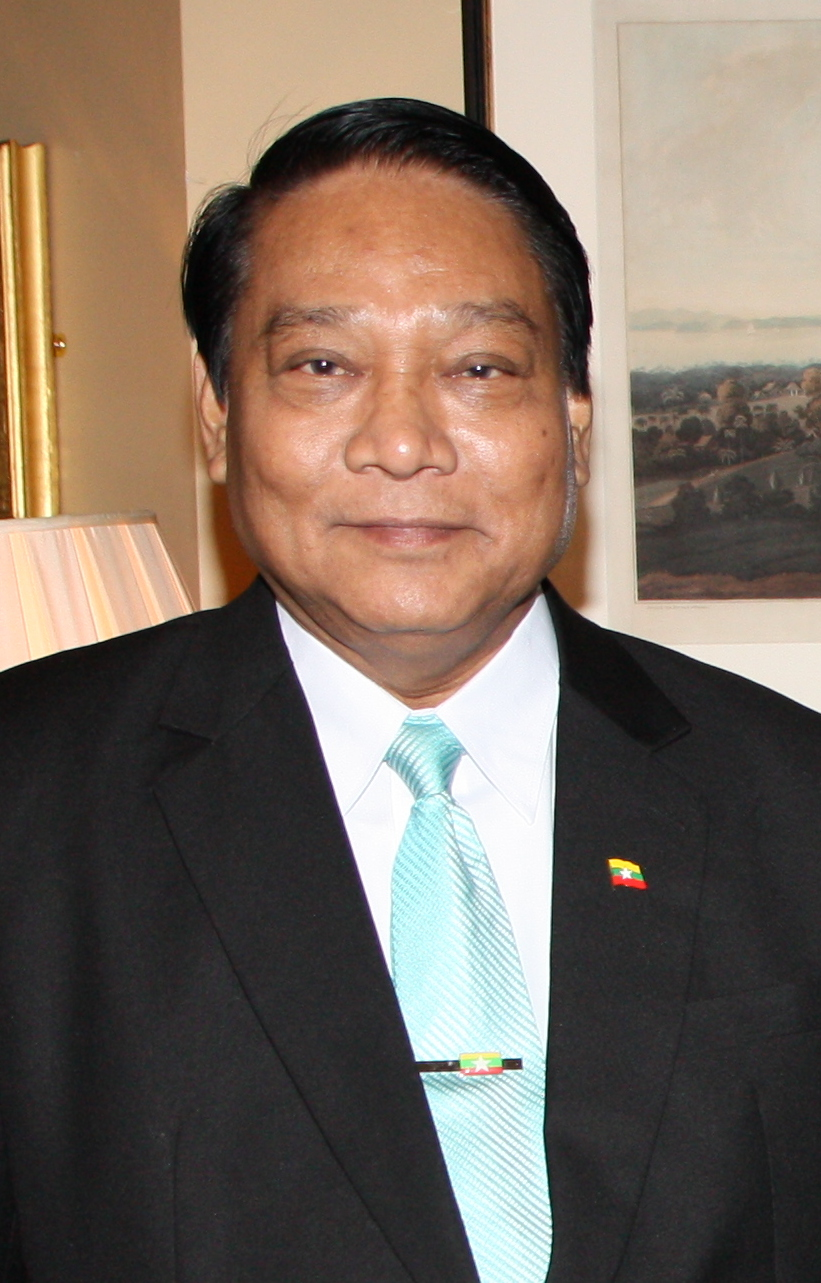
- Khin Yi in 2014

4th Speaker of the Pyithu Hluttaw
- Incumbent
- Assumed office 16 March 2026
- Deputy: Maung Maung Ohn
- Preceded by: T Khun Myat

Chairman of the Union Solidarity and Development Party
- Incumbent
- Assumed office 5 October 2022 (Note: Acting: 12 September – 5 October 2022)
- Vice Chairman: Myat Hein
- Preceded by: Than Htay
Other offices held
Vice Chairman of the Union Solidarity and Development Party
In office 31 December 2019 – 5 October 2022 Serving with Myat Hein
Chairman	Than Htay
Minister of Immigration and Population
In office 1 August 2021 – 19 August 2022
President	Myint Swe (acting)
Prime Minister	Min Aung Hlaing
Preceded by	Myint Kyaing
Succeeded by	Myint Kyaing
In office 30 March 2011 – 12 August 2015
President	Thein Sein
Preceded by	Mg Oo
Succeeded by	Ko Ko
Chief of the Myanmar Police Force
In office 30 April 2002 – 30 March 2011
Preceded by	Soe Win
Succeeded by	Zaw Win

Member of the Pyithu Hluttaw for Zeyathiri
- Incumbent
- Assumed office 16 March 2026
- Preceded by: Hla Htay Win (2021)

Personal details
- Born: 29 December 1952 (age 73) Myaungmya, Burma
- Party: USDP
- Spouse: Khin May Soe
- Children: 3
- Education: Yangon University of Economics (BA); Defense Services Academy
- Profession: Politician; military officer

Military service
- Allegiance: Myanmar
- Branch/service: Myanmar Army
- Years of service: 1976–2010
- Rank: Brigadier general

Khin Yi (Note: Burmese: ခင်ရီ) (born 29 December 1952) is a Burmese politician and former military officer who has served as the fourth speaker and Member of the Pyithu Hluttaw for Zeyathiri since 2026, and Chairman of Union Solidarity and Development Party (USDP) since 2022. He was previously Minister of Immigration and Population from 2011 to 2015 and again fron 2021 to 2022, and was also Chief of the Myanmar Police Force from 2002 to 2011.

Born into a farming family in Myaungmya, Khin Yi graduated from the Yangon University of Economics in 1972 with a bachelor's degree in economics. He then joined the 17th cadet course in the Defense Services Academy later that year, graduating four years later in 1976 where he eventually joined the Myanmar Army. In 2002, Khin Yi was appointed Chief of the Myanmar Police. During this time, he ordered the crackdown on the Saffron Revolution in 2007.

In 2011, Khin Yi was appointed Minister of Immigration and Population in the quasi-civilian government of President Thein Sein, serving in this role until 2015. In 2019, Khin Yi was appointed Deputy Chairman of the USDP by Chairman Than Htay. Following the 2021 coup, Khin Yi was once again appointed as Minister of Immigration and Population in the military government of Min Aung Hlaing, serving in the role until 2022. Later that year, Than Htay resigned as Chairman of the USDP and Khin Yi officially succeeded him.

Khin Yi led the USDP into the controversial and widely criticised 2025–26 general elections where the party won landslides.

== Early life and education ==
Khin Yi was born on 29 December 1952 at Myaungmya Township. He graduated from the 17th intake in the Defence Services Academy.

== Career ==
He ordered the bloody crackdown on protesters at the Saffron Revolution, later became Immigration Minister in Thein Sein's quasi-civilian government and again in the military junta Min Aung Hlaing's cabinet.

Khin served as Minister of Immigration and Population from March 2011 to August 2015 and again from August 2021 to August 2022 as well as Chief of the Myanmar Police Force from April 2002 to March 2011.

He was appointed to lead the USDP in acting capacity from September to October 2022 and official capacity since October 2022 as well as Vice Chairman of the party from December 2019 to his official promotion to the party chairmanship in October 2022.

The Union Election Commission announced on January 2, 2026, that Khin Yi was elected to the Pyithu Hluttaw as the representative from Zeyathiri Township in the Naypyidaw Union Territory in the 2025–26 Myanmar general election, considered a sham process by independent observers.
