= Ministry of Defence (Myanmar) =

Government ministry of Myanmar

- ကာကွယ်ရေး၀န်ကြီးဌာန; Kakweye Wungyi Htana
- Seal of the Ministry

- Flag of the Ministry

Ministry overview
- Type: Ministry
- Jurisdiction: Government of Myanmar
- Headquarters: Naypyidaw, Myanmar
- Annual budget: US$2.289 billion (2013)
- Minister responsible: General Htun Aung, Union Minister
- Child agencies: Myanmar Economic Corporation; Union of Myanmar Economic Holdings
- Website: www.mod.gov.mm

The Ministry of Defence (Burmese: ကာကွယ်ရေးဝန်ကြီးဌာန; abbreviated MoD) is a government ministry in Myanmar (Burma), responsible for the country's national security and the armed forces (the Tatmadaw). The ministry has the largest share of the national budget among all government ministries, with a budget of $2.289 billion USD in 2013. As part of the Burma Sanctions Program, the United States government prohibits its citizens from doing business with the Ministry of Defence of Myanmar or its affiliates.

== Departments ==
- Union Minister Office
- Department of International and Internal Affairs
- Account Office
- Directorate of Procurement

The Ministry of Defence also generates significant revenue from business interests, by owning and operating a large business conglomerate, the Myanmar Economic Corporation (MEC). MEC is owned by the Tatmadaw's Quartermaster General’s Office, and is a direct source of revenue for the Burmese military, even though earnings from MEC are not declared in the ministry's budget.

== List of ministers ==
No.	Portrait	Name (lifespan)	Term of office			Political party	Cabinet	Ref.
No.	Portrait	Name (lifespan)	Took office	Left office	Time in office	Political party	Cabinet	Ref.
Counsellor at Defence Department
1		Aung San (1915–1947)	28 September 1946	19 July 1947 †	294 days	Anti-Fascist People's Freedom League		
2		Bo Let Ya (1911–1978)	1 August 1947	8 May 1948	281 days	Anti-Fascist People's Freedom League		
Minister for Defence for Administering the War Office
(2)		Bo Let Ya (1911–1978)	8 May 1948	13 September 1948	128 days	Anti-Fascist People's Freedom League		
3		U Nu (1907–1995)	14 September 1948	3 April 1949	201 days	Anti-Fascist People's Freedom League		
4		Major General; Ne Win (1911–2002)	4 April 1949	9 September 1950	1 year, 158 days			
5		U Win (1905–1969)	18 September 1950	15 March 1952	1 year, 179 days			
6		U Ba Swe (1915–1987)	16 March 1952	1 January 1956	3 years, 291 days	Anti-Fascist People's Freedom League		
Minister for Defence
(6)		U Ba Swe (1915–1987)	1 January 1956	4 June 1958	2 years, 154 days	Anti-Fascist People's Freedom League		
7		Bo Hmu Aung (1910–2004)	9 June 1958	28 September 1958	111 days			
(4)		General; Ne Win (1911–2002)	29 September 1958	15 March 1960	1 year, 168 days			
(3)		U Nu (1907–1995)	16 March 1960	2 March 1962	1 year, 351 days	Union Party		
Commissar for Defence
(4)		General; Ne Win (1911–2002)	2 March 1962	20 April 1972	10 years, 49 days	Burma Socialist Programme Party		
Minister for Defence
8		General; San Yu (1918–1996)	21 April 1972	7 March 1974	1 year, 320 days	Burma Socialist Programme Party		
9		General; Tin Oo (1927–2024)	8 March 1974	6 March 1976	1 year, 364 days	Burma Socialist Programme Party		
10		General; Kyaw Htin (1925–1996)	7 March 1976	27 July 1988	12 years, 142 days	Burma Socialist Programme Party		
11		Senior General; Saw Maung (1928–1997)	28 July 1988	19 March 1992	3 years, 235 days	Military	State Peace and Development Council	
12		Senior General; Than Shwe (born 1933)	20 March 1992	29 March 2011	19 years, 9 days	Union Solidarity and Development Association	State Peace and Development Council	
Union Minister for Defence
13		Lieutenant General Hla Min (born 1958)	30 March 2011	7 September 2012	1 year, 161 days	Military	Thein Sein	
14		Lieutenant General Wai Lwin (born 1954)	8 September 2012	12 August 2015	2 years, 338 days	Military	Thein Sein	
15		Lieutenant General Sein Win (born 1956)	25 August 2015	1 February 2021	5 years, 160 days	Military	Thein Sein; Htin Kyaw; Win Myint	
16		General Mya Tun Oo (born 1961)	2 February 2021	2 August 2023	2 years, 181 days	Military	Min Aung Hlaing	
17		Admiral Tin Aung San (born 1960)	2 August 2023	17 December 2024	1 year, 137 days	Military	Min Aung Hlaing	
18		General Maung Maung Aye (born 1962)	18 December 2024	10 April 2026	1 year, 113 days	Military	Min Aung Hlaing Nyo Saw	
19		General Htun Aung (born 1967)	11 April 2026	Incumbent	119 days	Military	Min Aung Hlaing	
