= Myanmar coup d'état =

Myanmar coup d'état may refer to the:

- 1962 Burmese coup d'état
- 1988 Burmese coup d'état
- 2021 Myanmar coup d'état
