= Aung Naing Oo =

Burmese politician

- အောင်နိုင်ဦး

Minister of Commerce
- In office 19 August 2022 – 27 May 2024
- Preceded by: Pwint San

Minister for Investment and Foreign Economic Relations
- In office 1 February 2021 – 19 August 2022
- President: Myint Swe (acting)
- Leader: Min Aung Hlaing
- Preceded by: Thaung Tun
- Succeeded by: Kan Zaw

Personal details
- Born: 13 October 1962 (age 63) Kyaukse, Burma or Khamti, Burma
- Citizenship: Burmese
- Cabinet: Min Aung Hlaing's military cabinet

Military service
- Allegiance: Myanmar
- Years of service: 1981-2000

Aung Naing Oo (Burmese: အောင်နိုင်ဦး; born 13 October 1962 in Kyauksein Khamti) is the current Union Minister of Commerce of Myanmar. He also served as Union Minister of Investment and Foreign Economic Relations from the Myanmar military coup on 1 February 2021 to 19 August 2022. He is a former military officer, and transitioned into the civil service in 2000, serving in key trade and commerce posts.

== Career ==
Aung Naing Oo has a Bachelor of Arts degree. He served in the Myanmar Armed Forces from 1981 to 2000. He transitioned into Myanmar's Ministry of Commerce, serving as a deputy general manager of Myanmar Agricultural Produce Trading between 2000 and 2005. He served as a deputy director general at several agencies within the Ministry, including the Minister's Office from 2006 to 2010, the Department of Border Trade between 2010 and 2011, and the Directorate of Investment and Company Administration (DICA) from May 2011 to 2012.

Between 2012 and 2019, he was promoted as DICA's director-general. He transferred to the Office of Union Investment and Foreign Economic Relations as its director-general on 29 March 2019. He was concurrently appointed as the permanent secretary of the Ministry in April 2019.

In the aftermath of the military-led 2021 Myanmar coup d'état, the Myanmar Armed Forces appointed Aung Naing Oo as the Minister for Investment and Foreign Economic Relations on 1 February 2021. On 19 August 2022, he was moved to Ministry of Commerce.

Under SAC Order 38/2024, Aung Naing Oo was permitted to resign from his position as Union Minister of the State Administration Council Chairman's Office Ministry 3 on 27 May 2024.

== Personal life ==
Aung Naing Oo is married and has two daughters, including Zezawar “Rachel” Aung Naing Oo.

== See also ==
- Cabinet of Myanmar
