= Ministry of Investment and Foreign Economic Relations =

Government ministry of Myanmar

- ရင်းနှီးမြှပ်နှံမှုနှင့် နိုင်ငံခြားစီးပွားဆက်သွယ်ရေးဝန်ကြီးဌာန

Agency overview
- Formed: 19 November 2018
- Preceding agency: Ministry of Planning and Finance's Foreign Economic Relations Department and Directorate of Investment and Company Administration
- Dissolved: 10 April 2026
- Superseding agency: Ministry of National Planning, Investment and Foreign Economic Relations
- Jurisdiction: Government of Myanmar
- Website: www.mifer.gov.mm

The Ministry of Investment and Foreign Economic Relations (Burmese: ရင်းနှီးမြှပ်နှံမှုနှင့် နိုင်ငံခြားစီးပွားဆက်သွယ်ရေးဝန်ကြီးဌာန; abbreviated MIFER) was a ministry of the Government of Myanmar. It was created by President U Win Myint. The Ministry of Investment and Foreign Economic Relations has been merged into the Ministry of National Planning, Investment and Foreign Economic Relations. The Myanmar Armed Forces appointed Aung Naing Oo as the Minister for Investment and Foreign Economic Relations on 1 February 2021, the same day as the Myanmar military staged a coup in the country.

== History ==
During the 2018 ASEAN summit, State Counsellor Aung San Suu Kyi called on businesses to invest in Myanmar. She delivered a keynote speech, inviting foreign entities to invest in the country’s priority sectors (including agriculture, food processing, fisheries, export promotion, import substitution, energy, logistics, education, healthcare and construction), saying that investing in Myanmar will bring good returns to both investors and the nation.

Htun Htun Oo, Union Attorney General, made a proposal to the Pyidaungsu Hluttaw for the formation of a new ministry on 12 November 2018. As there was no disagreement, Pyidaungsu Hluttaw Speaker announced the establishment of the new ministry. It was formed by combining the Foreign Economic Relations Department, Directorate of Investment and Company Administration of the Ministry of Planning and Finance.

Due to the ministry's creation, the number of ministries in the cabinet rose to 25.

== List of Union Ministers ==
No.	Portrait	Name	Term			President
No.	Portrait	Name	Took office	Left office	Days	President
1		Thaung Tun	19 November 2018	1 February 2021	2 years, 74 days	Win Myint
1		Thaung Tun	Formerly the union minister for the Ministry of the Office of the Union Government, Thaung Tun was appointed as the newly created ministry's Union Minister by president Win Myint.			
2		Aung Naing Oo	1 February 2021	19 August 2022	1 year, 199 days	Myint Swe
2		Aung Naing Oo	A former military officer and civil servant			
3		Dr Kan Zaw	19 August 2022	31 July 2025	2 years, 346 days	Myint Swe (Acting) Min Aung Hlaing (Acting)
4		Dr Wa Wa Maung	31 July 2025	10 April 2026	253 days	Min Aung Hlaing (Acting)
