= Ministry of Construction (Myanmar) =

Government ministry of Myanmar

- ဆောက်လုပ်ရေး ဝန်ကြီးဌာန
- Seal of the Ministry of Construction

Agency overview
- Formed: 1951; 75 years ago
- Superseding agency: Building Department Road Management Department Bridge Management Department State East Department Village Development Department
- Jurisdiction: Government of Myanmar
- Headquarters: Naypyidaw; 19.807709°N 96.128324°E
- Minister responsible: Shwe Lay
- Website: www.construction.gov.mm

The Ministry of Construction (Burmese: ဆောက်လုပ်ရေး ဝန်ကြီးဌာန) is a ministry in the Government of Myanmar responsible for the country's construction and maintenance of infrastructure, including roads and bridges.

== Departments ==
As of 2019, the Ministry of Construction oversees the following departments:

- Minister's Office
- Department of Building
- Department of Highways
- Department of Bridge
- Department of Urban and Housing Development
- Department of Rural Road Development
