= Tin Aung San =

Burmese admiral (born 1960)

His Excellency Admiral (Rtd) Tin Aung San
- တင်အောင်စန်း
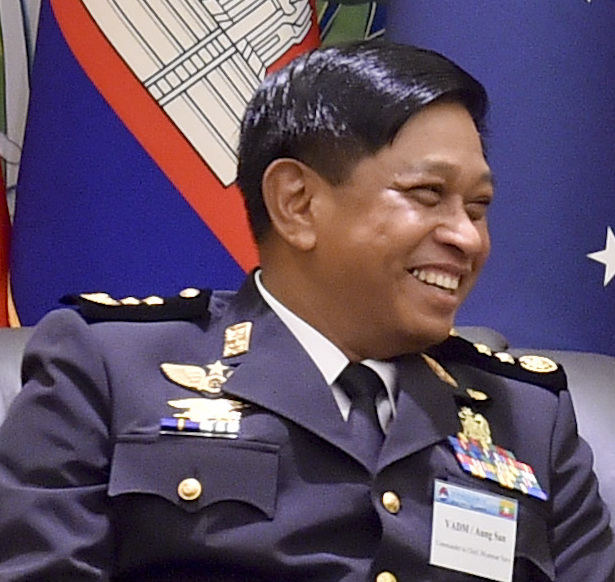
- Tin Aung San in 2015

Union Minister of the President's Office
- Incumbent
- Assumed office 10 April 2026
- Appointed by: Min Aung Hlaing
- President: Min Aung Hlaing
- Deputy: Htin Kyaw Thu
- Preceded by: Himself (as Union Minister of Ministry 1 of the President's Office)

Member of the Pyithu Hluttaw for Ottarathiri, Naypyidaw
- In office 16 March 2026 – 10 April 2026
- Preceded by: Kyaw Min Hlaing (NLD)
- Succeeded by: Vacant

National Security Advisor
- In office 31 July 2025 – 10 April 2026
- Appointed by: National Defence and Security Council
- Preceded by: Moe Aung
- Succeeded by: Vacant

Union Minister of Ministry 1 of the President's Office
- In office 31 July 2025 – 10 April 2026
- Appointed by: National Defence and Security Council
- President: Min Aung Hlaing (acting)
- Prime Minister: Nyo Saw
- Preceded by: Aung San Suu Kyi
- Succeeded by: Himself (as Union Minister of the President's Office)

Union Minister of the Office of the Prime Minister
- In office 18 December 2024 – 31 July 2025
- Appointed by: State Administration Council
- President: Min Aung Hlaing (acting)
- Prime Minister: Min Aung Hlaing
- Preceded by: Office Established
- Succeeded by: Office Dissolved

Minister for Defence
- In office 3 August 2023 – 18 December 2024
- Appointed by: State Administration Council
- President: Myint Swe (acting); Min Aung Hlaing (acting)
- Prime Minister: Min Aung Hlaing
- Preceded by: Mya Tun Oo
- Succeeded by: Maung Maung Aye

Deputy Prime Minister of Myanmar
- In office 1 February 2023 – 31 July 2025 Serving with Soe Win, Mya Tun Oo, Win Shein, and Than Swe
- Appointed by: State Administration Council
- President: Myint Swe (acting)
- Prime Minister: Min Aung Hlaing

Union Minister for Transport and Communications
- In office 3 February 2021 – 3 August 2023
- Appointed by: State Administration Council
- President: Myint Swe (acting)
- Prime Minister: Min Aung Hlaing
- Preceded by: Thant Sin Maung
- Succeeded by: Mya Tun Oo

Member of the State Administration Council
- In office 2 February 2021 – 31 July 2025
- Appointed by: Commander-in-Chief of Defence Services
- Preceded by: Council Established
- Succeeded by: Council Dissolved

Commander-in-Chief (Navy)
- In office 11 August 2015 – 3 February 2021
- Leader: Min Aung Hlaing
- Preceded by: Thura Thet Swe
- Succeeded by: Moe Aung

Personal details
- Born: 16 October 1960 (age 65) Union of Burma (now Myanmar)
- Party: Union Solidarity and Development
- Spouse: Than Than Aye
- Children: 1
- Education: Defence Services Academy

Military service
- Allegiance: Myanmar
- Branch/service: Myanmar Navy
- Years of service: 1982–2025
- Rank: Admiral

Tin Aung San (Burmese: တင်အောင်စန်း; pronounced [tɪ̀ɰ̃ àʊ̃ sʰáɴ]; born 16 October 1960) is a Burmese politician and former Myanmar Navy officer who is serving as Union Minister of the President's Office since April 2026.

He held the position of Union Minister of Ministry 1 of the President's Office and served as the national security advisor to the National Defence and Security Council. He was also elected to the Pyithu Hluttaw during the 2025–26 general election. Prior to these roles, he had served as Deputy Prime Minister of Myanmar, as a member of the State Administration Council, and as the minister for defence.

== Career ==
Tin Aung San graduated from the Defence Services Academy in 1982 as part of the 23rd intake. Tin Aung San was promoted as Commander-in-Chief of the Myanmar Navy in August 2015, succeeding Admiral Thura Thet Swe, who retired to run for political office.

After the 2021 Myanmar coup d'état, Tin Aung San was appointed a member of the State Administration Council (SAC) on 2 February 2021. He subsequently relinquished his position as the Commander-in-Chief of the Myanmar Navy, with Admiral Moe Aung assuming the role.

On the following day (3 February 2021), he was appointed the Minister of Transport and Communications by the SAC. In this regard, the Committee Representing Pyidaungsu Hluttaw (CRPH) claims that the military regime’s cabinet is illegitimate.

Following a cabinet reshuffle in 1 February 2023, he was appointed Deputy Prime Minister, along with Soe Win, Mya Tun Oo, Soe Htut, Win Shein and Than Swe, concurrently as Minister for Transport and Communications.

Following the dissolution of State Administration Council on 31 July 2025, he is part of the new cabinet under Nyo Saw as Union Minister of Ministry 1 of the President's Office.

On 5 August 2025, the National Defence and Security Council appointed Tin Aung San as National Security Advisor. He served in this post concurrently with the post of Union Minister 1 of the President's Office.

Tin Aung San ran and was elected as the Union Solidarity and Development Party candidate for Pyithu Hluttaw in Ottarathiri Township, Naypyidaw Union Territory, in the 2025–26 Myanmar general election, considered a sham process by independent observers.

He joined second Min Aung Hlaing cabinet as Union Minister of the President's Office since 10 April 2026.

== Sanctions ==
The U.S. Department of the Treasury has imposed sanctions on Tin Aung San since 11 February 2021, pursuant to Executive Order 14014, in response to the Myanmar's military’s coup against the democratically elected civilian government of Myanmar (Burma). The US sanctions include freezing of assets under the US and ban on transactions with US person.

The Government of Canada has imposed sanctions on Tin Aung San since 18 February 2021, pursuant to Special Economic Measures Act and Special Economic Measures (Burma) Regulations, in response to the gravity of the human rights and humanitarian situation in Myanmar (formerly Burma). The Canadian sanctions include freezing of assets under Canada and ban on transactions with Canadian person.

Furthermore, the British Government placed sanctions on Tin Aung San on 25 February 2021, following the recent military coup. The UK sanctions include freezing of assets under the UK and ban on traveling or transiting to the United Kingdom.

== Personal life ==
Tin Aung San is married to Tin Tin Aye, and has one daughter, Yin Min Thu (b. 1989).

== See also ==
- State Administration Council
- Myanmar Army
- Myanmar Navy
- Tatmadaw
- Defence Services Academy
