= Ministry of Hotels and Tourism (Myanmar) =

Government ministry of Myanmar

- ဟိုတယ်နှင့် ခရီးသွားလာရေး ဝန်ကြီးဌာန
- Seal of the Ministry of Hotels and Tourism

Agency overview
- Formed: 24 September 1992
- Jurisdiction: Government of Myanmar
- Headquarters: Office No (33), Naypyidaw; 19.808405°N 96.141266°E
- Minister responsible: Kyaw Soe Win
- Deputy Minister responsible: Phyo Zaw Soe
- Website: tourism.gov.mm

The Ministry of Hotels and Tourism (Burmese: ဟိုတယ်နှင့် ခရီးသွားလာရေးဝန်ကြီးဌာန) was a ministry in the Burmese government responsible for the country's tourism sector.
