= Ministry of Labour (Myanmar) =

Government ministry of Myanmar

- အလုပ်သမားဝန်ကြီးဌာန

Agency overview
- Jurisdiction: Government of Myanmar
- Headquarters: Office No (51), Naypyidaw; 19.838351°N 96.1203718°E
- Minister responsible: Myint Naung
- Website: https://www.mol.gov.mm/en/

The Ministry of Labour (Burmese: အလုပ်သမား ဝန်ကြီးဌာန) is a ministry of Government of Myanmar, responsible for the country's labour welfare and renders services to employers and workers. President Htin Kyaw combined Ministry of Labour, Employment and Social Security and Ministry of Immigration and Population to form the Ministry of Labour, Immigration and Population. However, after the 2021 coup, it was split into the Ministry of Labour and Ministry of Immigration and Population.

== History ==
The ministry's names, functions and responsibilities have changed several times:

Ministry name	Abbreviation	Start	End	Reference
Ministry of Labour, Employment and Social Security	MOLES		2016	
Ministry of Labour, Immigration and Population	MOLIP	2016	2021	
Ministry of Labour	MOL	2021	present	

== Departmental bodies ==
1. Department of Labour
2. Social Security Board
3. Factories and General Labour Laws Inspection Department
4. Department of Labour Relations
