= Cabinet of Win Myint =

Administration held by Burmese president Win Myint

U Win Myint cabinet
- 3rd Union Government of Myanmar

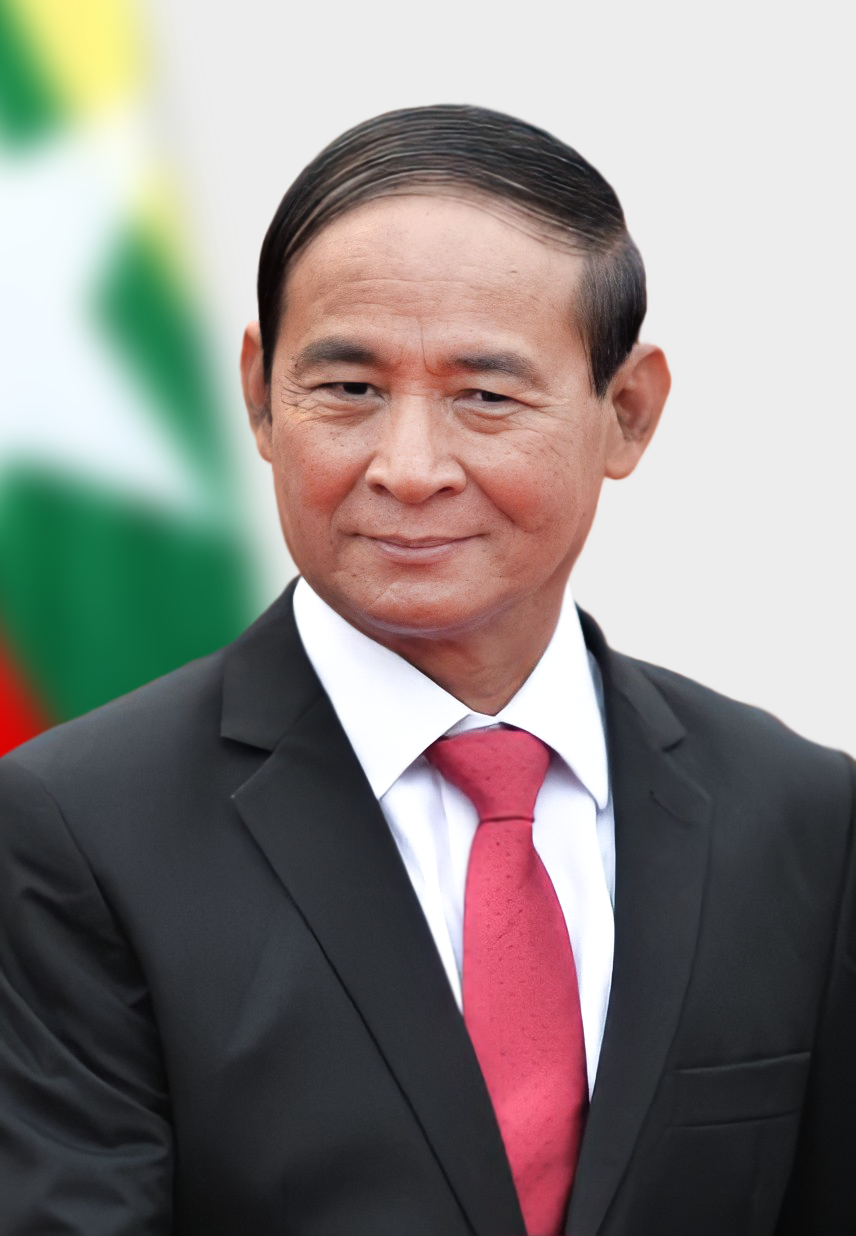
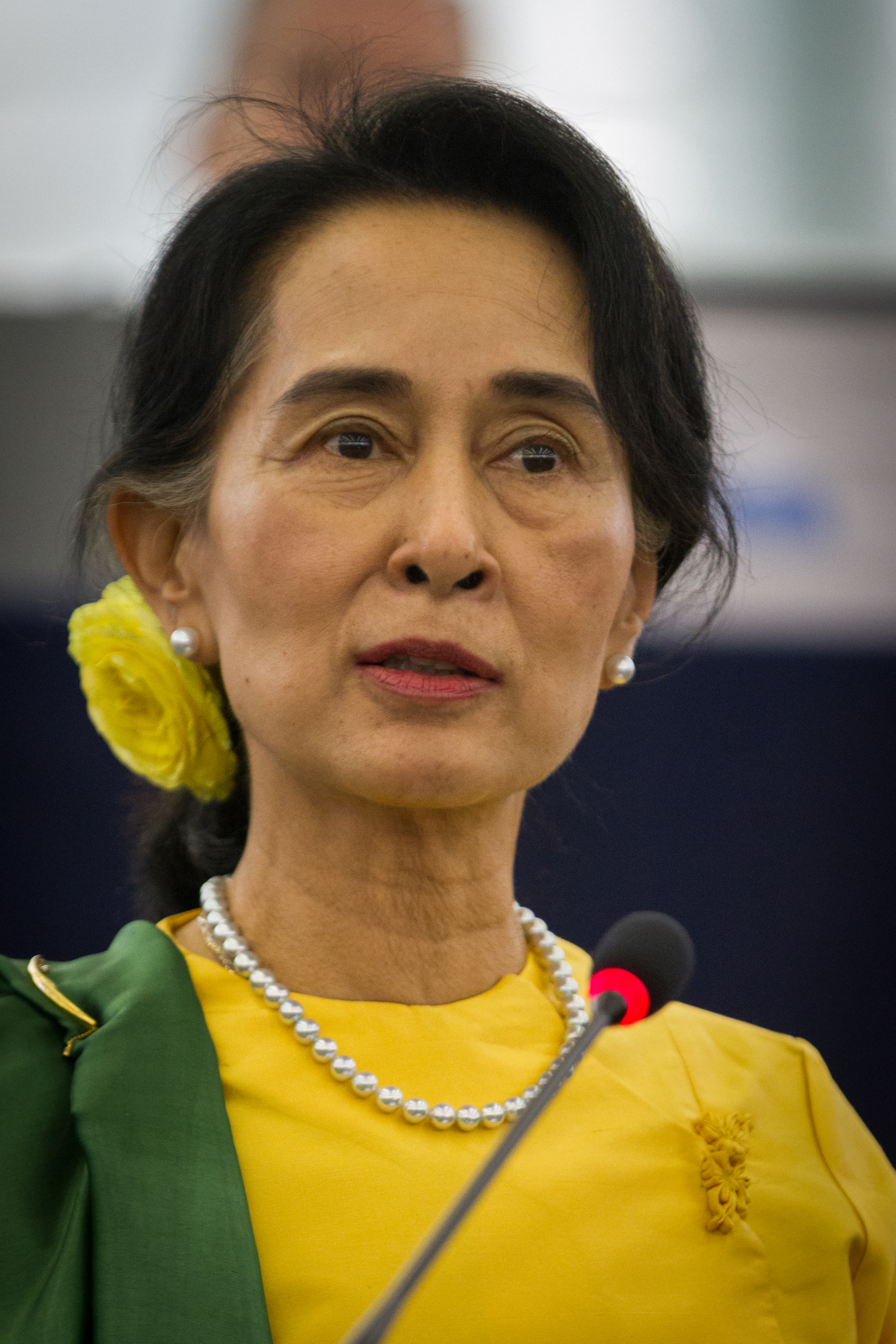
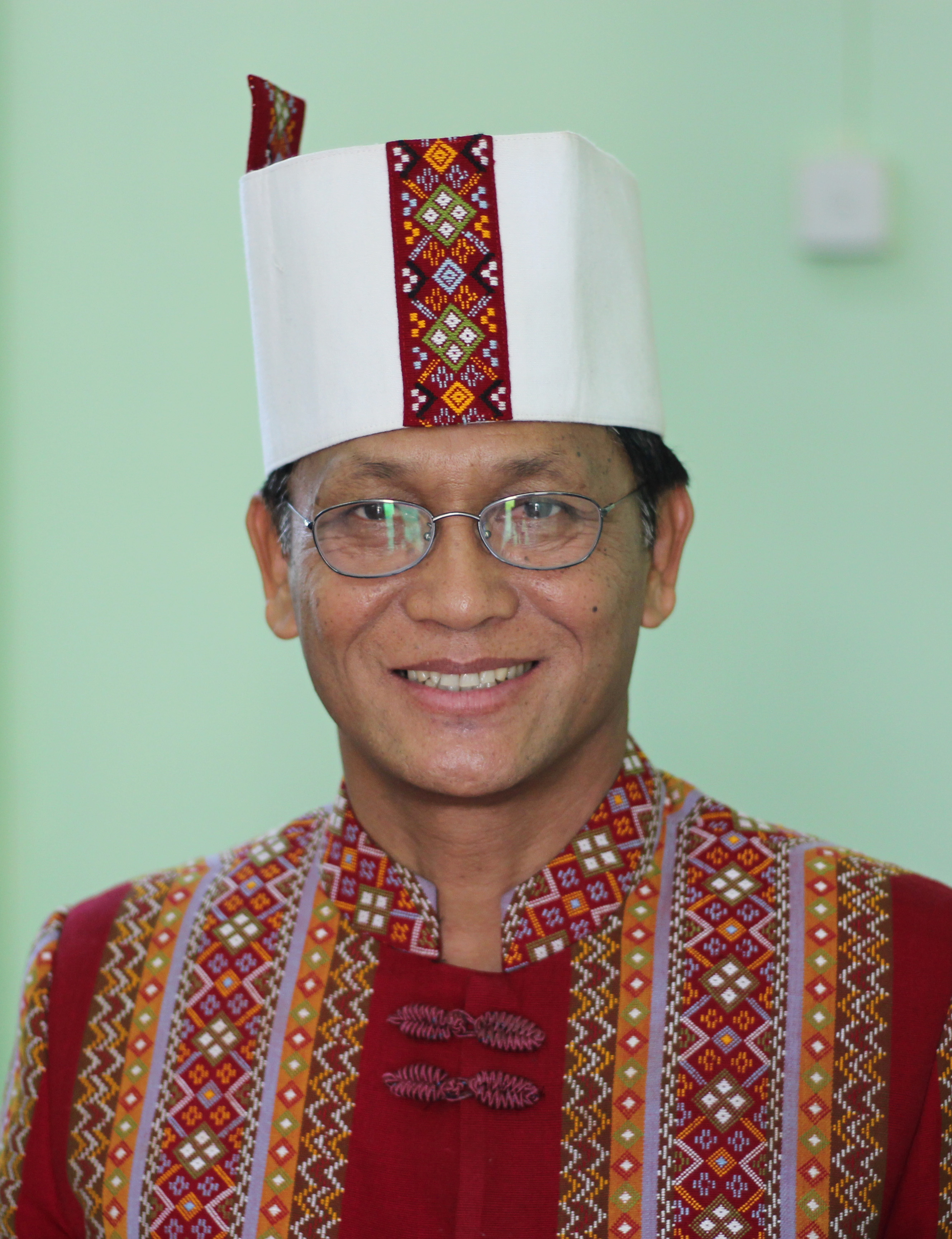
- The Head and the Deputy Heads of the Government
- Date formed: 30 March 2018
- Date dissolved: 1 February 2021

People and organisations
- Head of state: Win Myint
- Head of government: Win Myint
- Deputy head of government: Aung San Suu Kyi (State Counsellor); Myint Swe (1st Vice President); Henry Van Thio (2nd Vice President)
- No. of ministers: 25
- Member party: NLD
- Opposition party: USDP

History
- Outgoing formation: 2021 Myanmar coup d'état
- Predecessor: Cabinet of Htin Kyaw
- Successor: Military cabinet of Min Aung Hlaing

The cabinet of U Win Myint (Burmese: ဦးဝင်းမြင့်အစိုးရ) (officially Union Government of the Republic of the Union of Myanmar), co-headed by President Win Myint and State Counsellor Aung San Suu Kyi, was the executive body of Myanmar from 30 March 2018 to 1 February 2021. It took office on 30 March 2018, following the resignation of former president Htin Kyaw and the subsequent election. Following the 2021 Myanmar coup d'état, the cabinet was removed and replaced by a military government.

== Heads and deputy heads ==
Win Myint	President
Aung San Suu Kyi	State Counsellor
Myint Swe	Vice President 1
Henry Van Thio	Vice President 2

== Cabinet ==
Cabinet
Portfolio	Minister	Took office	Left office	Party
Minister of Agriculture, Livestock and Irrigation	Aung Thu	30 March 2018	1 February 2021	NLD
Deputy Minister of Agriculture, Livestock and Irrigation	Hla Kyaw	30 March 2018	1 February 2021	USDP
Minister of Border Affairs	Ye Aung, Lt. Gen.	30 March 2018	1 February 2021	Tatmadaw
Deputy Minister of Border Affairs	Than Htut, Maj. Gen.	30 March 2018	1 February 2021	Tatmadaw
Minister of Commerce	Than Myint	30 March 2018	1 February 2021	NLD
Deputy Minister of Commerce	Aung Htoo	30 March 2018	1 February 2021	Independent
Minister of Construction	Han Zaw	30 March 2018	1 February 2021	Independent
Deputy Minister of Construction	Kyaw Linn	30 March 2018	1 February 2021	Independent
Minister of Defence	Sein Win, Lt. Gen.	30 March 2018	1 February 2021	Tatmadaw
Deputy Minister of Defence	Myint Nwe, Rear Admiral	30 March 2018	1 February 2021	Tatmadaw
Minister of Education	Myo Thein Gyi	6 April 2016	1 February 2021	Independent
Deputy Minister of Education	Win Maw Tun	30 March 2018	1 February 2021	Independent
Minister of Electricity and Energy	Win Khaing	30 March 2018	1 February 2021	Independent
Deputy Minister of Electricity and Energy	Tun Naing, Dr.	30 March 2018	1 February 2021	NLD
Deputy Minister of Electricity and Energy	Khin Maung Win	31 October 2019	1 February 2021	
Minister of Ethnic Affairs	Naing Thet Lwin	30 March 2018	1 February 2021	MNP
Deputy Minister of Ethnic Affairs	Hla Maw Oo	15 October 2018	1 February 2021	
Minister of Finance and Planning	Kyaw Win	30 March 2018	25 May 2018	NLD
Minister of Finance and Planning	Soe Win	31 May 2018	1 February 2021	Independent
Deputy Minister of Finance and Planning	Maung Maung Win	30 March 2018	1 February 2021	NLD
Deputy Minister of Finance and Planning	Set Aung	30 March 2018	1 February 2021	Independent
Minister of Foreign Affairs	Aung San Suu Kyi	30 March 2018	1 February 2021	NLD
Minister of Health and Sports	Myint Htwe	30 March 2018	1 February 2021	Independent
Deputy Minister of Health and Sports	Mya Lay Sein	2 July 2018	1 February 2021	Independent
Minister of Home Affairs	Kyaw Swe, Lt. Gen.	30 March 2018	4 February 2020	Tatmadaw
Minister of Home Affairs	Soe Htut, Lt. Gen.	10 February 2020	Incumbent	Tatmadaw
Deputy Minister of Home Affairs	Aung Thu, Maj. Gen	28 May 2018	1 February 2021	Tatmadaw
Minister of Hotels and Tourism	Ohn Maung	30 March 2018	1 February 2021	Independent
Deputy Minister of Hotels and Tourism	Tin Latt	31 October 2019	1 February 2021	
Minister of Industry	Khin Maung Cho	30 March 2018	1 February 2021	Independent
Minister of Information	Pe Myint, Dr.	30 March 2018	1 February 2021	Independent
Deputy Minister of Information	Aung Hla Tun	30 March 2018	1 February 2021	Independent
Minister of International Cooperation	Kyaw Tin	30 March 2018	1 February 2021	NLD
Deputy Minister of International Cooperation	Hau Do Suan	1 December 2020	1 February 2021	Independent
Minister of Labour, Immigration and Population	Thein Swe	30 March 2018	1 February 2021	USDP
Minister of Natural Resources and Environmental Conservation	Ohn Win	30 March 2018	1 February 2021	Independent
Deputy Minister of Natural Resources and Environmental Conservation	Ye Myint Swe, Dr	15 October 2018	1 February 2021	
Minister of the Office of the Union Government	Thaung Tun	24 November 2017	19 November 2018	Independent
Minister of the Office of the Union Government	Min Thu	29 November 2018	1 February 2021	NLD
Deputy Minister of the office of the Union Government	Tin Myint	2 January 2019	1 February 2021	Tatmadaw
Ministry of Investment and Foreign Economic Relations	Thaung Tun	19 November 2018	1 February 2021	Independent
Minister of the President's Office	Aung San Suu Kyi	30 March 2018	1 February 2021	NLD
Deputy Minister of President's Office	Min Thu	30 March 2018	29 November 2018	NLD
Minister of Religious Affairs and Culture	Aung Ko	30 March 2018	1 February 2021	USDP
Deputy Minister of Religious Affairs and Culture	Kyi Min	15 October 2018	1 February 2021	
Minister of Social Welfare, Relief and Resettlement	Win Myat Aye, Dr.	30 March 2018	1 February 2021	NLD
Deputy Minister of Social Welfare, Relief and Resettlement	Soe Aung	30 March 2018	1 February 2021	Independent
Minister of State Counsellor’s Office	Kyaw Tint Swe	30 March 2018	1 February 2021	Independent
Deputy Minister of State Counsellor’s Office	Khin Maung Tin	30 March 2018	1 February 2021	Independent
Minister of Transport and Communications	Thant Sin Maung	30 March 2018	1 February 2021	NLD
Deputy Minister of Transport and Communications	Kyaw Myo	30 March 2018	1 February 2021	NLD
Deputy Minister of Transport and Communications	Thar Oo	30 March 2018	1 February 2021	Independent
Union Auditor General	Maw Than	30 March 2018	1 February 2021	Independent
Union Attorney-General	Htun Htun Oo	30 March 2018	1 February 2021	Independent
