= Cabinet of Htin Kyaw =

Government of Myanmar (2016–2018)

U Htin Kyaw cabinet
- 2nd Union Government of Myanmar

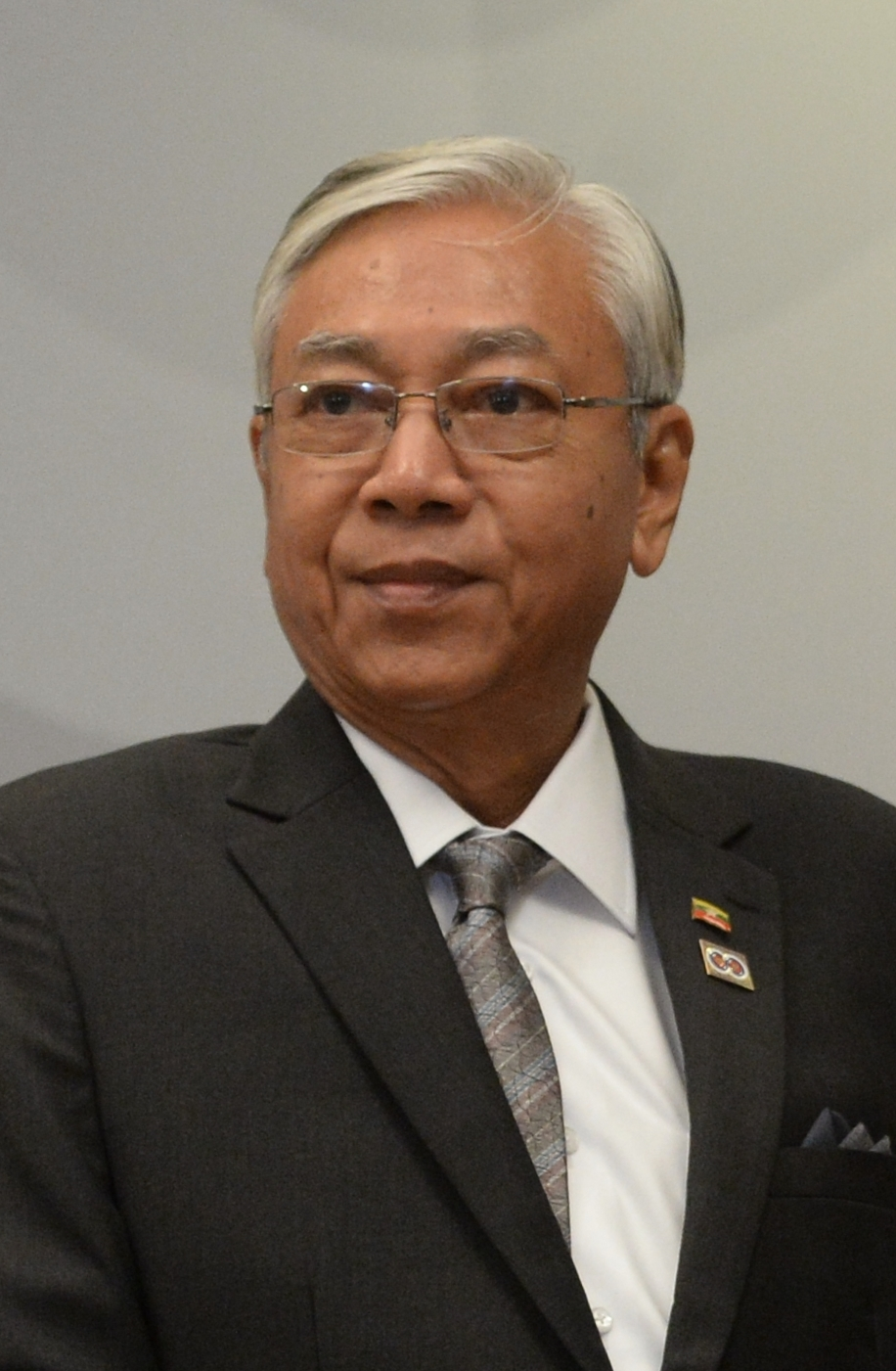
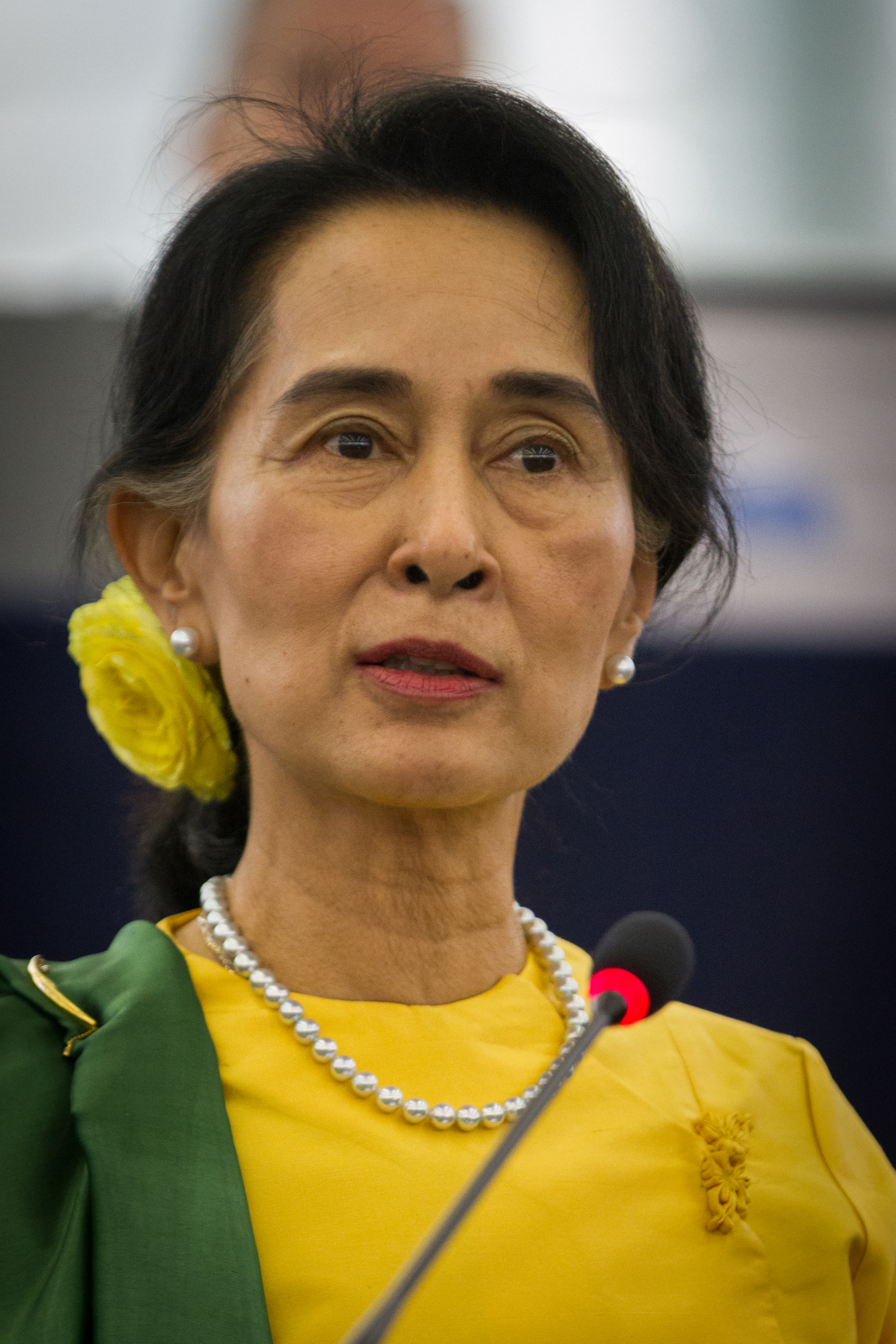
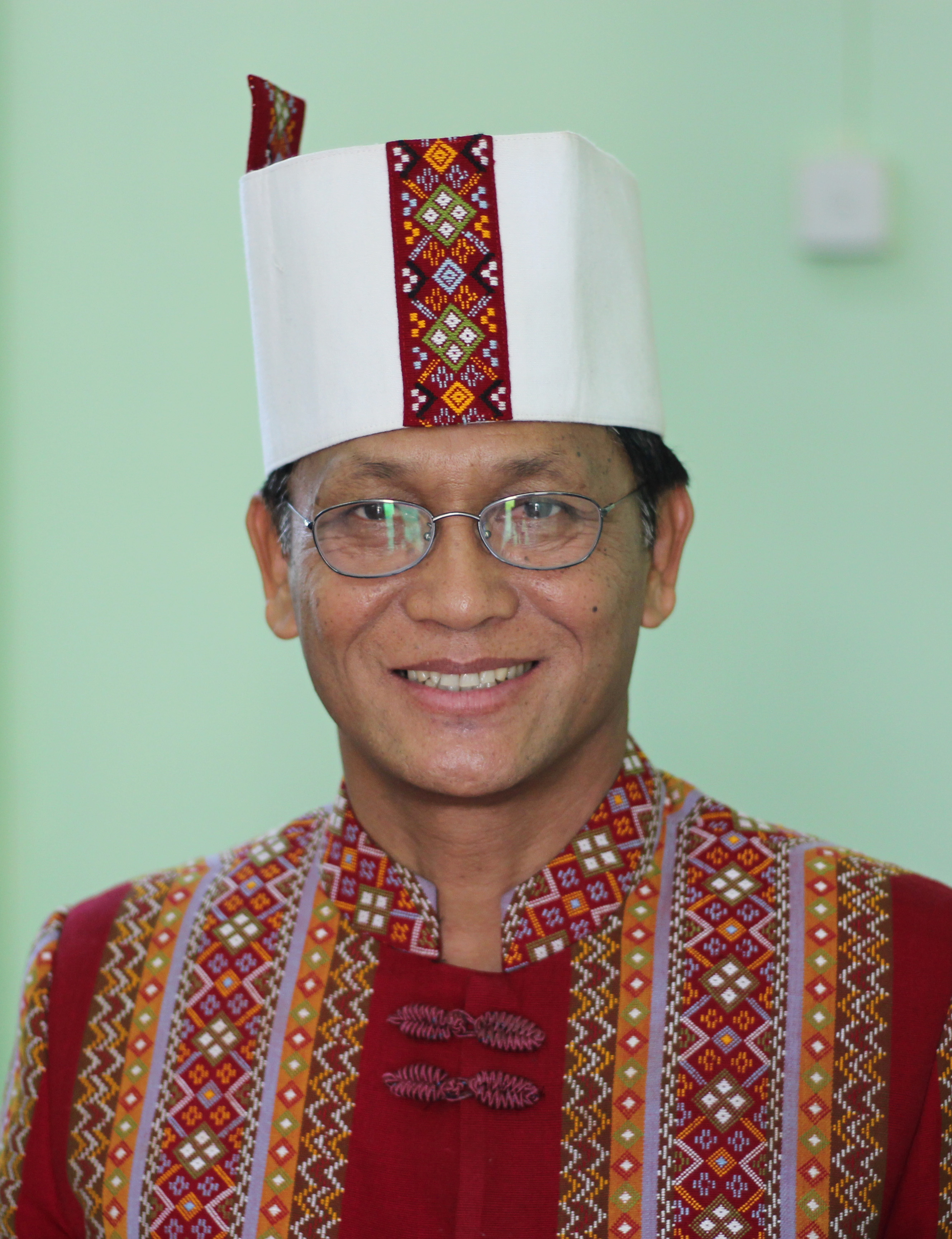
- The head and the deputy heads of the government
- Date formed: 30 March 2016
- Date dissolved: 30 March 2018

People and organisations
- Head of state: Htin Kyaw (2016–2018); Myint Swe (2018)
- Head of government: Htin Kyaw (2016–2018); Myint Swe (2018)
- Deputy head of government: Aung San Suu Kyi (State Counsellor); Myint Swe (Vice President); Henry Van Thio (Vice President)
- No. of ministers: 24
- Member party: NLD-Military
- Opposition party: USDP

History
- Election: 2015 Myanmar general election
- Predecessor: Cabinet of Thein Sein
- Successor: Cabinet of Win Myint

The cabinet of U Htin Kyaw (Burmese: ဦးထင်ကျော်အစိုးရ) (officially Union Government of the Republic of the Union of Myanmar), co-headed by President Htin Kyaw and State Counsellor Aung San Suu Kyi, is the former government of Myanmar which took office from 30 March 2016 to 30 March 2018 after the 2015 general election. This election saw the opposition National League for Democracy (NLD) win a majority in both chambers of parliament.

== Overview ==
NLD chairperson Aung San Suu Kyi had vowed to rule 'above' the President. The constitution barred her from the presidency, because her husband Michael Aris and her two children hold British nationality.

Under the constitution, three ministers – of border affairs, defence and home affairs – are appointed directly by the National Defence and Security Council. The remaining 15 ministers were appointed by Htin Kyaw and included a majority from the NLD, but also two members of the former ruling party, the Union Solidarity and Development Party (USDP) and a number of independents.

On 24 November 2017, two new ministries, Ministry of International Cooperation and Ministry of the Office of the Union Government were created.

Office	Name	Party	Term
State Counsellor	Aung San Suu Kyi	NLD	6 April 2016 – 30 March 2018
Minister of Agriculture, Livestock and Irrigation	Aung Thu	NLD	30 March 2016 – 30 March 2018
Deputy Minister of Agriculture, Livestock and Irrigation	Tun Win, Dr.	NLD	3 May – 15 December 2016
Deputy Minister of Agriculture, Livestock and Irrigation	Hla Kyaw	USDP	15 December 2016 – 30 March 2018
Minister of Border Affairs	Ye Aung, Lt. Gen.	Mil	30 March 2016 – 30 March 2018
Deputy Minister of Border Affairs	Than Htut, Maj. Gen.	Mil	3 May 2016 – 30 March 2018
Minister of Commerce	Than Myint	NLD	30 March 2016 – 30 March 2018
Deputy Minister of Commerce	Aung Htoo	Ind	20 April 2017 – 30 March 2018
Minister of Construction	Win Khaing	Ind	30 March 2016 – 15 January 2018
Minister of Construction	Han Zaw	Ind	19 January 2018 – 30 March 2018
Minister of Defence	Sein Win, Lt. Gen.	Mil	30 March 2016 – 30 March 2018
Deputy Minister of Defence	Myint Nwe, Rear. Admiral	Mil	30 March 2016 – 30 March 2018
Minister of Education	Aung San Suu Kyi	NLD	30 March – 6 April 2016
Minister of Education	Myo Thein Gyi, Dr.	Ind	6 April 2016 – 30 March 2018
Deputy Minister of Education	Win Maw Tun	Ind	13 September 2016 – 30 March 2018
Minister of Electricity and Energy	Aung San Suu Kyi	NLD	30 March – 6 April 2016
Minister of Electricity and Energy	Pe Zin Tun	Ind	6 April 2016 – 2 August 2017
Minister of Electricity and Energy	Win Khaing	Ind	2 August 2017 – 30 March 2018
Deputy Minister of Electric Power and Energy	Tun Naing, Dr.	NLD	13 September 2016 – 30 March 2018
Minister of Ethnic Affairs	Nai Thet Lwin	MNP	30 March 2016 – 30 March 2018
Minister of Finance and Planning	Kyaw Win	NLD	30 March 2016 – 30 March 2018
Deputy Minister of Finance and Planning	Maung Maung Win	NLD	3 May 2016 – 30 March 2018
Deputy Minister of Finance and Planning	Set Aung	Ind	31 July 2017 – 30 March 2018
Minister of Foreign Affairs	Aung San Suu Kyi	NLD	30 March 2016 – 30 March 2018
Deputy Minister of Foreign Affairs	Kyaw Tin	NLD	3 May 2016 – 24 November 2017
Minister of Health and Sports	Myint Htwe	Ind	30 March 2016 – 30 March 2018
Minister of Home Affairs	Kyaw Swe, Lt. Gen.	Mil	30 March 2016 – 30 March 2018
Deputy Minister of Home Affairs	Aung Soe, Maj. Gen	Mil	3 May 2016 – 30 March 2018
Minister of Hotels and Tourism	Ohn Maung	Ind	30 March 2016 – 30 March 2018
Minister of Industry	Khin Maung Cho	Ind	30 March 2016 – 30 March 2018
Minister of Information	Pe Myint, Dr.	Ind	30 March 2016 – 30 March 2018
Minister of International Cooperation	Kyaw Tin	NLD	24 November 2017 – 30 March 2018
Minister of Labour, Immigration and Population	Thein Swe	USDP	30 March 2016 – 30 March 2018
Minister of Natural Resources and Environmental Conservation	Ohn Win	Ind	30 March 2016 – 30 March 2018
Minister of the Office of the Union Government	Thaung Tun	Ind	24 November 2017 – 30 March 2018
Minister of the President's Office	Aung San Suu Kyi	NLD	30 March 2016 – 30 March 2018
Deputy Minister of President's Office	Kyaw Tin	NLD	3 May 2016 – 15 December 2016
Deputy Minister of President's Office	Min Thu	USDP	3 May 2016 – 30 March 2018
Minister of Religious Affairs and Culture	Aung Ko	USDP	30 March 2016 – 30 March 2018
Minister of Social Welfare, Relief and Resettlement	Win Myat Aye, Dr.	NLD	30 March 2016 – 30 March 2018
Minister of State Counsellor’s Office	Kyaw Tint Swe	Ind	17 May 2016 – 30 March 2018
Deputy Minister of State Counsellor’s Office	Khin Maung Tin	NLD	17 May 2016 – 30 March 2018
Minister of Transport and Communications	Thant Sin Maung	NLD	30 March 2016 – 30 March 2018
Deputy Minister of Transport and Communications	Kyaw Myo	NLD	3 May 2016 – 30 March 2018
Union Auditor General	Maw Than	Ind	6 April 2016 – 30 March 2018
Union Attorney-General	Htun Htun Oo	Ind	6 April 2016 – 30 March 2018
National Security Advisor	Thaung Tun	Ind	10 January 2017 – 24 November 2017

== State Counsellor ==
The State Counsellor post was created on 6 April 2016 to allow for a greater role for Aung San Suu Kyi within the Government of Myanmar.

The bill to create the post was passed by the upper house of the Assembly of the Union on 1 April 2016 and by the lower house on 5 April 2016, and signed by President Htin Kyaw on 6 April 2016. The roles of the State Counsellor are similar to the previous prime minister of Myanmar.

== Cabinet formation ==
The cabinet members are from NLD, USDP, Military and MNP. The chairperson of NLD hold the four major ministers in the cabinet. On 25 May 2016, Htin Kyaw announced the reconstitution of his union government by the announcement No 9/2016. Aung San Suu Kyi handed over two ministries to the ministers Pe Zin Tun and Myo Thein Gyi. A new ministry was created to serve the works of the State Counsellor.

On 18 November 2016, Deputy Minister for Agriculture, Livestock and Irrigation, Tun Win was dismissed. On 2 August 2017, Minister for Electricity and Energy, Pe Zin Tun resigned.

On 27 November 2017, the Union Assembly approved the creation of two new ministries - the Ministry of the Office of the Union Government, and the Ministry of International Cooperation, bringing the total number of ministries to 24.

== Heads and ministers ==
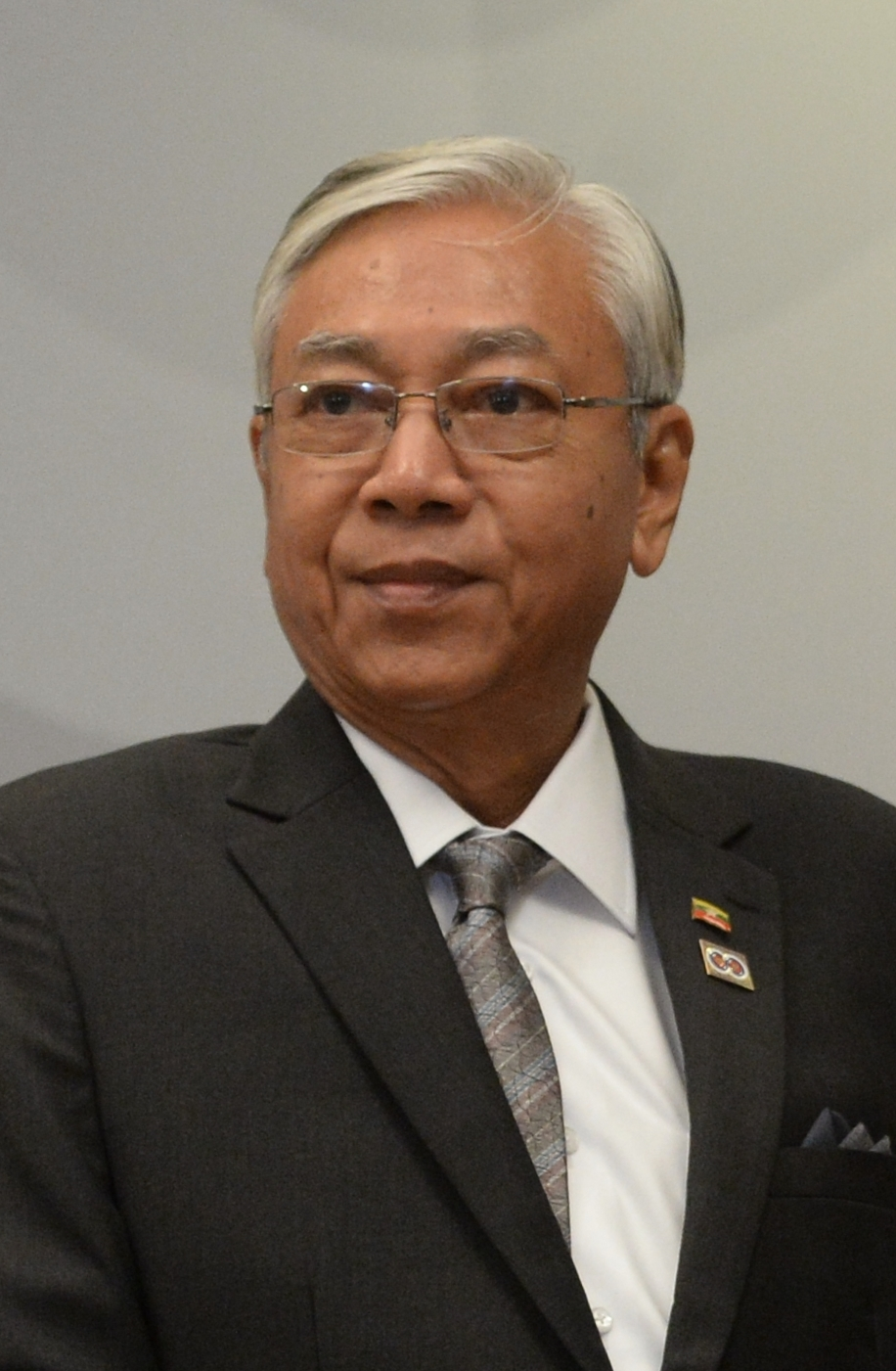
President

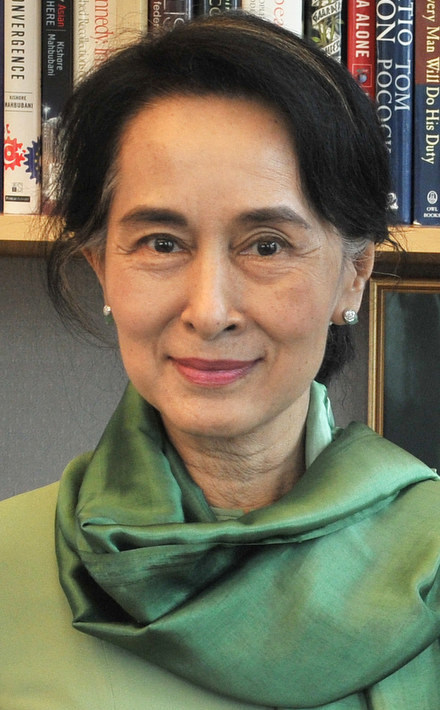
State Counsellor, Minister for Foreign Affairs and Minister for President Office

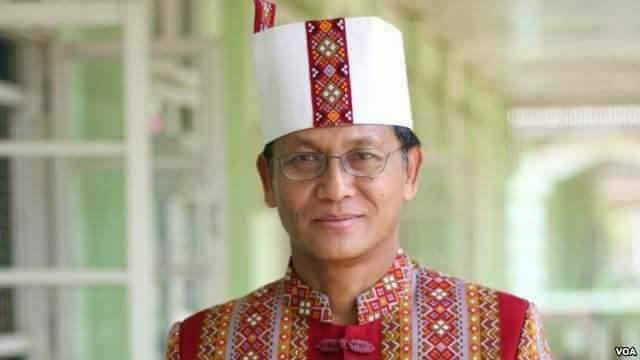
Vice President 2

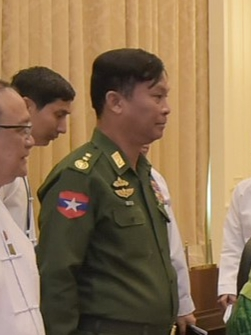
Home Affairs Minister

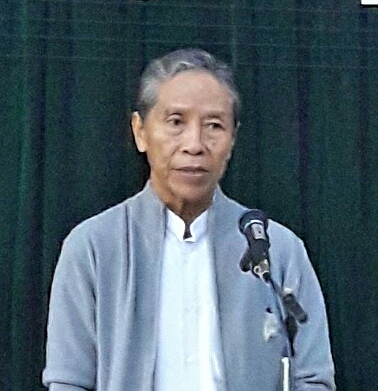
Planning and Finance Minister

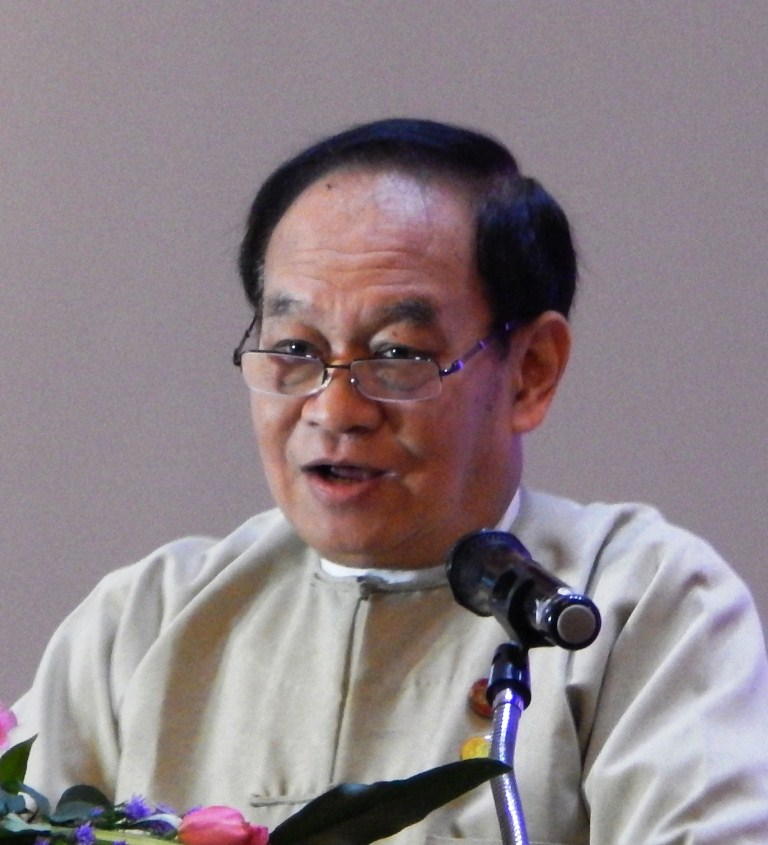
Health Minister

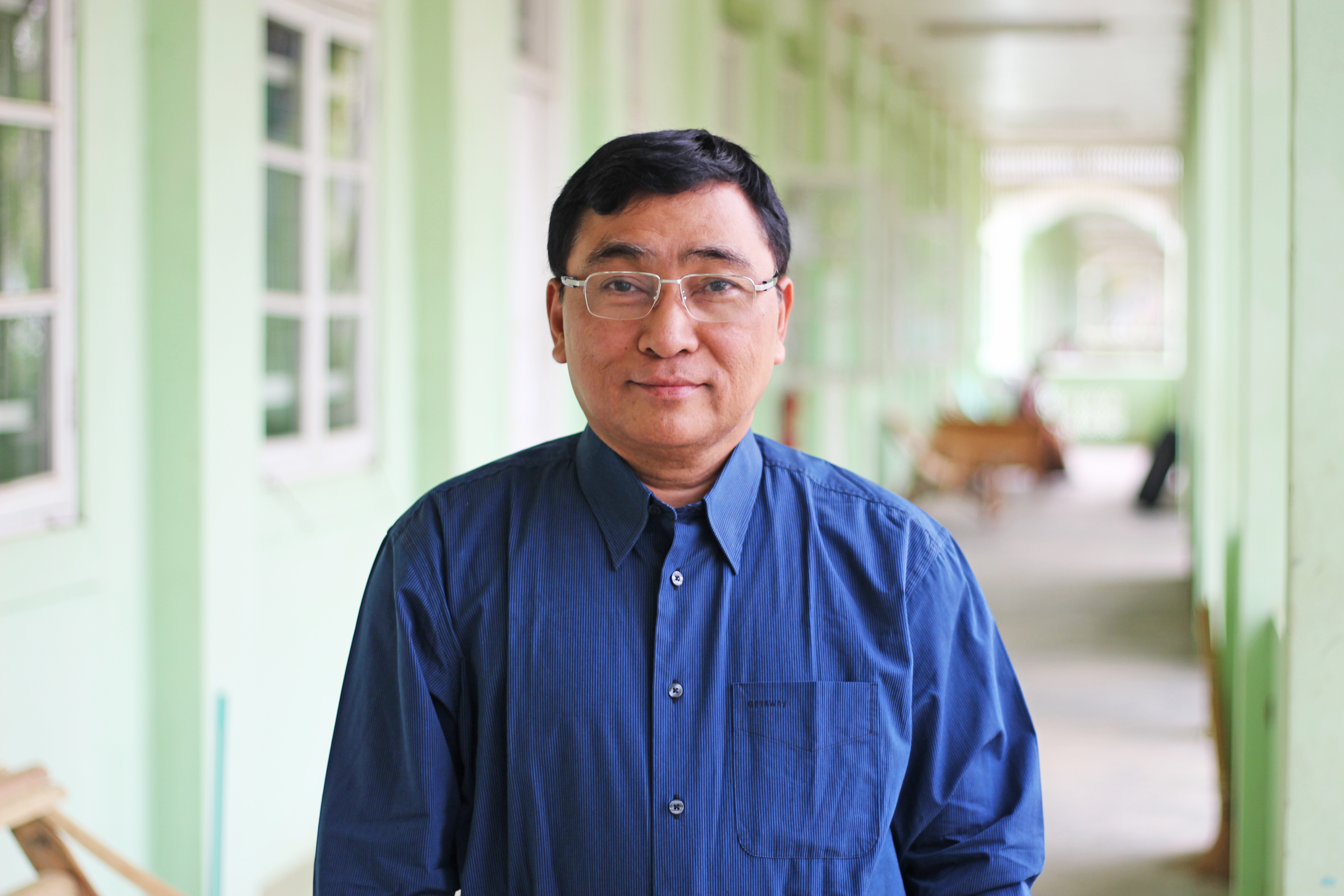
Social Welfare Minister

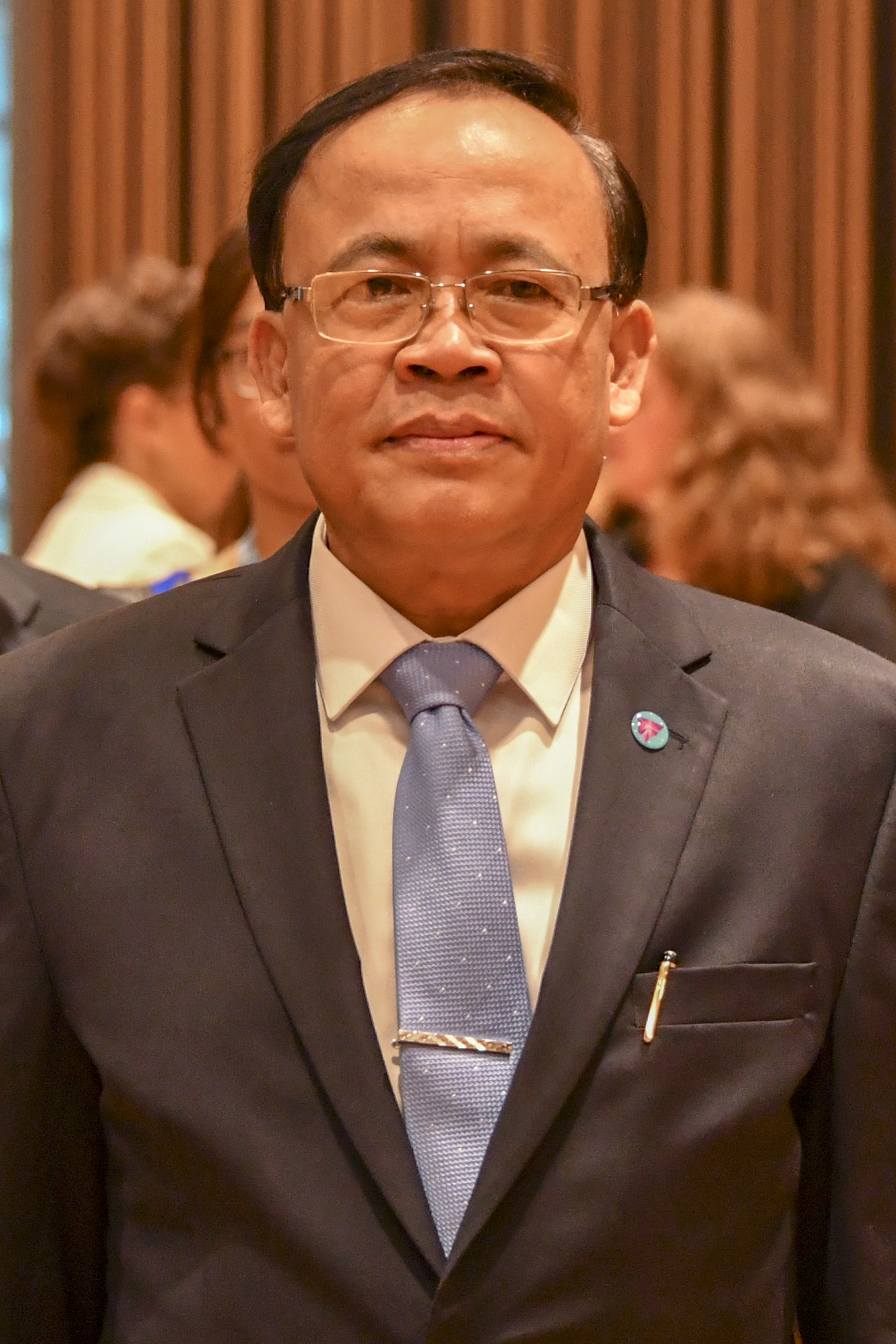
International Cooperation Minister

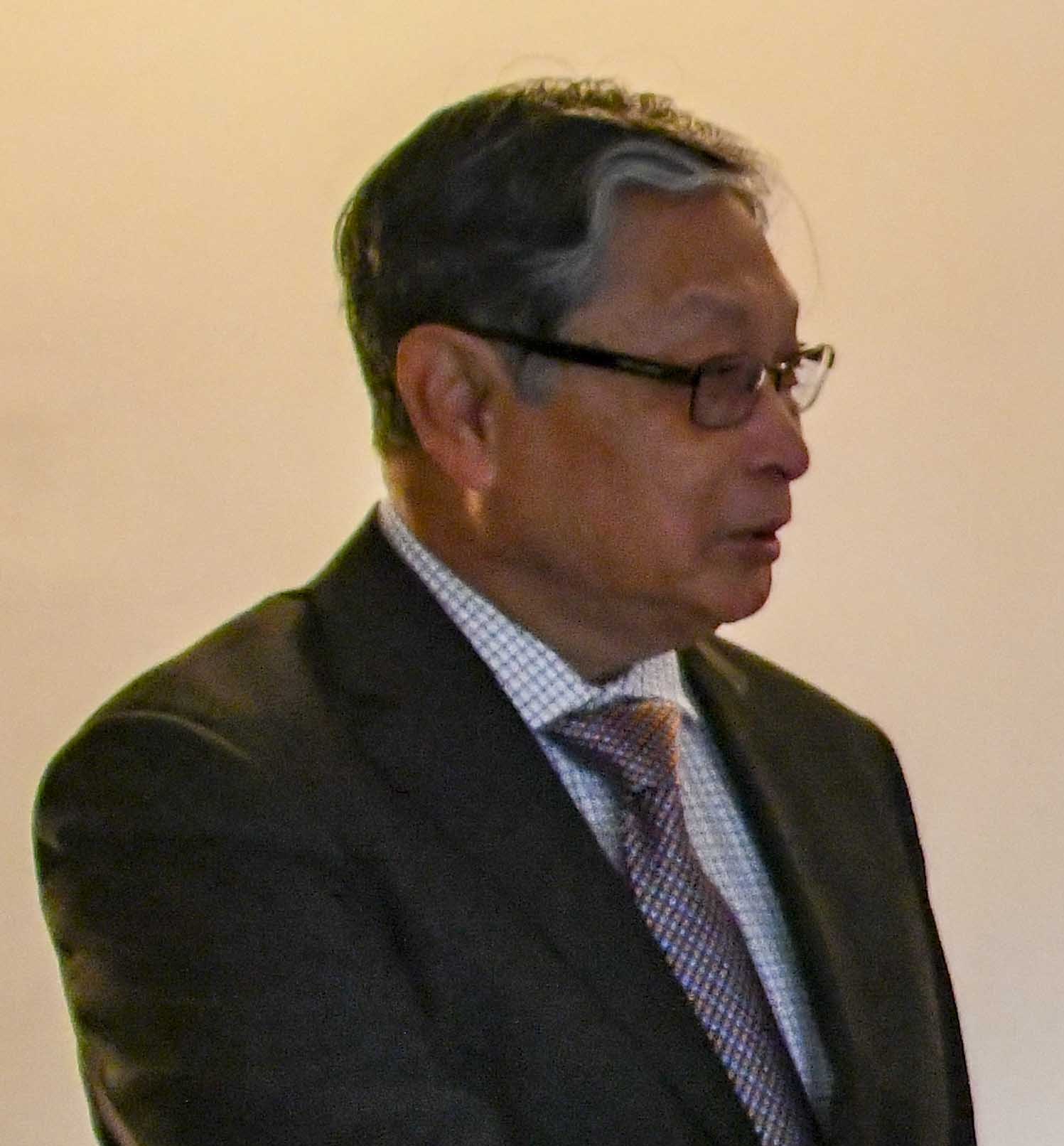
State Counsellor's Office Minister

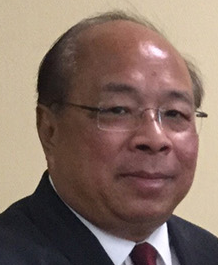
Union Government Office Minister

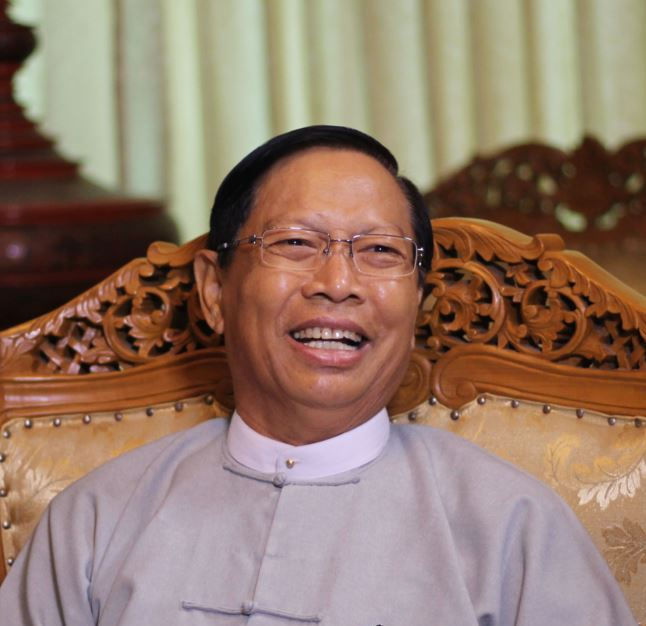
Religious Affairs and Culture Minister

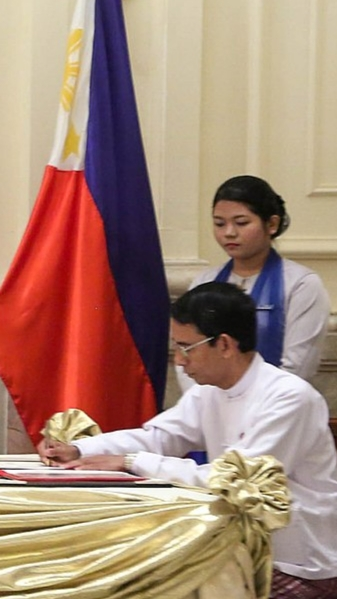
Agriculture Minister

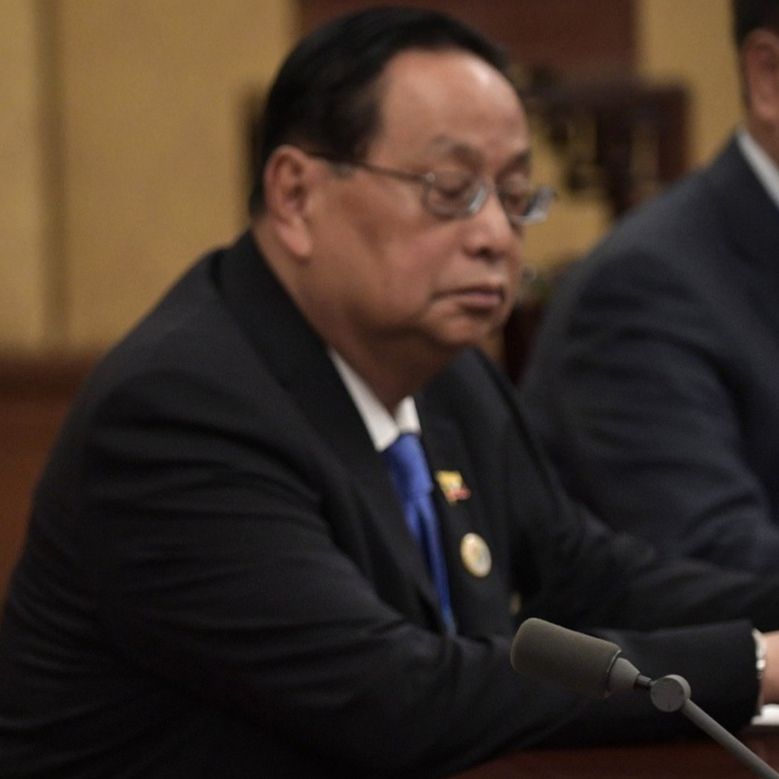
Electricity and Energy Minister
