= Myanmar Investment Commission =

Government agency of Myanmar

Myanmar Investment Commission (MIC)
- မြန်မာနိုင်ငံ ရင်းနှီးမြှုပ်နှံမှု ကော်မရှင်

Agency overview
- Formed: April 1994
- Jurisdiction: Myanmar (Burma)
- Headquarters: No.1, Thitsar Road, Yankin Township, Yangon
- Agency executives: Moe Myint Tun, Chairman; Aung Naing Oo, Vice chairman
- Parent Agency: Ministry of Investment and Foreign Economic Relations
- Website: www.dica.gov.mm

The Myanmar Investment Commission (Burmese: မြန်မာနိုင်ငံ ရင်းနှီးမြှုပ်နှံမှု ကော်မရှင်, abbreviated MIC) is a government-appointed body formerly under the Ministry of Investment and Foreign Economic Relations that appraises domestic investment proposals in Myanmar (Burma). The Myanmar Investment Commission is now under the Ministry of National Planning, Investment and Foreign Economic Relations. MIC was formed in April 1994, after the State Law and Order Restoration Council issued the Myanmar Citizens Investment Law. In 2000, MIC underwent organisational changes to reduce the number of committee members to four. MIC also manages the 1988 Foreign Investment Law. The body was re-established in 2016 as an 11-member committee to scrutinise economic proposals.

== History ==
A new set of reforms (2012) drafted for the Myanmar investment law included a proposal to transform the Myanmar Investment Commission from a government-appointed body into an independent board. This could bring greater transparency to the process of issuing investment licenses, according to the proposed reforms drafted by experts and senior officials. The current key positions, however, are still held by senior government officials, including ministers and their deputies.

In March 2020, Distributed Denial of Secrets published 156 gigabytes of data hacked from the Myanmar Investment Commission. The leak revealed how millions of dollars allegedly flowed from Mytel subscribers to Myanmar military generals, and exposed business dealings of family members of prominent military leaders.

== Chairman (2011 - Current) ==
No	Name	Position	Ministry	term start	term end
1	Soe Thein	Union minister	Office of the President		
2	Win Shein	Union minister	Ministry of Finance and Revenue	7 September 2012	30 March 2016
3	Kyaw Win	Union minister	Ministry of Planning and Finance	30 March 2016	16 June 2018
4	Thaung Tun	Union minister	Ministry of Union Government Office; Ministry of Investment and Foreign Economic Relations	16 June 2018	1 February 2021
5	Lieutenant General Moe Myint Tun	Council member	State Administration Council	4 March 2021	19 September 2023
6	General Mya Tun Oo	Council Member and Deputy Prime Minister	State Administration Council	19 September 2023	Incumbent

== Organisation ==
The new commission was formed by SAC Chairman Min Aung Hlaing in 2021.

1. Moe Myint Tun (Chairman) - member of SAC
2. Aung Naing Oo (Vice Chairman) - Union minister of Investment and Foreign Economic Relations
3. Khin Maung Yee (Member) - Union minister of Natural Resources and Environmental Conservation
4. Dr Thida Oo (Member) - Attorney General
5. Nyunt Aung (Member) - Deputy minister of Commerce
6. Win Thaw (Member) - Vice chairman of Central Bank
7. Kyaw Min Oo (Member) - Permanent Secretary of Ministry of Agriculture, Livestock and Irrigation
8. Min Htut (Member) - Director General of Internal Revenue Department (Ministry of Planning and Finance)
9. Thant Sin Lwin (Secretary) - Director General of Directorate of Investment & Company Administration (Ministry of Investment and Foreign Economic Relations)

== Designation of Development Zone ==
The Myanmar Investment Commission (MIC) designated 3 development zones on 22 February 2017 for purposes of income tax exemption and relief. The established zones 1, 2 and 3 refer to the less developed regions, moderate developed regions and developed regions, respectively. The investment in the designated zone 1, which comprises the less developed regions, will receive tax exemption for 7 years. There is a 5 years of tax exemption for the moderated developed regions, and 3 years for the developed regions. The classification of zones is defined based on the township administrative division. The classification of zone can be updated periodically through MIC notifications. For example, 13 among 45 townships of Yangon region ( Dala, Dawmu, Thongwa, etc.) are designed as moderated developed zone and other townships falls into developed zone. It is notable that the township of Dawei Special Economic Zone, the third established SEZ of Myanmar is designed to zone 1 as the less develop regions.

=== Zone 1: Less Developed Regions ===
Sr. No.	Region/ State	District	Township	
1	Kachin State	Myitkyina District	1	Chibwe Township
			2	Tsawlaw Township
			3	In-Jangyang Township
			4	Tanai Township
		Moenyin District	5	Mogaung Township
		Bahmo District	6	Shwegu Township
			7	Momauk Township
			8	Mansi Township
			9	Bahmo Township
		Putao District	10	Putao Township
			11	Naungmung Township
			12	Machanbaw Township
			13	Sumprabum Township
			14	Kaunglanhpu Township
2	Kayah State	Bawlakhe District	1	BawlakheTownship
			2	Hpasaung Township
			3	Mese Township
		Loikaw District	4	Loikaw Township
			5	Demawso Township
			6	Hpruso Township
			7	Shataw Township
3	Kayin State	Hpa-an District	1	Hpa-an Township
			2	Hlaignbwe Township
			3	Papun Township
			4	Thandaunggyi Township
		Kawkareik District	5	Kawkareik Township
			6	Kyain Seikkyi Township
		Myawady District	7	Myawady Township
4	Chin State	Falam District	1	Falam Township
			2	Tiddim Township
			3	Hton Zan Township
		Haka District	4	Haka Township
			5	Htan Ta Lang Township
		Mindat District	6	Mindat Township
			7	Matupi Township
			8	Kanpetlet Township
			9	Paletwa Township
5	Sagaing Region	Sagaing District	1	Myinmu Township
			2	Myaung Township
		Shwebo District	3	Khin-U Township
			4	Wetlet Township
			5	Kanbalu Township
			6	Taze Township
			7	Ye-U Township
			8	Kyunhla Township
			9	Tabayin Township
		Monywa District	10	Budalin Township
			11	Ayadaw Township
			12	Salingyi Township
			13	Pale Township
			14	Yinmabin Township
			15	Kani Township
			16	Chaung-U Township
		Hkamti District	17	Hkamti Township
			18	Homalin Township
			19	Leshi Township
			20	Lahe Township
			21	Namyung Township
		Katha District	22	Katha Township
			23	Kawlin Township
			24	Indaw Township
			25	Wuntho Township
			26	Pinlebu Township
			27	Banmouk Township
			28	Tigyain Township
		Mawlaik District	29	Mawlaik Township
			30	Phaungbyin Township
		Kale District	31	Kale Township
			32	Mingin Township
			33	Kalewa Township
		Tamu District	34	Tamu Township
6	Tanintharyi Region	Dawei District	1	Thayetchaung Township
		Myeik District	2	Palaw Township
			3	Tanintharyi Township
			4	Khamaukgyi Township
7	Bago Region	Bago District	1	Shwegyin Township
		Thayarwady District	2	Monyo Township
		Taungoo District	3	Htantabin Township
			4	Kyaukgyi Township
		Pyay District	5	Paukkaung Township
8	Magwe Region	Magwe District	1	Chauk Township
			2	Myothit Township
			3	Natmauk Township
		Minbu District	4	Sidoktaya Township
		Thayet District	5	Kanma Township
			6	Mindon Township
			7	Sinbaungwe Township
		Pakokku District	8	Myaing Township
			9	Pauk Township
			10	Seikphyu Township
		Gangaw District	11	Gangaw Township
			12	Htilin Township
			13	Saw Township
9	Mandalay Region	Myingyan District	1	Myingyan(Myotha)Township
			2	Ngazun Township
10	Mon State	Mawlamyine District	1	Chaungzon Township
			2	Kyaikmayaw Township
11	Rakhine State	Kyaukphyu District	1	Kyaukphyu Township
			2	Manaung Township
			3	Rambree Township
			4	Ann Township
		Maungdaw District	5	Maungdaw Township
		Buthidaung District	6	Buthidaung Township
		Sittwe District	7	Sittwe Township
			8	Ponnagyun Township
			9	Mrauk-U Township
			10	Kyauktaw Township
			11	Minbya Township
			12	Myebon Township
			13	Pauktaw Township
			14	Rathedaung Township
		Thandwe District	15	Thandwe Township
			16	Taunggup Township
			17	Gwa Township
12	Shan State	Taunggyi District	1	Hopong Township
			2	Hsi Hseng Township
			3	Pingdaya Township
			4	Ywangan Township
			5	Yatsauk Township
			6	Pinlaung Township
			7	Pekon Township
		Loilem District	8	Kunhein Township
			9	Kyethi Township
			10	Mong Kung Township
			11	Mong Hsu Township
		Lengkhe District	12	Lengkhe Township
			13	Moh Nai Township
			14	Mawkmai Township
			15	Mong Pan Township
		Kengtong District	16	Mong Hkat Township
			17	Mong Yang Township
			18	Mong La Township
		Mong Sat District	19	Mong Sat Township
			20	Mong Ton Township
			21	Mong Pying Township
		Tachileik District	22	Tachileik Township
		Mong Hpyak District	23	Mong Hpyak Township
			24	Mong Yaung Township
		Lashio District	26	Theinni Township
			27	Mongyai Township
		Muse District	28	Namkam Township
			29	Kutkai Township
		Kyaukme District	30	Namtu Township
			31	Namhsan Township
			32	Mantone Township
			33	Moemaik Township
			34	Mabein Township
		Laukkai District	35	Laukkai Township
			36	Konggyan Township
		Hopang District	37	Hopang Township
			38	Mongmao Township
			39	Pangwaing Township
		Metman District	40	Metman Township
			41	Nahpan Township
			42	Pangsang Township
13	Ayeyarwady Region	Pathein District	1	Thabaung Township
			2	Ngapudaw Township
			3	Pathein Township (Only Shwetaungyan Town, ChaungThar Town, Ngwesaung Town in Pathein Township)
		Hinthada District	4	Myanaung Township
			5	Kyangin Township
			6	Ingabu Township
			7	Lemyethna Township
		Labutta District	8	Labutta Township
			9	Mawlamyinekyun Township
		Pyapon District	10	Bogale Township

=== Zone 2: Moderate Developed Regions ===
Sr. No.	Region/ State	District	Township	
1	Kachin State	Myitkyina District	1	Myitkyina Township
			2	Waingmaw Township
		Mohnyin District	3	Mohnyin Township
			4	Hpakant Township
2	Sagaing Region	Sagaing District	1	Sagaing Township
		Shwebo District	2	Shwebo Township
		Monywa District	3	Monywa Township
3	Tanintharyi Region	Dawei District	1	Dawei Township
			2	Yebyu Township
			3	Launglon Township
		Myeik District	4	Kyunsu Township
			5	Myeik Township
		Kawthoung District	6	Kawthoung Township
			7	Bokpyin Township
4	Bago Region	Thayawady District	1	Thayawady Township
			2	Minhla Township
			3	Letpadan Township
			4	Okpo Township
			5	Gyobingauk Township
			6	Zigon Township
			7	Nattalin Township
		Pyay District	8	Pyay Township
			9	Padaung Township
			10	Paungde Township
			11	Shwedaung Township
			12	Thegon Township
		Taungoo District	13	Taungoo Township
			14	Yedashe Township
			15	Oktwin Township
			16	Phyu Township
		Bago District	17	Kyaukdaga Township
			18	Daik-U Township
			19	Nyaunglaybin Township
			20	Bago Township
			21	Kawa Township
			22	Thanatpin Township
			23	Waw Township
5	Magwe Region	Magwe District	1	Magwe Township
			2	Yenangyaung Township
			3	Taungdwingyi Township
		Minbu District	4	Minbu Township
			5	Pwintbyu Township
			6	Salin Township
			7	Ngape Township
		Thayet District	8	Thayet Township
			9	Minhla Township
			10	Aunglan Township
		Pakokku District	11	Pakokku Township
			12	Yesagyo Township
6	Mandalay Region	Myingyan District	1	Myingyan Township
			2	Nahtogyi Township
			3	Kyaukpadaung Township
			4	Taungtha Township
		Meiktila District	5	Mahlaing Township
			6	Thazi Township
		Kyaukse District	7	Kyaukse Township
			8	Tada-U Township
		Pyinoolwin District	9	Pyinoolwin Township
			10	Thabeikkyin Township
			11	Singu Township
			12	Madaya Township
			13	Mogok Township
7	Mon State	Thaton District	1	Thaton Township
			2	Kyaikhto Township
			3	Paung Township
			4	Bilin Township
		Mawlamyine District	5	Mawlamyine Township
			6	Thanbyuzayat Township
			7	Mudon Township
			8	Ye Township
8	Yangon Region	Yangon(South) District	1	Kyauktan Township
			2	Dala Township
			3	Seikgyi Kanaungto Township
			4	Kawmu Township
			5	Kayan Township
			6	Kungyangon Township
			7	Thongwa Township
			8	Twante Township
			9	Cocokyun Township
		Yangon(North) District	10	Hlegu Township
			11	Taikgyi Township
			12	Hmawbi Township
		Yangon (East) District	13	Thanlyin Township
9	Shan State	Taunggyi District	1	Taunggyi Township
			2	Kalaw Township
			3	Nyaungshwe Township
		Loilen District	4	Loilen Township
			5	Lai-Hka Township
			6	Nansan Township
		Kengtong District	7	Kengtong Township
		Lashio District	8	Lashio Township
			9	Tangyan Township
		Kunlong District	10	Kunlong Township
		Muse District	11	Muse Township
		Kyaukme District	12	Kyaukme Township
			13	Hsipaw Township
			14	Naungcho Township
10	Ayeyarwady Region	Pathein District	1	Pathein Township (except Shwetaungyan Town, ChaungThar Town, Ngwesaung Town in Pathein Township)
			2	Kangyidaung Township
			3	Yegyi Township
			4	Kyaunggone Township
			5	Kyonpyaw Township
		Hinthada District	6	Hinthada Township
			7	Zalun Township
		Ma-ubin District	8	Ma-ubin Township
			9	Pantanaw Township
			10	Nyaungdon Township
			11	Danubyu Township
		Myaungmya District	12	Myaungmya Township
			13	Einme Township
			14	Wakema Township
		Pyapon District	15	Pyapon Township
			16	Kyaiklat Township
			17	Dedaye Township
11	Nay Pyi Taw Union Territory	Dekkhina District	1	Zabuthiri Township
			2	Dekkhinathiri Township
			3	Lewe Township
			4	Pyinmana Township
		Oktara District	5	Oktarathiri Township
			6	Zeyathiri Township
			7	Pobbathiri Township
			8	Tatkon Township

=== Zone 3: Developed Regions ===
Sr. No.	Region/ State	District	Township	
1	Mandalay Region	Mandalay District	1	Aungmyaythazan Township
			2	Chanayetharzan Township
			3	Mahaaungmye Township
			4	Chanmyatharzi Township
			5	Pyigyidagon Township
			6	Amarapura Township
			7	Patheingyi Township
		Kyaukse District	8	Myittha Township
			9	Singaing Township
		Meikhtila District	10	Meikhtila Township
			11	Wundwin Township
		Nyaung-U District	12	Nyaung-U Township
		Yamethin District	13	Yamethin Township
			14	Pyawbwe Township
2	Yangon Region	Yangon (East) District	1	Botataung Township
			2	North Okkalapa Township
			3	Pazundaung Township
			4	South Okkalapa Township
			5	Thingangyun Township
			6	Yankin Township
			7	Dawbon Township
			8	Mingalar Taungnyunt Township
			9	Tamwe Township
			10	Thaketa Township
			11	East Dagon Township
			12	North Dagon Township
			13	Dagon Seikkan Township
			14	Mingaladon Township
			15	Shwepyitha Township
			16	Hlaingthaya Township
			17	South Dagon Township
		Yangon(North) District	18	Insein Township
			19	Htantabin Township
		Yangon(West) District	20	Hlaing Township
			21	Kamayut Township
			22	Mayangon Township
			23	Ahlon Township
			24	Bahan Township
			25	Dagon Township
			26	Kyauktada Township
			27	Kyimyindaing Township
			28	Lanmadaw Township
			29	Latha Township
			30	Pabedan Township
			31	Sanchaung Township
			32	Seikkan Township
