= Min Thu =

Min Thu may refer to:

- Min Thu (footballer)
- Min Thu (politician)
