= Zaw Htay =

Burmese former military officer and politician (died 2022)

Major Zaw Htay
- ဇော်ဌေး
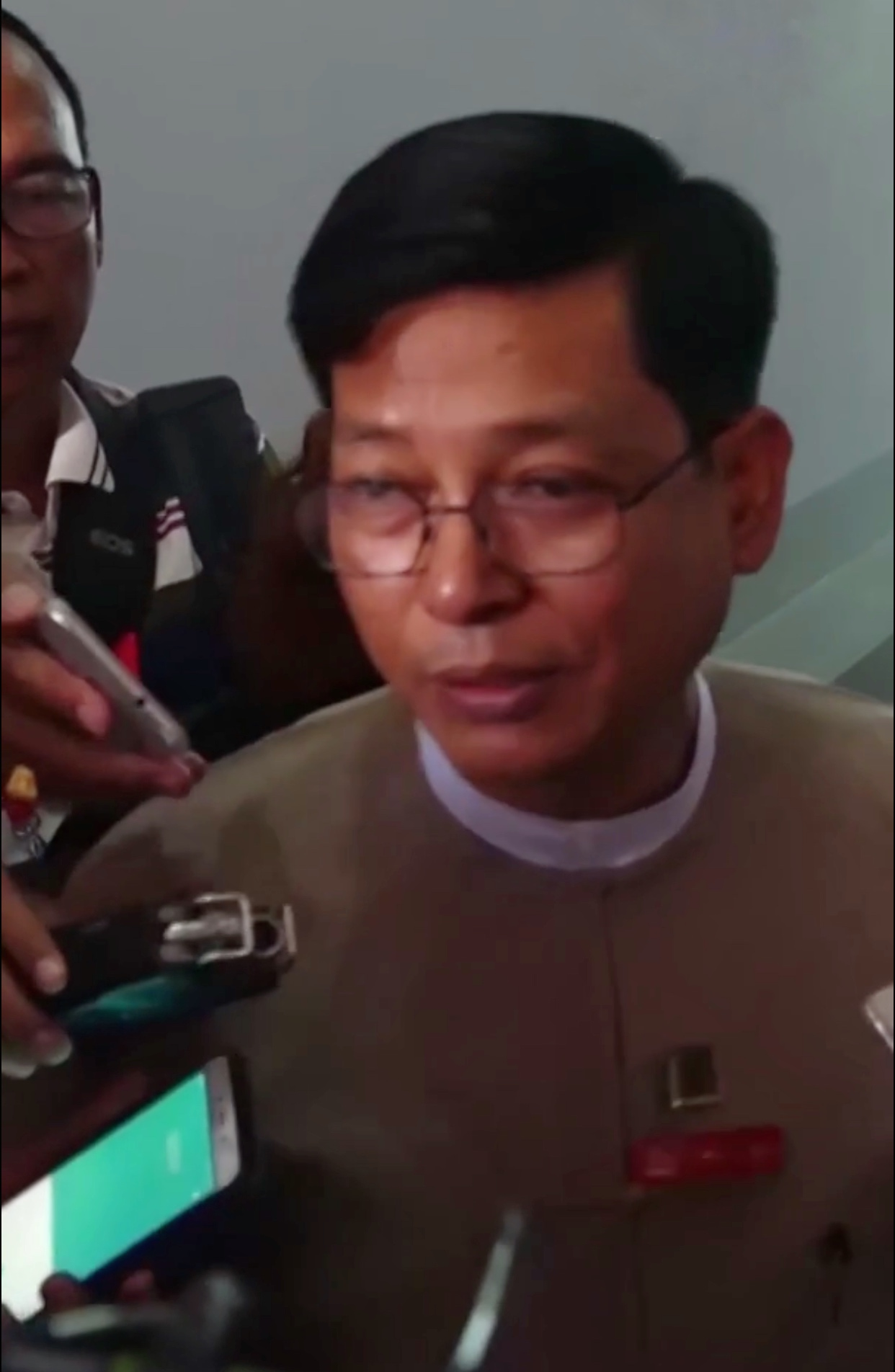
- Zaw Htay in 2018

Director general of the Union Peace Formation
- In office April 2016 – 1 February 2021
- President: Htin Kyaw; Win Myint
- State Counsellor: Aung San Suu Kyi

Deputy director general of Myanmar President Office
- In office April 2016 – 1 February 2021
- President: Htin Kyaw; Win Myint

Spokesman of Myanmar President Office
- In office April 2011 – April 2016
- President: Thein Sein

Personal details
- Born: 5 September 1973 Magway, Burma
- Died: 23 May 2022 (age 48)

Military service
- Allegiance: Burma
- Branch/service: Myanmar Army
- Rank: Major

Zaw Htay (Burmese: ဇော်ဌေး; pronounced [zɔ dè], also known as Hmuu Zaw (Burmese: မူးဇော်; pronounced [m̥ú zɔ̀]; 5 September 1973 – 23 May 2022) was a Burmese politician, former military officer and spokesman of the Myanmar government. Zaw Htay had served as the director general of the Union Peace Formation under State Counsellor's Office from April 2016 to February 2021. He had previously served as the presidential spokesman of the Myanmar Office of the President from April 2011 to April 2016 under President Thein Sein.

== Career ==
A graduate of the 37th intake of the Defense Services Academy, Zaw Htay served in the Myanmar Army and went on to join the military regime then known as the State Peace and Development Council (SPDP). He subsequently worked in the office of Prime Minister General Soe Win. After General Soe Win died in 2007, Zaw Htay retired from the military with the rank of major and joined the Union Solidarity and Development Association (USDA).

Zaw Htay became the director and spokesman for the Myanmar President Office under Thein Sein. Under the pen name Hmuu Zaw, he became known for his active presence on social media. He used his Facebook account to spar with NLD supporters and occasionally contributed articles to local media outlets, bolstering the reputation of Thein Sein and the Myanmar military. His critics describe him as a strong advocate of former President Thein Sein. In November 2011, writing in The Washington Post, he called on the US and other nations "to help facilitate Myanmar’s connection to the outside world at this critical juncture."

Aung San Suu Kyi picked Zaw Htay to be her spokesman. Zaw Htay was promoted as deputy director general of the president office under Htin Kyaw in April 2016 and appointed director general of the Union Peace Formation under the State Counsellor's Office in 2016.

As a government spokesperson, Zaw Htay spoke the attitudes of the NLD government in regularly held press conferences at Presidential Palace. In the run-up to and after the election, Zaw Htay from the government side and Major General Zaw Min Tun from the Tatmadaw side, who were his weekly counterparts, often expressed their concerns at press conferences. At a press conference in January 2021, Zaw Htay said political parties and organizations questioning the result of the recent elections are committing political suicide. That has resulted in military rage hightly.

After the military coup on 1 February 2021, Zaw Htay was out of sight and detained. He was released in June 2021. A few months after his release, Zaw Htay died of a heart attack at the 1000-bed Naypyidaw Hospital on May 23, 2022 at around 9:00 a.m.
