= Khin Myo Kyi =

Burmese politician

- ခင်မျိုးကြည်

Advocate General of Yangon Region
- Incumbent
- Assumed office 28 September 2018
- President: Win Myint
- Preceded by: Han Htoo

Personal details
- Born: 1957 (age 68–69) Nganzun Township, Myanmar
- Occupation: Attorney
- Known for: Advocate General of Yangon Region

Khin Myo Kyi (Burmese: ခင်မျိုးကြည်; born 1957) is a Burmese lawyer and incumbent Advocate General of Yangon Region. On 28 September 2018, the Yangon Region Parliament unanimously approved her as the new Advocate General of Yangon Region, replacing Han Htoo.

== Early life and career ==
Khin was born on 1957 in Nganzun Township, Mandalay Region, Myanmar. She is a high court lawyer and lives in Chanayethazan Township, Mandalay. She has served 23 years as a law officer in the region before serving as an assistant director or deputy director in the attorney general’s offices in Mandalay, Sagaing Region and Naypyidaw. She then spent two years as a director with the Union Attorney General’s Office before retiring in June 2019.

From 1984 to 2001, Khin had served as a Legal staff (Level 4) at Nganzun Township and Aungmyethazan Township. From 2001 to 2007, she served as a Township law officer (Level 3) at Patheingyi Law Office. From 2007 to 2013, she served as Deputy director (in charge of the district level) at Mandalay Attorney General's Office (Regional office).

In addition, she had served as Deputy director at Sagaing Advocate General's Office in Monywa and the Federal Attorney General's Office in Naypyidaw Union Territory from 2013 to 2015. In 2016, she served as State legal officer at Kayin State Advocate General's Office in Pa-an.

From 2016 until 2018, she served as director at the Union Attorney General's Office in Naypyidaw Union Territory.

=== Advocate General of Yangon Region ===
Khin has been nominated for the vacant post of Yangon Region Advocate General, replacing Han Htoo, who was arrested for allegedly taking bribes to drop a murder case.

On 26 September 2018, Chief Minister of Yangon Region Phyo Min Thein nominated her to be the new Advocate General at the Yangon Region parliament and unanimously approved and appointed her as the new Advocate General of Yangon Region on 28 September 2018.
