= Han Htoo =

Burmese politician

- ဟန်ထူး

Advocate General of Yangon Region
- In office ? – 14 September 2018
- President: Htin Kyaw; Win Myint
- Succeeded by: Khin Myo Kyi

Personal details
- Born: Myanmar
- Spouse: Khin Khin Kywe
- Occupation: Lawyer, Attorney

Han Htoo (Burmese: ဟန်ထူး) is a Burmese lawyer who previously served as the Advocate General of Yangon Region. He was removed from his position following corruption charges on 14 September 2018.

== Arrested under section 55 of the Anti-Corruption Law ==
On 13 September 2018, Han Htoo and five other officials including a judge, law officers and a police officer were arrested under bribery charges filed by the Anti-Corruption Commission of Myanmar for accepting more than 70 million kyats (nearly US$46,300) to drop the case against three suspects in the murder of actor Yell Htwe Aung.
