= Thaung Tun (politician) =

Burmese politician

- သောင်းထွန်း
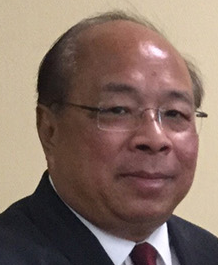
- Thaung Tun in 2018

Union minister of Investment and Foreign Economic Relations
- In office 19 November 2018 – 1 February 2021
- President: Win Myint
- Preceded by: position established
- Succeeded by: Aung Naing Oo

Chairman of Myanmar Investment Commission
- In office 16 June 2018 – 1 February 2021
- President: Win Myint
- Preceded by: Kyaw Win
- Succeeded by: Lieutenant General Moe Myint Tun

Union minister of office of the Union Government
- In office 23 November 2017 – 19 November 2018
- Preceded by: position established
- Succeeded by: Min Thu

National Security Advisor
- In office 10 January 2017 – 2018
- Preceded by: position established

Director General of political affairs of Foreign Affairs ministry
- In office 2001–2005
- Minister: Win Aung

Myanmar Ambassador to Philippines
- In office 2005–2008

Personal details
- Education: Rangoon Arts and Science University; Rangoon Institute of Foreign Language

Thaung Tun (Burmese: သောင်းထွန်း) is a Burmese politician, a former union minister for ministry of Investment and Foreign Economic Relations and ministry of Union Government Office, former national security advisor and former chairman of Myanmar Investment Commission.

== Education ==
He graduated with B.Sc. from Rangoon Arts and Science University and a diploma in French from Institute of Foreign Language, Rangoon. He also attended the School of Advanced International Studies (SAIS) at Johns Hopkins University near Washington, D.C., as a Fulbright Scholar from 1984 to 1985.

== Career ==
=== foreign affairs ===
Thaung Tun joined ministry of Foreign Affairs in 1972 and served at headquarters and abroad and retired in 2010. He served as ambassador to the Philippines, Belgium, the Netherlands and the EU under the former military regime. He also served as director general for political affairs department of Foreign Affairs ministry. While serving as ambassador to Philippines, he said at a 2006 press conference in Manila that a detained Aung San Suu Kyi "must not rock the boat" when commenting on the NLD boycott of the military junta's controversial constitution convention . In 2016, he served as Government Relations Advisor for Shell Myanmar Energy PTE.

=== National Security Advisor ===
In 2017 president Htin Kyaw appointed him in new position, National Security Advisor. The position was created as the government faces ongoing clashes with ethnic armed groups in the country's north and east while attacks by Muslim militants with international connections sparked a large security operation in western Rakhine State.

=== Union Minister ===
He became the union minister of newly formed ministry, Union Government Office Ministry in November 2017. He was appointed by president Htin Kyaw. This ministry serves the duties of the Union Government.

In November 2018, the President U Win Myint proposed the formation of the new Union-level ministry to Hluttaw for approval. The new ministry will be a merger between the Foreign Economic Relations Department and the Directorate of Investment and Company Administration from the Ministry of Planning and Finance. The cabinet's representative Tun Tun Oo said the formation of the new ministry would provide swifter investment-related information to local and international investors, real-time collaboration with relevant departments and dispute resolution among investors. The Pyidaungsu Hluttaw approved the formation in November 2018. Thaung Tun has been transferred from government office minister to his new position of minister for the Ministry of Investment and Foreign Economic Relations.

=== Chairman of MIC ===
After the resignation of Planning and Finance minister Kyaw Win who also the Chairman of Myanmar Investment Commission, Thaung Tun became the new chairman. President Win Myint formed the new commission with 13 members. Investment and Foreign Economic minister Thaung Tun served as chairman and Commerce minister Than Myint served as vice chairman.

In the aftermath of the military-led 2021 Myanmar coup d'état, the Myanmar Armed Forces appointed Aung Naing Oo as Thaung Tun's successor for investment and foreign economic minister on 1 February 2021. On 4 March 2021, a member of State Administration Council Lieutenant General Moe Myint Tun became the new chairman for MIC.
