= Yin Myo Su =

- ယဉ်မျိုးစု
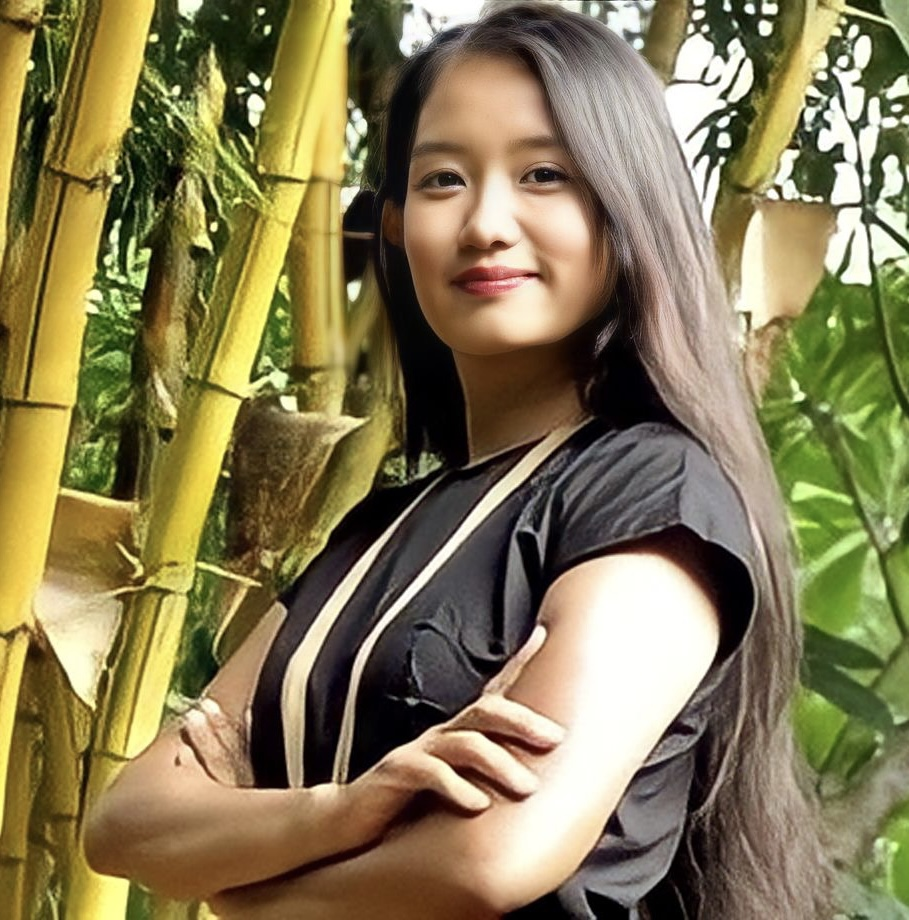
- Yin Myo Su in 2013
- Born: 1972 (age 53–54); Nyaungshwe, Shan State, Myanmar
- Education: École hôtelière de Lausanne
- Known for: Businesswoman
- Parent(s): Ohn Maung; Khin Than Nwe
- Awards: Global Leadership Award (2015); Goldman Sachs & Fortune Global Women Leaders Award (2013); Vital Voices Global Leadership Award (2015, 2017)

Yin Myo Su (Burmese: ယဉ်မျိုးစု; born 1972), also known as Misuu, is a Burmese businesswoman and cultural promoter. She founded the Inthar Heritage House and is the managing director of the Inle Princess Resort in Shan State and the Mrauk-U Princess Resort in Rakhine State. The Inthar Heritage House is a traditional building dedicated to promoting Inthar culture and heritage.

Through her attempts to preserve local ethnic Intha traditions and the natural environment of Inle Lake, she has been called the "Lady of the Lake". She has played a significant role in reintroducing the Burmese cat – a breed believed to have originated on the Thai-Myanmar border – to Myanmar but has since transformed into a foundation for preserving Inle Lake's nature and culture.

== Early life ==
Yin Myo Su was born in 1972 in Nyaungshwe, Shan State, Burma. She was the daughter of Ohn Maung, a politician and former minister of hotels and tourism, and his wife Khin Than Nwe. Her father opened the guest house Inlay Inn in Nyangshwe in 1976.

== Career ==
In 1988, when she was 16 years old, Yin Myo Su was concerned about the news of the brutal crackdown on student protests during the 8888 Uprising in Rangoon, and with a strong sense of injustice and right, she begins advocating for the pro-democracy movement and joins the NLD Youth Committee. Inadvertently, her family gets pulled into the political sphere when her father runs as a candidate for the widely supported National League for Democracy and successfully wins his seat in Nyaungshwe at the 1990 Myanmar general election, but was not allowed to assume his seat.

She fled abroad after a failed democracy movement. However, her father was imprisoned for more than a year under the re-established military regime. In 1991, she enrolled in the École hôtelière de Lausanne and successfully completed her studies after three years. She eventually returns to Myanmar and helped out in her family's hotel business after completing her overseas studies. She started work on Inle Princess in 1996 and opened it in 1998.

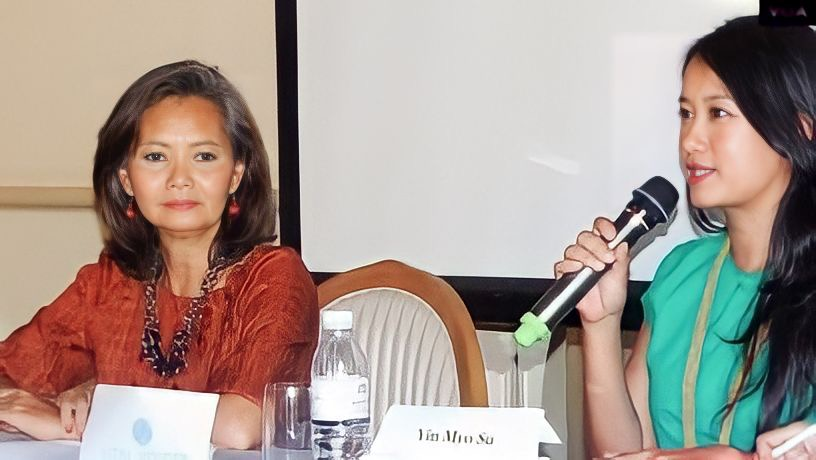
Yin Myo Su talks next to Mu Sochua at a press conference in Phnom Penh, on May 16, 2014

In 2012, Yin was selected as a mentee for the Fortune-U.S. Department of State program and later participated in the International Alumnae Component in 2018. In 2013, she founded the Inle Heritage Hospitality Vocational Training School. The school aims to empower and uplift the local community by providing vocational training in hospitality and leadership development, with a particular emphasis on sustainability, environmental responsibility, and preserving local heritage. Through her Inthar Heritage Foundation, Yin Myo Su has attempted to preserve local ethnic Intha traditions and the natural environment of Inle Lake. She was named one of two recipients of the 2013 Goldman Sachs & Fortune Global Women Leaders Award. She was recognized for her work with a Global Leadership Award in 2015, in recognition of her efforts towards promoting socially and economically responsible development. She also received the Vital Voices Global Leadership Award in 2015 and 2017. Yin Myo Su is part of the Emerging Leaders Special on Power List Asia by CNA and was named one of the "Champions for Change" by The Irrawaddy in 2017.
