= Ko Ko Hlaing =

Burmese politician

- ကိုကိုလှိုင်
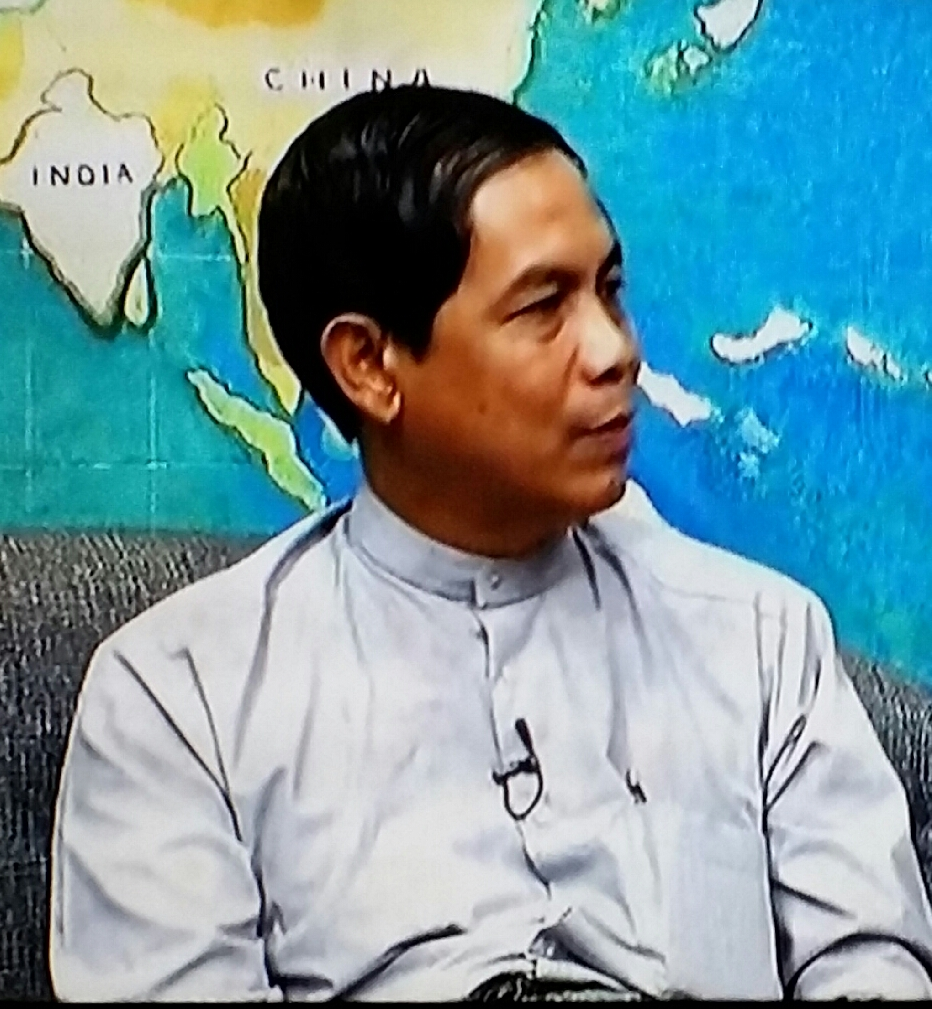
- Ko Ko Hlaing in 2015

Union Minister for International Cooperation
- In office 1 February 2021 – 3 August 2023
- President: Myint Swe (Acting)
- Leader: Min Aung Hlaing
- Preceded by: Kyaw Tin

Chief Political Advisor of the President's Office of Myanmar
- In office 19 April 2011 – 31 March 2016 Serving with Ye Tint and Nay Zin Latt
- Preceded by: Office established

Vice President of the Myanmar Writers and Journalists Association

Personal details
- Born: 24 October 1956 (age 70) Myinmu, Sagaing Region, Burma
- Education: Defence Services Academy
- Occupation: Researcher and writer
- Nickname(s): Sithu Aung; Hlaing Aung

Military service
- Allegiance: Myanmar
- Branch/service: Myanmar Army
- Rank: Colonel

Ko Ko Hlaing (Burmese: ကိုကိုလှိုင်, born 24 October 1956 in Myinmu) is a Burmese military researcher and writer, served under Thein Sein as the chief political advisor to the President's Office of Myanmar, after being appointed on 19 April 2011.

In 1976, he graduated from the Defence Services Academy. The following year, he joined the Myanmar Army, as a gazetted officer. From 1991 to 2004, he served as the War Office's First Class Chief Researcher. In 2004, he was promoted to the rank of Advisor of the Ministry of Information's Press Scrutiny and Registration Division, the country's chief censorship agency.

He served as the Union Minister for International Cooperation in Myanmar's military government.
