= Moe Myint Tun =

Former Burmese military general and State Administration Council member

His Excellency Lieutenant General Moe Myint Tun
- မိုးမြင့်ထွန်း

Member of the State Administration Council
- In office 2 February 2021 – 20 September 2023
- Leader: Min Aung Hlaing

Chairman of Myanmar Investment Commission
- In office 4 March 2021 – 20 September 2023
- Preceded by: Thaung Tun

Personal details
- Born: 24 May 1968 (age 58) Burma (now Myanmar)
- Citizenship: Burmese
- Spouse: Khaing Pa Pa Chit
- Children: Multiple, including: Yadanar Moe Myint; Moe Htet Htet Tun; Khaing Moe Myint
- Education: Defence Services Academy

Military service
- Allegiance: Tatmadaw
- Branch/service: Myanmar Army
- Years of service: 1989–2023
- Rank: Lieutenant General

Moe Myint Tun (Burmese: မိုးမြင့်ထွန်း; pronounced [moʊ maɪ̯ɴ tʊn]; born 24 May 1968) is a Burmese army general who served as a member of Myanmar's State Administration Council (SAC). He was appointed to the SAC on 2 February 2021, in the aftermath of the 2021 Myanmar coup d'état.

== Early life and education ==
Moe Myint Tun was born on 24 May 1968. He graduated from the Defence Services Academy in 1989 as part of the 30th intake.

== Career ==
Moe Myint Tun formerly served as army chief of staff and commander of the special operations bureau which oversees operations from the capital, Naypyidaw. From 2015 to 2017, he served as the commander of the Naypyidaw Command, which encompasses Naypyidaw Union Territory.

In September 2023, Moe Myint Tun and his subordinates, including Brigadier General Yan Naung Soe, were investigated for corruption by Military Security Affairs and the Bureau of Special Investigation. He was placed under house arrest for allegedly receiving millions of dollars in bribes from businessmen while chairing the Myanmar Investment Commission (MIC) and the Foreign Exchange Supervisory Committee (FESC) after the 2021 coup. He was replaced by General Mya Tun Oo as FESC chair on 18 September 2023. He was sacked as a member of the State Administration Council (SAC) on 20 September 2023.

On 10 October 2023, Myanmar's state-media announced that Moe Myint Tun, along with Brigadier General Yan Naung Soe were sentenced to life imprisonment by a military court, equivalent to 20 years in prison, for treason, bribery and illegal possession of foreign currency and abuse of power while holding high positions under on the SAC.

== Sanctions ==
The U.S. Department of the Treasury has imposed sanctions on Moe Myint Tun since 22 February 2021, pursuant to Executive Order 14014, for being an official of the military or security forces of Myanmar (Burma) and a member of the State Administration Council (SAC) responsible for killing of peaceful protestors. The US sanctions include freezing of assets under the US and ban on transactions with US person.

The Government of Canada has imposed sanctions on him since 18 February 2021, pursuant to Special Economic Measures Act and Special Economic Measures (Burma) Regulations, in response to the gravity of the human rights and humanitarian situation in Myanmar (formerly Burma). Canadian sanctions include freezing of assets under Canada and ban on transactions with Canadian person.

HM Treasury and the Foreign, Commonwealth and Development Office of the United Kingdom have imposed sanctions on him since 25 February 2021, for his responsibility for serious human rights violations in Burma. The UK sanctions include freezing of assets under the UK and ban on traveling or transiting to the UK.

Furthermore, the Council of the European Union has imposed sanctions on him since 22 March 2021, pursuant to Council Regulation (EU) 2021/479 and Council Implementing Regulation (EU) 2021/480 which amended Council Regulation (EU) No 401/2013, for his responsibility for the military coup and the subsequent military and police repression against peaceful demonstrators. The EU sanctions include freezing of assets under member countries of the EU and ban on traveling or transiting to the countries.

== Personal life ==
Moe Myint Tun is married to Khaing Pa Pa Chit (b. 1971), and has three daughters, Yadanar Moe Myint (b. 1994), Moe Htet Htet Tun (b. 1997), and Khaing Moe Myint (b. 2001). His children serve as directors for Yadanar Moe Htet Aung, Phyo Pyae Pyae, and Pin Gangaw companies, all of which won significant government tenders in the aftermath of the 2021 military coup.

== See also ==
State Administration Council

- Tatmadaw
- List of cabinet members of State Administration Council
- Myanmar Investment Commission
