= Office of the Attorney General (Myanmar) =

Burmese government agency

Office of the Union Attorney General
- ပြည်ထောင်စုရှေ့နေချုပ်ရုံး

Agency overview
- Formed: 1948; 78 years ago
- Type: Agency
- Jurisdiction: Government of Myanmar
- Headquarters: Naypyidaw, Myanmar
- Motto: The Legal Profession is a Noble Profession
- Agency executives: Dr Thida Oo, Union Attorney General; San Lwin, Deputy Union Attorney General
- Website: www.oag.gov.mm

The Office of the Attorney General of Myanmar (Burmese: ပြည်ထောင်စုရှေ့နေချုပ်ရုံး; abbreviated OAG) serves as the Government of Myanmar's main legal advisory body. The Office is led by the Union Attorney General of Myanmar. The incumbent Attorney General is Dr Thida Oo, who was appointed on 2 February 2021 by Min Aung Hlaing following Myanmar's latest military coup d'état on 1 February 2021. After the caretaker government was formed in 2021, the Union Attorney General's Office was reorganized into a ministry on 30 August 2021.

== Sanctions ==
On 31 January 2022, the U.S. Department of the Treasury added Attorney General, Thida Oo, to its Specially Designated Nationals (SDN) list. The UK and Canada joined the U.S in the sanctions against Oo, in a "coordinated action against Myanmar military regime, targeting individuals responsible for undermining democracy and rule of law".

== See also ==
- Attorney General of Myanmar
- Cabinet of Myanmar
- Ministry of Legal Affairs
- Politics of Myanmar
