= Ministry of Legal Affairs (Myanmar) =

Government ministry of Myanmar

- ဥပဒေရေးရာ ဝန်ကြီးဌာန
- seal of MOLA

Agency overview
- Formed: 30 August 2021; 4 years ago
- Preceding agency: Office of the Attorney General (Myanmar)
- Type: Ministry
- Jurisdiction: Government of Myanmar
- Headquarters: Office No (25), Naypyidaw
- Minister responsible: Thida Oo, Union Minister and Attorney General
- Deputy Minister responsible: Deputy Minister and Deputy Attorney General
- Website: www.mola.gov.mm

Ministry of Legal Affairs (Burmese: ဥပဒေရေးရာဝန်ကြီးဌာန) is a Burma government ministry that serves as the Government of Myanmar's main legal advisory body. The Ministry is led by the Union Minister Thida Oo who is also serves as Attorney General. After the caretaker government was formed after the 2021 Myanmar coup d'état, the Union Attorney General's Office was reorganized into a ministry on 30 August 2021.

== Departments ==
- Legislative and Advising Department
- Legal Advice Department
- Prosecution Department
- Administration Department

== List of ministers ==
=== Union ministers ===
No.	Portrait	Name	Term of office			Political party	Appointer
No.	Portrait	Name	Took office	Left office	Days	Political party	Appointer
1		Thida Oo	30 August 2021	Incumbent	1805	Independent	SAC
1		Thida Oo	also serves as Attornery General				

=== Deputy ministers ===
	Name	Took office	Left office	Period	Party	Cabinet	Ref
1	San Lwin	30 August 2021	12 October 2022	1 year, 41 days	Independent	Min Aung Hlaing	
2	Dr Thein Lin Oo	3 August 2023	Present	3 years, 6 days	Independent	Min Aung Hlaing	

Note: Deputy Minister also serves as Deputy Union Attorney General of Myanmar
