= Min Thu (politician) =

Burmese union minister

- မင်းသူ
- Min Thu in 2017

Union Minister of Union Government Office
- In office 29 November 2018 – 1 February 2021
- Deputy: Tin Myint
- Preceded by: Thaung Tun
- Succeeded by: Soe Htut

Deputy Minister of President Office
- In office 2016 December – 29 November 2018
- Minister: Aung San Suu Kyi

Personal details
- Born: November 8, 1956 (age 69) Taunggyi, Shan State
- Spouse: Lwin May Thein
- Children: 2
- Education: DSA

Military service
- Branch/service: Tatmadaw
- Rank: Colonel

Min Thu is a former union minister of Union Government Office of Myanmar. He also served as deputy minister of the president office under Aung San Suu Kyi.

== Early life and education ==
Myint Thu was born in Taunggyi, Shan State. He graduated from the 20th intake of Defence Services Academy, and received a bachelor's degree, and a master's degree in defence studies.

== Career ==
=== Tatmadaw and Air Bagan ===
After graduating from the DSA, he served in the military and eventually retired as deputy chief of staff at Myeik Air Force Base, later working for Air Bagan.

=== Government ===
In 2016, the NLD Government appointed him as a member of Naypyidaw Council. In December 2016, he became the deputy minister of president office under the union minister Aung San Suu Kyi.In November 2018, Myint Thu was appointed as union minister for Union Government Office Ministry.

In the aftermath of the 2021 Myanmar military coup, the Tatmadaw appointed Lieutenant General Soe Htut as Min Thu's successor as union government office minister on 1 February 2021.
