= Tun Shin =

Attorney General of Myanmar from 2011 to 2016

- ထွန်းရှင်

Union Attorney General of Myanmar
- In office 30 March 2011 – 30 March 2016
- Preceded by: U Aye Maung
- Succeeded by: Htun Htun Oo

Deputy Attorney General of Myanmar
- In office 2 February 2003 – 30 March 2011
- Preceded by: U Khin Maung Aye
- Succeeded by: U Han Shein

Personal details
- Born: 2 October 1948 (age 77) Burma
- Party: Union Solidarity and Development Party
- Occupation: Attorney

Tun Shin (Burmese: ထွန်းရှင်; born 2 October 1948) was Attorney General of Myanmar (Burma) from 2011 to 2016. He is an attorney by profession, with an LLB degree from Yangon, and a Master of Arts degree in business law from London. He is a Christian.
