= Lun Maung (brigadier general) =

Burmese military officer

Brigadier General Lun Maung (Burmese: လွန်းမောင်; ? – 20 February 2001) was a Burmese military officer who served as the minister of the Prime Minister's Office and later the minister of energy under the State Peace and Development Council (SPDC). He was killed in a helicopter crash in Kayin State in 2001, along with SPDC Secretary 2 Lieutenant General Tin Oo, and other high-ranking military officials.

In 1986–87, he served as a strategist with the rank of colonel in the 99th Light Infantry Division of the Myanmar Army under Major Win Zaw Nyunt. During the 1988 uprising, when the junta split the government into military regions, Lun Maung was promoted to commander of the Yangon Command. Lun Maung's son Soe Htut is a military general and minister.
