= Thida Oo =

Union Minister for Legal Affairs and Union Attorney-General

- သီတာဦး

Minister of Legal Affairs
- Incumbent
- Assumed office 30 August 2021
- President: Myint Swe
- Leader: Min Aung Hlaing
- Preceded by: Office established

Attorney General of Myanmar
- Incumbent
- Assumed office 1 February 2021
- Leader: Min Aung Hlaing
- Preceded by: Htun Htun Oo

Personal details
- Born: 27 November 1964 (age 61) Rangoon, Burma
- Children: Min Ye Myat Phone Khine
- Cabinet: Min Aung Hlaing's military cabinet

Thida Oo (Burmese: သီတာဦး, also spelt Thidar Oo; born 27 November 1964 in Rangoon, Burma) is the incumbent Minister of Legal Affairs and Union Attorney-General of Myanmar. She was appointed by the Burmese military on 2 February 2021, after the military staged the 2021 Myanmar coup d'état on the morning of 1 February 2021. She had previously served as the Office of the Attorney-General's permanent secretary.

== Personal life ==
Thida Oo has one son, Min Ye Myat Phone Khine, a medical doctor in Australia.

=== Sanctions ===
On 31 January 2022, the U.S. Department of the Treasury added Thida Oo's name to its Specially Designated Nationals (SDN) list. The UK and Canada joined the U.S. in imposing sanctions against Oo, in a "coordinated action against Myanmar military regime, targeting individuals responsible for undermining democracy and rule of law".
