= Ministry of the State Counsellor Office =

Burmese ministry-level body

Ministry of the State Counsellor's Office
- နိုင်ငံတော် အတိုင်ပင်ခံရုံးဝန်ကြီးဌာန

Ministry overview
- Formed: 17 May 2016
- Dissolved: February 22, 2021; 5 years ago
- Headquarters: Office No (20), Naypyidaw
- Ministry executive: State Counsellor
- Website: www.statecounsellor.gov.mm/en/

The Office of the State Counsellor of the Republic of the Union of Myanmar (Burmese: ပြည်ထောင်စုသမ္မတမြန်မာနိုင်ငံတော် နိုင်ငံတော်အတိုင်ပင်ခံရုံး) was a ministry-level body that serves the State Counsellor of Myanmar. The office was led by union minister Kyaw Tint Swe. It was dissolved on 22 February 2021 by the military junta government known as State Administration Council.

== Departments ==
- Union Minister Office
- Department of Union Peace Formation
- Department of Policy Affairs

== List of ministers ==
No.	Portrait	Name (Born–Died)	Term of office			Political party	Cabinet
No.	Portrait	Name (Born–Died)	Term start	Term end	Term in office	Political party	Cabinet
1		Kyaw Tint Swe	17 May 2016	1 February 2021	4 years, 260 days	Independent	Htin Kyaw's Cabinet; Win Myint's Cabinet
