= Ministry of International Cooperation (Myanmar) =

Government ministry of Myanmar

- အပြည်ပြည်ဆိုင်ရာပူးပေါင်းဆောင်ရွက်ရေးဝန်ကြီးဌာန
- State seal

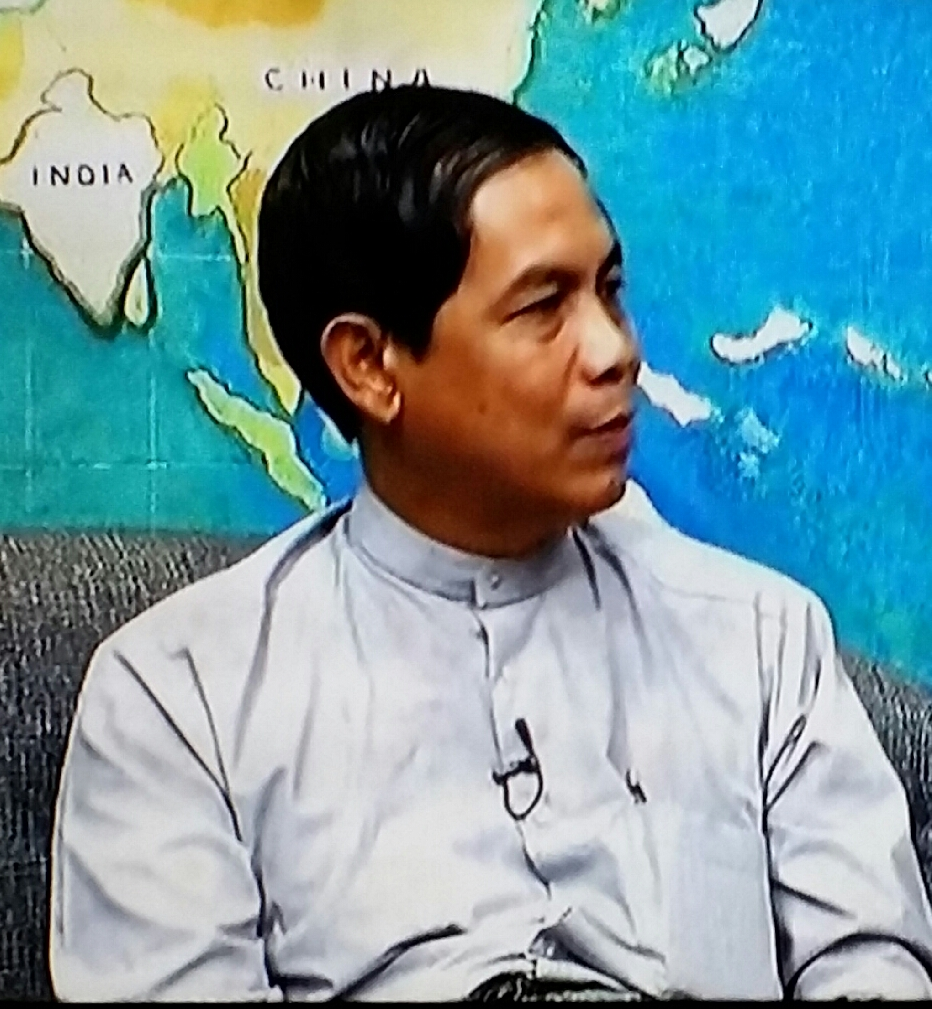
- Union Minister

Ministry overview
- Formed: November 24, 2017; 8 years ago
- Dissolved: August 3, 2023; 3 years ago
- Jurisdiction: Government of Myanmar
- Headquarters: Office No (9), Ministry of Foreign Affairs, Naypyitaw
- Minister responsible: Ko Ko Hlaing

The Ministry of International Cooperation was a ministry of Myanmar. It was one of the two foreign affairs ministries of Myanmar. The ministry was led by union minister Ko Ko Hlaing who was appointed by SAC Chairman Min Aung Hlaing.

The Ministry of International Cooperation's duties were absorbed by the Ministry of Foreign Affairs, meaning the Ministry of International Cooperation no longer exists.

== Formation ==
Htun Htun Oo, Union Attorney General, posted a bill from the president to the Pyidaungsu Hluttaw for the formation of two new ministries on 20 November 2017. Attorney General said Myanmar is actively involved in international affairs. In doing so, the new Union Ministry was formed to cooperate with the Ministry of Foreign Affairs in international relations and to have a ministry that would be accountable to the President from a political and economic perspective on international affairs. The union minister of Foreign Affairs Aung San Suu Kyi also holds the post, the State Counsellor, and can't attend to some foreign ministers meetings. The newly formed minister will attend to foreign ministers meetings on behalf of Foreign Minister. Pyidaungsu Hluttaw approved the formation and the president office formed the new ministry on 24 November 2017.

The ministry was formed by the staff of the International Organizations and Economic Department of the Ministry of Foreign Affairs. The minister office is even located at Office No (9), the Ministry of Foreign Affairs.

== Departments ==
- Union Minister Office

== List of union ministers ==
No.	Portrait	Name	Term of office			Political party	President	Deputy Minister
No.	Portrait	Name	Took office	Left office	Days	Political party	President	Deputy Minister
1		Kyaw Tin	23 November 2017	1 February 2021	1166		Htin Kyaw; Win Myint	Hau Do Suan
1		Kyaw Tin	former deputy minister of Foreign Affairs					
2		Ko Ko Hlaing	1 February 2021		2117		Myint Swe (acting)	
