= Han Zaw =

Burmese politician

His Excellency Han Zaw
- ဟန်ဇော်

Minister of Construction
- In office 19 January 2016 – 1 February 2021
- President: Htin Kyaw; Win Myint
- Preceded by: Win Khaing

Personal details
- Born: February 25, 1946 (age 80) (Magway Region) Natmauk
- Spouse: Thwin Thwin Aye Hmi
- Children: Khine Wai Zaw, Lin Maung Zaw, May Thwin Zaw
- Parent(s): Myat Maung; Kyi Mya
- Education: M.Sc (Engg:)
- Alma mater: Moscow Automobile and Road Construction State Technical University
- Occupation: Engineer, Government Servant

Han Zaw (Burmese: ဟန်ဇော်; born 25 February 1946) is a Burmese engineer and Minister for Ministry of Construction (Myanmar) from January 2016 to February 2021.

== Early life and education ==
He was born in Natmauk, Magway Region on 25 February 1946. He graduated from Moscow Automobile and Road Construction State Technical University. His father, Mya Maung, is a second cousin of General Aung San.

== Career ==
He worked for Ministry of Construction (Myanmar) for many years up to the post of managing director of Public Works under Ministry of Construction and retired. After the resignation of electricity and energy minister, Pe Zin Htun, construction minister Win Khaing became minister for construction and minister for electricity and energy. On 19 January, President Htin Kyaw appointed Han Zaw as union minister for Ministry of Construction and Win Khaing as electricity and energy minister.

Before that he also served as chairman in Myanmar Engineering Society and still now he is a member of central executive member of Myanmar Engineering Society.
