= Kyaw Tin =

Burmese politician (born 1955)

- ကျော်တင်
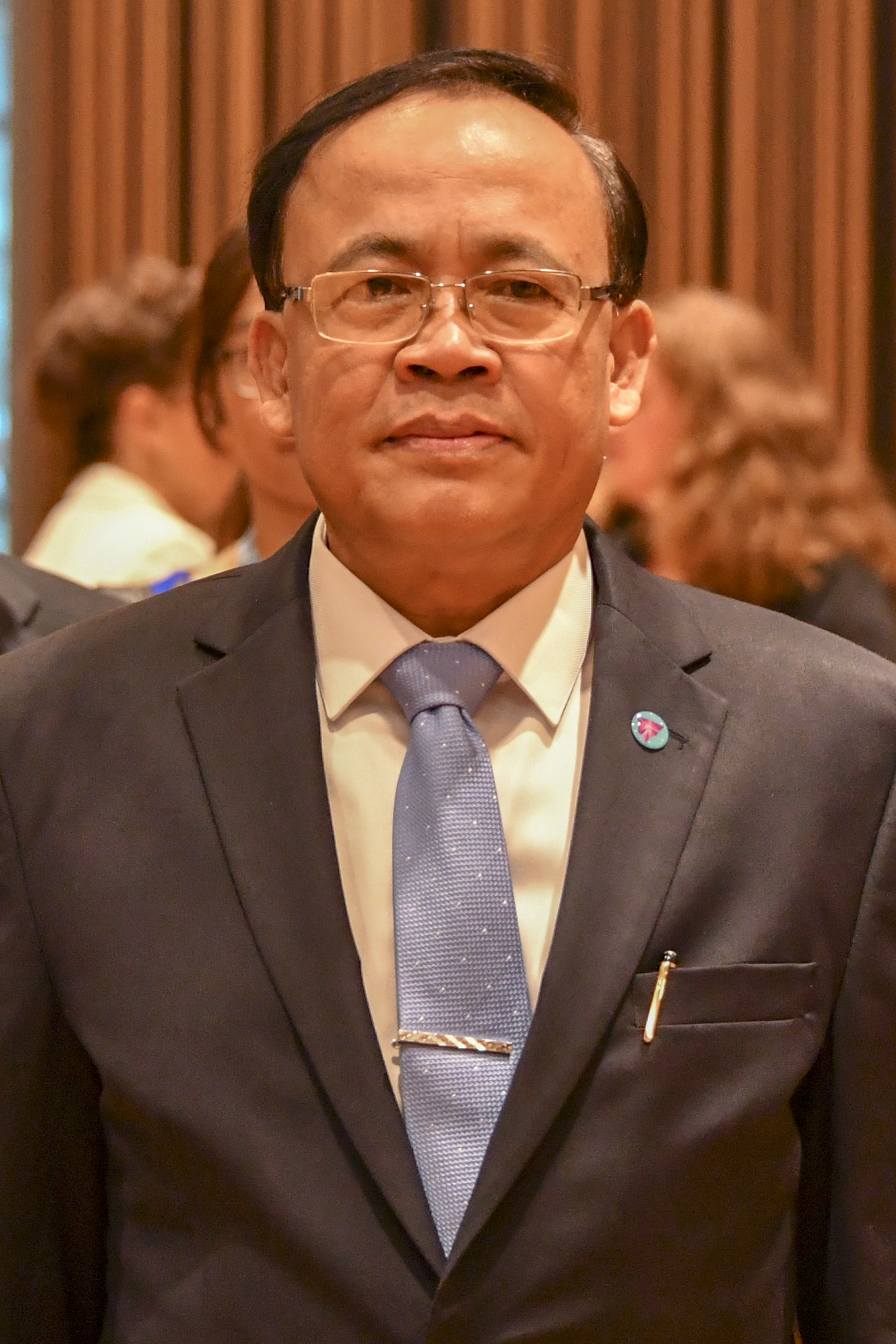
- Kyaw Tin in 2018

Union Minister of International Cooperation
- In office 23 November 2017 – 1 February 2021
- Deputy: Hau Do Suan (2020-2021)
- Preceded by: position established
- Succeeded by: Ko Ko Hlaing

Deputy Minister of Foreign Affairs
- In office 2016–2017
- Minister: Aung San Suu Kyi
- Preceded by: Tin Oo Lwin
- Succeeded by: Kyaw Myo Htut

Myanmar ambassador to Canada
- In office 19 April 2011 – 2013
- Minister: Wunna Maung Lwin
- Preceded by: Aye
- Succeeded by: Hau Do Suan

Personal details
- Born: October 31, 1955 (age 70) Wuntho, Sagaing Region
- Education: Yangon University; Dresden University of Technology

Kyaw Tin (Burmese: ကျော်တင်; born 31 October 1955) is former union minister for International Cooperation of Myanmar. He also served as deputy minister of Foreign Affairs under Aung San Suu Kyi. As of November 2021, Kyaw Tin continued to be recognized by ASEAN as Myanmar's foreign minister.

== Early life and education ==
Kyaw Tin was born on 31 October 1955 in Wuntho of Sagaing Division. He graduated with a master's degree with Mathematics from Yangon University and earned his post-graduate diploma in environmental management from Dresden University of Technology in Germany.

== Career ==
=== Foreign affairs ===
Kyaw Tin served in the foreign affairs services for approximately 30 years.

Year	Duty
1982-1983	Chancellor in Canberra
1983-1984	Deputy Assistant Director of the International Organizations Division
1984-1986	Third Secretary at the New York Permanent Mission
1986-1987	Deputy Assistant Director of International Organizations and Economic Department
1987-1991	Second Secretary at the Embassy in Bangkok
1991-1994	head of Branch 1 of the International Organizations and Economic Department
1994-1997	First Secretary/Second Secretary at Myanmar's Permanent Mission in Geneva
1997-1999	Assistance Director of the International Organizations and Economic Department
1999- 2001	Deputy Director of the International Organizations and Economic Department
2001-2003	Deputy Chief of Mission/Counsellor in Jakarta
2003-2005	Counsellor at the Permanent Mission in New York
2005-2006	Director of the South and West Asia Division, Political Department of MOFA
2007- 2008	Deputy Director-General of Political Department of MOFA
2008-2011	Director -General of Political Department of MOFA
2011-2013	Ambassador of Myanmar to Canada
2013- ??	Permanent Representative of Myanmar to the United Nations

=== Minister ===
Kyaw Tin became the deputy minister of Foreign Affairs under Aung San Suu Kyi.In April 2016, Aung San Suu Kyi hold the post, State Counsellor.So she can't attend to some foreign ministers meetings. Kyaw Tin attended to the Foreign Meetings as deputy minister of Foreign Affairs.In 2017, Htin Kyaw formed the new ministry, International Cooperation and appointed Kyaw Tin as union minister.Since then Kyaw Tin attended to foreign ministers meetings as minister of International Cooperation.

In the aftermath of the military-led 2021 Myanmar coup d'état, the Tatmadaw appointed Ko Ko Hlaing as Kyaw Tin's successor for International Cooperation minister on 1 February 2021.
