= Ohn Maung (minister) =

Burmese minister

His Excellency Ohn Maung
- အုန်းမော
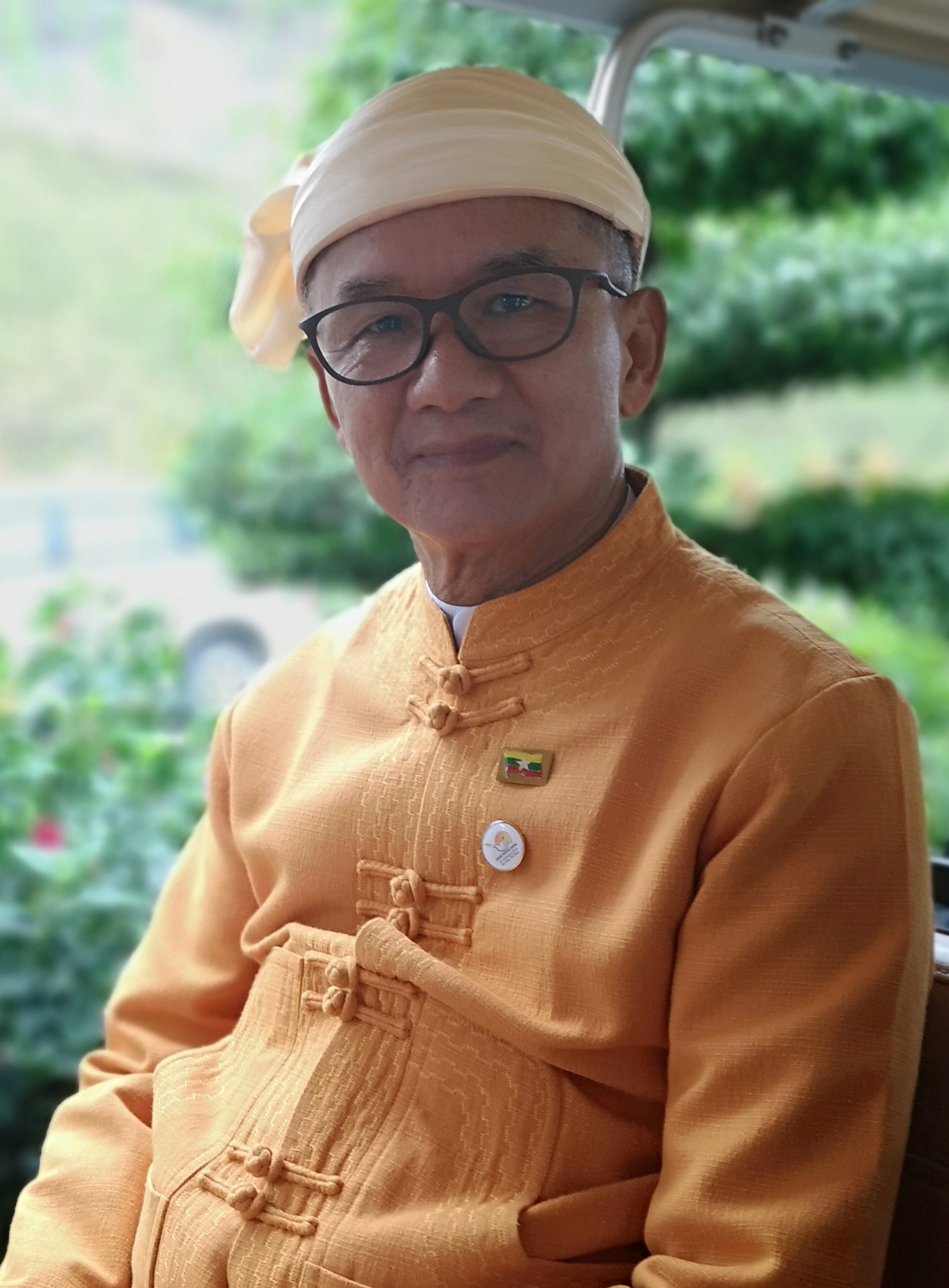
- Ohn Maung in 2019

Minister for Hotels and Tourism
- In office 30 March 2016 – 1 February 2021
- President: Htin Kyaw; Myint Swe (acting); Win Myint
- Preceded by: Htay Aung
- Succeeded by: Maung Maung Ohn

Personal details
- Born: 20 July 1947 (age 78) Nyaungshwe, Burma
- Citizenship: Myanmar
- Spouse: Khin Than Nwe
- Children: Yin Myo Su; Kyaw Zeya

Ohn Maung (Burmese: အုန်းမောင်; born 20 July 1947) is a Burmese politician and former Minister for Hotels and Tourism of Myanmar.

== Early life and education ==
Ohn Maung was born on 20 July 1947 in Nyaungshwe, Shan State, Burma (now Myanmar) to U Kywe and Mya Han. He is of Intha and Shan descent. He attended Taunggyi College until his second year of physics, when he dropped out.

== Career ==
In 1976, he opened the guest house Inlay Inn in Nyangshwe and then established Todi Inlay Travel Company in 1993. In subsequent decades he launched a number of successful hotels, including Inle Princess Resort.

In 1988, he was a leader of an anti-government movement during the 8888 Uprising and joined the NLD the following year as township chair. Then, in the 1990 Myanmar general election, he contested for Nyang Shwe Township and successfully won his seat, but was not allowed to assume his seat. In 1991, the military court sentenced him to 10 years in prison, but he was released in 1992 and turned his attention to the nascent tourism industry. He rejoined the National League for Democracy in 2012 and supported the party's victory in the 2015 election.

In the 2015 election, Ohn Win was named on the list of ministers submitted by President Htin Kyaw. Following his approval by the Parliament, he took office as Minister of Hotels and Tourism on 30 March 2016.

In the wake of the 2021 Myanmar coup d'état on 1 February, he was detained by the Myanmar Armed Forces. After being temporarily detained, he was released by the military council without any prosecution. After that, the military council also awarded him the title of Thiri Pyanchi, one of the country's highest honors.

== Personal life ==
He married Khin Than Nwe, and has two children, Yin Myo Su, a prominent businesswoman, and Kyaw Zeya.
