= Soe Htut =

Burmese politician

- စိုးထွဋ်
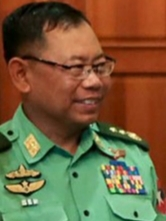
- Soe Htut in 2017

Union Minister at the Union Government Office 1
- In office 2 August 2023 – 25 September 2023
- President: Win Myint; Myint Swe (acting)
- Prime Minister: Min Aung Hlaing
- Preceded by: Kyaw Swe

Deputy Prime Minister of Myanmar
- In office 1 February 2023 – 25 September 2023
- President: Myint Swe (acting)
- Prime Minister: Min Aung Hlaing

Union Minister at the Union Government Office
- In office 2 February 2021 – 11 May 2021
- Deputy: Soe Tint Naing
- Preceded by: Min Thu
- Succeeded by: Yar Pyae

Union Minister for Home Affairs
- In office 10 February 2020 – 3 August 2023

Personal details
- Born: 29 March 1961 (age 65) Mandalay, Burma
- Spouse: Nilar Sein
- Children: Min Than Htut, Soe Min Htut, and Sithu Htut
- Parent: Lun Maung
- Education: Officers Training School, Bahtoo

Military service
- Branch/service: Myanmar Army
- Rank: Lieutenant General

Soe Htut (Burmese: စိုးထွဋ်; born 29 March 1961) is a former Burmese military officer and former Minister for Home Affairs of Myanmar. Soe Htut was a career soldier, and held the rank of Lieutenant General.

== Early life and education ==
Soe Htut was born to an army general, Brigadier General Lun Maung, and his wife Shwe Thet, in Mandalay, Burma (now Myanmar). He graduated from the 64th intake of the Officers Training School, Bahtoo, and received a bachelor's degree in physics, and a master's degree in defence studies.

== Career ==
Soe Htut served as the commander of Division 88 in Magwe. He then became a regional commander in July 2010. He had served as the commander of Eastern Central Command. While he became a major general, he was serving as the commander of Central Command in Mandalay, in July 2015. He also served as the commander of the 101st Light Infantry Division in Pakokku.

In 2016, he was appointed Judge Advocate-General and promoted to lieutenant general. Soon after, he became the Chief of Military Security Affairs. He was nominated as minister for Home Affairs by Myanmar's commander-in-chief, Min Aung Hlaing, and appointed in March 2020, replacing Lieutenant General Kyaw Swe. According to analysts, Kyaw Swe's close relationship with Aung San Suu Kyi may have prompted the ministerial replacement. Prior to this appointment, Soe Htut had been appointed as the head of Office of Military Security Affairs in 2016.

On 30 March 2021, he was appointed as a member of the State Administration Council, the military junta formed following the 2021 Myanmar coup d'état.

In August 2023, he was replaced by Yar Pyae as the minister for home affairs.

Soe Htut was placed on medical leave after corruption allegations against him emerged in September 2023. On 25 September, the military broadcaster Myawaddy TV announced he had returned to military duties, after being sacked from the State Administration Council. On November 10, he was convicted on corruption charges by a military court and imprisoned for five years.

== Controversies ==
In July 2020, Justice for Myanmar published an exposé revealing Soe Htut's conflicts of interest in several government contracts awarded in Pa’O Self-Administered Zone to H Double H, a construction and engineering firm owned by his three sons. Soe Htut has also courted controversy for being part of a committee to investigate the 2020 Hpakant jade mine disaster, despite also being one of the largest individual shareholders of Myanma Economic Holdings Limited, a military corporation with significant jade mining interests.

== Personal life ==
Soe Htut is married to Nila Sein. They have three sons, namely Min Than Htut, Soe Min Htut and Sithu Htut.
