= Kyaw Tint Swe =

Burmese politician

His Excellency Kyaw Tint Swe
- ကျော်တင့်ဆွေ
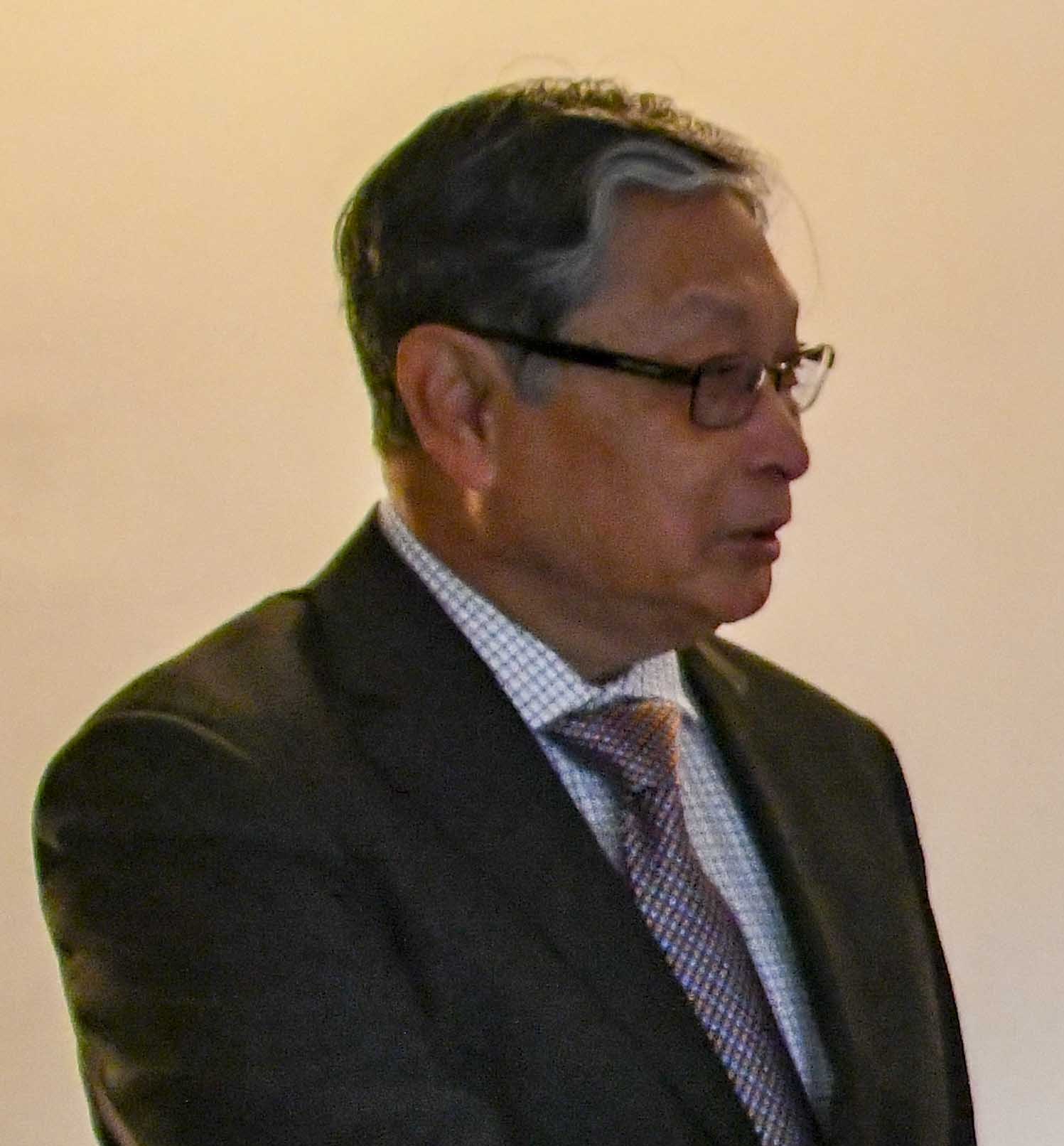
- Kyaw Tint Swe in 2018

Union Minister of the State Counsellor’s Office
- In office 17 May 2016 – 1 February 2021
- Preceded by: Position established
- Succeeded by: Position abolished

Myanmar Ambassador to United Nations
- In office 9 April 2001 – 2010

Director-General of International Organizations and Economic Department Ministry of Foreign Affairs (Myanmar)
- In office 1998–2001

Myanmar Ambassador to Japan
- In office 1994–1997

Personal details
- Born: 19 March 1945 (age 81)
- Party: Independent Politician
- Spouse: May Yin Tun
- Children: 2
- Education: Rangoon University; International Institute of Social Studies
- Profession: Diplomat, Politician

Kyaw Tint Swe (Burmese: ကျော်တင့်ဆွေ; born 19 March 1945) is a Burmese politician and former Minister for the Office of the State Counsellor of Myanmar.

== Career ==
Kyaw Tint Swe joined the Ministry of Foreign Affairs in 1968 and served in various positions in the embassies of Myanmar in Israel, Malaysia, Germany, Thailand and Japan. From 1990 to 1993, and from 1997 to 2001, he served as Secretary of Myanmar’s National Commission for Environmental Affairs. He also served as Chairman of the Senior Officials for the Environment for the Association of South-East Asian Nations (ASEAN),

From 2001 to 2010, he served as the Ambassador of Myanmar to the United Nations. He also served as Vice-Chairman of the Myanmar National Human Rights Commission from 2011 to 2013. In 2013, he worked closely with Aung San Suu Kyi on the Letpadaung Copper Mine Investigation Commission.
