= Ministry of Union Government Office (Myanmar) =

Government ministry of Myanmar

Ministry of Union Government Office ပြည်ထောင်စုအစိုးရအဖွဲ့ရုံး ဝန်ကြီးဌာန

Agency overview
- Formed: 24 November 2017
- Jurisdiction: Government of Myanmar
- Headquarters: Office 18, Naypyidaw
- Agency executives: Lieutenant General Yar Pyae, Union Minister, MUGO 1; Chit Naing, Union Minister, MUGO 2
- Website: official website

The Ministry of the Union Government Office (Burmese: ပြည်ထောင်စုအစိုးရအဖွဲ့ရုံး ဝန်ကြီးဌာန, MUGO) was a ministry-level body that served the Union Government of Myanmar between 2017 and 2021. In August 2021, the ministry was split into two: the Ministry of the Union Government 1 (MUGO 1), and the Ministry of the Union Government 2 (MUGO 2).

== History ==
The original MUGO was created in November 2017. Its original charter was to discharge the responsibilities of the office of the President and the Union Government.

On 28 December 2018, General Administration Department (GAD) was reorganized and reinvoked under the Ministry of the Office of the Union Government after being detached from the Ministry of Home Affairs. On 5 May 2021, the SAC reorganized the GAD under Ministry of Home Affairs.

On 1 August 2021, the State Administration Council split the MUGO into two ministries: MUGO 1 and MUGO 2.

== List of union ministers ==
No.	Portrait	Name	Term of office			Political party	President	Deputy Minister
No.	Portrait	Name	Took office	Left office	Days	Political party	President	Deputy Minister
1		Thaung Tun	23 November 2017	19 November 2018	361		Htin Kyaw; Win Myint	–
1		Thaung Tun	He was the National Security Advisor of Htin Kyaw's Cabinet.					
2		Min Thu	29 November 2018	1 February 2021	795	Union Solidarity and Development Party	Win Myint	Tin Myint
2		Min Thu	He was the deputy minister of the president office.					
3		Lieutenant General Soe Htut	1 February 2021	11 May 2021	99	Tatmadaw	Myint Swe (acting)	Major General Soe Tint Naing
3		Lieutenant General Soe Htut	He is also incumbent minister for Ministry of Home Affairs (Myanmar)					
4		Lieutenant General Yar Pyae	11 May 2021	Incumbent	2009	Tatmadaw	Myint Swe (acting)	

=== deputy ===
1. Tin Myint (2 January 2019 - 1 February 2021)
2. Major General Soe Tint Naing (2 February 2021 - 11 May 2021)
