= Htun Htun Oo (attorney-general) =

Burmese politician

His Excellency Htun Htun Oo
- ထွန်းထွန်းဦး

Union Attorney General of Myanmar
- In office 5 April 2016 – 2 February 2021
- President: Htin Kyaw; Myint Swe (acting); Win Myint
- Preceded by: Tun Shin
- Succeeded by: Dr Thida Oo

Deputy Attorney General of Myanmar

Personal details
- Born: Myanmar
- Occupation: Attorney

Htun Htun Oo (Burmese: ထွန်းထွန်းဦး; also spelt Tun Tun Oo) served as the Attorney General of Myanmar (Burma) until the 2021 Myanmar coup d'état. He previously served as Deputy Attorney General in President Thein Sein's Cabinet.

He also served as chairman to draft two of the four controversial bills designed to regulate religious conversion and population-control measures in Myanmar.
