= Attorney General of Myanmar =

Union Attorney General
- ပြည်ထောင်စုရှေ့နေချုပ်
- Incumbent; Dr Thida Oo since 2 February 2021
- Office of the Union Attorney General
- Nominator: President of Myanmar
- Inaugural holder: Chan Htoon
- Formation: 1948
- Deputy: Deputy Union Attorney General
- Website: www.oag.gov.mm

The Union Attorney General (Burmese: ပြည်ထောင်စုရှေ့နေချုပ်) is the Government of Myanmar's chief legal advisor, and also appears on behalf of the Burmese government in civil and criminal cases. The current Attorney General is Thida Oo who also serves as Union Minister for Legal Affairs.

== History ==
The Office of the Attorney General was established in 1948 under the 1947 Constitution of Myanmar and 1948 Attorney General of the Union Act. From 1974 through 1988, the post was called the Chairman of the Council of People's Attorney. The present law, the 2010 Attorney General of the Union Law was promulgated on 28 October 2010. The Union Attorney General is appointed by the President of Myanmar. The Union Attorney General leads the Office of the Union Attorney General in Naypyidaw. After the Provisional Government was formed in 2021, the Union Attorney General's Office was reorganized into a ministry on 30 August 2021 and Attorney General also serves as union minister of Legal Affairs.

== List of attorneys general of Myanmar ==
No.	Name	Took office	Left office
#	Chan Htoon	4 January 1948	30 June 1953
#	Chun Phoung (a) U Ohn Khin	1 July 1953	31 October 1953
#	Chan Tun Aung	1 November 1953	31 December 1953
#	Chan Htoon	1 January 1954	1 October 1954
#	Chan Tun Aung	2 October 1954	16 March 1955
#	Chun Phoung (a) U Ohn Khin	17 March 1955	28 February 1957
#	Ba Han	1 March 1957	28 October 1958
#	Ba Sein	29 October 1958	4 April 1960
#	Yan Aung	5 April 1960	21 March 1961
#	Ba Swe	1 April 1961	7 March 1962
#	Ba Sein	8 March 1962	25 September 1971
#	Hla Aung	25 September 1971	4 March 1974
#	Maung Maung Kyaw Win	4 March 1974	8 November 1981
#	Myint Maung	9 November 1981	26 July 1988
#	Maung Maung	27 July 1988	19 August 1988
#	Thaung Tin	19 August 1988	18 September 1988
#	Tha Tun	27 September 1988	9 May 2003
#	Aye Maung	22 July 2003	30 March 2011
#	Tun Shin	30 March 2011	30 March 2016
#	Htun Htun Oo	5 April 2016	2 February 2021
#	Dr Thida Oo	2 February 2021	present

== See also ==
- Cabinet of Myanmar
- Office of the Attorney General (Myanmar)
- Ministry of Legal Affairs (Myanmar)
