= List of companies of Myanmar =

Location of Myanmar

Myanmar is a sovereign state in South East Asia bordered by Bangladesh, India, China, Laos and Thailand. Myanmar is a country rich in jade and gems, oil, natural gas and other mineral resources. In 2013, its GDP (nominal) stood at US$56.7 billion and its GDP (PPP) at US$221.5 billion. The income gap in Myanmar is among the widest in the world, as a large proportion of the economy is controlled by supporters of the former military government.

== Notable firms ==
This list includes notable companies with primary headquarters located in the country. The industry and sector follow the Industry Classification Benchmark taxonomy. Organizations which have ceased operations are included and noted as defunct.

Notable companies Status: P=Private, S=State; A=Active, D=Defunct
| Name | Industry | Sector | Headquarters | Founded | Notes | Status | |
|---|---|---|---|---|---|---|---|
| Aeon Display and Security System | Consumer goods | Consumer electronics | Yangon | 2010 | Consumer electronics and security | P | A |
| Air Bagan | Consumer services | Airlines | Yangon | 2004 | Airline | P | A |
| Air Mandalay | Consumer services | Airlines | Yangon | 1994 | Airline | P | A |
| Asia World | Conglomerates | - | Yangon | 1992 | Industrials, consumer goods, retail | P | A |
| Eleven Media Group | Consumer services | Publishing | Yangon | 2000 | Publisher | P | A |
| Htoo Group of Companies | Conglomerates | - | Yangon | 1958 | Industrials, mining, consumer services | P | A |
| Myanma Economic Holdings Limited | Conglomerate | Multiple | Yangon | 1990 | Multiple | S | A |
| Myanma Gems Enterprise | Basic Materials | Precious Metals and Mining | Naypyidaw | 1976 | State gems | S | A |
| Myanma Oil and Gas Enterprise | Oil & gas | Exploration & production | Naypyidaw | 1963 | State petrochemical | S | A |
| Myanma Pharmaceutical Industry Enterprise | Health care | Pharmaceuticals | Yangon | 1957 | Pharmaceutical production | S | A |
| Myanma Timber Enterprise | Basic materials | Forestry | Yangon | 1948 | State logging | S | A |
| Myanmar Airways International | Consumer services | Airlines | Yangon | 1993 | Airline | P | A |
| Myanmar Distribution Group | Consumer goods | Nondurable household products | Yangon | 1996 | Consumer goods distributor | P | A |
| Myanmar Economic Corporation | Conglomerate | Multiple | Yangon | 1997 | Multiple | S | A |
| Myanmar National Airlines | Consumer services | Airlines | Yangon | 1948 | Airline | S | A |
| Myint & Associates | Industrials | Delivery services | Yangon | 1989 | Logistics | P | A |
| Myit Makha Media Group | Consumer services | Broadcasting & entertainment | Yangon | 2008 | Media | P | A |
| Mytel | Telecommunciations | Telecommunications Services | Yangon | 2017 | | P | A |
| Ooredoo | Telecommunciations | Telecommunications Services | Yangon | 2013 | | P | A |
| Telenor Myanmar | Telecommunciations | Telecommunications Services | Yangon | 2014 | 2022 | P | A |
| Myanma Posts and Telecommunications | Telecommunciations | Telecommunications Services | Yangon | 2017 | | S | A |
| ATOM Myanmar | Telecommunciations | Telecommunications Services | Yangon | 2022 | | P | A |
| Parrot Film Company | Consumer services | Media | Yangon | 1931 | Defunct 1957 | P | D |
| Red Link Communications | Telecommunications | Fixed line telecommunications | Yangon | 2008 | Telecom, internet | P | A |
| Shan Star | Consumer goods | Automobiles | Taunggyi | ? | Automotive | P | A |
| Wave Money | financial services | ? | Yangon | 2016 | mobile financial services provider | P | A |
| Yangon Airways | Consumer services | Airlines | Yangon | 1996 | Airline | P | A |

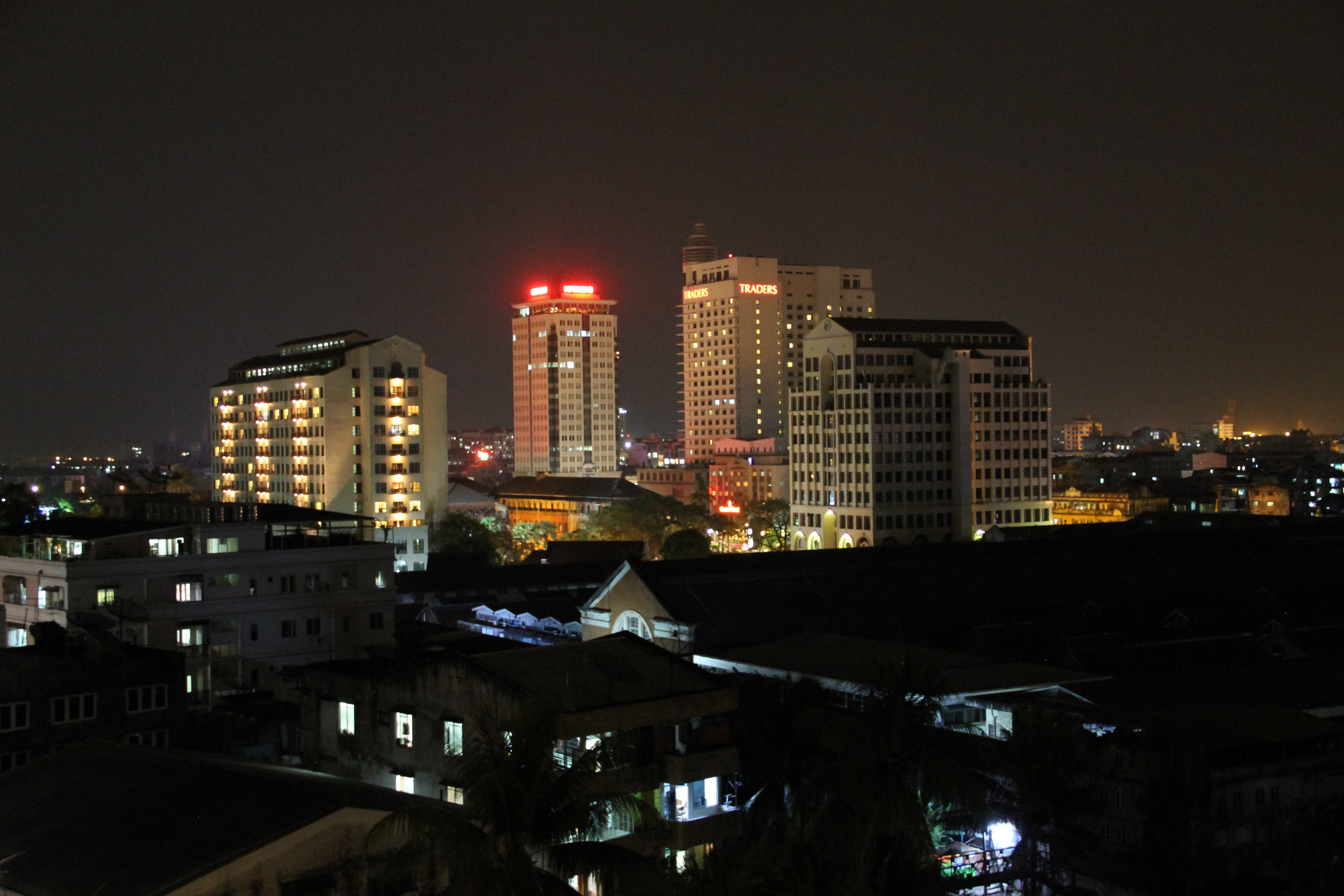
Sakura Tower in Yangon.

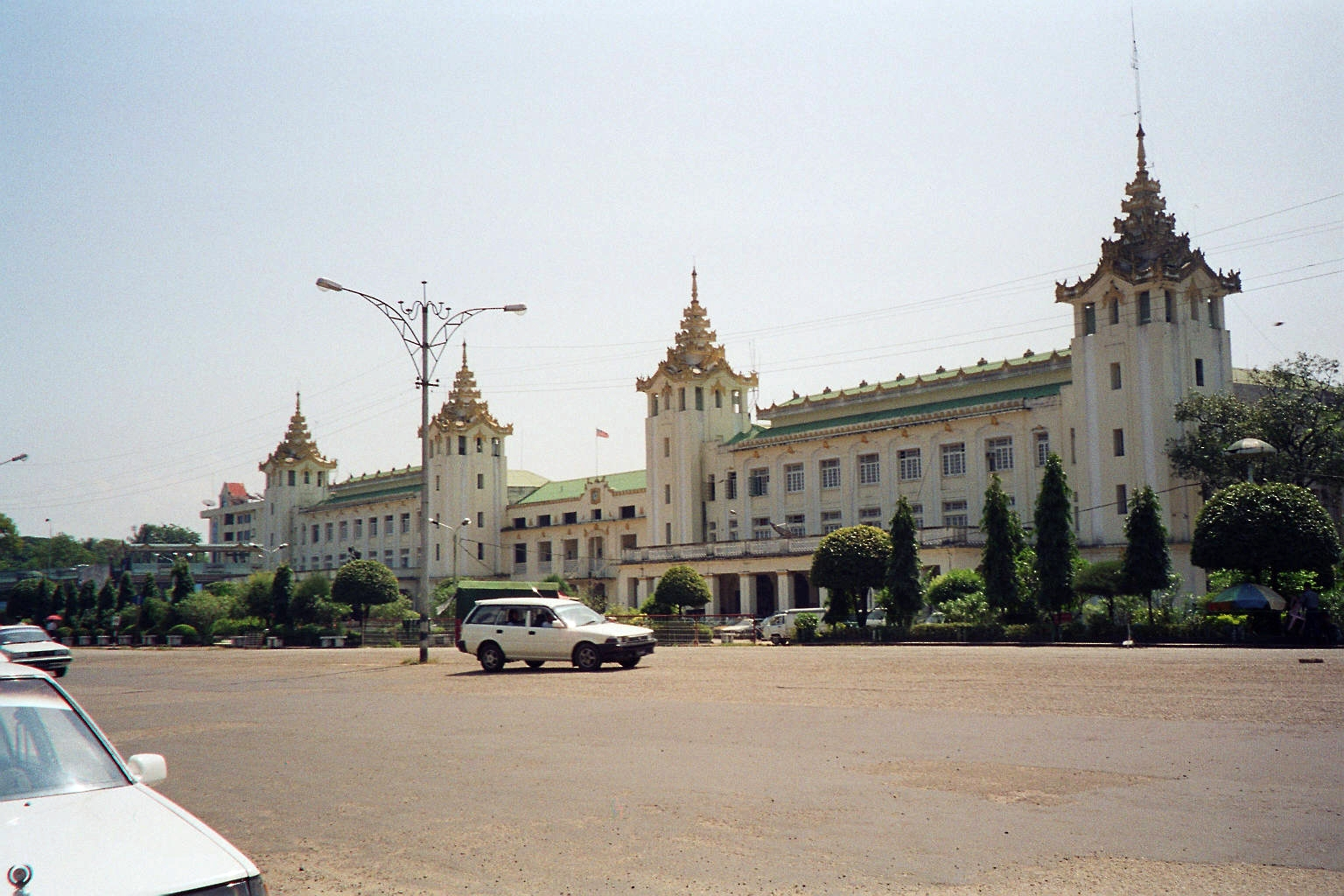
Yangon Central Railway Station.

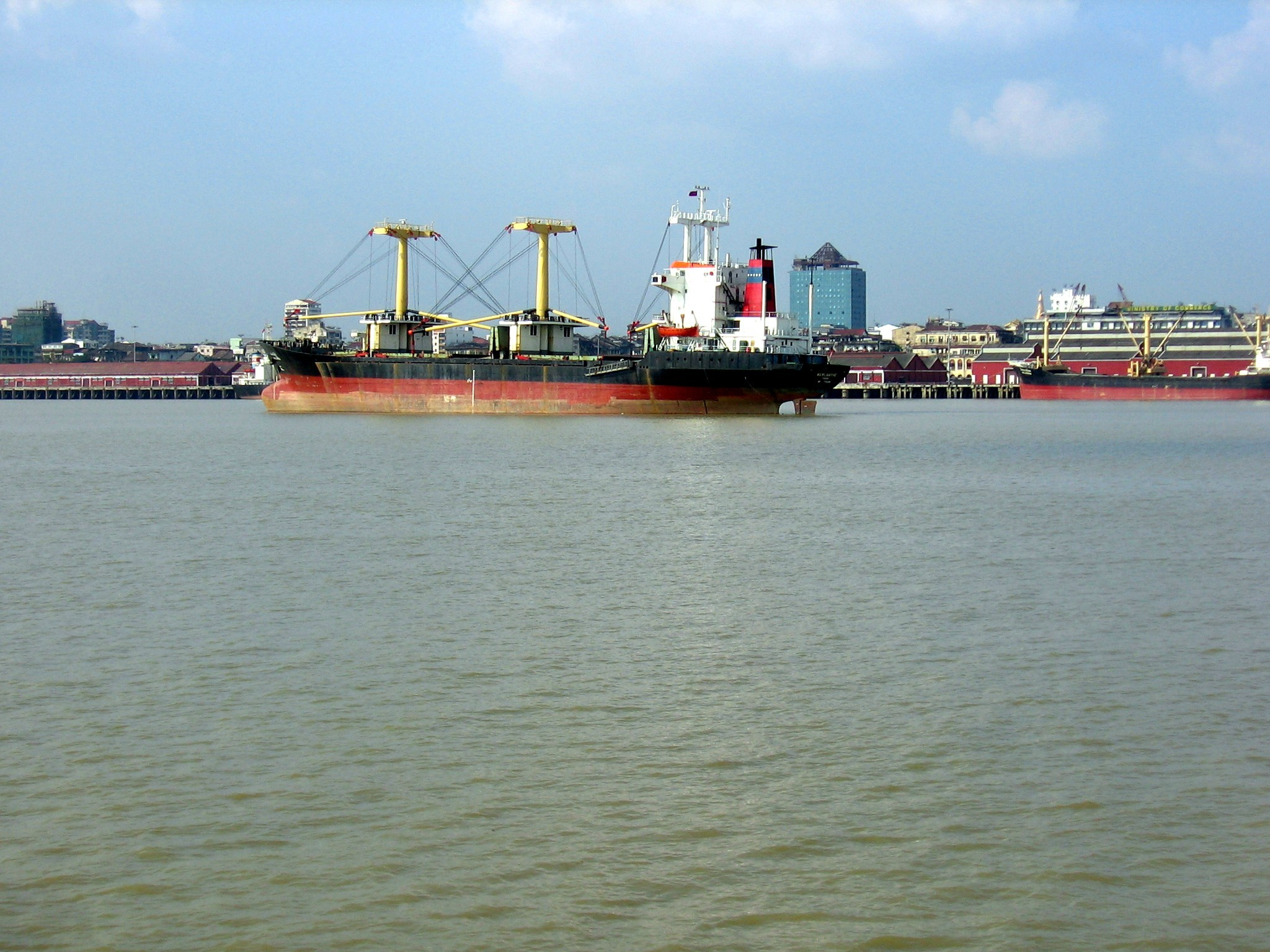
Cargo ships on the shores of Yangon River, just offshore of Downtown Yangon.

== See also ==
- List of airlines of Myanmar
- List of banks in Myanmar
