= Economy of Myanmar =

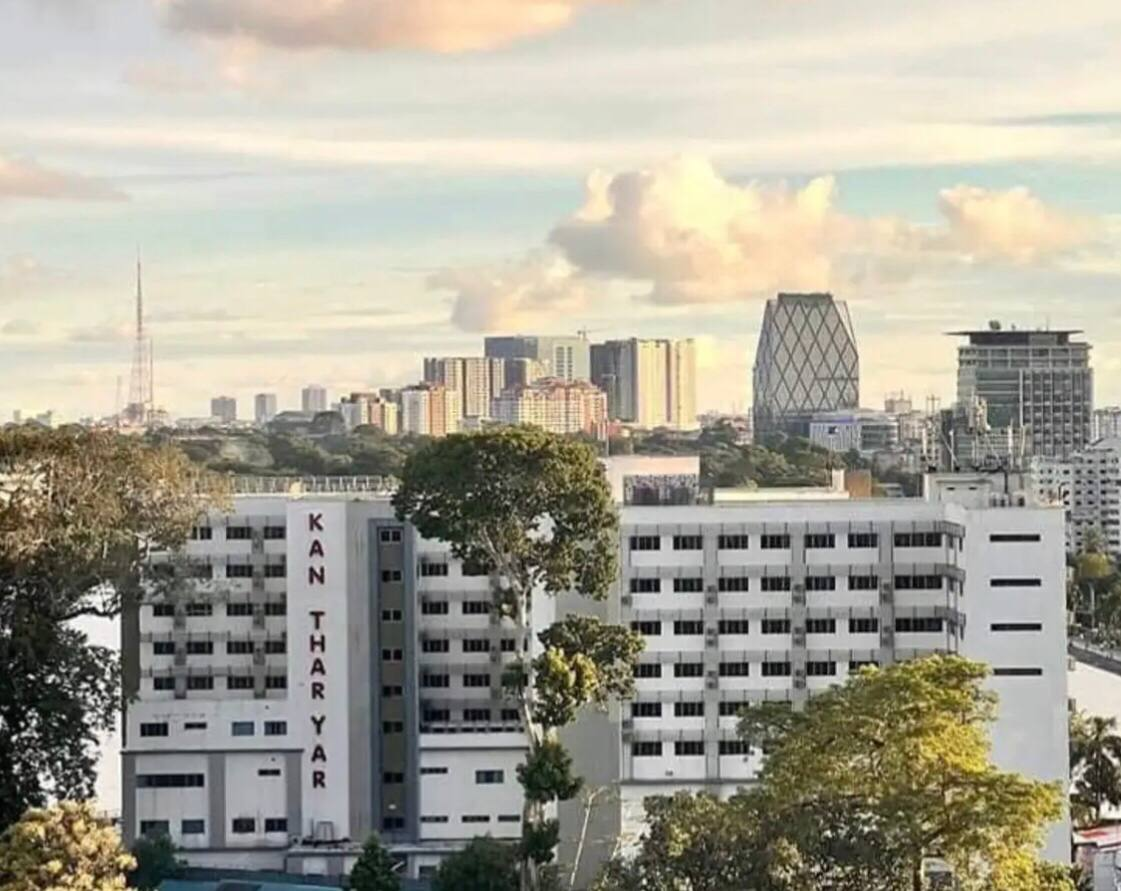
- Yangon, the financial centre of Myanmar
- Currency: Myanmar Kyat (MMK)
- Fiscal year: 1 October– 30 September
- Trade organisations: WTO, ASEAN, BIMSTEC, RCEP, G77, AFTA, ADB and others
- Country group: Least developed; Lower-middle income economy

Statistics
- Population: ▲54,617,807 (2024 est.)
- GDP: ▲$83.83 billion (nominal; 2026); ▲$293.31 billion (PPP; 2026)
- GDP rank: 84th (nominal; 2026); 71th (PPP; 2026)
- GDP growth: -2% (2025)
- GDP per capita: ▲$1,519 (nominal; 2026); ▲$5,168 (PPP; 2026)
- GDP per capita rank: 166th (nominal; 2026); 155th (PPP; 2026); (Note: Excluded territories)
- GDP per capita growth: -1.6% (2024)
- Human Development Index: ▲0.609 medium (2023) (150nd); ▲0.475 low IHDI (108th) (2021)
- All values, unless otherwise stated, are in US dollars.

Myanmar has a lower-middle income economy that is considered the seventh largest in Southeast Asia and among the world's least developed. After the return of civilian rule in 2011, the new government launched large-scale reforms, focused initially on the political system to restore peace and achieve national unity and moving quickly to an economic and social reform program. Myanmar has faced an economic crisis since the 2021 coup d'état. According to the International Monetary Fund (IMF), the nation generates $83.83 billion in nominal gross domestic product (GDP) and $293.91 by purchasing power parity (PPP), as of 2026. Myanmar's GDP per capita stands at $1,519.

== History ==
=== Classical era ===
Burma has been the main trade route between China and India since 100 BC. The Mon Kingdom of lower Burma served as an important trading centre in the Bay of Bengal. The majority of the population was involved in rice production and other forms of agriculture. Burma used silver as the trade currency. All land was nominally owned by the Burmese monarch. Exports, along with oil wells, gem mining and teak production were controlled by the monarch. Burma was vitally involved in the Indian Ocean trade. Logged teak was a prized export that was used in European shipbuilding because of its durability, and became the focal point of Burmese exports from the 1700s to the 1800s.

Under the monarchy, the economy of Myanmar had been based on communal redistribution known in Myanmar as Dāna. The state set the prices of the most important commodities. Agrarian self-sufficiency was vital, while trade was only of secondary importance.

=== British Burma (1885–1948) ===
Under the British administration, the people of Burma were at the bottom of the social hierarchy, with Europeans at the top, Indians, Chinese, and Christianized minorities in the middle, and Buddhist Burmese at the bottom. Integrated into the world economy by force, economic growth in Burma was driven by the extractive industries and cash crop agriculture, and the country had the second-highest GDP per capita in Southeast Asia. However, much of the wealth was concentrated in the hands of Europeans. The country became the world's largest exporter of rice, mainly to European markets, while other colonies like India suffered mass starvation. The British followed the ideologies of Social Darwinism and the free market, and opened up the country to a large-scale immigration with Rangoon exceeding New York City as the greatest immigration port in the world in the 1920s. Historian Thant Myint-U states, "This was out of a total population of only 13 million; it was equivalent to the United Kingdom today taking 2 million people a year." By then, in most of the largest cities in Burma, Rangoon, Akyab, Bassein and Moulmein, the Indian immigrants formed a majority of the population. The Burmese under British rule felt helpless, and reacted with a "racism that combined feelings of superiority and fear".

Crude oil production, an indigenous industry of Yenangyaung, was taken over by the British and put under Burmah Oil monopoly. British Burma began exporting crude oil in 1853. It produced 75% of the world's teak. The wealth was however, mainly concentrated in the hands of Europeans. In the 1930s, agricultural production fell dramatically as international rice prices declined and did not recover for several decades.

During the Japanese invasion of Burma in World War II, the British followed a scorched earth policy. They destroyed the major government buildings, oil wells, and mines for tungsten, tin, lead and silver to keep them from the Japanese. Myanmar was bombed extensively by the Allies. After independence, the country was in ruins, with its major infrastructure destroyed. With the loss of India, Burma lost relevance and obtained independence from the British. After a parliamentary government was formed in 1948, Prime Minister U Nu embarked upon a policy of nationalisation, and the state was declared the owner of all land. The government tried to implement an eight-year plan, partly financed by injecting money into the economy, which caused some inflation.

=== Post-independence and under U Nu and Ne Win (1948–1988) ===
After a parliamentary government was formed in 1948, Prime Minister U Nu embarked upon a policy of nationalisation. He attempted to make Burma a welfare state by adopting central planning measures. By the 1950s, rice exports had decreased by two-thirds and mineral exports by over 96%. Plans were implemented in setting up light consumer industries by private sector. The 1962 Burmese coup d'état was followed by an economic scheme called the Burmese Way to Socialism, a plan to nationalise all industries, with the exception of agriculture. The catastrophic program turned Burma into one of the world's most impoverished countries. Burma was classified as a least developed country by the United Nations in 1987.

=== Rule of the generals (1988–2011) ===
After 1988, the regime retreated from a command economy. It permitted modest expansion of the private sector, allowed some foreign investment, and received much needed foreign exchange. Than Shwe advocated for some deregulation economic policies, despite his relaxation of some restrictions on Burma's economy, his economic policies have been often criticized as ill-planned. Shwe relaxed some state control over the economy, and was a supporter of Burma's participation in the Association of South East Asian Nations (ASEAN). He also oversaw a large crackdown on corruption, which saw the sackings of a number of cabinet ministers and regional commanders in 1997. Shwe advocated for Crony capitalism. The economy was rated in 2009 as the least free in Asia (tied with North Korea). All basic market institutions are suppressed. Private enterprises were often co-owned or indirectly owned by state. The corruption watchdog organisation Transparency International in its 2007 Corruption Perceptions Index released on 26 September 2007 ranked Burma the most corrupt country in the world, tied with Somalia.

The national currency is the kyat. Burma currently has a dual exchange rate system similar to Cuba. The market rate was around two hundred times below the government-set rate in 2006. In 2011, the Burmese government enlisted the aid of the International Monetary Fund to evaluate options to reform the current exchange rate system, to stabilise the domestic foreign exchange trading market and reduce economic distortions. The dual exchange rate system allows for the government and state-owned enterprises to divert funds and revenues, while also giving the government more control over the local economy and making it possible to temporarily subdue inflation.

Inflation averaged 30.1% between 2005 and 2007. In April 2007, the National League for Democracy organised a two-day workshop on the economy. The workshop concluded that skyrocketing inflation was impeding economic growth. "Basic commodity prices have increased from 30% to 60% since the military regime promoted a pay rise for government workers in April 2006," said Soe Win, the moderator of the workshop. "Inflation is also correlated with corruption." Myint Thein, an NLD spokesperson, added: "Inflation is the critical source of the current economic crisis."

In recent years, China and India have attempted to strengthen ties with Myanmar for mutual benefit. The European Union and some nations, including the United States and Canada, imposed investment and trade sanctions on Burma. The United States banned all imports from Burma, though this restriction was lifted. Foreign investment comes primarily from China, Singapore, South Korea, India, and Thailand.

=== Economic liberalisation (2011–2019) ===
In 2011, when the new President Thein Sein's government came to power, Burma embarked on a major policy of reforms, including anti-corruption, currency exchange rate regulation, foreign investment laws and taxation. Foreign investments increased from US$300 million in 2009–10 to a US$20 billion in 2010–11 by about 6567%. Large inflow of capital results in stronger Burmese currency, kyat by about 25%. In response, the government relaxed import restrictions and abolished export taxes. Despite current currency problems, the Burmese economy is expected to grow by about 8.8% in 2011. After the completion of 58-billion dollar Dawei deep seaport, Burma is expected be at the hub of trade connecting Southeast Asia and the South China Sea, via the Andaman Sea, to the Indian Ocean receiving goods from countries in the Middle East, Europe and Africa, and spurring growth in the ASEAN region.

In 2012, the Asian Development Bank formally began re-engaging with the country, to finance infrastructure and development projects in the country. The $512 million loan is the first issued by the ADB to Myanmar in 30 years and will target banking services, ultimately leading to other major investments in road, energy, irrigation and education projects.

In March 2012, a draft foreign investment law emerged, the first in more than 2 decades. This law oversees the unprecedented liberalisation of the economy. It, for example, stipulates that foreigners no longer require a local partner to start a business in the country and can legally lease land. The draft law also stipulates that Burmese citizens must constitute at least 25% of the firm's skilled workforce, and with subsequent training, up to 50–75%.

On 28 January 2013, the government of Myanmar announced deals with international lenders to cancel or refinance nearly $6 billion of its debt, almost 60 per cent of what it owes to foreign lenders. Japan wrote off US$3 Billion, nations in the group of Paris Club wrote off US$2.2 Billion and Norway wrote off US$534 Million.

Myanmar's inward foreign direct investment has steadily increased since its reform. The country approved US$4.4 billion worth of investment projects between January and November 2014.

According to one report released on 30 May 2013, by the McKinsey Global Institute, Burma's future looks bright, with its economy expected to quadruple by 2030 if it invests in more high-tech industries. This however does assume that other factors (such as drug trade, the continuing war of the government with specific ethnic groups, etc.) do not interfere.

As of October 2017, less than 10% of Myanmar's population has a bank account. As of 2016–17 approximately 98 percent of the population has smartphones and mobile money schemes are being implemented without the use of banks similar to African countries.

=== Economic crisis (2020–present) ===
On April 30, 2021, the United Nations Development Programme published a report indicating that the COVID-19 pandemic and the 2021 Myanmar coup d'état in February 2021 could reverse economic gains made over the last sixteen years. Myanmar's economy has been in economic crisis since the coup d’état in 2021.

Since at least 2022, Myanmar is undergoing an ailing economy; the ruling military junta plans to shore up the worsening state of its balance of payments. When the kyat fell by a third of its pre-coup value, the central bank then sold $600 million worth of foreign reserves (10% of the entire country's total) to prop up the kyat. By April 2022, reserves dwindled, foreign investment fell and remittances plummeted. This led the junta to impose capital controls and import restrictions which led to shortages of diabetes and cancer medicines.

== Still unresolved internal problems ==
In a first-ever countrywide study in 2013, the Myanmar government found that 37 per cent of the population were unemployed and 26 per cent lived in poverty.

The current state of the Burmese economy has also had a significant impact on the people of Burma, as economic hardship results in extreme delays of marriage and family building. The average age of marriage in Burma is 27.5 for men, 26.4 for women, almost unparalleled in the region, with the exception of developed countries like Singapore.

Burma also has a low fertility rate of 2.07 children per woman (2010), especially as compared to other Southeast Asian countries of similar economic standing, like Cambodia (3.18) and Laos (4.41), representing a significant decline from 4.7 in 1983, despite the absence of a national population policy. This is at least partly attributed to the economic strain that additional children place on family income, and has resulted in the prevalence of illegal abortions in the country, as well as use of other forms of birth control.

The 2012 foreign investment law draft included a proposal to transform the Myanmar Investment Commission from a government-appointed body into an independent board. This could bring greater transparency to the process of issuing investment licenses, according to the proposed reforms drafted by experts and senior officials. However, even with this draft, it will still remain a question on whether corruption in the government can be addressed (links have been shown between certain key individuals inside the government and the drug trade, as well as many industries that use forced labour -for example the mining industry-).

Many regions (such as the Golden Triangle) remain off-limits for foreigners, and in some of these regions, the government is at war with the country's ethnic minorities and the opposition.

== Industries ==
The lack of an educated workforce skilled in modern technology contributes to the country's economic problems.

Lately, Myanmar lacks adequate infrastructure. Goods travel primarily across the Thai and Chinese borders and through the main port in Yangon.

Railroads are old and dilapidated, with few repairs since their construction under British rule in the late nineteenth century. Presently, China and Japan are providing aid to upgrade rail transport. Highways are normally paved, except in remote border regions. Energy shortages are common throughout the country including in Yangon. About 30 percent of the country's population does not have access to electricity, with 70 percent of people living in rural areas. The civilian government has indicated that electricity will be imported from Laos to fulfil demand.

Other industries include agricultural goods, textiles, wood products, construction materials, gems, metals, oil and natural gas.

The private sector dominates agriculture, light industry, and transport activities, while the government controls energy, heavy industry, and military industries.

=== Agriculture ===
The major agricultural product is rice which covers about 60% of the country's total cultivated land area. Rice accounts for 97% of total food grain production by weight. Through collaboration with the International Rice Research Institute (IRRI), 52 modern rice varieties were released in the country between 1966 and 1997, helping increase national rice production to 14 million tons in 1987 and to 19 million tons in 1996. By 1988, modern varieties were planted on half of the country's rice fields, including 98% of the irrigated areas. In 2011, Myanmar's total milled rice production accounted for 10.60 million tons, an increase from the 1.8 per cent back in 2010.

In northern Burma, opium bans have ended a century-old tradition of growing poppy. Between 20,000 and 30,000 ex-poppy farmers left the Kokang region as a result of the ban in 2002.

Rubber plantations are being promoted in areas of high elevation like Mong Mao. Sugar is grown in the lowlands such as Mong Pawk District.

=== Teak production ===
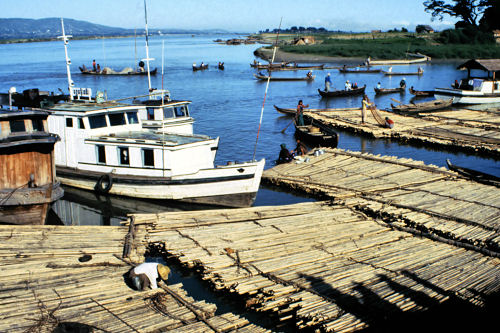
Rafted teak logs on the Irrawaddy River

Teak, tectona grandis, is a hardwood tree native to much of South and Southeast Asia, including Myanmar. Due to its natural water resistance, teak is sought out for a variety of uses including furniture-making and shipbuilding. Teak grows throughout much of Myanmar, but was first exploited in the Tenasserim (now Tanintharyi) region in the southeast of Burma on the Malay Peninsula. Though it has long been used by locals, teak has been important to the economy of Myanmar since British colonization.

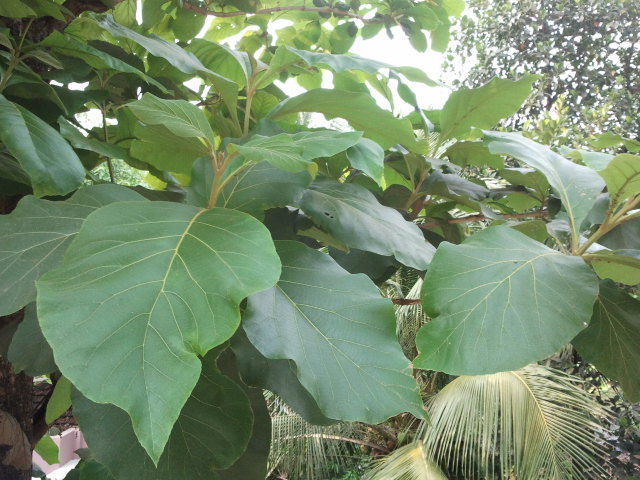
Leaves of Tectona grandis

=== Garment production ===
The garment industry is a major job creator in the Yangon area, with around 200,000 workers employed in total in mid-2015. The Myanmar Government has introduced a minimum wage of MMK 4,800 (US$3.18) per day for the garment workers from March 2018.

The Myanmar garments sector has seen a significant influx of foreign direct investment, if measured by the number of entries rather than their value. In March 2012, six of Thailand's largest garment manufacturers announced that they would move production to Myanmar, principally to the Yangon area, citing lower labour costs. In mid-2015, about 55% of officially registered garment firms in Myanmar were known to be fully or partly foreign-owned, with about 25% of the foreign firms from China and 17% from Hong Kong. Foreign-linked firms supply almost all garment exports, and these have risen rapidly in recent years, especially since EU sanctions were lifted in 2012. Myanmar exported $1.6 billion worth of garments and textiles in 2016.

=== Illegal drug trade ===
A world map of the world's primary opium or heroin producers. The Golden Triangle region, which Burma is part of, is pinpointed in this map.

Burma (Myanmar) is the largest producer of methamphetamines in the world, with the majority of ya ba found in Thailand produced in Burma, particularly in the Golden Triangle and Northeastern Shan State, which borders Thailand, Laos and China. Burmese-produced ya ba is typically trafficked to Thailand via Laos, before being transported through the northeastern Thai region of Isan.

In 2010, Burma trafficked 1 billion tablets to neighbouring Thailand. In 2009, the Chinese authorities seized over 40 million tablets that had been illegally trafficked from Burma. Ethnic militias and rebel groups (in particular the United Wa State Army) are responsible for much of this production; however, the Burmese military units are believed to be heavily involved in the trafficking of the drugs.

Burma is also the second largest supplier of opium (following Afghanistan) in the world, with 95% of opium grown in Shan State. Illegal narcotics have generated US$1 billion to 2 billion in exports annually, with estimates of 40% of the country's foreign exchange coming from drugs. Efforts to eradicate opium cultivation have pushed many ethnic rebel groups, including the United Wa State Army and the Kokang to diversify into methamphetamine production.

Prior to the 1980s, heroin was typically transported from Burma to Thailand, before being trafficked by sea to Hong Kong, which was and still remains the major transit point at which heroin enters the international market. Now, drug trafficking has shifted to southern China (from Yunnan, Guizhou, Guangxi, Guangdong) because of a growing market for drugs in China, before reaching Hong Kong.

The prominence of major drug traffickers has allowed them to penetrate other sectors of the Burmese economy, including the banking, airline, hotel and infrastructure industries. Their investment in infrastructure have allowed them to make more profits, facilitate drug trafficking and money laundering. The share of the informal economy in Myanmar is one of the largest in the world, which feeds into trade in illegal drugs.

=== Oil and gas ===
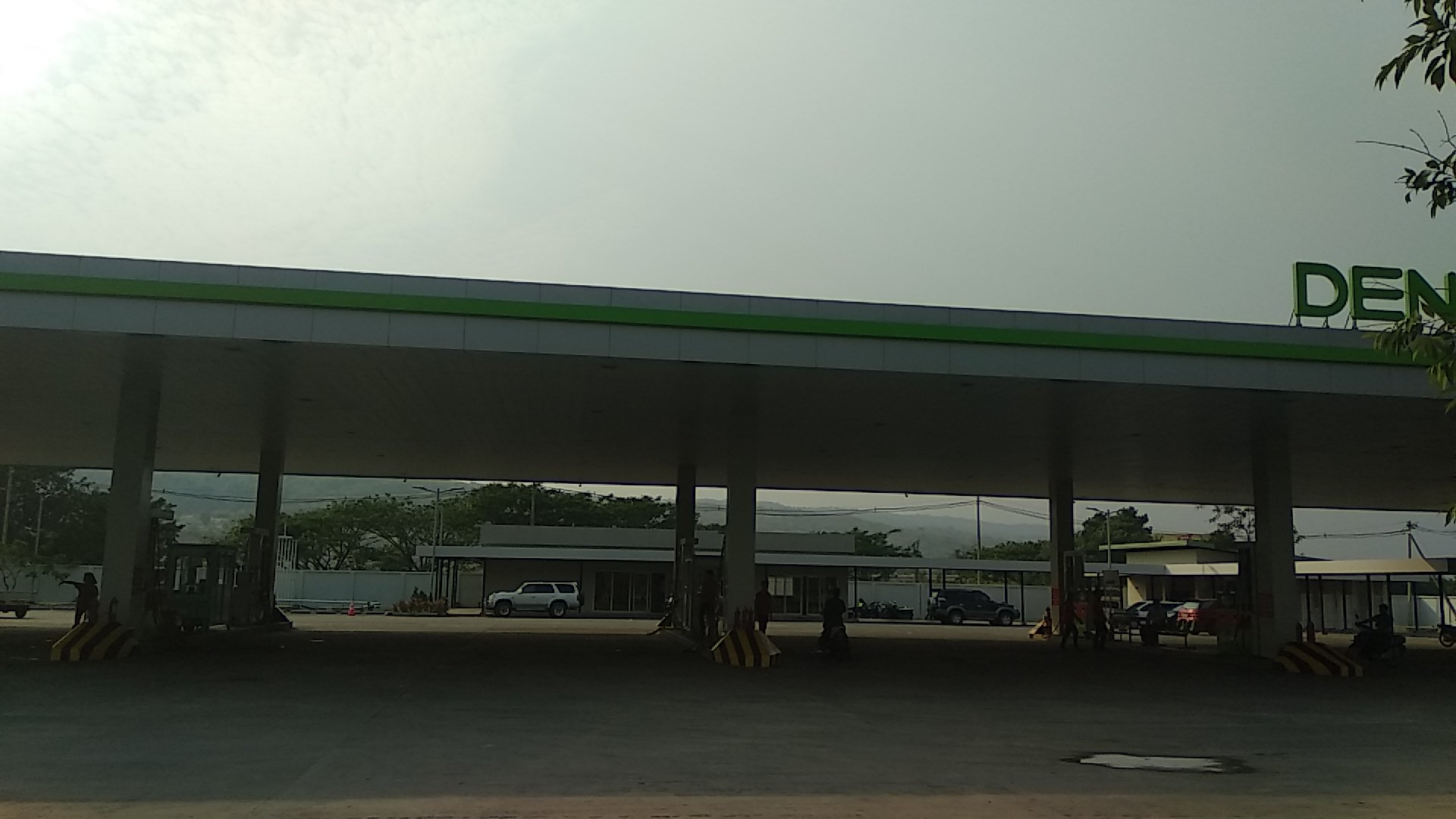
A petrol station in Naypyidaw

The Myanma Oil and Gas Enterprise (MOGE) is the national oil and gas company of Burma. The company is a sole operator of oil and gas exploration and production, as well as domestic gas transmission through a 1,900-kilometre (1,200 mi) onshore pipeline grid.

- The Yadana Project is a project to exploit the Yadana gas field in the Andaman Sea and to carry natural gas to Thailand through Myanmar.
- Sino-Burma pipelines refers to planned oil and natural gas pipelines linking Burma's deep-water port of Kyaukphyu (Sittwe) in the Bay of Bengal with Kunming in Yunnan province, China.
- The Norwegian company Seadrill owned by John Fredriksen is involved in offshore oil drilling, expected to give the Burmese government oil and oil export revenues.
- Myanmar exported $3.5 billion worth of gas, mostly to Thailand in the fiscal year up to March 2012.
- Initiation to bid on oil exploration licenses for 18 of Myanmar's onshore oil blocks has been released on 18 January 2013.

=== Energy ===
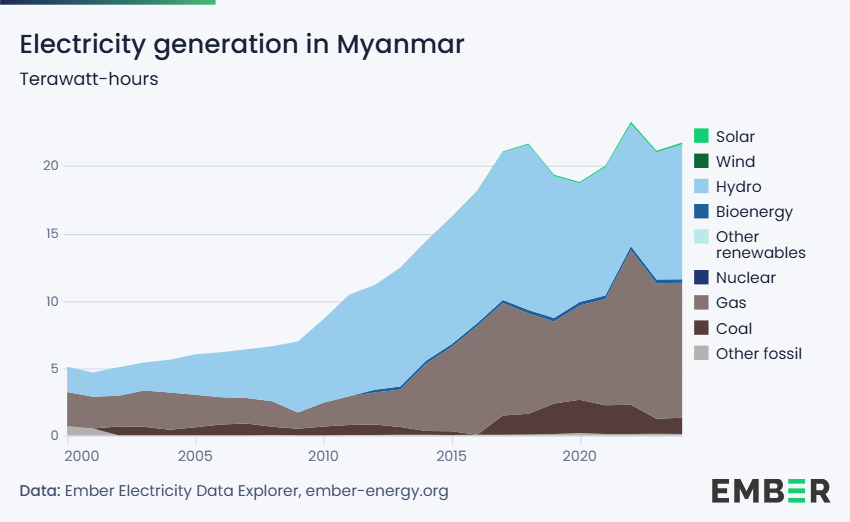
Electricity generation in Myanmar in terawatt-hours.

Myanmar has rich solar power and hydropower potential. The country's technical solar power potential is the greatest among the countries of the Greater Mekong Subregion. Wind energy, biogas and biomass have limited potential and are weakly developed.

Financing geothermal projects in Myanmar uses an estimated break-even power cost of 5.3–8.6 U.S cents/kWh, or in Myanmar Kyat 53–86K per kWh. This pegs a non-fluctuating $1=1000K, which is a main concern for power project funding. The main drawback with depreciation pressures is in the current FX market.

Between June 2012 and October 2015, the Myanmar Kyat depreciated by approximately 35%, from 850 to 1300 against the US Dollar. Local businesses with foreign-denominated loans from abroad suddenly found themselves rushing for a strategy to mitigate currency risks. Myanmar's current lack of available currency hedging solutions presents a real challenge for geothermal project financing.

=== Gemstones and metals mining ===
Myanmar's economy depends heavily on sales of precious stones such as sapphires, pearls and jade. Rubies are the biggest earner; 90% of the world's rubies come from the country, whose red stones are prized for their purity and hue. Thailand buys the majority of the country's gems. Burma's "Valley of Rubies", the mountainous Mogok area, 200 km (120 mi) north of Mandalay, is noted for its rare pigeon's blood rubies and blue sapphires. Burma's gemstone industry is a cornerstone of the Burmese economy with exports topping $1 billion.

In 2007, following the crackdown on pro-democracy protests in Myanmar, human rights organisations, gem dealers, and US First Lady Laura Bush called for a boycott of a Myanmar gem auction held twice yearly, arguing that the sale of the stones profited the dictatorial regime in that country. Debbie Stothard of the Alternative ASEAN Network on Burma stated that mining operators used drugs on employees to improve productivity, with needles shared, raising the risk of HIV infection. Richard W. Hughes, a Bangkok-based gemologist makes the point that for every ruby sold through the junta, another gem that supports subsistence mining is smuggled over the Thai border.

The Chinese have also been the chief driving force behind Burma's gem mining industry and jade exports. The industry is completely under Chinese hands at every level, from the financiers, concession operators, all the way to the retail merchants that own scores of newly opened gem markets. One Chinese-owned jeweller reportedly controls 100 gem mines and produces over 2,000 kilograms of raw rubies annually. Since the privatization of the gem industry during the 1990s, Burmese jewelers and entrepreneurs of Chinese ancestry have transformed Burma's gem industry into new retail jewelry shops, selling coveted pieces of expensive jewelry to customers mainly hailing from Hong Kong and Taiwan.

The permits for new gem mines in Mogoke, Mineshu and Nanyar state will be issued by the ministry according to a statement issued by the ministry on 11 February. While many sanctions placed on the former regime were eased or lifted in 2012, the US has left restrictions on importing rubies and jade from Myanmar intact. According to recent amendments to the new Myanmar foreign investment law, there is no longer a minimum capital requirement for investments, except in mining ventures, which require substantial proof of capital and must be documented through a domestic bank. Another important clarification in the investment law is the dropping of foreign ownership restrictions in joint ventures, except in restricted sectors, such as mining, where FDI will be capped at 80 per cent.

Myanmar is famed for its production of Golden South Sea Pearls. In recent years, the countries has auctioned its production in Hong Kong, first organized by Belpearl company in 2013 to critical acclaim and premium prices due to strong Chinese demand. Notable pearls include the New Dawn of Myanmar, a 19mm round golden pearl which sold to an anonymous buyer for undisclosed price.

=== Education ===
The educational system of Myanmar (also known as Burma) is operated by the Ministry of Education. Universities and professional institutes from Upper Burma and Lower Burma are run by two separate entities, each called the Department of Higher Education, with their headquarters in Yangon and Mandalay, respectively. The modern education system is based on the system implemented during British rule in Burma. The first government-run high school was founded by the British colonial administration in 1874. Two years later, this Government High School was upgraded as University College, Rangoon. Nearly all schools are government-operated, but recently, there has been an increase in privately funded schools (which specialise in English). In Myanmar, schooling is compulsory until the end of elementary school, about nine to ten years old. However, the international standard for schooling is 15 to 16 years old.

The literacy rate of Myanmar, according to the 2014 Myanmar Census stands at 89.5% (males: 92.6%, females: 86.9%). The annual budget allocated to education by the government is low; only about 1.2% is spent per year on education. English is taught as a second language from kindergarten. As of 2026, Myanmar's enrollment rate has dropped significantly, with only about half of school-age children attending school. With inflation and internal conflict, over 6 million children are not in school.

In pre-colonial Burma, the Sangha was the primary educational institution, was a widespread system of decentralised and local monastic schools, supported economically by local residents and politically by the king. Beginning in the mid-nineteenth century, there were also mission schools established by Catholic and Protestant orders, particularly in highland areas.

Most of the early British mission schools were established after 1860 (such as La Salle schools) in Myanmar were nationalised on 1 April 1965 after the order restoration of general Ne Win.

The Human Rights Measurement Initiative (HRMI) finds that Myanmar is fulfilling only 84.3% of what it should be fulfilling for the right to education based on the country's level of income. HRMI breaks down the right to education by looking at the rights to both primary education and secondary education. While taking into consideration Myanmar's income level, the nation is achieving 96.7% of what should be possible based on its resources (income) for primary education but only 71.9% for secondary education.

=== Healthcare ===
The current population of Myanmar is 67.05 million. It was 27.27 million in 1970. The general state of healthcare in Myanmar (also known as Burma) is poor. The military government of 1962-2011 spent anywhere from 0.5% to 3% of the country's GDP on healthcare. Healthcare in Myanmar is consistently ranked among the lowest in the world. In 2015, in congruence with a new democratic government, a series of healthcare reforms were enacted. In 2017, the reformed government spent 5.2% of GDP on healthcare expenditures. Health indicators have begun to improve as spending continues to increase. Patients continue to pay the majority of healthcare costs out of pocket. Although, out of pocket costs were reduced from 85% to 62% from 2014 to 2015. They continue to drop annually. The global average of healthcare costs paid out of pocket is 32%. Both public and private hospitals are understaffed due to a national shortage of doctors and nurses. Public hospitals lack many of the basic facilities and equipment. WHO consistently ranks Myanmar among the worst nations in healthcare.

As of 2020, Myanmar had a total population of over 54 million people. The increased population has brought with it a need for change and modernization within the healthcare sector. The administration of the healthcare system is distributed between the public and private sectors, in terms of finance and supply. Nevertheless, all administrative functions are ultimately overseen by the Ministry of Health (MoH).

The Ministry of Health is further divided into six departments which provide healthcare services to the entire population. Basic healthcare services and primary healthcare are catered to by the Department of Public Health. The Department of Medical Services oversees treatments and rehabilitation facilities, while the Department of Medical research conducts nation-wide surveys and research for medical development. The training of medical health professionals is the duty of the Department of Health Professional Resource Development (HPRD) and Management. Other areas within the ministry include the Department of Food and Drug Administration, and the Department of Traditional Medicine.

The Human Rights Measurement Initiative finds that Myanmar is fulfilling 81.5% of what it should be fulfilling for the right to health based on its level of income. When looking at the right to health with respect to children, Myanmar achieves 89.9% of what is expected based on its current income. In regards to the right to health amongst the adult population, the country achieves only 83.5% of what is expected based on the nation's level of income. Myanmar falls into the "very bad" category when evaluating the right to reproductive health because the nation is fulfilling only 71.2% of what the nation is expected to achieve based on the resources (income) it has available.

=== Tourism ===
Since 1992, the government has encouraged tourism. Until 2008, fewer than 750,000 tourists entered the country annually, but there has been substantial growth over the past years. In 2012, 1.06 million tourists visited the country, and 1.8 million are expected to visit by the end of 2013.

Tourism is a growing sector of the economy of Burma. Burma has diverse and varied tourist attractions and is served internationally by numerous airlines via direct flights. Domestic and foreign airlines also operate flights within the country. Cruise ships also dock at Yangon. Overland entry with a border pass is permitted at several border checkpoints. The government requires a valid passport with an entry visa for all tourists and business people. As of May 2010, foreign business visitors from any country can apply for a visa on arrival when passing through Yangon and Mandalay international airports without having to make any prior arrangements with travel agencies. Both the tourist visa and business visa are valid for 28 days, renewable for an additional 14 days for tourism and three months for business. Seeing Burma through a personal tour guide is popular. Travellers can hire guides through travel agencies.

Aung San Suu Kyi has requested that international tourists not visit Burma. Moreover, the junta's forced labour programmes were focused on tourist destinations; these designations have been heavily criticised for their human rights records. Even disregarding the obviously governmental fees, Burma's Minister of Hotels and Tourism Major-General Saw Lwin admitted that the government receives a significant percentage of the income of private sector tourism services. In addition, only a very small minority of impoverished people in Burma receive any money in relation to tourism.

Before 2012, much of the country was completely off-limits to tourists, and the military tightly controlled interactions between foreigners and the people of Burma. Locals were not allowed to discuss politics with foreigners, under penalty of imprisonment, and in 2001, the Myanmar Tourism Promotion Board issued an order for local officials to protect tourists and limit "unnecessary contact" between foreigners and ordinary Burmese people. Since 2012, Burma has opened up to more tourism and foreign capital, synonymous with the country's transition to democracy.

== Infrastructure ==
The Myanmar Infrastructure Summit 2018 noted that Myanmar has an urgent need to "close its infrastructure gap", with an anticipated expenditure of US$120 billion funding its infrastructural projects between now and 2030. More specifically, infrastructural development in Myanmar should address three major challenges over the upcoming years:

1. Road modernization and integration with neighboring roads and transportation networks
2. Development of regional airports and expansion of existing airport capacity
3. Maintenance and consolidation of urban transport infrastructure, through instalments of innovative transportation tools including but not limited to water-taxis and air-conditioned buses.

Myanmar needs to scale up its enabling infrastructure like transport, power supply and public utilities.

China's Belt and Road Initiative (BRI) infrastructure projects may affect 24 million people in Myanmar living in the BRI corridors, thus transforming the allocation of economic benefits and losses among economic actors in the country.

=== Transport ===
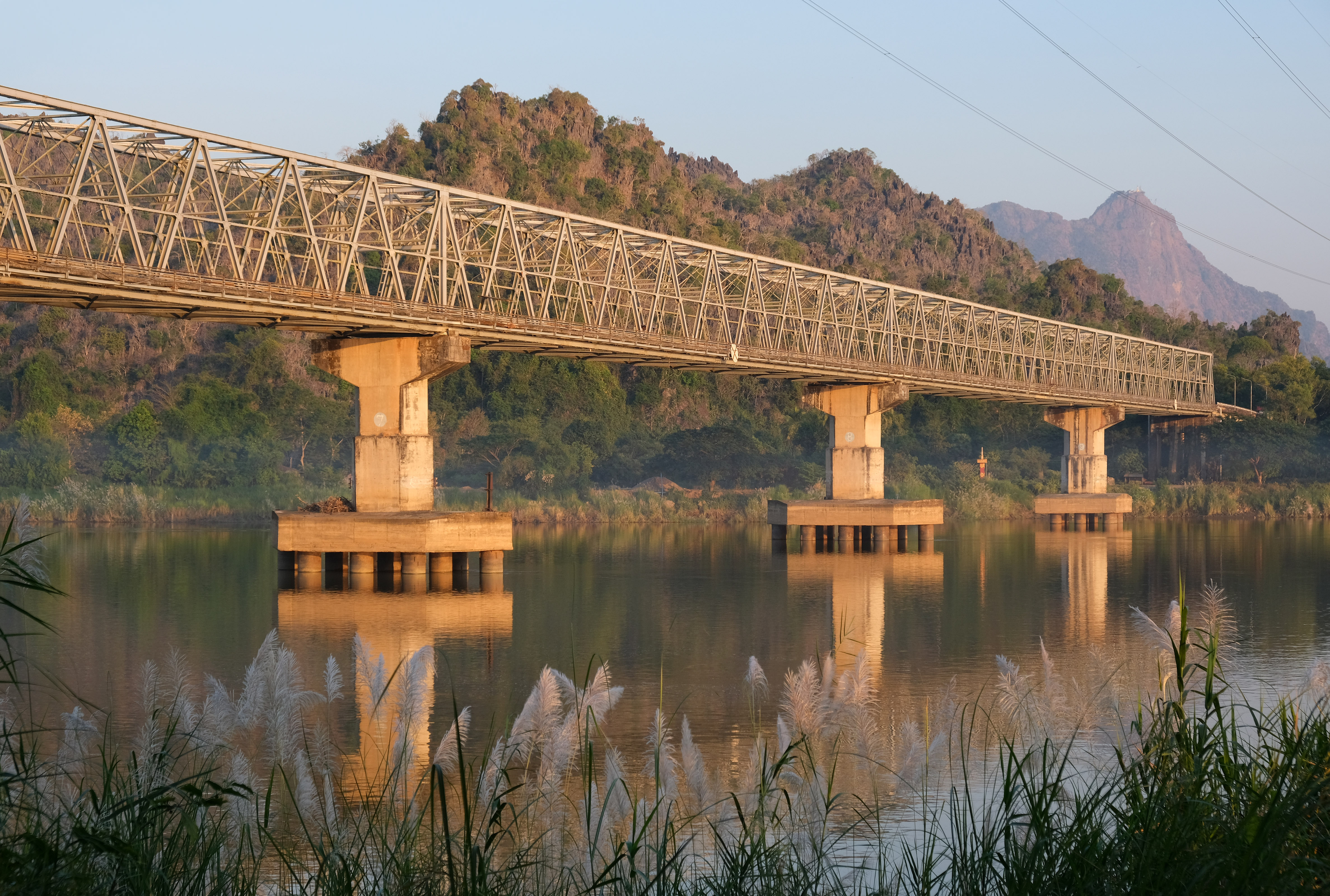
Thanlwin Bridge in Hpa An

Transport in Myanmar is characterised by a strong reliance on road transport for both passenger and freight movement. Other modes such as railways, inland waterways, and air transport play secondary roles.

=== Telecommunications ===
Myanmar began liberalisation of its telecommunications market in 2013.

== External trade ==
Exports of Myanmar by product category (2019) Chemical products Transportation Machines Mineral products Plastics and rubbers Metals Foodstuffs Precious metals Textiles Instruments Animal products Vegetable products Paper goods Footwear and headwear Miscellaneous Stone and glass Wood products Animal and vegetable bi-products Animal hides Arts and antiques Weapons

2006–2007 Financial Year Trade volumes (US$ millions)
Sr. No.	Description	Budget			Actual		
Sr. No.	Description	Exports	Imports	Total	Exports	Imports	Total
1	Normal Trade	4233.60	2468.40	6702.00	4585.47	2491.33	7076.80
2	Border Trade	814.00	466.00	1280.00	647.21	445.40	1092.61
	Total	5047.60	2934.40	7982.00	5232.68	2936.73	8169.41

Total Trade Values for successive years (US$ millions)
Financial Year	Exports	Imports	Total
2006–2007	5222.92	2928.39	8151.31
2007–2008	6413.29	3346.64	9759.93
2008–2009	6792.85	4563.16	11356.01
2009–2010	7568.62	4186.28	11754.90

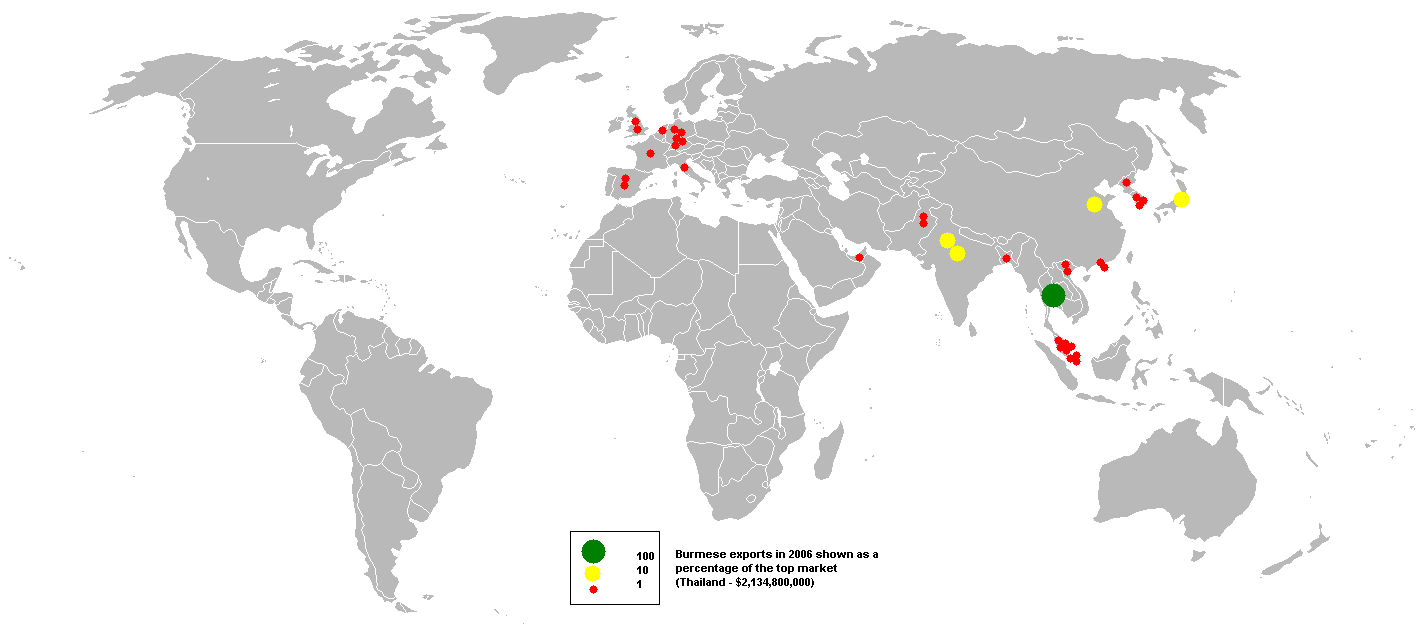
Burmese exports in 2006

== Macro-economic trends ==
This is a chart of trend of gross domestic product of Burma at market prices estimated by the International Monetary Fund and EconStats with figures in millions of Myanmar kyats.

Year	Gross Domestic Product	US dollar exchange	Inflation index (2000=100)
1965	7,627		
1970	10,437		
1975	23,477		
1980	38,608		
1985	55,988		
1990	151,941		
1995	604,728		

The following table shows the main economic indicators in 1999–2024. Inflation below 5% is in green.

Year	GDP (billion US$ PPP)	GDP per capita (US$ PPP)	GDP (billion US$ nominal)	GDP growth (real)	Inflation (%)	Government debt (% of GDP)
1999	32.59	725	6.04	▲8.4%	▲26.8%	▲155%
2000	▲37.47	▲822	▲7.26	▲12.4%	▲4.3%	▲169%
2001	▲43.09	▲934	▼6.69	▲12.5%	▲−19.8%	▲269%
2002	▲48.11	▲1,033	▼6.50	▲9.9%	▲21.9%	▼196%
2003	▲55.53	▲1,182	▲8.34	▲13.2%	▲47.5%	▼150%
2004	▲65.76	▲1,390	▲10.10	▲15.3%	▲8.0%	▼130%
2005	▲77.02	▲1,618	▲11.38	▲13.6%	▲6.9%	▼122%
2006	▲89.96	▲1,879	▲12.75	▲13.3%	▲16.6%	▼106%
2007	▲103.95	▲2,157	▲16.76	▲12.5%	▲34.4%	▼80%
2008	▲113.96	▲2,350	▲23.91	▲7.6%	▲20.9%	▼61%
2009	▲119.69	▲2,452	▲28.97	▲4.4%	▲3.7%	▼58%
2010	▲127.50	▲2,594	▲35.75	▲5.2%	▲5.9%	▼56%
2011	▲137.25	▲2,772	▲50.29	▲5.5%	▲6.8%	▼51%
2012	▲148.87	▲2,983	▲55.13	▲6.5%	▲0.4%	▼49%
2013	▲163.37	▲3,246	▲59.18	▲7.9%	▲6.4%	▼46%
2014	▲179.84	▲3,543	▲63.15	▲8.2%	▲5.7%	▼35%
2015	▲195.07	▲3,810	▼62.66	▲7.5%	▲7.3%	▲36%
2016	▲209.55	▲4,058	▼60.09	▲6.4%	▲9.1%	▲38%
2017	▲225.56	▲4,334	▲61.27	▲5.8%	▲4.6%	▲40%
2018	▲270.05	▲5,149	▲66.70	▲6.4%	▲5.9%	40%
2019	▲300.15	▲5,681	▲68.80	▲6.8%	▲8.6%	▼39%
2020	▲310.84	▲5,843	▲77.80	▼−1.2%	▲5.7%	▲41%
2021	▼251.02	▼4,688	▼68.05	▼−10.5%	▲3.6%	▲61%
2022	▲258.25	▲4,793	▼61.77	▼−4.0%	▲18.4%	▲62%
2023	▲274.34	▲5,061	▲64.51	▲2.5%	▲27.1%	▼60%
2024	▲283.75	▲5,206	▼64.28	▲1.0%	▲22.0%	▲61%

According to the CIA World Factbook,

Burma, a resource-rich country, suffers from pervasive government controls, inefficient economic policies, and rural poverty. The junta took steps in the early 1990s to liberalize the economy after decades of failure under the "Burmese Way to Socialism," but those efforts stalled, and some of the liberalization measures were rescinded. Burma does not have monetary or fiscal stability, so the economy suffers from serious macroeconomic imbalances – including inflation, multiple official exchange rates that overvalue the Burmese kyat, and a distorted interest rate regime. Most overseas development assistance ceased after the junta began to suppress the democracy movement in 1988 and subsequently refused to honor the results of the 1990 legislative elections. In response to the government of Burma's attack in May 2003 on Aung San Suu Kyi and her convoy, the US imposed new economic sanctions against Burma – including a ban on imports of Burmese products and a ban on provision of financial services by US persons. A poor investment climate further slowed the inflow of foreign exchange. The most productive sectors will continue to be in extractive industries, especially oil and gas, mining, and timber. Other areas, such as manufacturing and services, are struggling with inadequate infrastructure, unpredictable import/export policies, deteriorating health and education systems, and corruption. A major banking crisis in 2003 shuttered the country's 20 private banks and disrupted the economy. As of December 2005, the largest private banks operate under tight restrictions limiting the private sector's access to formal credit. Official statistics are inaccurate. Published statistics on foreign trade are greatly understated because of the size of the black market and unofficial border trade – often estimated to be as large as the official economy. Burma's trade with Thailand, China, and India is rising. Though the Burmese government has good economic relations with its neighbors, better investment and business climates and an improved political situation are needed to promote foreign investment, exports, and tourism.

The economy saw continuous real GDP growth of at least 5% from 2009 onwards.

== Foreign investment ==
Though foreign investment has been encouraged, it has so far met with only moderate success. The United States has placed trade sanctions on Burma. The European Union has placed embargoes on arms, non-humanitarian aid, visa bans on military regime leaders, and limited investment bans. Both the European Union and the US have placed sanctions on grounds of human rights violations in the country. Many nations in Asia, particularly India, Thailand and China have actively traded with Burma. However, on April 22, 2013, the EU suspended economic and political sanctions against Burma.

The public sector enterprises remain highly inefficient and also privatisation efforts have stalled. The estimates of Burmese foreign trade are highly ambiguous because of the great volume of black market trading. A major ongoing problem is the failure to achieve monetary and fiscal stability. One government initiative was to utilise Burma's large natural gas deposits. Currently, Burma has attracted investment from Thai, Malaysian, Filipino, Russian, Australian, Indian, and Singaporean companies. Trade with the US amounted to $243.56 million as of February 2013, accounting for 15 projects and just 0.58 per cent of the total, according to government statistics.

=== Asian investment ===
The Economist's special report on Burma points to increased economic activity resulting from Burma's political transformation and influx of foreign direct investment from Asian neighbours. Near the Mingaladon Industrial Park, for example, Japanese-owned factories have risen from the "debris" caused by "decades of sanctions and economic mismanagement." Japanese Prime Minister Shinzō Abe has identified Burma as an economically attractive market that will help stimulate the Japanese economy. Among its various enterprises, Japan is helping build the Thilawa Port, which is part of the Thilawa Special Economic Zone, and helping fix the electricity supply in Yangon.

Japan is not the largest investor in Myanmar. "Thailand, for instance, the second biggest investor in Myanmar after China, is forging ahead with a bigger version of Thilawa at Dawei, on Myanmar's Tenasserim Coast ... Thai rulers have for centuries been toying with the idea of building a canal across the Kra Isthmus, linking the Gulf of Thailand directly to the Andaman Sea and the Indian Ocean to avoid the journey round peninsular Malaysia through the Strait of Malacca." Dawei would give Thailand that connection.

=== Chinese investment ===
China, by far the biggest investor in Burma, has focused on constructing oil and gas pipelines that "crisscross the country, starting from a new terminus at Kyaukphyu, just below Sittwe, up to Mandalay and on to the Chinese border town of Ruili and then Kunming, the capital of Yunnan province". This would prevent China from "having to funnel oil from Africa and the Middle East through the bottleneck around Singapore".

Since the Myanmar's military junta took power as the State Peace and Development Council junta in 1988, the ties between China's People's Liberation Army and Myanmar's military forces developed and formalised key ties between the two states. China became Myanmar's key source of aid, loans and other financial assistance. China remained Myanmar's biggest foreign investor in 2013 even after the economy opened up to other providers like Japan and India. Chinese monetary assistance allowed China to gain structural power of Myanmar and a dominant position within the natural resource sector. During this period, an underdeveloped Burmese industrial sector was driven in part by Chinese investment and consumption of a few key extractive sectors such as mining, driving domestic production away from consumer goods sectors like textiles and electronics.

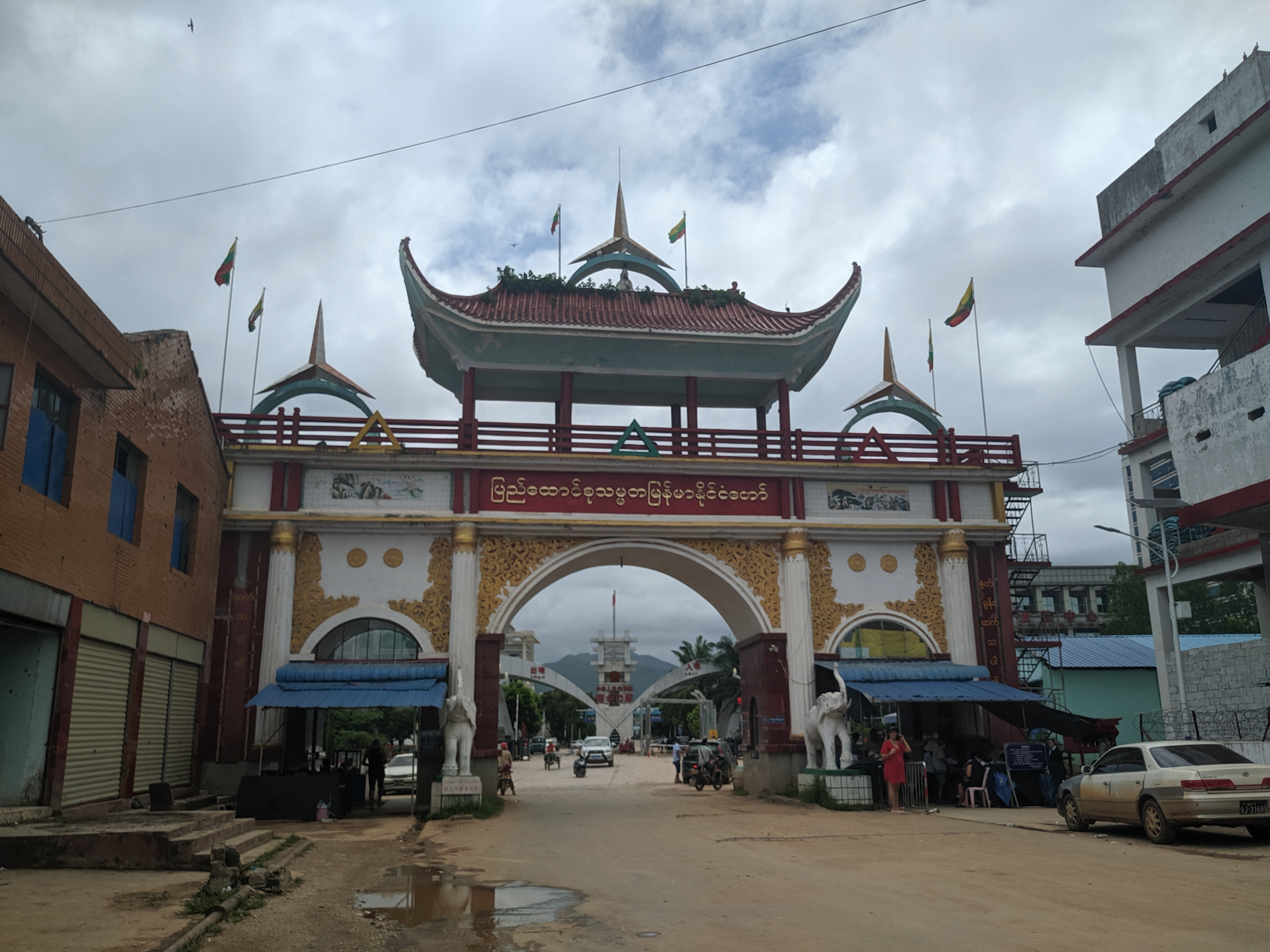
Yanlonkyine Gate on the Myanmar-China Border within Kokang Self-Administered Zone in 2019.

Legal two-way trade between Burma and mainland China reached US$1.5 billion annually by 1988, and additional Chinese trade, investment, economic, and military aid was sought to invigorate and jumpstart the re-emerging Burmese economy. An influx of foreign capital investment from mainland China, Germany, and France has led to the development of new potential construction projects across Burma. Many of these infrastructure projects are in the hands of Chinese construction contractors and civil engineers with various projects such as irrigation dams, highways, bridges, ground satellite stations, and an international airport for Mandalay. Burmese entrepreneurs of Chinese ancestry have also established numerous joint ventures and corporate partnerships with mainland Chinese State-owned enterprises to facilitate the construction of oil pipelines that potentially could create thousands of jobs throughout the country.

Private Chinese companies rely on the established overseas Chinese bamboo network as a conduit between mainland China and Burmese Chinese businesses to navigate the local economic landscape and facilitate trade between the two countries. Mainland China is now Burma's most important source of foreign goods and services as well as one of the most important sources of capital for foreign direct investment (FDI) in the country. In the fiscal year 2013, Chin accounted for 61 percent of all foreign direct investment. Between 2007 and 2015, Chinese FDI increased from US$775 million to US$21.867 billion, accounting for 40 percent of all FDI in the country. Much of this investment went into Burma's energy and mining industries. Chinese private firms account for 87% percent of total legal cross-border trade at Ruili and have a considerable amount of structural power over the illicit economy of Myanmar. Chinese structural power over Burma's structure of finance also allows China to maintain a dominant position within the country's natural resource sector, primarily Burma's latent oil, gas, and uranium sectors. China's position as the country's primary investor also allows it to be its largest consumer of its extractive industries. Many Chinese state-owned enterprises have set their sights on Burma's high-value natural resource industries such as raw jade stones, teak and timber, rice, and marine fisheries.

=== Foreign aid ===
The level of international aid to Burma ranks amongst the lowest in the world (and the lowest in the Southeast Asian region)—Burma receives $4 per capita in development assistance, as compared to the average of $42.30 per capita.

In April 2007, the US Government Accountability Office (GAO) identified the financial and other restrictions that the military government places on international humanitarian assistance in the Southeast Asian country. The GAO report, entitled "Assistance Programs Constrained in Burma," outlines the specific efforts of the Burmese government to hinder the humanitarian work of international organisations, including by restricting the free movement of international staff within the country. The report notes that the regime has tightened its control over assistance work since former Prime Minister Khin Nyunt was purged in October 2004.

Furthermore, the reports state that the military government passed guidelines in February 2006, which formalised Burma's restrictive policies. According to the report, the guidelines require that programs run by humanitarian groups "enhance and safeguard the national interest" and that international organisations coordinate with state agents and select their Burmese staff from government-prepared lists of individuals. United Nations officials have declared these restrictions unacceptable.

The shameful behavior of Burma's military regime in tying the hands of humanitarian organizations is laid out in these pages for all to see, and it must come to an end," said U.S. Representative Tom Lantos (D-CA). "In eastern Burma, where the military regime has burned or otherwise destroyed over 3,000 villages, humanitarian relief has been decimated. At least one million people have fled their homes, and many are simply being left to die in the jungle."

US Representative Ileana Ros-Lehtinen (R-FL) said that the report "underscores the need for democratic change in Burma, whose military regime arbitrarily arrests, tortures, rapes and executes its own people, ruthlessly persecutes ethnic minorities, and bizarrely builds itself a new capital city while failing to address the increasingly urgent challenges of refugee flows, illicit narcotics and human trafficking, and the spread of HIV/AIDS and other communicable diseases."

== Other statistics ==
Electricity – production: 17,866.99 GWh (2016 est.)

Electricity – consumption: 7,572.60 GWh Residential, 4,650.90 GWh Industrial, 3,023.27 GWh Commercial, 2,384.89 GWh Loss (2016 est.)

Electricity – exports: 2,381.34 kWh (2016)

Electricity – imports: 0 kWh (2006)

Agriculture – products: rice, pulses, beans, sesame, groundnuts, watermelon, avocado sugarcane, hardwood, fish and fish products

Currency: 1 kyat (K) = 100 pyas

Exchange rates: kyats per US dollar – 1,205 (2008 est.), 1,296 (2007), 1,280 (2006), 5.82 (2005), 5.7459 (2004), 6.0764 (2003) Note: unofficial exchange rates ranged in 2004 from 815 kyat/US dollar to nearly 970 kyat/US dollar, and by year-end 2005, the unofficial exchange rate was 1,075 kyat/US dollar; data shown for 2003–05 are official exchange rates

Foreign Direct Investment In the first eight months, Myanmar has received investment of US$5.7 billion. Singapore has remained the top source of foreign direct investments into Myanmar in the financial year of 2019-2020, with 20 Singapore-listed enterprises bringing in US$1.85 billion into Myanmar in the financial year 2019-2020. Hong Kong stood as the second-largest investor with an estimated capital of US$1.42 billion from 46 enterprises, followed by Japan investing $760 million in Myanmar.

Foreign Trade Total foreign trade reached over US$24.5 billion in the first eight months of the fiscal year (FY) 2019-2020.

Internet Usage In January 2024, there were 24.11 million internet users in Myanmar. This means 44.0% of the total population used the internet.

== See also ==
- List of companies of Myanmar
- Corruption in Myanmar
- Myanmar and the International Monetary Fund
- Myanmar and the World Bank
