= MPIE =

- Max Planck Institut für Eisenforschung, a German Research institute focussed on Iron and Steel research
- Myanma Pharmaceutical Industry Enterprise
- Meeting People Is Easy, a book
