= Economic liberalization in Myanmar =

The economic liberalization of Myanmar refers to the policy of liberalization orienting Myanmar laws toward an open market economy. This process was initiated following the coup d’état of the Burmese junta in 1988 in order to transform the underperforming Burmese economy.

== Historical context ==
Following the nation's decolonization in 1948, Burma showed a promising economic potential as the "rice mile" of Asia, becoming the worldwide number one exporter of rice from 1960 to 1963. In 1962, Burma became a socialist country and the economy collapsed under the rule of the Burma Socialist Programme Party, following the program of the Burmese Way to Socialism. The first liberalization reforms occurred in 1987 under the new presidency of San Yu. The full reorientation toward a market economy followed the instauration of the Burmese junta rule, after the coup d'état which established the State Law and Order Restoration Council.

== Liberalization reforms ==
There are two main patterns of the liberalization process. The first one, acted in September 1987, concerns the marketization and removal of restrictions in the sector of agriculture. From that point, individuals are free to grow any type of crop and export their agricultural production. Those laws are significant in a country where 70% of the population is rural and its livelihoods are consequently mainly related to agriculture. However, the liberalization was not complete since the rice market had been excluded from the reforms, and only experienced marketization during another liberalization in 2004.

The second one is the Foreign Investment Law of November 1988. This allows foreign investment in a company from joint venture participation with a minimum of 35% of foreign holdings to a full detention with 100% of foreign equity. In order to attract foreign capital, the law brings guarantees against the possibility of nationalization. It also ensures three years of tax exemption and the repatriation of profits.

== Impact of liberalization on economic activity and livelihood ==
The evaluation of the performance of the post-1988 Burmese economy is incomplete due to the lack of data released by the government and the absence or unreliability of official reports. Observation and analysis of liberalization policies on livelihood in Burma thus comes from the work of social scientists and journalists. The different reforms conducted tend to have boosted one economic sector which is the extraction of fossil fuels, mainly oil and gas. The opening to FDIs has given the opportunity to a range of foreign companies to initiate the exploitation of the rich natural resources of the Burmese soil. The rest of the economy is portrayed as having no real benefits from FDIs liberalization because of the high risks that represent the uncertainty of the Burmese economy to foreign investors.

=== Perceived progresses ===
The US embassy in Rangoon has reported that the living conditions of peasants have increased as a result of the liberalization since the late 1980s, with rise in the farm incomes and access to a range of technologies including generator power and diesel fueled irrigation pumps that can replace animal powered alternatives. Consequently, farmers do not need to secure food for their cattle and get less livelihood dependency on them (potential issues are feeding and treating animals).

Ikuko Okamoto analyses the effect of the second rice liberalization: "In the liberalization process... the private rice marketing sector was able to achieve self-sustaining development. The government’s policy to promote rice production and cut-backs in the volume of rice procurement increased the amount of rice sold in the market, which induced more traders to enter the rice-marketing business". Liberalization was thus beneficial for the expansion of a private market in which new kind of jobs such as rice traders, gave new opportunities and livelihoods characteristic of market economies, outside traditional agricultural production.

The liberalization also implied the freedom for farmers to crop what they want and consequently to practice multiple cropping, eventually being less reliant on the growth of only one crop and the variations in the market prices of those ones. Farmers are more likely to secure their income and consequently gain access to food and other basic necessities.

=== Critics of economic reforms results ===
The most frequently denounced collateral effect of liberalization on the livelihoods of Burmese people is the environmental degradation due to the multiplication of energy exploitation projects by foreign companies. A number of environmental issues critical to livelihoods are not tackled within the liberalization process. "Pressing environmental issues include public health, sanitation, clean drinking water, soil erosion, agricultural technological development, assessing the impact of importing foreign seeds and proper designs for irrigation projects". The construction of pipelines is denounced by NGOs as a threat to livelihoods throughout the destruction farming lands and fishing grounds, which can also be classified as restricted access zones. The simple consequence is the making of jobless populations in those areas where pipeline projects are pursued. The loss of farming land is not the only consequence: the example of construction of tourist resorts (tourism being the other activity expanding thanks to the FDIs reforms) destroying forests leaves no wood and bamboo to local population, making the construction of houses impossible.

The development of the energy industry requires the employment of skilled workers. Foreign companies exploiting Burmese gas thus tend to import their employed workforce. The Foreign Investment Law has been initially criticized for not prioritizing the human local development and employment enough. It does not bring a new alternative to the third of the rural population that does not possess lands to secure a subsistence production. The lack of FDIs in other industrial sectors also causes employment issues in urban areas.

The marketization of agriculture is portrayed as being beneficial mainly to large-scale exploitation involved in agribusiness, more than to small landowners relying to subsistence farming. Large exploitation establishments threaten local farmers through their cheap production capacity and do not provide landless people livelihood alternatives: the mechanization of large scale plantations implies a limited number of job opportunities, and consequently lowers wage rates of rural workers.

Khin Maung Kyi et al. have also argued that macroeconomic policies inappropriate to the process of liberalization have caused high inflation. The inflation rate between 1988 and 1996 is estimated at 1000%. The purchasing power has consequently gone down, making the ability of poor Burmese to secure access to food and other primary commodities weaker, despite their progress in securing incomes. The liberalization of the market also has a wrong impact on the ability of farmers to grow crops because the free market system implies an "increase in the prices of fertilizer and other agricultural inputs". The regularity of farming production is thus threatened.

Another point on which liberalization process in Burma has been denounced as misled is that it is incomplete. Market reforms often need to be tied to property law reforms. In Myanmar, despite liberalization, farmers are not protected from land confiscation when they are demarcated as wasteland, threatening the livelihood of subsistence farmers.

The study of living standards indicator in Myanmar can also suggest that over the time, the situation has not progressed. Both the Central Statical Organization (CSO) in 1999 and the IHLCA Project Technical Unit in 2010 state that one-quarter of Burmese households spend 70% of their income on food. Accessing food security is thus still a problem despite the liberalization efforts.

The liberalization impact can be summarized by Sean Turnell view, stating that the industries favored by the shift to market economy "create relatively few jobs and impose large environmental costs on the local population, so that they are doing little to create “the foundations for future growth”".

== See also ==
- Economy of Burma
- Politics of Burma
- History of Burma
- Agriculture in Burma
