= Myanmar and the International Monetary Fund =

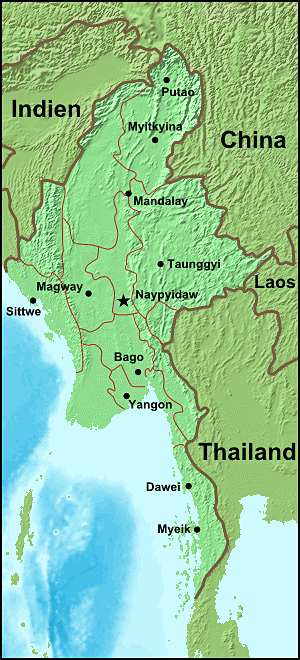
Map of Myanmar

Myanmar (officially known as the Republic of the Union of Myanmar, and also known as Burma), officially joined the International Monetary Fund (IMF) as of January 3, 1952; shortly before the end of term for the Union of Myanmar's first President, Sao Shwe Thaik, and the induction of Ba U. Since the induction of Myanmar as a member of the institution, they have made six arrangements with the IMF with its most recent arrangement made in 1981. As of 2019, they are currently led by Kyaw Kyaw Maung and Alternate U Soe Thein; their Special Drawing Rights (SDR) is at 0.79 million and quota consists of $516.8 million SDR which is 0.11% of the total IMF funds available. As of 2019, the country is under one of the twenty-four Executive Boards that facilitates the day-to-day operations of the IMF, led by Alisara Mahasandana and Alternate Keng Heng Tan; their co-board members consist of Brunei Darussalam, Cambodia, Republic of Fiji, Indonesia, Laos, Malaysia, Nepal, Philippines, Singapore, Thailand, Tonga, and Vietnam. The Executive Board accumulates around 218,545 total votes which account for 4.34% of the Fund's total, Myanmar allocates 6,633 of the votes (0.13% of the total votes in the IMF).

== Overview of Myanmar's Economy ==
Myanmar is a low-middle income economy that has seen significant improvements towards poverty reduction in the recent decades. Religious conflicts and natural disasters are rendered as political and geographical dangers towards the Myanma economy. According to the IMF, Myanmar's Gross Domestic Product (GDP) is at an estimated $355.609 billion with an estimated GDP per capita of $6,707.167 and an estimated inflation rate of 7.841%. Their projected real GDP changes at the rate of 6.2%. As of 2017, Myanmar has exported roughly $15 billion and imported $21.2 billion, leaving a negative trade balance of $6.14 billion. Their leading exports are petroleum gas while their significant imports are refined petroleum.

== IMF Arrangements ==
=== International Monetary Fund (IMF) ===
The International Monetary Fund (IMF) is a multilateral agency that ensures the stabilization of the international economy through economic surveillance, provide short-term loans whilst trying to correct inherent economic issues, and assist in modernizing economies to the 189 countries they are accountable for. The organization focuses their attention towards issues regarding balance of payments and economic crises that pose international consequences.

=== Involvement with Myanmar ===
Myanmar has had six arrangements with then Fund ever since its induction into the organization on January 3, 1952. Transactions were made with the IMF between 1984 and 1991, in which the outstanding credit has been consistently paid back; signifying that the IMF has considered the conditions of the state to refrain from imposing struggle. In 1995, Myanmar's external debt consisted mostly of bilateral debt with the remainder being private; the country was strongly advised to utilize Fund programs to alleviate debt.

Myanmar has joined the Chiang Mai Initiative Multilateralization with China, Hong Kong, Japan, South Korea, Indonesia, Thailand, Malaysia, Singapore, Philippines, Vietnam, Cambodia, Brunei, and Laos. It was a measure in response to the crisis of having insufficient foreign reserves to fulfill their short-term foreign currency obligations, with the intention to develop self-help mechanisms for East Asian countries to prevent the over-reliance on the IMF.

== IMF Consultation Post-Ratification of the 2008 Constitution ==
An oppressive collective of military leaders, military junta, took over the governing body of Myanmar from 1962 until 2011 and were often noted for its human rights violations. The ratification of the 2008 Constitution of Myanmar, was a long-awaited response from the military junta after their refusal to recognize the results of the 1990 General Elections and the house arrest of Aung San Suu Kyi. Under the new constitution, it is stated that the country is to practice a multi-party democratic system and a market economy system.

The development of a citizen-led democracy has brought economic reforms reintroducing Myanmar to the global economy and incentivizing international investors. The IMF acknowledged the fragility of the Myanmar government, aiding in the creation of reforms in taxation for medium-term solutions in the gradual strengthening of institutions through the concentration of large taxpayers. The IMF has also indicated that both constituents and political leaders have recognized the legitimacy of these reformations, but lack the modernization and risk management to face further economic challenges. Myanmar's 2018 Article IV consultation indicated the country's projected improvements to stagnate. Their banking sector has undergone restructuring, uncovering many fragile aspects of the banks; their four state-owned banks strengthened state sectors and large firms, allowing for private sector firms to procure a large market share of banking deposits (64%) and banking loans (82%). Inflated real estate values have also collateralized with lax lending standards intensifying risks created through a credit boom. The IMF's consultation concluded that the banking sectors absence towards recapitalization has exposed fragility in the sector through large-scale financial spillovers.

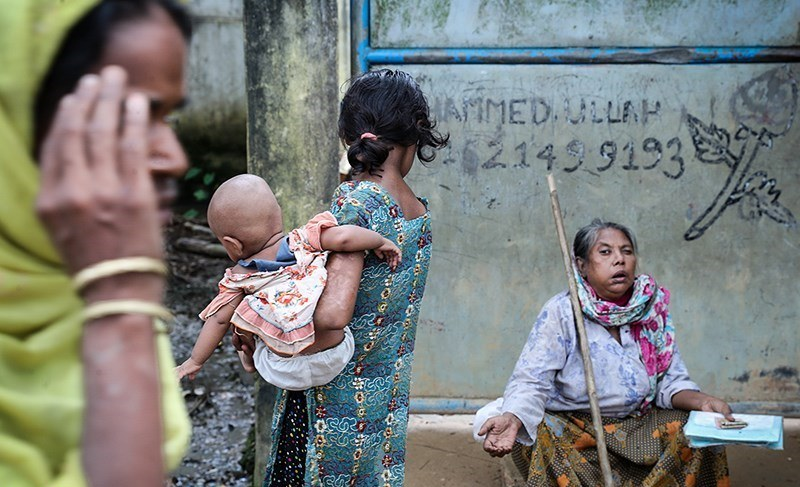
Displaced Rohingya Muslims

=== Rakhine State ===
The Rohingya people are an ethnic group established in the Rakhine State of Myanmar, their initial attempts for freedoms were largely defeated. Under the military junta, their political and civil rights slowly diminished and were often met with religious violence; ultimately rendering them stateless and forcing pilgrimage to Malaysia or Bangladesh. Local government has limited or restrained human rights investigators and humanitarian access, and constrained efforts through intensifying security tensions throughout the Rakhine area. The United Nations High Commissioner of Human Rights, Zeid Raad Al Hussein, has labelled the acts upon the Rohingya people "a textbook example of ethnic cleansing."

The IMF's consensus throughout the consultation held the humanitarian issues within the Rohingya conflict as a significant factor contributing to the stagnating growth of Myanmar's economic reforms. International actors have concentrated on the issue as a determining factor towards contributing to Myanmar's IMF financing and transition towards large-scale financial projects, although the IMF has viewed the country's progress in the conflict to have decreased significantly.
