= Aeon Display and Security System =

Burmese company

- Company type: Private
- Founded: 2010
- Headquarters: Yangon, Myanmar
- Area served: Myanmar

The Aeon Display and Security System is a Burmese company headquartered in Kamayut Township, Yangon. Aeon is a sole agent company of Samsung Techwin, a privately held Korean company. Aeon is mainly engaged in distributing display and security system from Samsung Techwin.

== History ==
Aeon is formed in late 2010 under supervision of Samsung Techwin. Aeon has engaged both private and government sectors in Myanmar since it was established. It was the first company to distribute non Chinese Made CCTVs in Burma and it is widely recognized for replacing Chinese CCTV and Security System brands in the country. It is the first company to distribute Large Format Display and Video Walls in Burma, Samsung LFDs can be found in shopping malls and government buildings in Myanmar.

== Products ==
- Surveillance: CCTV (Surveillance) Systems, modules, etc.
- Access Control
- Video Door Entry System
- Large Format Display

== See also ==
- Samsung Group
- Samsung Techwin
