= Myit Makha Media Group =

- Company type: Privately held company
- Industry: Media
- Founded: January 2008
- Headquarters: Kamayut Township, Yangon

The Myit Makha Media Group is an independent news agency in Myanmar. The company was formed in January 2008 and is based in Yangon. The chief editor is May Thingyan Hein, who received a 2007 Knight International Journalism Award.

== Services ==
Myitmakha provides daily news to television channels, radio channels and local journals. Myitmakha's webpage was created in August 2011 for Myanmar audiences abroad. News for international audiences was launched in the English language in June 2012.
