= Wave Money =

Mobile financial services provider in Myanmar

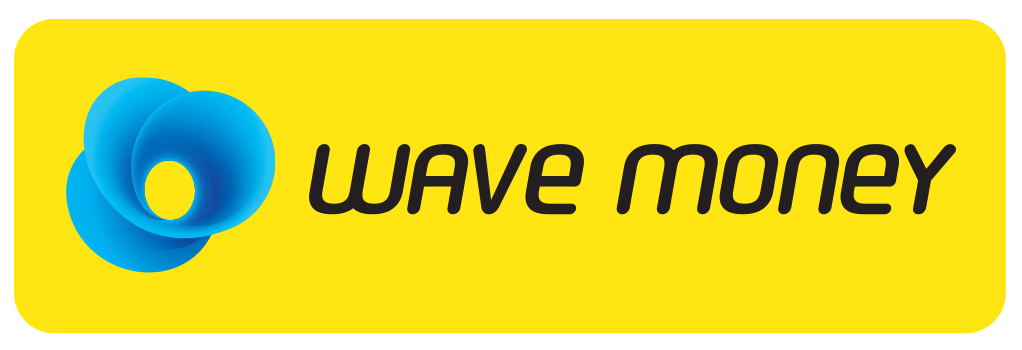
- Type: Joint Venture
- Founded: November 9, 2016; 9 years ago
- Headquarters: Yangon, Myanmar
- Website: wavemoney.com.mm

Wave Money (Burmese: ဝေ့မန်းနီး) is a Myanmar-based mobile financial services provider headquartered in Yangon. The company was established in 2016.

== History ==
Wave Money was established in 2015 as a joint venture between Telenor Group, Yoma Bank, Yoma Strategic Holdings and First Myanmar Investment. The founding CEO of Wave Money was Brad Jones, an experienced executive in mobile financial services who had also been the founder of Wing Cambodia in 2008. In August 2016, Wave Money was awarded the license to become the first non-bank institution to work under Myanmar's new Mobile Financial Services Regulation. After two months of launching Wave Money, the number of its subscribers reached 100000 customers and reached 1.3 million as of March 2018.

During 2018, transactions amounted to $1.3 billion, which is approx 2 percent of Myanmar's GDP, and raised to $4.3 billion during 2019.

In June 2018, in association with the United Nations Capital Development Fund and Australia's Department of Foreign Affairs and Trade, Wave Money launched Shwe Toe, a financial education gamification app that aims to help young women with a better understanding of financial concepts.

In March 2019, Wave Money collaborated with Myanmar Economic Bank to provide mobile pension payments to government pensioners.

In November 2019, Yoma Strategic acquired 10% stake from First Myanmar Investment.

In May 2020, Alibaba Group's fintech arm, Ant Financial Group announced an investment of $73.5 million with the intention to make a 33% stake in WaveMoney by way of new share issuance.

In June 2020, Yoma Strategic founded Yoma MFS (Wave Holdco) with the plan of acquiring Telenor's entire 51% stake in Wave Money.
