= Myanmar and the World Bank =

Financial strategies

Myanmar is considered a lower-middle income state, and although there are areas in the country that are lagging there have been measurable improvements in terms of development since 2005. The World Bank's current strategy in Myanmar is to focus on rural development. Due to the conflict in the Rakhine area the World Bank Group (WBG) has increased its focus on social inclusion. Implementation of projects within Myanmar have increased access to electricity, schools, and healthcare. The current framework is laid out in the Myanmar Country Partnership Framework 2015-2019.

== World Bank Projects ==
=== 1956–1961 ===
During this time frame the World Bank Group (WBG) completed three projects within Myanmar: Two railway projects and a project for the Port of Rangoon. The approved fundings for these projects totaled US$14M. No data is available for the ratings or results of these projects. All three of these projects were funded by the IBRD.

=== 1973–1987 ===
The WBG was more heavily involved with Myanmar approving 30 projects totaling 63M USD. The sectors of projects included the following:

- Irrigation and Drainage (7)
- Forestry (4)
- Ports/Waterways (3)
- Agro-Industry and Marketing (2)
- Annual Crops (2)
- Other Industry (2)
- Perennial Crops (2)
- Telecommunication (2)
- Distribution and Transmission (1)
- Mining (1)

The biggest of these projects in terms of WBG contributions were the Nyaunggyat Dam Multipurpose 1980 project and the Power Project 1982. These projects were US$90M and US$80M respectively.

No data is available for the ratings or results of these projects.

=== 2007–2018 ===
The WBG has become engaged within Myanmar again totaling 22 projects during this time. The commitment amount for this time frame totals US$2,529M. The sector of projects during this period include:

- Central Government (6)
- Health (5)
- Other Education (4)
- Social Protection (4)
- Banking Institutions (3)
- Other Water Supply, Sanitation and Waste Management (3)
- Rural and Inter-Urban Roads (2)
- Distribution and Transmission (2)
- Irrigation and Drainage (2)
- Mining (2)

As of December 1, 2018 18 of these 22 projects are still open. The most expensive of these projects are the Reengagement and Reform Support Project, the National Electrification Project, and the National Community Driven Development Project. Each of these three projects have commitment amounts of US$400M or more.

==== Reengagement and reform support ====
The objectives of this project were to strengthen macroeconomic stability, improve financial management, and improve the investment climate. The approval date was 22 Jan 2013 and the closing date was 31 Oct 2013. The WBG branch that provided US$440M in funds for this project was the IDA. There is not any data available pertaining to the results of this project; however, the completion ratings are "Highly Satisfactory" in all categories. The independent ratings can be seen below.

Independent Evaluations Ratings 06-24-2014
Indicator	ICR Review
Outcomes	Highly Satisfactory
Risk to Development Outcome	Significant
Bank Performance	Satisfactory
Government Performance	Highly Satisfactory
Implementing Agency	Highly Satisfactory
ICR Quality	Satisfactory
M&E Quality	Substantial

==== National Electrification Project ====
The goal of this project is to increase accessibility of electricity throughout Myanmar. The approval date was September 16, 2015 and the closing date is September 30, 2021 and is receiving US$400M in funds from the IDA. The listed results for this project are "Moderately Satisfactory" for progress towards achievement and overall implementation progress as of July 16, 2018. The current results as of June 4, 2018 can be seen below.

Project Development Objective Indicators
Indicators	Baseline	Current	Target
People provided with access to electricity	0.0	722790.00	5672500.00
Community electricity connections	0.0	5499.00	21400.00
Public lighting	0.0	14489.00	132000.00

Based upon trajectories provided for the project, the WBG is far below their targets that they were expected to hit. Current trajectories do not indicate that the WBG will be able to achieve their target numbers for the project by 2021.

==== National Community Driven Development Project ====
The goal of this project it to allow poor rural communities access to basic infrastructure and services. The IDA has a commitment amount of 400M USD. The approval date was June 30, 2015 and the closing date has not yet been determined as of December 3, 2018. The IDA agreement is being restructured to extend the project into 2021. This project is aimed at benefiting several development sectors including sub-national government, education, health, rural roads. and water supplies. There is no data available for the ratings or results of the project.

== IFC and MIGA Involvement ==
=== IFC ===
As of May 2017 the IFC has a total commitment in Myanmar of 885M USD. The IFC is in the pursuit of three objectives within the Asian country: access to infrastructure, developing agriculture and tourism, and promoting financial inclusion. The IFC is also providing large amounts of advisory services. In April 2017 these services equated to US$32.1M. The focuses of these services include increasing the investment environment and implementing reforms to improve the business environment. As of 2017 there were not any non-performing loans in the IFC portfolio. The IFC has experience difficulties when working with the Myanmar government. Needed documents to ensure long-term private financed have not been received, and greatly limit the capacity of the IFC.

=== MIGA ===
In 2017 MIGA had two active projects in telecommunication that created a total exposure of US$511.94M. The guarantee is in place to offer coverage for risks such as war and civil disturbances. The projects are speculated to greatly improve telecommunication infrastructure and allow further growth in the Myanmar economy. In 2017 MIGA was considering another guarantee in Myanmar, although this time focusing on electricity infrastructure. The IFC is also expected to contribute to this project if it gets approved. It is speculated that the project would offer significant employment, and off-set the extreme energy deficit that exists within the country.

== World Bank Group Response to Rohingya Displacement ==
On October 12, 2017, the World Bank Group posted a press release expressing their concern in regards to the violence and forced displacement that have been actively used against the Rohingya. They emphasize that the main focus of the projects will focus on improving education, health services, electricity, and ethnic/religion inclusion. International groups such as the UN are also heavily involved. The overall message is for the Myanmar regime to de-escalate the situation and allow displaced populations to return. In order to promote the well-being of the people within the Rakhine State the WBG is seeking opportunities to assist the government in implementing policies recommended by the Advisory Commission on Rakhine State. Before the implementations of any new projects conflict assessments are conducted. In order to support peace the World Bank has targeted conflict stricken areas: Increasing communities' access to service and opportunities. Furthermore, their strategy is to work with all stakeholders. At times this has also included armed ethnic groups.
