= Myanmar Distribution Group =

Myanmar Distribution Group, established in 1996, is a fast moving consumer goods distributor in Myanmar. MDG headquartered in Yangon. It is a national distributor for international brands in Myanmar, such as Nestle, Milo, Sunkist, Mamee, Mister Potato, Danisa, Kopiko.
