= Myanma Pharmaceutical Industry Enterprise =

Myanma Pharmaceutical Industrial Enterprise
- မြန်မာ့ဆေးဝါးလုပ်ငန်း

Agency overview
- Formed: 1957; 69 years ago
- Parent agency: Ministry of Industry

Myanma Pharmaceutical Industrial Enterprise (MPIE; Burmese: မြန်မာ့ဆေးဝါးလုပ်ငန်း) is a state-owned enterprise (SOE) under the Ministry of Industry that conducts R&D, manufacturing and distribution for over 200 essential pharmaceuticals.

MPIE has a domestic market share ranging between 3% and 10%. MPIE also exports antivenom drugs to neighboring Cambodia and Laos. In 2016, MPIE produced over 800 million tablets and capsules, and has launched new product lines including vaccinations and antibiotics, in recent years. MPIE also supplies drugs to other government agencies, including the Ministry of Defence, and the Ministry of Health and Sports.

== History ==
During the socialist era, Burma had a single registered drug producer, the Burma Pharmaceutical Industry (BPI), whose brand had a solid reputation among domestic consumers. It was renamed the Myanmar Pharmaceutical Factory (MPF) in 1988. MPIE continues to use the BPI trademark, because the brand name remains reputable and highly recognized domestically.

== Operations ==
MPIE operates 3 state-owned pharmaceutical factories throughout Myanmar:

- Insein, Yangon Region
- Inyaung, Kyaukse Township, Mandalay Region
- Ywathagyi, Hlegu Township, Yangon Region

== See also ==
- Healthcare in Myanmar
- Food and Drug Administration (Myanmar)
