= ATOM Myanmar =

Telecommunications company of Myanmar

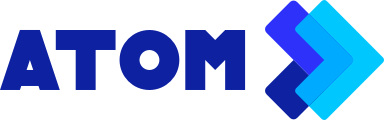
- Beyond Better - ပိုမိုကောင်းမွန်သော နေ့သစ်များဆီ
- Native name: အက်တမ် မြန်မာ
- Industry: Telecommunications
- Predecessor: Telenor Myanmar
- Founded: 2022; 4 years ago
- Headquarters: Yangon, Myanmar
- Key people: Ahmad Abdallah, CEO
- Website: www.atom.com.mm

ATOM Myanmar (Burmese: အက်တမ် မြန်မာ), is a telecommunications company in Myanmar (Burma). After the 2021 Myanmar coup d'état, the Norwegian Telenor Group divested its Telenor Myanmar operations, selling it to the joint venture owned by Lebanese M1 Group and Shwe Byain Phyu. The company officially rebranded as ATOM on 8 June 2022. As of 2025, ATOM Myanmar's CEO is Ahmad Abdallah. According to ATOM Myanmar's official announcement, its former CEO, Muhammad Ziaullah Siddiqui, stepped down in May 2024 due to his personal family commitments requiring his presence in Dubai. He remained on the board of directors for ATOM Myanmar and Investcom Pte Ltd., and served as an advisor to ATOM until the end of 2024.

== Cellular services and future plans for 5G ==
ATOM Myanmar (then Telenor Myanmar) launched its operations on September 27, 2014, in Mandalay; on October 3, 2014, in Naypyidaw; and on October 26, 2014, in Yangon. Then, ATOM launched in other cities and rural areas. The company started advertising its 3G network in mid-2015.

ATOM offers 2G, 3G, 4G (LTE) and 4.5G (LTE-A) networks, with VoLTE.

ATOM launched 4G networks in July 2016. VoLTE services were added in January 2019.

In mid-2022, ATOM became one of the first telecommunications companies in Myanmar to discuss its plans for 5G. ATOM officially announced its successful 5G trials in mid-2024. According to nPerf, ATOM's 5G network is already available in some areas of Yangon.

== ATOM Power ==
ATOM Power (formerly Telenor Broadband) is a broadband internet service offered by ATOM that includes two main options: Power Fiber (FTTH Broadband) and Power Wireless (Wireless Home Internet). Power Fiber (then Telenor Fiber Internet) services were first launched in late 2016, marketed for higher speeds and reliability. Power Wireless (then Telenor Home Wireless Internet) services were launched in mid-2018. ATOM Power has its own app available on the Apple App Store and the Google Play Store.

== Problems ==
Many users complain that ATOM struggles with bad coverage for users living on the ground floors of many apartment buildings. Users often find not receiving OTP codes via SMS. This issue has been present since the early days of ATOM, when it was still called Telenor.

== History ==
In the aftermath of the 2021 Myanmar coup d'état, Telenor faced increasing pressure from the State Administration Council, the military junta, to activate intercept equipment to surveil and monitor its 18 million customers. In May 2021, Telenor was forced to write off its US$780 million investment in Myanmar. On 8 July 2021, Telenor announced it would sell Telenor Myanmar for US$105 million to M1 Group, an investment company based in Lebanon, founded by Taha and Najib Mikati. In February 2022, reports emerged that Shwe Byain Phyu, a local conglomerate linked with the Burmese military, would own 80% of Telenor Myanmar, with Lebanese M1 Group owning the remaining shares. On October 27, 2023, Shwe Byain Phyu Group was sanctioned by the Canadian government for their connection to the Burmese military.

The sale prompted significant scrutiny from Burmese civil society over data privacy concerns, given SBP and Thein Win Zaw's links to the Burmese military. Legal experts and activists urged Telenor to protect customer metadata, by putting the sale on hold or by deleting the data before the transaction was completed. On 10 February, Duwa Lashi La, the acting president of the National Unity Government called on the acting president of Norway to intervene and prevent the sale. Activist groups like Justice for Myanmar called on the Norwegian government to stop the sale, because of Shwe Byain Phyu's close ties to the Burmese military.

The sale was approved by the Myanmar Investment Commission on 18 March 2022. Shwe Byain Phyu and M1 Group have formed a joint venture, Investcom, to take over Telenor operations in Myanmar. Ownership was transferred on 25 March, and Telenor Myanmar was rebranded to ATOM on 8 June 2022.

== See also ==
- Telenor Myanmar
- Telecommunications in Myanmar
- Ooredoo Myanmar
- Mytel
- Myanma Posts and Telecommunications
