= Justice for Myanmar =

Political organisation

Justice For Myanmar
- Formation: Website launched on April 28, 2020; 6 years ago
- Purpose: Anti-corruption; government accountability
- Website: www.justiceformyanmar.org

Justice For Myanmar (abbreviated JFM) is a covert group of activists campaigning for justice and accountability for the people of Myanmar. Justice for Myanmar's public website launched on 28 April 2020. Since its launch, the group has published a number of high-profile exposés related to the business dealings of high-ranking military and government officials in the country, as part of a campaign to publicly pressure the dismantling of the Burmese military's business practices and systemic corruption.

In August 2020, the Burmese government blocked the group's website, under Section 77 of Myanmar's telecommunications law, which has been used by the government as a censorship tool to stifle dissent and public scrutiny. On 29 August 2020, Telenor Myanmar issued a statement stating that it and all other mobile operators and internet service providers in Myanmar had received the government directive. It confirming that Telenor had complied with the directive, but noted its position on freedom of expression and the right of access to information. On 3 September 2020, the group launched a mirror site to circumvent the censorship. The censorship was condemned by a joint statement by Reporters Without Borders, Sherpa, and Info Birmanie. The censorship of JFM was cited as an example in the escalation of technical censorship in Myanmar's 2020 Freedom on the Net report, published by Freedom House.

== Significant exposes ==
In May 2020, JFM exposed a lucrative lease agreement between the military and a Japanese-led development consortium that is building the $330 million Y Complex on the former site of Jubilee Hall in Yangon.

In September 2020, Justice for Myanmar, in collaboration with Amnesty International, published an expose demonstrating how revenue from the military-owned Myanmar Economic Holdings Limited, including in joint ventures with international firms like Kirin Brewery, are used to fund military operations, and reward and punish soldiers with shareholder dividends. JFM also exposed dividend payments received by key shareholders, including Min Aung Hlaing, Myanmar's Commander-in-Chief, who received a dividend payment of $250,000 during the 2010-11 fiscal year.

In October 2020, JFM published an investigation into the military's proxy political party, the Union Solidarity and Development Party for acquiring and earning revenue from state assets and stoking racism, in potential contravention of Myanmar's Political Parties Registration Law.

In December 2020, JFM published leaked documents highlighting controversial arms purchases by the Burmese military that could run afoul of European Union sanctions and arms embargoes. Later that month, it released a major investigation detailing a “web of cronyism and corruption” surrounding the national telecommunications carrier Mytel, a joint venture between the Burmese military Vietnam's Ministry of National Defence (which owns Viettel). The report also noted the Burmese military's ability to harvest personal data from Mytel users for surveillance purposes.

In September 2024, JFM published a joint report with Info Birmanie, detailing Aviation Industry Corporation of China (AVIC), business with the Myanmar military and Airbus' links with AVIC. The report outlined how the supplied aircraft and weapons had been used by the Myanmar military to strike civilian and commit war crimes in the Myanmar civil war.

In June 2025, JFM reported that Airbus had completed it divestment in from AviChina, AVIC's publicly listed subsidiary.

== Awards ==
- Right Livelihood Award (2025)

== See also ==
- Corruption in Myanmar
- Censorship in Myanmar
