= Thein Win Zaw =

Burmese businessman

- သိန်းဝင်းဇော်
- Born: 2 February 1963 (age 63); Burma
- Occupation: Entrepreneur
- Known for: Chair, Shwe Byain Phyu Group
- Spouse: Tin Latt Min
- Children: Win Paing Kyaw; Theint Win Htet

Thein Win Zaw (Burmese: သိန်းဝင်းဇော်; born 2 February 1963) is a Burmese entrepreneur. He is the founder of Shwe Byain Phyu Group, a conglomerate company active in businesses such as petrol stations, timber, and food exports.

From 2018 to 2020 he was the chair of the Gems and Jewelry Entrepreneurs Association in Yangon.

== Early life and family ==
Thein Win Zaw was born on February 2, 1963, in Twante Township, Yangon Region, Myanmar. He completed his high school studies in 1978–79, and later pursued higher education, earning a Bachelor of Science degree in chemistry in 1984.

Thein Win Zaw is married to Tin Latt Min, and has two children, Win Paing Kyaw and Theint Win Htet. The family members together own at least 20 companies. Tin Latt Min's mother was the teacher of Tha Aye, a general.

== Career ==
Zaw established Manaw Thidar, the first company under the Shwe Byain Phyu (SBP) Group in 1996. Co-led by Zaw and his wife, Tin Latt Min, the company provided logistics services to Joint Corporation 6 (JC-6). SBP operates a business partnership with the military-owned Myanma Economic Holdings Limited for mining, logging, fuel imports and distribution. Thein Win Zaw's business success has been attributed to his close relationship with the Myanmar Armed Force's senior leadership, including the Myanmar Navy commanders-in-chief Tin Aung San and Soe Thane, acting president Myint Swe, and Thein Aung, the father of Zaw Hein, a general.

In 2010, as Myanmar Petroleum Products Enterprise (MPPE) began privatizing state-owned petrol stations, SBP expanded its operations to include retail, owning 29 petrol stations.

Zaw also ventured into the marine products export sector, using his fishery experience to diversify revenue streams. A subsidiary, Eastern Power International, was established in 2002 to manage these operations.

In 2009 Zaw further diversified by establishing Theint Win Htet Manufacturing, specializing in PP plastic bag production, with a daily capacity of 100,000 bags, which are distributed across Myanmar.

For the tax years 2017–2018 and 2018–2019 Zaw was recognized as one of the top taxpayers and was commended by President Win Myint for his tax contributions.

In the aftermath of the 2021 Myanmar coup d'état, Singapore-based Investcom Pte Ltd, a joint venture between the Lebanese M1 Investment Group and Myanmar's Shwe Byain Phyu conglomerate, acquired Telenor Myanmar in March 2022. Following the acquisition, concerns about ties to the Myanmar military and data privacy emerged. However, in April 2022, the new parent company addressed these concerns, committing to uphold the data privacy policies of its predecessor. ATOM Myanmar was launched in June 2022.
