= Thein Aung (businessman) =

Burmese businessman (1965–2021)

Thein Aung (Burmese: သိန်းအောင်; 1965 — 4 November 2021) was a Burmese business executive who was the chief financial officer (CFO) of Myanmar's major telecommunications company, Mytel. He was a retired major in Myanmar Navy, held leadership positions in multiple military-owned ventures, including as the general manager of the conglomerate Myanmar Economic Corporation and its subsidiary Star High Co., Ltd.

== Career ==
During his military career he was a personal assistant to the former Myanmar navy chief. He was also reportedly close to the current chief, Admiral Moe Aung, as they are both from the same batch at the military academy. He retired from the military service with the rank of major and joined the military businesses.

Thein Aung had served on the board of multiple military owned businesses, including the Star High Group and the Star High company, Jewels of Angels, Golden Majestic Star Mobile, Agro Pack and Telecom International Myanmar. He joined Mytel as a member of the board of directors in 2018 and served as the CFO of the company until 2019 when he resigned.

Following the 2021 Myanmar coup d'état, anti-regime forces have increasingly targeted Myanmar military-linked businesses, Thein Aung was their most high-profile victim at the time of his death.

== Death ==
On 4 November 2021, he and his wife Theint Aung Thu were shot dead by an unidentified man as they were leaving their house to walk at around 7:30 am. He died on the spot after being shot four times, and his wife was seriously injured. Some 150 military troops began a search of the township in the hours after his death. Some 20 young people living in a hostel in Mayangone Township were reportedly arrested on the evening of November 4.
