= Ministry of Transport and Communications (Myanmar) =

Government ministry of Myanmar

- ပို့ဆောင်ရေးနှင့် ဆက်သွယ်ရေးဝန်ကြီးဌာန
- Seal of the Ministry

Ministry overview
- Formed: 30 March 2016
- Jurisdiction: Government of Myanmar
- Headquarters: Naypyidaw
- Minister responsible: Tin Aung San
- Website: motc.gov.mm

Ministry of Transport and Communications (Burmese: ပို့ဆောင်ရေးနှင့် ဆက်သွယ်ရေးဝန်ကြီးဌာန; abbreviated as MOTC) was a government ministry of Myanmar responsible for regulating the transport and communication sectors. The ministry was led by Admiral Tin Aung San. Under the state of emergency immediately after the 2021 coup, he was appointed by the State Administration Council on 3 February 2021. In this regard, the Committee Representing Pyidaungsu Hluttaw claims that the military regime's cabinet is illegitimate.

The Ministry of Transport and Communications was split into the Ministry of Transport and the Ministry of Digital Development and Communications.

== History ==
On 29 January 1992, the Ministry of Transport and Communications was organized with Ministry of Transport, Ministry of Rail Transportation and Ministry of Communications, Post and Telegraph.

On 9 November 2012, the Ministry's name was changed to the Ministry of Communications and Information Technology.

On 30 March 2016, it was renamed to the Ministry of Transport and Communications by Htin Kyaw's new government.

In 2019 and 2020, the Ministry ordered Telenor Myanmar to stop providing service to townships in Rakhine State and Chin State, citing the Rohingya conflict.

== Organization ==
According to the official website of the Ministry of Transport and Communications as of April 17, 2021.

=== Minister's office ===
- Office of the Minister of Transportation and Communications

=== Administrations ===
- Department of Transportation Planning
- Road Transport Administration Department
- Department of Civil Aviation
- Department of Meteorology and Hydrology
- Department of Marine Administration
- Directorate of Water Resources and Improvement of River Systems
- Post and Telecommunications Department (Jurisdiction includes administration of telecoms carriers and internet service providers.)
- Information Technology and Cyber Security Department

=== State-owned enterprises ===
- Myanma Railways
- Road Transport
- Myanmar National Airlines
- Myanma Port Authority
- Myanmar Shipyards
- Inland Water Transport
- Myanma Posts and Telecommunications
- Myanmar Post

=== Educational institutions ===
- Central Institute of Transport and Communications
- Myanmar Maritime University
- Myanmar Mercantile Marine College

== See also ==
- Transport in Myanmar
- Telecommunications in Myanmar
- Internet in Myanmar
