= Jubilee Hall =

Jubilee Hall may refer to:

- Jubilee Hall (Fisk University), on a university campus in Nashville, Tennessee, a building completed in 1876
- Jubilee Hall, Hyderabad, a royal palace built in that Indian state in 1913
- Jubilee Hall, London, a concert hall and gymnasium in Covent Garden, London
- Jubilee Hall, Rangoon, a colonial-era landmark in Rangoon, Burma (now Yangon, Myanmar)
- Jubilee Hall, University of Delhi, a hall build on the Jubilee celebration of the university of Delhi in 1947
