= Arakanese Wikipedia =

Arakanese-language edition of Wikipedia

- Screenshot
- Native name: ရခိုင်ဝီကီးပီးဒီးယား
- Website type: Internet encyclopedia project
- Available in: Arakanese (Rakhine)
- Owner: Wikimedia Foundation
- Creator: Arakanese Wikipedia community
- Website: rki.wikipedia.org
- Commercial: No
- Registration: Optional
- Launched: 29 August 2025
- Content license: Creative Commons Attribution/ Share-Alike 4.0 (most text also dual-licensed under GFDL); Media licensing varies

Arakanese Wikipedia, also known as Rakhine Wikipedia or Arakan Wikipedia, is the Arakanese-language edition of the free online encyclopedia Wikipedia. It operates at rki.wikipedia.org, using the language code rki. The project developed in the Wikimedia Incubator before receiving its own domain in August 2025.

The edition has 1,784 articles and 1,378 registered users, including 23 active users and 2 administrators.

== History ==
=== Development and launch ===
The encyclopedia initially developed as the Wp/rki test project in the Wikimedia Incubator. A request for a separate language edition was submitted on 4 October 2022. Discussion of the proposal addressed the need for sustained editing activity and the translation of the MediaWiki interface. The Wikimedia Language Committee approved the project on 23 April 2025.

Wikimedia's deployment record states that the site was live on 11 August 2025. Its creation was announced in the technical newsletter published on 19 August. The project's own history gives 29 August 2025 as its launch date. The task for importing content from the Incubator was marked as resolved on 3 September 2025.

=== Timeline ===
4 October 2022: A request for a separate Wikipedia edition was submitted. 23 April 2025: The Wikimedia Language Committee approved the project. August 2025: The separate Wikipedia site became available. 3 September 2025: The Incubator import task was closed as resolved.

=== Events and outreach ===
The project records four workshops in Ayutthaya, Thailand:

Date	Topics
11 October 2022	Introduction to Wikipedia and the proposed Arakanese edition; approximately 20 attendees.
18 November 2022	Contributions to the Incubator project and approval requirements; approximately 30 attendees.
2 February 2025	Arakanese literature, linguistics and technology.
21 October 2025	Language research, Wikipedia participation, poetry and historical literature.

In May 2025, contributor YaThaWinTha attended the ESEAP Strategy Summit in Manila on behalf of the Myanmar Wikimedia Community User Group, representing participation from Mon and Arakan Wikipedia. His summit report described discussions about translation, community development and collaboration. It also recorded a request for support for translation tools on Arakan Wikipedia and advice to complete MediaWiki core-message translations.

== Statistics ==
Arakanese Wikipedia statistics
Measure	Total
Articles	1,784
Total pages	6,144
Edits	21,884
Registered users	1,378
Active users	23
Administrators	2
Locally uploaded files	0

Its earlier test-project figures were 2,918 pages, 74 editors and 9,721 edits.

== Content and platform ==
The main page provides navigation to science, literature, the arts, mathematics, health, technology, philosophy, religion, geography, society and history. It also links to material about Rakhine writers, historical cities, rulers and dynasties, together with introductory editing guidance and community discussion pages.

The edition uses MediaWiki and a left-to-right writing direction. The approved local project name is ဝီကီးပီးဒီးယား. Its initial configuration disabled local file uploads, with the approval documentation directing contributors to Wikimedia Commons for media uploads.

== Community development ==
In his 2025 summit report, YaThaWinTha identified contributor recruitment, locally relevant content and source verification as areas needing attention. He proposed Arakanese-language editing tutorials and training activities, alongside closer use of Wikimedia Commons and Wikidata.

== See also ==
Burmese Wikipedia List of Wikipedias Rakhine language Wikimedia Incubator
