= Y Complex =

Real estate complex in Yangon, Myanmar

Y Complex and Y Square
- Location: Yangon, Myanmar
- Coordinates: 16.785271376443152°N 96.15260119088344°E
- Status: Under construction
- Estimated completion: 2021
- Website: www.yc-ys.com.mm

Technical details
- Size: 3.95 acres (1.60 ha)
- Leasable area: 92,000 square metres (990,000 sq ft)

Y Complex is a US$300 million (equivalent to $400.95 million in 2024) real estate development in Yangon, Myanmar. It is being built on a plot measuring 3.95 acres (1.60 ha) owned by the Burmese military. The complex is located near Shwedagon Pagoda, at the intersection of Shwedagon Pagoda Road and U Wisara Roads. Y Complex will encompass 92,000 square metres (990,000 sq ft) of space, and house an office building, retail space, and a luxury Okura hotel. The complex is being built on the former grounds of Jubilee Hall, Rangoon, a colonial-era landmark, and the Defence Services Museum.

The project is being led by a Japanese-led consortium, including Fujita Corporation, Tokyo Tatemono and the Japan Overseas Infrastructure Investment Corporation for Transport & Urban Development, in partnership with an affiliate of Ayeyar Hinthar, a local conglomerate.

== Controversies ==
The project has been the subject of significant controversy, particularly over the lack of civilian oversight and financial transparency on a US$2.18 million (equivalent to $2.65 million in 2024) lease agreement between the Burmese military and the Yangon Technical and Trading Company, a subsidiary of Zaw Win Shein's Ayeyar Hinthar, which is a proxy of the Burmese military. The funds from the lease agreement flow straight into the military's Quartermaster General's office, outside of civilian oversight. Details of the lease agreement are shielded from Myanmar's Auditor-General.

On February 16, 2021, Human rights organizations including Human Rights Watch and Justice For Myanmar requested the United Nations Working Group on Business and Human Rights to investigate the project's ties to the Myanmar military. The organizations raised concerns that in addition to the land lease payments, the project would create "immovable long-term assets for the military, which can continue to yield income after the agreement is terminated." On July 15, 2021, the same organizations called on Japanese business entities involved in the project to end their participation.

Ayeyar Hinthar did not respond to allegations of partnering with the Burmese military, while the Japanese investor, Tokyo Tatemono, issued a statement pledging to develop a corporate policy around human rights.

Due to its proximity to the pagoda, its buildings will have a maximum height of 184 feet (56 m), to comply with the city's height restrictions for developments near the pagoda.

== See also ==
- Jubilee Hall, Rangoon
- Yangon
