= Pansodan Dala ferry boat =

Pansodan Dala ferry Boat
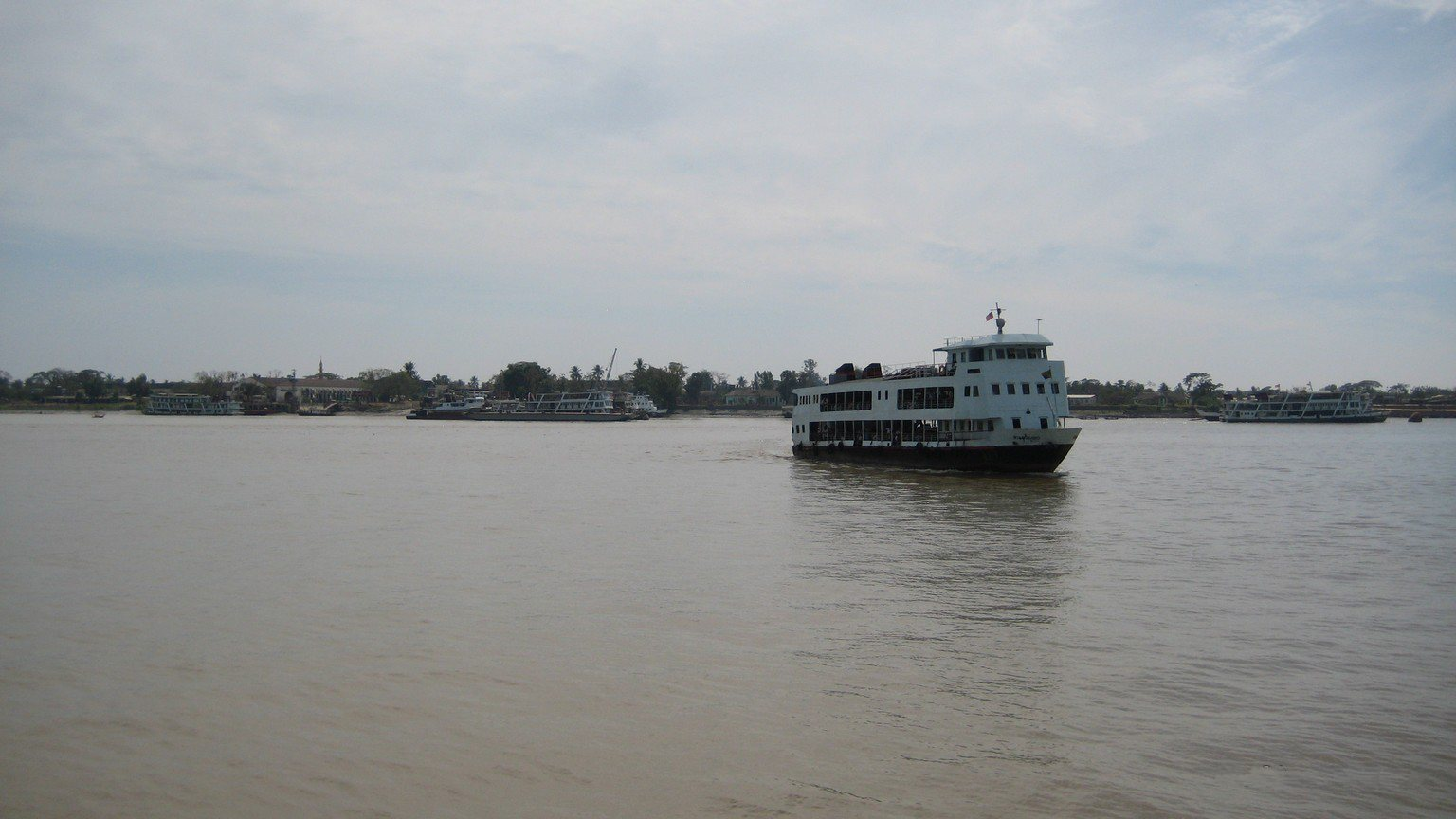
- Waterway: Yangon River
- Transit type: Passenger Ferry
- Owner: Ministry of Transport (Myanmar)
- Operator: Ministry of Transport (Myanmar)
- No. of terminals: Pansodan, Dala
- Daily ridership: 25,000 to 30,000
- Website: http://www.iwt.gov.mm

Pansodan-Dala ferry service is a ferry service across the Yangon River in Myanmar, running between Pansodan Jetty in downtown Yangon and Dala Township. It is owned and operated by the state-owned Inland Water Transport Enterprise of Myanmar. It is a major transport service for the people of Dala Township and its neighbouring towns. On top of the main ferry, there are 100 motorboat ferries that transport passengers between Yangon and three jetties in Dala. These boats are popular because they are faster but are tightly packed around the jetties and sometimes have a risk of capsizing.
