= Department of Meteorology and Hydrology (Myanmar) =

- မိုးလေဝသနှင့် ဇလဗေဒ ညွှန်ကြားမှု ဦးစီးဌာန; DMH

Agency overview
- Formed: 1 April 1937
- Jurisdiction: Myanmar
- Headquarters: Naypyidaw
- Parent agency: Ministry of Transport and Communications
- Website: www.moezala.gov.mm

The Department of Meteorology and Hydrology (Burmese: မိုးလေဝသနှင့် ဇလဗေဒ ညွှန်ကြားမှု ဦးစီးဌာန; DMH) is a government agency under the Ministry of Transport and Communications. It is responsible for weather forecasting, hydrological services, and natural disaster mitigation in Myanmar.

== History ==
The department was originally established as the independent Burma Meteorological Department (BMD) on 1 April 1937. Myanmar became a member of the International Meteorological Organization (IMO) in January 1938.

Key historical milestones include:

- 1 June 1947: Commenced the issuance of the Myanmar Daily Weather Report.
- 23 October 1972: The department underwent reorganization.
- 1974: Officially renamed to the Department of Meteorology and Hydrology (DMH).
- 3 February 1992: Transferred to the Ministry of Communications, Posts and Telegraphs from the Ministry of Transport and Communication.
- 20 August 1999: Transferred to the administration of the Ministry of Transport.

== Objectives ==
The primary objectives of the Department of Meteorology and Hydrology (DMH) are centered on disaster risk reduction and the promotion of national socio-economic development. The department is mandated to implement precautionary measures to minimize the adverse effects of natural disasters. Furthermore, it plays a critical role in promoting the safety, comfort, and efficiency of air, land (rail and road), and maritime transportation systems.

In line with sustainable development goals, the DMH supports the effective management of natural resources, including hydroelectric power, forestry, water usage, and wind energy. The department also provides essential meteorological data to enhance agricultural productivity and food security. Its activities extend to ensuring efficient planning and operational development in sectors such as national defense, industry, health, and social welfare, while actively engaging in international collaboration to align with global development standards.
