= Innwa Bank =

Bank in Myanmar

Innwa Bank Limited
- Native name: အင်းဝဘဏ်လီမိတက်
- Type: Private
- Industry: Bank
- Founded: 28 November 1997; 28 years ago
- Founder: Myanmar Economic Corporation
- Headquarters: Kyauktada Township, Yangon, Myanmar (Burma)
- Total assets: Ks.320 billion (US$2.60 million) (2021-22)
- Website: www.ablmm.com

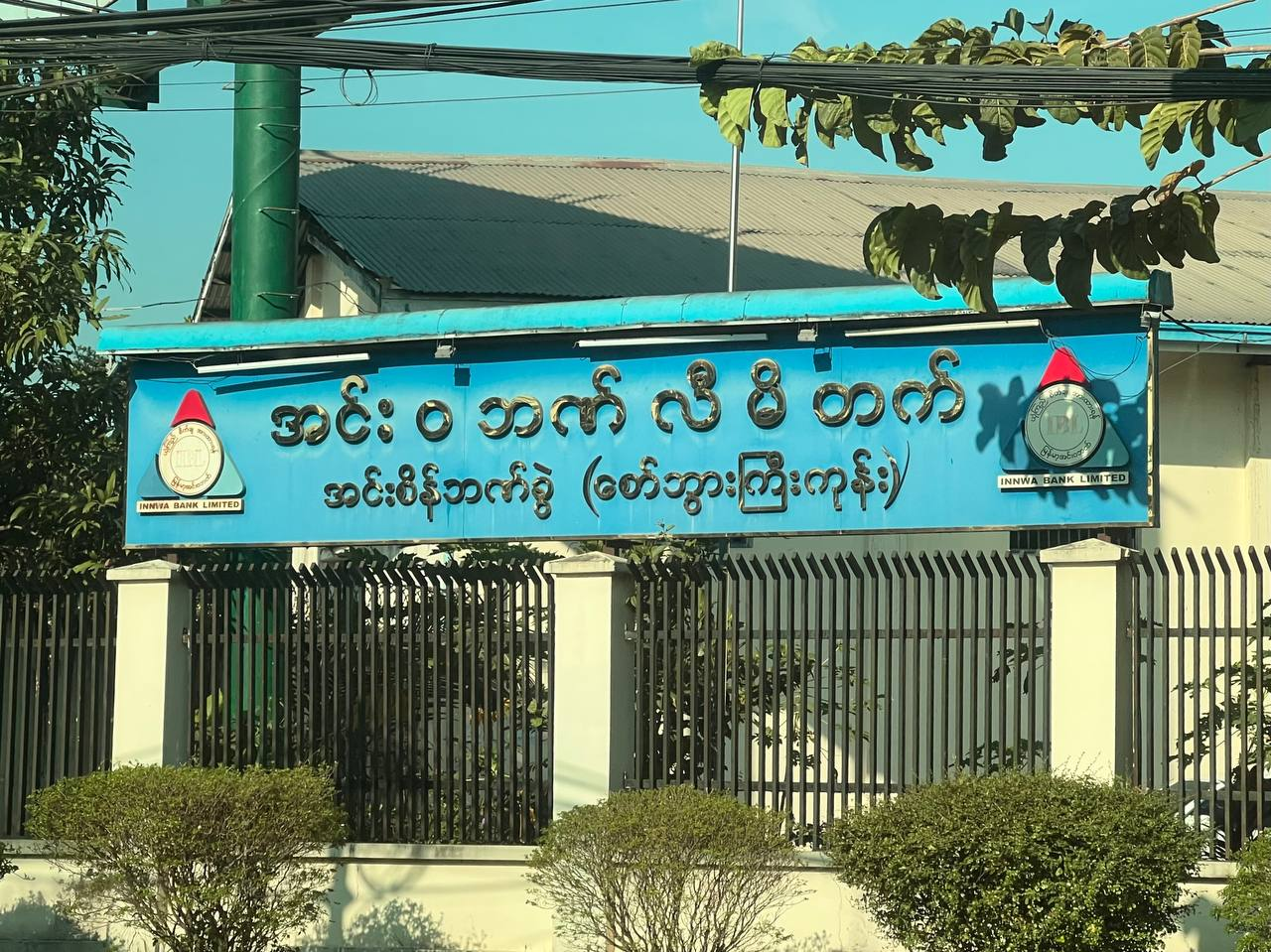
Picture of Inwa Bank Branch

Innwa Bank Limited (Burmese: အင်းဝဘဏ်လီမိတက်) is a private commercial bank in Burma (Myanmar). Innwa Bank was founded by the Myanmar Economic Corporation (MEC) in 1997, a major conglomerate owned by serving and retired military officers of the Tatmadaw (the name of the country's combined military force), affiliated with the Myanmar Ministry of Defence. The bank serves as a financial vehicle for MEC's subsidiaries and affiliates. Innwa Bank is wholly owned by MEC, which is in turn, owned by the government. Military authorities control the bank's management.

In November 2022, whistleblower site Distributed Denial of Secrets published leaked documents from Innwa Bank. The leaks showed that major international banks, including ANZ, continued to do business with Myanmar's military after the coup. The leak resulted in increased scrutiny of major banks.
