= Jubilee Hall, Rangoon =

Jubilee Hall
- ဂျူဗလီဟော
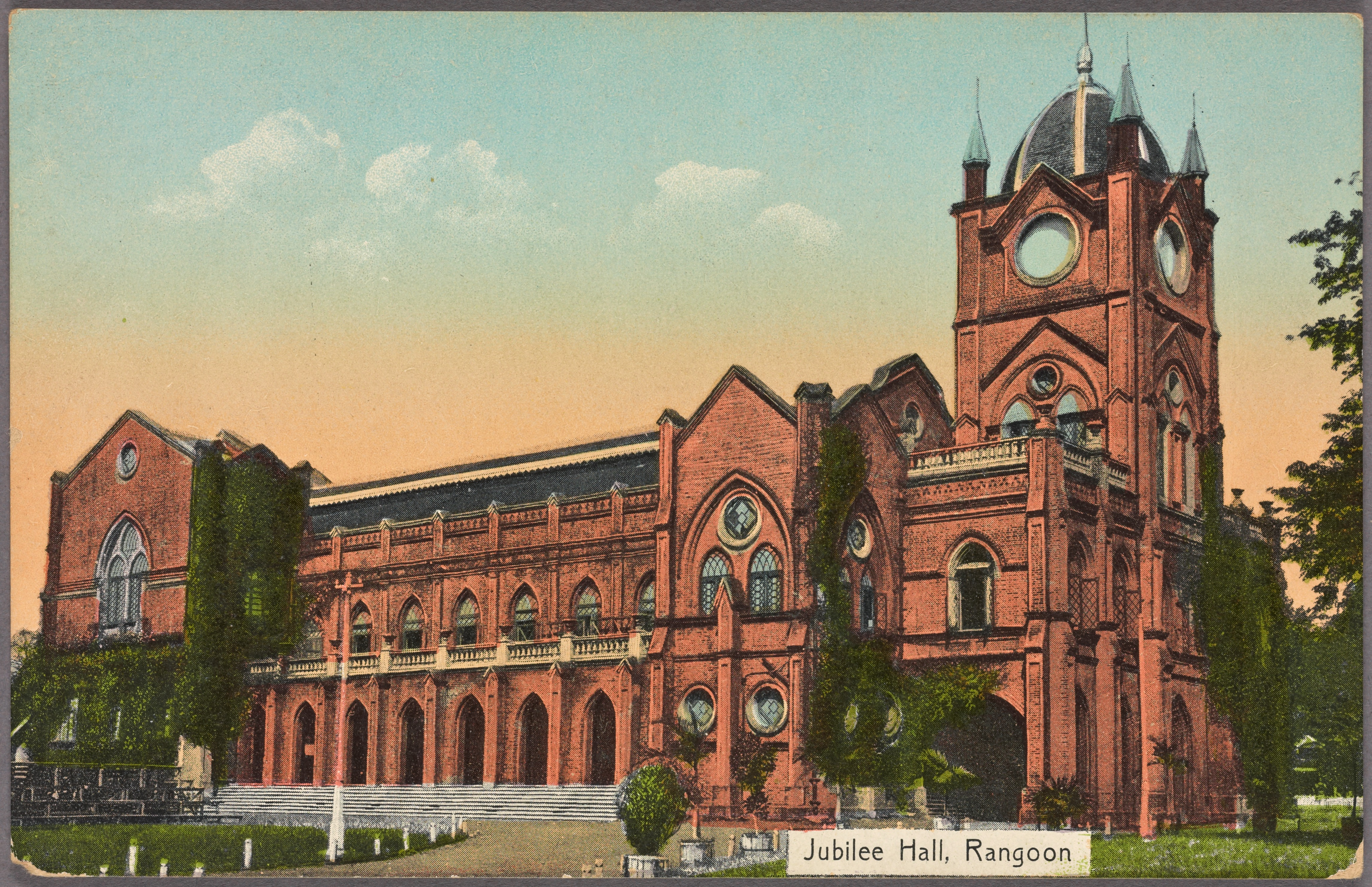
- Interactive map of the Jubilee Hall area

General information
- Architectural style: Gothic style
- Location: Rangoon, Burma
- Coordinates: 16.784921°N 96.152521°E
- Completed: 1897
- Demolished: 1985

Jubilee Hall (Burmese: ဂျူဗလီဟော) was a colonial-era landmark in Rangoon, Burma of historical significance, and considered "one of the best appointed theatres in the Orient" during the early part of the 20th century.

== History ==
Jubilee Hall, located on Shwedagon Pagoda Road in Dagon Township, was completed in 1897 to mark the Diamond Jubilee of Queen Victoria, commemorating the 60th anniversary of her reign. The building had replaced a complex of assembly rooms used by the colonial administrative apparatus, first constructed in 1854.

Throughout the colonial era, the site was managed by the Rangoon municipality, and used as an event and meeting space for high society in colonial Rangoon, including the inaugural convocation ceremony of Rangoon University. The building's well-appointed theatre had a capacity of 800 seats, with additional ballrooms to host clubs and cabarets.

With the onset of World War II and Japanese occupation, the Ba Maw government renamed the building the "Great Burmese Royal Hall" (မဟာဗမာရုံတော်ကြီး). In 1947, the building hosted the Anti-Fascist People’s Freedom League convention, during which Aung San drafted the Burma's first constitution. The following year, in 1948, the remains of Aung San and other government officials were laid in state at the hall for 6 months following their assassination at the Secretariat on 19 July, which is now observed as a national holiday, Burmese Martyrs' Day.

After Burmese independence, Jubilee Hall came under the possession of the Ministry of Culture, and served as the site of the National Library of Burma and National Museum of Burma for a time, before becoming a cultural center and arts and music school.

== Destruction and aftermath ==
Jubilee Hall emerged from a 1975 earthquake in Bagan relatively unscathed. Despite this, the Burmese socialist-era government demolished the building in 1985, ostensibly because of its significance as a legacy of the British colonial era.

The Burmese armed forces subsequently opened the Defence Services Museum at the site on 24 March 1994. The museum was short-lived, demolished in 2017 in favor of a US$300 million (equivalent to $410.54 million in 2025) real estate development called Y Complex Project, to be developed on a 3.95 acres (1.60 ha) plot. The project has been the subject of significant controversy, over lack of civilian oversight and financial transparency on a US$300 million (equivalent to $2.71 million in 2025) lease agreement between the Burmese military and the Yangon Technical and Trading Company, a subsidiary of Zaw Win Shein's Ayeyar Hinthar, which is a proxy of the Burmese military. The funds from the lease agreement flow straight into the military's quartermaster general’s office, outside of civilian oversight. The project's international partner is a Japanese-led consortium, including Fujita Corporation, Tokyo Tatemono and the Japan Overseas Infrastructure Investment Corporation for Transport & Urban Development .
