= Mytel =

Telecommunications company in Myanmar

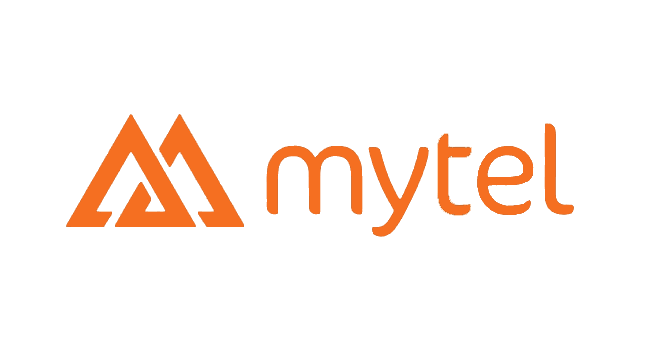
- Industry: Telecommunications
- Founded: 2017; 9 years ago
- Headquarters: Yangon, Myanmar
- Key people: Khin Maung Soe, CEO
- Parent: Viettel (49%); Myanmar Economic Corporation (28%); Myanmar National Telecom Holding Public Co Ltd (23%)
- Website: www.mytel.com.mm

Mytel is a major telecommunications company in Myanmar (Burma), as one of four national carriers. Mytel is operated as a joint venture between the Burmese military and Viettel, which is owned by Vietnam's Ministry of National Defence. Mytel has been criticized and scrutinized for serving as a major source of revenue for the Burmese military.

== History ==
Mytel was granted a telecommunications license on 12 January 2017. The company is operated as a joint venture, 49% owned by Viettel, which is controlled by the Vietnamese military, 28% owned by Star High Public Company, which is owned by the Burmese military's Myanmar Economic Corporation (MEC), and the remaining 23% owned by Myanmar National Telecom Holding Public Co Ltd, a consortium of local companies. Mytel uses telecoms infrastructure owned by MECtel, a separate operator controlled by MEC. The first call made on the network was between Myanmar's Commander-in-Chief, Min Aung Hlaing, and Vietnam's Minister of Defence, Ngo Xuan Lich.

In March 2020, whistleblowing organization Distributed Denial of Secrets published 156 gigabytes of data hacked from the Myanmar Investment Commission. The leak also revealed how millions of dollars allegedly flowed from Mytel subscribers to Myanmar military generals, and exposed business dealings of family members of prominent military leaders.

== Reception ==
Mytel has been criticized for undermining the competitiveness of Myanmar's telecoms market and the military's reassertion of dominance over telecommunications, through its large-scale investments. In June 2017, the government promulgated the Pricing and Tariff Regulatory Framework, including floor pricing rules for mobile fees, which was positioned to give Mytel a market advantage against lower-cost competitors like Ooredoo. Mytel was granted an exemption from floor pricing rules and was allowed to discount its rates after its launch, unlike other competitors. Through its aggressive price-cutting strategy, Mytel was able to capture a market share of 4% (2.4 million subscribers) within two months of its launch. By contrast, Mytel's competitors agreed to abide by the nominal rules of the free market.

Mytel has received mixed reactions from Burmese consumers due to its military links. After its launch, a movement of Burmese netizens launched a viral campaign to boycott the military-backed carrier, over its decision to offer phone numbers that start with the digits 969, which are symbolic of Myanmar's anti-Muslim nationalist movement.

In 2018, reports emerged that Mytel had run fiber-optic cables through privately owned plantations in Kayin State's Payathonzu without providing prior notice. Mytel has upgraded the Myanmar military's infrastructure, including the army's network of fiber-optic cables.

In May 2019, a subcontractor of Mytel, Hsan Myo Aung Company, staged a protest in Pathein, over unpaid wages to 20 employees, valued at approximately 40 million kyats. In October 2019, Mytel's telecoms cells installed at Shwedagon Pagoda were removed, following a dispute over unpaid rent.

In February 2020, Mytel was linked to a $1.2 million disinformation campaign on social media. Facebook banned a Mytel-linked network of two dozen pages and accounts after uncovering that these pages had "started out on a very patriotic and nationalist tone" before shifting to content promoting the Mytel brand, or content criticizing Mytel rivals, Ooredoo Myanmar, MPT and Telenor Myanmar.

In December 2020, Justice for Myanmar released a major investigation detailing a “web of cronyism and corruption” surrounding Mytel. The report also noted the Burmese military's ability to harvest personal data from Mytel users for mass surveillance purposes. The report prompted additional scrutiny into $60 million in loans provided by British banks HSBC and Standard Chartered to Viettel in connection with Mytel.

In the aftermath of the 2021 Myanmar coup d'état in February 2021, Burmese consumers launched a successful domestic boycott movement, targeting products and services linked to the Myanmar military, including Mytel. In the first quarter of 2021, Mytel lost US$25 million in profits, and saw its subscriber base decline by 2 million subscribers, down to 10 million as of April 2021. In the first 6 months of 2021, Mytel's sales workforce also decreased by 30%, due to mass resignations. As of November, over 80 Mytel-owned cellular towers had been sabotaged. On 4 November, Mytel's chief financial officer Thein Aung was assassinated by three men on bicycles at his home in Mayangon Township, Yangon. Thein Aung was a former naval officer, and also held executive positions at the military-owned Myanmar Economic Corporation.

In January 2025, the US Department of Commerce sanctioned Mytel for providing surveillance and financial support to the junta, enabling its human rights abuses by tracking and identifying individuals and groups, including its soldiers.

== See also ==
- Telecommunications in Myanmar
- Ooredoo Myanmar
- Telenor Myanmar
- Myanma Posts and Telecommunications
- ATOM Myanmar
