= Myanma Posts and Telecommunications =

Myanmar telecommunications company

Myanmar Posts and Telecommunications
- Moving Myanmar Forward - ရှေ့သို့လှမ်းချီ မြန်မာပြည်
- Native name: မြန်မာ့ဆက်သွယ်ရေးလုပ်ငန်း
- Type: State-owned enterprise
- Headquarters: Naypyidaw
- Area served: Myanmar
- Owner: Ministry of Transport and Communications
- Website: www.mpt.com.mm

Myanmar Posts and Telecommunications (Burmese: မြန်မာ့ဆက်သွယ်ရေးလုပ်ငန်း, romanized: Myanmá Hsekthwaeyè Loukngàn; abbreviated MPT) is a state-owned enterprise in Myanmar under the supervision of the Ministry of Transport and Communications. MPT operates the country's postal system, running over 1,000 post offices throughout Myanmar. Local Express Myanmar Postal Parcel Service was introduced in Yangon and Mandalay on 1 April 1992 and its services now extend to over 120 townships. Until 2013, MPT was also Myanmar's only telecommunications operator.

== Telecommunications ==
Myanmar Post and Telecommunications
- Type: mobile, voice and data
- Location: Myanmar
- Frequency: 450/800 MHz, 900/2100 MHz
- Operator: MPT; KDDI Summit Global Singapore (KDDI, Sumitomo Corporation)
- Established: 1884
- Current status: operational

Myanmar Posts and Telecommunications (MPT) is the first telecommunications operator in Myanmar. It has operated in the telecommunications industry since its founding in 1884. It provides fixed and mobile telecommunication services to people and enterprises, including a nationwide 3G network and a MIMO 4X4 powered data service known as LTE+.

In January 2017, mobile operator KDDI appointed Toshitake Amamiya as the new CEO of MPT, replacing Takashi Nagashima, who was CEO since July 2014. Amamiya was previously head of KDDI's global business division.

== Joint operations ==
In July 2014, MPT, the incumbent telecom operator in Myanmar, signed a Joint Operations Agreement with KSGM, whose ultimate ownership is held by KDDI Corporation (KDDI) & Sumitomo Corporation.

Together, KDDI and Sumitomo have committed to invest over $2 billion in the development of MPT and Myanmar's telecommunications industry. This commitment is among the largest historical Japanese investments in the country.

== See also ==
- Internet in Myanmar
- Telecommunications in Myanmar
- Ooredoo Myanmar
- Telenor Myanmar
- Mytel
- ATOM Myanmar
