= Myanma Port Authority =

Government agency of Myanmar

- မြန်မာ့ဆိပ်ကမ်းအာဏာပိုင်

Agency overview
- Formed: 16 March 1972 (as Burma Port Corporation); 31 March 1989 (as Myanma Port Authority)
- Preceding agency: Burma Port Corporation
- Jurisdiction: Myanmar
- Agency executive: Zaw Tun Lwin, Managing Director
- Parent department: Ministry of Transport and Communications
- Website: www.mpa.gov.mm/about/

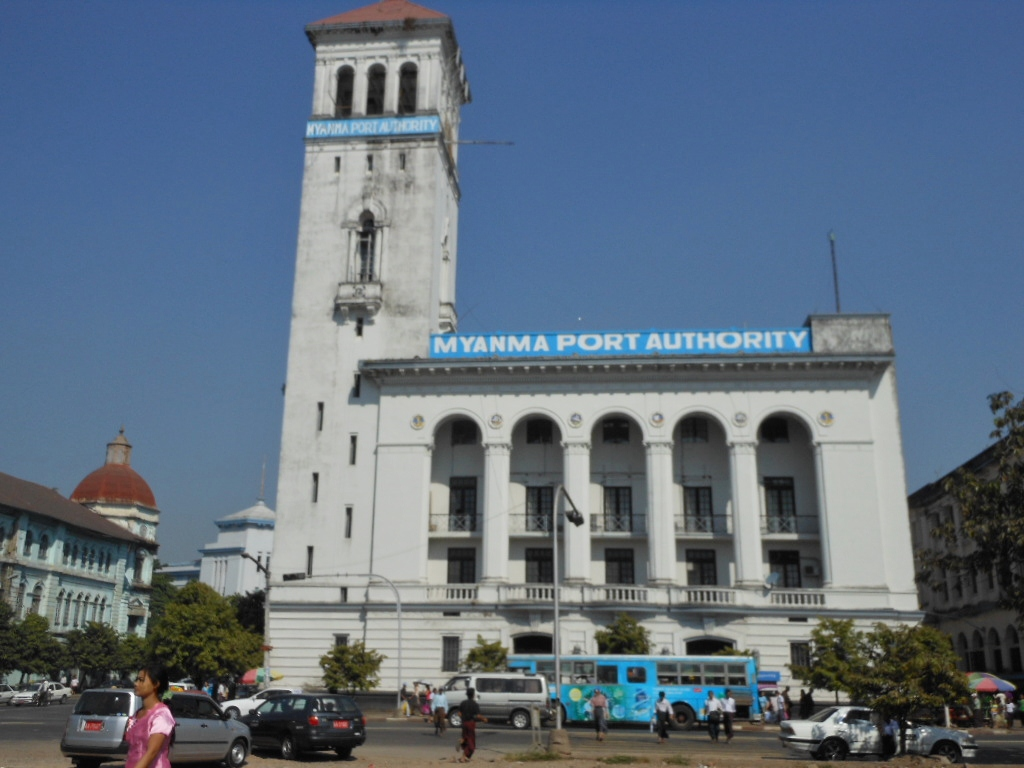
Building of the Myanma Port Authority

The Myanma Port Authority (Burmese: မြန်မာ့ဆိပ်ကမ်းအာဏာပိုင်, abbreviated MPA) is a government agency vested with the responsibility to regulate and administer the coastal ports of Myanmar. It is a department of the Ministry of Transport. The MPA was founded in 1989 and is located in Yangon.

== History ==
The modern era of the Port of Yangon began in 1880 with the Commissioners for the Port of Rangoon. The Board of Management for the Port of Rangoon was established in 1954, and the Burma Ports Corporation in 1972. The MPA was founded in 1989 to replace the Burma Ports Corporation. In March 2011, MPA began collaborating with a Chinese firm, CCCC TDC Tianjin Dredging, to begin dredging the Port of Yangon, to increase the size of vessels that can dock at the port (to 35,000 tons deadweight, up from the existing capacity of 15,000).

MPA has been involved in contracts to develop Myanmar's Special Economic Zones, including a US$8.6 billion deal to develop a deep-sea port at Dawei, by Italian-Thai Development.

It was reported in 2010 that state-owned ports run by the MPA will be privatised. The country's largest port, Thilawa Port, is currently operated by a Hong Kong-based firm, while another in Ahlone Township is run by Asia World.

On 17 March 2012, Japanese firm MOL, began a twice-weekly container service between the Port of Yangon and Singapore.

8 new Yangon area ports complete jun1st 2019.

== Headquarters ==
The Myanma Port Authority headquarters are located on Strand Road, Yangon, housed in a colonial-era building, designated in the Yangon City Heritage List.

== Ports ==
The coast of Myanmar fronts on the Indian Ocean's Bay of Bengal and Andaman Sea. Major port facilities administered by the MPA include:

- Myanmar Port Authority, Yangon
- Asia World Port Terminal, located in Ahlone Township of Yangon
- Myanmar Industrial Port, Yangon
- Myanmar International Terminal Thilawa, (MITT) 25 km from Yangon

(only facility to handle vessels with 200 metre in length, 9-metre draft and 20,000-tonnage)

- Myanmar Integrated Port Limited (MIPL), Yangon

=== Other ports ===
Other significant ports in Myanmar include: (90% of trade handle in Yangon ports not incl Thilawa as of 2019)

In Rakhine State:

- Sittwe
- Kyaukphyu
- Thandwe

In Ayeyarwady Division:

- Pathein

In Mon State:

- Mawlamyine

In Tanintharyi Division (of the Kra Isthmus):

- Dawei
- Myeik
- Kawthaung

== See also ==
- Port authority
- Port operator
- Container terminal
