= Zaw Win Shein =

Burmese businessman

- ဇော်ဝင်းရှိန်
- Born: 15 November 1978 (age 47); Hinthada Township, Irrawaddy Division, Burma (now Ayeyarwady Region, Myanmar)
- Occupation: Businessperson
- Organization: Ayeyar Hinthar Holdings
- Spouse: Shwe Yin Mar
- Parent: Thann Sein

Zaw Win Shein (Burmese: ဇော်ဝင်းရှိန်; born 1978) is a Burmese businessperson, best known for founding Ayeyar Hinthar Holdings,a major conglomerate operating in Myanmar's agriculture, import/export, construction, trading, healthcare and banking sectors in Myanmar. He was the former owner of Ayeyawady United F.C.

== Early life and education ==
Zaw Win Shein was born on 15 November 1978 in Hinthada Township, Irrawaddy Division, Burma (now Ayeyarwady Region, Myanmar).

== Career ==
At the age of 16, after his matriculation, Zaw Win Shein worked as an apprentice in his parents' agricultural products and rice export business. His father is U Thann Sein.

At 19, he borrowed capital from his parents to establish Seven Aluminium Company in 2006. In 2007, he founded Ayeyar Hinthar Trading Co., which exported rice and agricultural products, following government policy reforms. The company became one of Myanmar’s leading rice exporters, through the acquisition of lucrative licences via ties with the son of Tin Aung Myint Oo, a Burmese military general. Subsequent market reforms also expanded its vegetable oil import business. Ayeyar Hinthar Group has been listed among Myanmar’s top taxpayers since 2006.

Ayeyar Hinthar later diversified into healthcare with the founding of Victoria Hospital in 2011, the Pathein Industrial Project in 2012, and Ayeyarwady Farmers Development Bank (dba "A Bank") in 2014. In the same year, Ayeyar Hinthar Holdings Co. Ltd. was incorporated as the group’s holding company.

In 2015, the group partnered with Singapore’s Soil Build Group on the Rose Hill Condominium Project. In 2017, it launched the Y-Complex project in Yangon in partnership with Fujita Corporation, Tokyo Tatemono, and the Japan Overseas Infrastructure Investment Corporation for Transport & Urban Development (JOIN).

In 2018, the group partnered with Électricité de France (EDF), Marubeni Corporation, and Myanmar’s Ministry of Energy and Electricity on the 671 MW Shweli 3 Hydropower Project in Shan State. In 2019, Ayeyarwaddy International Industrial Port Co. Ltd. was established to facilitate agricultural exports.

== Events since 2021 ==
Zaw Win Shein has been accused of having connections to high-ranking military officials.Following the 2021 Myanmar coup d'état, he was reportedly held briefly under military supervision before being released.

Other prominent business figures were also reportedly detained around the same time, including Khin Maung Aye of CB Bank, some construction businesspeople, and owners associated with the NLD, most of whom have since been released.

In October 2022, Ooredoo finalised its sale to Nine Communications. Allegations emerged that Nine Communications is closely connected with Ayeyar Hinthar Holdings; however, Ooredoo has denied these claims. The actual owner of Ooredoo Myanmar is Jon Nathan Kyaw Thaung, not Zaw Win Shein, and the identity of this true owner only became publicly known in 2025; he owns the company through his KT Group.

Ayeyar Hinthar Holdings is involved in major development projects, including the Y Complex.
