= Telenor Myanmar =

Defunct telecommunications company of Myanmar

- Be There For You - အမြဲအတိူရှိနေသော တယ်လီနော
- Native name: တယ်လီနော မြန်မာ
- Industry: Telecommunications
- Founded: 2014
- Defunct: 2022
- Fate: Sold and rebranded following the 2021 Myanmar coup d'état
- Successor: ATOM Myanmar
- Headquarters: Yangon, Myanmar
- Number of employees: 730
- Website: www.telenor.com.mm

Telenor Myanmar (Burmese: တယ်လီနော မြန်မာ) was a telecommunications brand in Myanmar (Burma) between 2014 and 2022. It was established as a subsidiary of the Norwegian Telenor Group, and was sold off to the Lebanese M1 Group in the aftermath of the 2021 Myanmar coup d'état. After a lengthy regulatory process, Myanmar authorities approved the transaction on 18 March 2022. The company rebranded to ATOM on 8 June 2022.

== Cellular Services ==
Telenor launched its operations on September 27, 2014, in Mandalay; on October 3, 2014, in Naypyidaw; and on October 26, 2014, in Yangon. Then, Telenor launched in other cities and rural areas. The company started advertising its 3G network in mid-2015.

Telenor offered 2G, 3G, 4G (LTE) and 4.5G (LTE-A) networks, with VoLTE. Telenor launched 4G networks in July 2016. VoLTE services were added in January 2019. Telenor launched RCS in partnership with Google in February 2017 in more than 10 countries including Myanmar.

== Telenor Broadband ==
Telenor Broadband is a broadband internet service offered by Telenor that includes two main options: Telenor Fiber Internet and Telenor Home Wireless Internet. Telenor Fiber Internet was first launched in late 2016, marketed for higher speeds and reliability. As for Telenor Home Wireless Internet, it was launched in mid-2018.

== Telenor Carrier Billing ==
Telenor Carrier Billing is Telenor's implementation of Direct Carrier Billing (DCB) in Myanmar. It is believed that it was launched some time in 2020.

== History ==
In February 2013, Telenor participated in the bidding for newly available Myanmar mobile licenses. On 27 June 2013, it was announced that Telenor had been awarded one of two 15-year contracts for telecom development in Myanmar.

Telenor received its license from the Government of Myanmar to officially start mobile network operations on 5 February 2014. Its mobile network was trialed on 7 April 2014, and mobile services began operations in Mandalay on 27 September 2014. Telenor's network subsequently launched in Naypyidaw on 4 October 2014, and full coverage of Myanmar was achieved on 26 October 2014. Telenor provides mobile voice and internet services using 2G and 3G GSM technology. Its network is LTE ready and plans to cover 90% of the Myanmar population within 5 years of operations

In June 2014, Telenor Myanmar helped the Burmese Wikipedia community to hold their first joint workshop to recruit new volunteers. The Burmese Wikipedia Forum was held at Dagon University with the help of Telenor Myanmar in July 2014, attracting over 2,000 people, including students.

In November 2014, Telenor and Yoma Bank announced their cooperation to provide mobile banking to Myanmar. The aim of their cooperation is to provide access to financial services to people who do not have bank accounts. As of June 2019, it had more than 19 million subscribers.

=== Forced shutdowns ===
The junta-controlled Ministry of Transport and Communications (MOTC) made at least 200 requests to Telenor over the past 12 months for information, including records of calls, call locations and the last known location of a number, a source with inside knowledge of the situation told Myanmar Now.

The company complied with all of these requests, as well as with instructions to shut down specified mobile numbers, the source said. For several months, ending in September 2019, Telenor Myanmar was ordered to shut off service to Maungdaw, Buthidaung, Rathedaung and Myebon. In February 2020, the Ministry of Transport and Communications ordered Telenor to shut off service to five townships in Rakhine State and Chin State.

Similar requests for information and forced shutdowns have been made to all other mobile operators and internet service providers in Myanmar, but none of the other companies have ever publicly admitted to this.

=== 2021 coup ===
In the aftermath of the 2021 Myanmar coup d'état, Telenor faced increasing pressure from the State Administration Council, the military junta, to activate intercept equipment to surveil and monitor its 18 million customers. In May 2021, Telenor was forced to write off USD$780 million investment in Myanmar. On 8 July 2021, Telenor announced it would sell Telenor Myanmar for US$105 million to M1 Group, an investment company based in Lebanon, founded by Taha and Najib Mikati. The sale was approved by Burmese regulatory authorities and ultimately by the Myanmar Investment Commission (MIC) on 18 March 2022. The first tranche of the transaction was completed on 25 March 2022 and operational control handed over to the new owner.

In February 2022, reports emerged that Shwe Byain Phyu (SBP) would own 80% of Telenor Myanmar with Lebanese M1 Group owning the remaining shares. Shwe Byain Phyu and M1 Group have formed a joint venture, Investcom, to take over Telenor operations in Myanmar. The sale prompted significant scrutiny from Burmese civil society over data privacy concerns, given SBP's links to the Burmese military. Legal experts and activists have urged Telenor to protect customer metadata, by putting the sale on hold or by deleting the data before the transaction is completed. On 10 February, Duwa Lashi La, the acting president of the National Unity Government called on the acting prime minister of Norway to intervene and prevent the sale.

The sale of Telenor Myanmar to M1 Group was approved by Myanmar authorities on 18 March, transferred to new ownership on 25 March, and subsequently rebranded to ATOM on 8 June 2022.

== See also ==
- Ooredoo Myanmar
- Mytel
- Myanma Posts and Telecommunications
- Telecommunications in Myanmar
