= Myanmar Economic Corporation =

Burmese military corporation

- Native name: မြန်မာ့စီးပွားရေး ကော်ပိုရေးရှင်း
- Industry: Conglomerate
- Founded: February 1997; 29 years ago
- Founder: Ministry of Defence (Burma)
- Headquarters: Yangon, Myanmar
- Key people: Nyo Saw, chairman
- Subsidiaries: Innwa Bank
- Website: www.mecwebsite.com

The Myanmar Economic Corporation (Burmese: မြန်မာ့စီးပွားရေး ကော်ပိုရေးရှင်း; abbreviated MEC) is one of the two major conglomerates and holding companies operated by the Burmese military, the other being the Myanma Economic Holdings Limited. The U.S. Treasury Dept. reports that MEC "is a holding company with businesses in the mining, manufacturing, and telecommunications sectors, as well as companies that supply natural resources to the military, and operate factories producing goods for use by the military." As of August 2022, Nyo Saw is the chairman of MEC.

Founded in 1997 by Lt General Tin Hla to establish profitable heavy industries that can provide the Burmese military access to supplies of important materials (e.g. cement and rubber), MEC's operations are shrouded in secrecy. Revenues generated from MEC have strengthened the Burmese military's autonomy from civilian oversight, and has contributed to the military's financial operations in "a wide array of international human rights and humanitarian law violations."

== Ownership ==
MEC is owned by the Burmese military, and is influenced by senior Tatmadaw leaders. Along with Union of Myanmar Economic Holdings (UMEHL), MEC is widely observed to generate most of the Burmese military's operating revenue, which are not held accountable to the Burmese parliament, the Pyidaungsu Hluttaw.

== Leadership ==
MEC is led by high-ranking Burmese military officials, including members of the ruling military junta, the State Administration Council, including Moe Myint Tun, a MEC director. The former Vice-President of Burma, Tin Aung Myint Oo, is a former Myanmar Economic Corporation chairman.

== Business interests ==
In 2009, MEC had 21 factories, including 4 steel plants, a bank, a cement plant and an insurance monopoly. Its headquarters are located on Ahlon Road in Yangon's Ahlon Township. MEC has remained on the United States' list of sanctioned companies due to its affiliation to the Burmese military. MEC also operates Innwa Bank, one of Burma's few banking chains. A subsidiary of MEC, Star High Public Company, owns 28% of Mytel, one of Myanmar's largest telecommunications company, in a joint venture with Viettel.

MEC is operated under the Ministry of Defence's Directorate of Defence Procurement (DPP), with its private shares exclusively owned by active-duty military personnel.

The corporation's capital was established through revenues generated from the public auctioning of state-owned enterprises throughout the 1990s. Through joint ventures with foreign companies and mergers with smaller companies, MEC has positioned itself as one of Burma's largest corporations.

In 2000, MEC launched Cybermec Information Technology Center, an IT venture.

== History ==
Following the February, 2021 Myanmar coup d'état, in which the Tatmadaw seized power from the elected civilian government, the United States sanctioned MEC, March 25, 2021, for the company's association with, and support of, the Tatmadaw, -- impounding U.S.-held assets of the company, and forbidding U.S. nationals from doing business with them.

== See also ==
- Myanmar Economic Holdings Limited
