= U9 Myanmar =

Telecommunications company in Myanmar

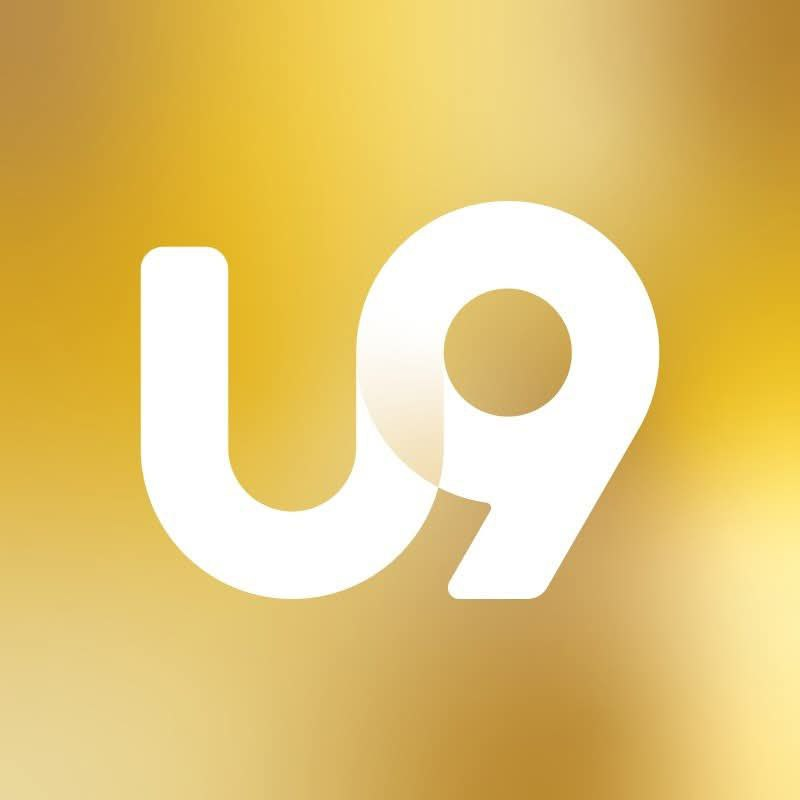
- Better Together - အတူတုဆိုပိုကောင်းလို့ ယူနိုင်းနဲ့ ချိတ်ဆက်လိုက်ရအာင်
- Native name: ယူနိုင်း မြန်မာ
- Industry: Telecommunications
- Founded: 2013; 13 years ago (as Ooredoo Myanmar with the slogan "Enjoy the Internet" and "Upgrade Your World" from 2022-2025)
- Headquarters: Yangon, Myanmar
- Key people: Caroline Yin Yin Htay (CEO)
- Parent: Nine Communications Pvt. Ltd.
- Website: u9.com.mm

U9 Myanmar (Burmese: ယူနိုင်း မြန်မာ, formerly known as Ooredoo Myanmar, Burmese: အူရီဒူး မြန်မာ), or simply U9, is a telecommunications company in Myanmar.

== History ==
In June 2013, Ooredoo was chosen as one of the two successful applicants among 90 bidders to be awarded a license to launch telecom operations in Myanmar, considered one of the Asia's last remaining greenfield telecom markets. Formal licenses were granted in January 2014, and Ooredoo pledged an investment of $15 billion to develop Myanmar's telecoms sector, with plans to cover 75% of the population in five years.

Ooredoo Myanmar logo (2022–2025)

Former Ooredoo Myanmar logo (2014–2022)

Following the 2021 Myanmar coup d'état, many foreign companies exited the Burmese market, including competitor Norwegian-owned Telenor Myanmar, due to increasing pressure from military authorities. On 7 September 2022, Ooredoo signed an agreement to sell Ooredoo Myanmar to Singapore vehicle Nine Communications Pte. Ltd, at a value of US$576 million, subject to Burmese regulatory approvals. Nine Communications is the subsidiary of zLink Family Office and Nyan Win.

In September 2025, at least three media outlets reported that the new controlling owner behind the company was Jonathan Kyaw Thaung (of KT Group). Similarly, an article published on 23 October 2022 by the independent outlet People's Spring News stated that “the group behind Nyan Win is not Zaw Win Shein or the Ayeyar Hinthar Group, but a more powerful and financially resourceful entity. The main owners have kept their identities concealed, making the ownership structure increasingly opaque. .

The announcement of Ooredoo's sale prompted sharp criticism from rights groups, including Access Now, for putting the personal data of 9 million customers in the hands of the Burmese military. The company officially rebranded as U9 on 20 September 2025.

== Leadership ==
In 2019, Ooredoo Myanmar appointed Rajeev Sethi as its CEO. Right before the sale, Ooredoo appointed their Chief of Sales and Distribution Htar Thant Zin as Acting CEO on November 1, 2022. After the sale to Nine Communications, the CEO of Ooredoo Myanmar (now U9) is Caroline Yin Yin Htay.

== See also ==
- Telenor Myanmar
- Mytel
- Myanma Posts and Telecommunications
- Telecommunications in Myanmar
