= Telecommunications in Myanmar =

Myanmar began liberalisation of its telecommunications market in 2013.

== Telecommunication networks ==
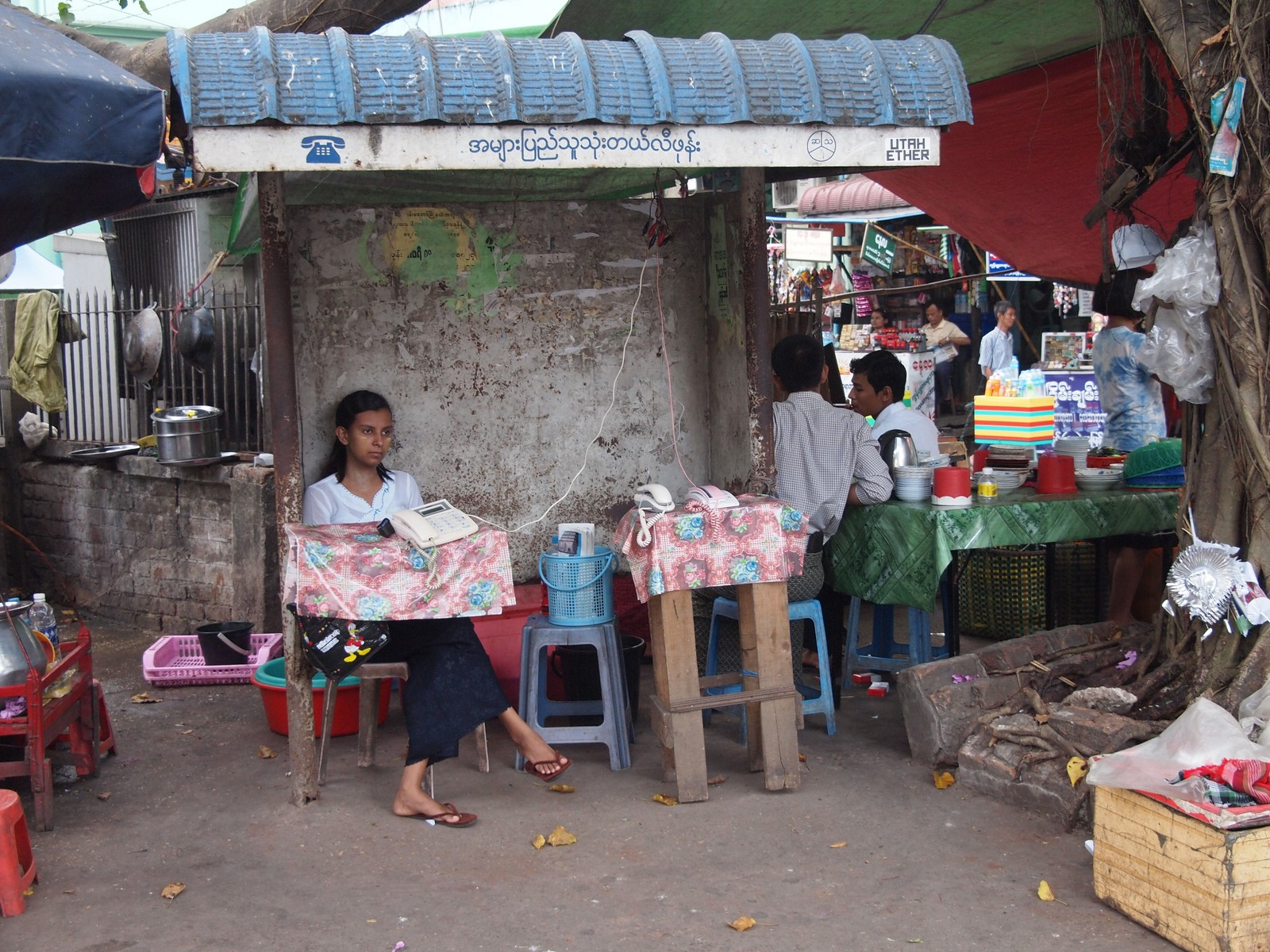
Private street telephone post in Myanmar

Previously, Myanma Post and Telecommunication (MPT) had a monopoly in the country. In 2013, the government started taking steps to open up the telecommunications market, issuing licences to new service providers. Consulting firm Roland Berger supported the government in the liberalisation and tendering process. In 2014, Qatar-based Ooredoo and Norwegian Telenor through their local subsidiaries – respectively Ooredoo Myanmar and Telenor Myanmar – entered the market, resulting in the reduction of consumer prices, rapid growth in the number of subscribers, as well as the expansion of the country's infrastructure. In November 2015, Ericsson named Myanmar the world's fourth fastest-growing mobile market. As of June 2015, Myanmar has a mobile phone penetration rate of 54.6%, up from less than 10% in 2012. On 12 January 2017, Mytel (Telecom International Myanmar Co., Ltd.) received a licence for the provision of telecommunication services, officially becoming the 4th operator in Myanmar.

=== Telephone system ===
- General assessment: meets minimum requirements for local and intercity service for business and government
- Domestic: system barely capable of providing basic service; cellular phone system is grossly underdeveloped with a subscribership base of less than 1 per 100 persons
- International: country code - 95; landing point for the SEA-ME-WE 3 optical telecommunications submarine cable that provides links to Asia, the Middle East, and Europe; satellite earth stations - 2, Intelsat (Indian Ocean) and ShinSat (2007)

Bids were offered for two fresh telecom licences by the Myanmar government. The deadline was set to be 8 February 2013. The licences were expected to be issued in June and carry a contract duration of up to 20 years. Two more licences were expected to be offered following this round of bidding.

According to government statistics, 5.4 million of Myanmar's 60 million population had a mobile phone subscription at the end of 2012, giving the country a mobile penetration of 9 per cent.

According to official figures released in mid-2012, Myanmar had 857 base transceiver stations (BTS) for 1,654,667 local GSM mobile users, 188 BTSs for 225,617 local WCDMA mobile users, 366 BTSs for 633,569 local CDMA-450 mobile users, and 193 BTSs for 341,687 CDMA-800 mobile users. Huawei who has built 40 per cent of the towers and ZTE has built 60 per cent in Myanmar, which amounts to 1500 across the country, said it has built the towers mostly in Yangon, Mandalay, and Naypyidaw.

The Myanmar Telecommunications Operator Tender Evaluation and Selection Committee selected Norwegian Telenor Group and Ooredoo of Qatar as winners of the bidding, for the two telecom licences issued by the government of Myanmar. The licences allow the operators to build and operate a nationwide wireless network for 15 years. Ooredoo began selling low-price SIM cards at a price of US$1.5 in Yangon, Mandalay, and Naypyidaw in August 2014. Prior to 2012, during military rule, SIM cards cost USD 1,500.

Mytel is the fourth telecom firm in Myanmar. It is a joint venture between Myanmar Army-backed Star High Public Co Ltd, which holds 48 per cent, Vietnam's Ministry of Defence owned Viettel Group, which holds 28 per cent, and Myanmar National Telecom Holding Public Ltd, a group of 11 local companies with a combined 23-percent stake. Commander-in-chief Senior General Min Aung Hlaing stated at the opening ceremony of Mytel on 11 February 2018 that it will cover 93 per cent of the 2G networks and 60 per cent of the 4G networks of Myanmar after installing towers and stations across the country.

== Media ==
- Radio broadcast stations
  - AM 2, FM 9, shortwave 3 (2015)
- Television broadcast stations:
  - 6 (2015)

Press

1. Kyehmon (Burmese: ကြေးမုံ) - state-run daily
2. The New Light of Myanmar (Burmese: Myanma A-lin) - English and Burmese language organ of SPDC
3. The Myanmar Times (Burmese: Myanma Taing) - private-run English-language weekly
4. Myanmar Business Today - the country's first and the only private-run business weekly

Television

1. MRTV state-run, operated by Myanmar Government - Broadcasts With DVB-T2 System. Including 14 TV Channels Burmese, Arakanese, Shan, Karen, Kachin, Kayah, Chin, Mon and English
2. MITV - Showing about Myanmar to around the World.
3. Myawady TV army-run network

Broadcasts 7 Free Digital Channel available in Naypyidaw, Yangon & Mandalay.

1. SKYNET Largest Pay TV Service In Myanmar. Providing 110 TV Channels (Local & International) Including 10 High Definition Channel. Broadcasts With DTH system on Apstar 7 Satellite. SKYNET Have Official Broadcaster To England Premier League, Spain LaLiga, Italy Serie-A, France League 1 In 2015/16 Season.
2. 4TV - Second Largest Pay TV Service In Myanmar. operated by Forever Group.

Providing Free to air Channels, Local & International Pay TV Channels, and High Definition Channels. 4TV Has Only Broadcasts 2 Way With DTH and DVB-T2 In Myanmar.

1. Democratic Voice of Burma - Activists from the 88 Generation launched it. Based in Norway, it makes both TV and Radio broadcasts

Radio

1. Radio Myanmar - state-run, operated by Myanmar TV and Radio Department
2. Thazin Radio - Military operated station
3. City FM - entertainment-based, operated by Yangon City Development Committee
4. Bagan FM
5. Cherry FM - Commercial station broadcasting music based programs to main cities
6. Mandalay FM
7. Padamyar FM
8. Pyinsawaddy FM
9. Shwe FM
10. Democratic Voice of Burma - opposition station based in Norway, broadcasts via shortwave

News agency

1. Myanmar News Agency (MNA) - state-run

== Internet ==
The government allowed unrestricted access to the Internet for some years following the telecoms liberalisation. Many people were using the internet freely, often with widely available smart phones.

Myanmar Teleport (formerly Bagan Cybertech), Information Technology Central Services (ITCS), and the state-owned Myanmar Post and Telecommunication (MPT) are two of the Internet service providers in Myanmar. Internet cafés are common in the larger cities of the country. Satellite (VSAT) internet connection is also available from Skynet, a satellite television provider, and another (VSAT) Operator Com & Com.

According to MPT's official statistics as of July 2010, the country had over 400,000 Internet users (0.8% of the population) with the vast majority of the users located in the two largest cities, Yangon and Mandalay. More recent figures are hard to find, but the widespread use of smart phones and tablets with cellular modems on the 3G and 4G networks means that internet usage is likely to be far higher than the figures from 2010 indicate.

Although the internet appears largely unrestricted, Myanmar experience internet shut downs during politically sensitive times. In 2007, the military government shutdown the internet during the Saffron Revolution for a few days to restrict information from within the country to be disseminated to international media. In 2019 June to February 2020, a few townships from Rakkhine and Chin State are facing internet shut downs as ordered by the Ministry of Transport and Communications.

On 3 February 2021, 3G and 4G data network was restored in Rakhine and Chin States.

Starting from dawn of 1 February 2021, there're re-restrictions and outage to access to the internet by the Military Government because of 2021 Myanmar coup d'état. The government banned and blocked social media, including Facebook, Twitter, Instagram and WhatsApp, western news agency websites and also Wikipedia.

Starting from 16 February 2021, the internet was shut down from 1 a.m. to 9 a.m. in nationwide.

On 22 February 2021, the internet was shut down only in Yangon from 12 a.m. to 12 p.m. while other states and regions were only from 1 a.m. to 9 a.m.

== See also ==
- Censorship in Burma
