= Myanma Economic Holdings Limited =

State-owned conglomerate in Myanmar

- Native name: မြန်မာ့ စီးပွားရေး ဦးပိုင် လီမိတက်
- Industry: Conglomerate
- Founded: February 1990; 36 years ago
- Founder: Ministry of Defence (Burma)
- Headquarters: Yangon, Myanmar
- Owner: Burmese military personnel (60%); Directorate of Defence Procurement (40%)
- Subsidiaries: Myawaddy Bank; Myawaddy Tours & Travel; Myawaddy Enterprises Group; Pyininbin Industrial Park
- Website: www.mehl.com.mm

Myanma Economic Holdings Public Company Limited (Burmese: မြန်မာ့စီးပွားရေးဦးပိုင်အများနှင့်သက်ဆိုင်သောကုမ္ပဏီလီမိတက်, abbreviated MEHL or ဦးပိုင် in Burmese) is one of two major conglomerates run by the Burmese military (known as Tatmadaw), through the Ministry of Defence, the other being the Myanmar Economic Corporation (MEC). MEHL business interests include banking, construction, mining, agriculture, tobacco and food.

MEHL is owned by the Burmese military, and current and former Tatmadaw personnel, and is influenced by senior Tatmadaw leaders. Rank-and-file soldiers are required to invest a significant portion of their salaries in MEHL shares, and generally receive an annual dividend in September based on the conglomerate's annual profits. Revenues generated from MEHL have strengthened the Burmese military's autonomy from civilian oversight, and has contributed to the military's financial operations in "a wide array of international human rights and humanitarian law violations."

UMEHL also operates Myawaddy Bank and the Burmese military's pension fund. The headquarters are located on Maha Bandula Road in Yangon's Botataung Township.

== History ==
The Union of Myanmar Economic Holdings Limited (abbreviated UMEHL or UMEH) was established in February 1990 under the Special Companies Act as the economic arm of the Burmese military, during a period of privatisation and transition from a socialist command economy, with an initial capital of US$1.6 billion. UMEHL was established to generate profits from light industry and the trade of commercial goods.

In the 2000s, several state-owned enterprises, including sugar factories, were transferred to the control of MEHL and MEC. By 2007, MEHL wholly owned seventy-seven firms, nine subsidiaries and seven affiliated companies. Its shares are available to military units, active duty and retired military and veterans' groups, returning a 30% profit since 1995.

The MEHL conglomerate is jointly owned by two military departments; 40% of shares are owned by the Directorate of Defence Procurement while 60% of shares are owned by active and veteran defence personnel, including high-ranking military officials of the former ruling military junta, the State Peace and Development Council (SPDC) and veterans organisations. MEHL is exempt from commercial and profit taxes.

In 2010, MEHL opened Ruby Mart, a 50,000-square-foot (4,600 m^{2}) 5-storey shopping complex in Yangon's Kyauktada Township, in a building that once housed the Ministry of Commerce's Myanmar Agricultural Produce Trading. Between 2009 and 2012, MEHL benefited immensely during a mass privatization of state-owned enterprises and assets, acquiring the Bo Aung Kyaw port terminal and the Myanma Five Star Line in the process.

In May 2012, when the United States suspended sanctions against Burma (Myanmar), sanctions against MEHL were kept in place, because of its affiliation to the Burmese Tatmadaw.

In 2016, after the National League for Democracy assumed power, MEHL privatized its operations and dropped "Union" from its name. In doing so, MEHL diverted the company's profits away from the national budget and direct civilian oversight.

In May 2020, the Ever Flow River Group, which is tied to MEHL, was listed on the Yangon Stock Exchange.

In June 2020, the Burmese government launched an investigation over conflicts of interest within the two public agencies, the Myanma Port Authority and customs authority, whose managing director and director-general respectively, also sit on MEHL's board of directors. The practice of appointing MEHL directors to run these trade agencies has been in place since 1990.

Following the February 2021 Myanmar coup d'état, in which the Tatmadaw seized power from the elected civilian government, the United States sanctioned MEHL, for its association with and support of the Tatmadaw, impounding U.S.-held assets of the company, and forbidding U.S. nationals from doing business with them. The United Kingdom promptly followed with sanctions of its own. The American and British sanctions, however, were expected to have little impact, because Myanmar's principal trading partners, in Asia, declined to impose sanctions.

== Leadership ==
MEHL is led by high-ranking Burmese military officials, including members of the ruling military junta, the State Administration Council. Min Aung Hlaing and Soe Win serve as the Chairman and Vice-Chairman of MEHL’s Patrons Group, which oversees the MEHL's board of directors, while Mya Tun Oo, Tin Aung San, and Maung Maung Kyaw are also members of the Patrons Group, and Aung Lin Dwe and Moe Myint Tun are MEHL directors.

== Economic interests ==
The conglomerate has also been involved in lucrative partnerships with drug lords. MEHL has a monopoly on the country's gems sector and also has a significant portfolio in various industries, including banking, tourism, real estate, transportation, metals, construction, mining, agriculture, tobacco and food. With its affiliation to the Burmese military, which directly ruled the country for almost 50 years, MEHL has exclusive access to secure preferential contracts with foreign firms. Most FDI in Burma is done through joint ventures with MEHL. MEHL is one of 18 Burmese firms involved in the development of the 50,000 acres (20,000 ha) Thilawa Area near Yangon.

Among its subsidiaries include:

- Bandula Transportation
  - Parami Bus
- Myawaddy Trading
- Five Stars Ship Company
- Myawaddy Bank
- Virginia Tobacco Company Limited
- Myawaddy Tours & Travel
- Myawaddy Enterprises Group
- Pyininbin Industrial Park (in North Yangon's suburbs)
  - UMEH Textile
- Jade mines (in Kachin State)
- Ruby and sapphire mines (in Shan State)

=== Myanmar Brewery ===
MEHL has a 45% share in Myanmar Brewery Limited (MBL), which manufactures Kirin Beer, Myanmar Beer, ABC Stout and Anchor Beer. Myanmar Brewery Limited is a joint venture between MEHL and Japan's Kirin Company, which bought the 55% stake of Fraser and Neave Ltd in 2015. Prior to the acquisition, MEHL was involved in a controversial attempt to acquire a majority stake in Myanmar Brewery, which controls over 2/3 of the country's beer market.

Japanese beverage maker Kirin Company owns half of the Myanmar Brewery and Mandalay Brewery, in a business partnership with MEHL. A United Nations report regarding MEHL's ties ownership by the Burmese military surfaced in 2019, which prompted sharp criticism over Kirin's financial relationship with the Burmese military. In 2017, Kirin's subsidiary, Myanmar Brewery Limited, made $30,000 in donations toward the Burmese military's clearance operations in Rakhine State. In response, Kirin launched an independent probe to reassess the business partnership.

In February 2021, Kirin announced it would cut ties with Military controlled Myanmar.

== See also ==
- Tatmadaw
- Myanmar Economic Corporation
- Ministry of Defence
