= Department of Civil Aviation (Myanmar) =

Government agency of Myanmar

- လေကြောင်း ပို့ဆောင်ရေး ညွှန်ကြားမှု ဦးစီးဌာန
- Seal of the Department of Civil Aviation

Agency overview
- Preceding agency: British Overseas Airways Corporation (BOAC)
- Jurisdiction: Government of Myanmar
- Headquarters: Yangon International Airport
- Website: www.dca.gov.mm

The Department of Civil Aviation, Myanmar (Burmese: လေကြောင်း ပို့ဆောင်ရေး ညွှန်ကြားမှု ဦးစီးဌာန; abbreviated DCA) is an agency of the government of Burma responsible for regulating aviation safety, aviation traffic and management of the country's two main airports. It is subordinate to the Ministry of Transport.

== Background history ==
During the pre-independence period, the British Overseas Airways Corporation (BOAC) took responsibility for carrying out all of Myanmar's civil aviation functions and after independence it was considered not appropriate to have the aeronautical communications functions under the management of BOAC and through the efforts of efficient young communication engineers, the International Aeradio Limited (IAL) was contacted and Myanmar's aeronautical communication functions were contracted to IAL and so the foundation for the future of Myanmar's civil aviation communication sector was laid.

With a view for the systematic development of international civil aviation, the Chicago Convention was signed at Chicago on 4 April 1947 and the International Civil Aviation Organization (ICAO) was formed. Myanmar became a member state of the ICAO on 8 August 1948.

== Organisation structure ==
The Department of Civil Aviation (DCA) is headed by the Director General (DG) and is a subordinate organisation under the Ministry of Transport (MOT), the Government of the Republic of the Union of Myanmar. The DCA organised in the following structure;

- Regulatory Body
  - Airworthiness Division
  - Flight Standards Division
  - Air Navigation Safety Division
  - Aerodrome Standards and Safety Division
  - Aviation Security Division
- Service Providers
  - Civil Aviation Training Institute
  - Yangon International Airport
  - Mandalay International Airport
  - 30 Aerodrome Operators
  - Communication, navigation and surveillance Division
  - Air Traffic Management Division
  - Aeronautical Information Services Division
- Supporting Body
  - Air Transport Division
  - Administration and Planning Division
