= Ministry of Transport (Myanmar) =

- ပို့ဆောင်ရေးဝန်ကြီးဌာန
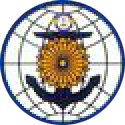
- Seal of the Ministry of Transport

Agency overview
- Formed: April 7, 2026; 7 months ago
- Preceding agency: Ministry of Transport and Communications (Myanmar)
- Dissolved: March 30, 2016
- Jurisdiction: Government of Myanmar
- Headquarters: Naypyidaw; 19.7777527°N 96.1355135°E
- Minister responsible: Mya Tun Oo
- Parent agency: Union Government of Myanmar
- Child agencies: Department of Transport; Department of Marine Administration; Department of Waterways; Department of Civil Aviation; Institute of Marine Technology; Inland Water Transport; Myanmar Five Star Line; Myanma Airways; Myanma Dockyards; Myanma Port Authority
- Website: www.mot.gov.mm

The Ministry of Transport (Burmese: ပို့ဆောင်ရေးဝန်ကြီးဌာန, 'MOT') is a ministry of the Union Government of Myanmar. The ministry is responsible for overseeing national transport policy, transportation infrastructure development, and national enterprises handling land, sea, and air travel and transportation. Under the second cabinet of Min Aung Hlaing, the Ministry of Transport and Communications was split into Ministry of Transport and Ministry of Digital Development and Communications.

The transport ministry portfolio includes the Myanmar National Airlines and Myanma Port Authority, and Department of Civil Aviation.

== Background history ==
When Myanmar declared independence, the Ministry of Waterways and Civil Aviation and Ministry of Transport, Posts and Telecommunications were formed. In 1961, the above-mentioned ministries were merged and reconstituted as the Ministry of Transport and Communications with 11 organizations. In 1972, it was again reconstituted as the Ministry of Transport and Communications. It consisted of 17 organisations.

In 1992, it was reconstituted into three ministries, namely Ministry of Transport, Ministry of Rail Transportation and Ministry of Communications, Posts and Telegraphs.

When the Ministry of Transport was first formed, it had four departments, five enterprises and a training institute, totalling ten organisations. The Meteorology and Hydrology Department was added to the Ministry of Transport on 20 August 1999. Myanmar Maritime University was inaugurated on 1 August 2002. Currently there are five departments, five enterprises, a university and a college, totalling 12 organisations under the Ministry of Transport.

== Departments ==
- Department of Civil Aviation
- Department of Marine Administration
- Department of Meteorology and Hydrology
- Directorate of Water Resources and Improvement of River Systems
- Myanmar National Airlines
- Myanma Five Star Line
- Myanma Port Authority
- Inland Water Transport
- Myanma Shipyards
- Myanmar Maritime University
- Myanmar Mercantile Marine College

== Policies ==
The following transport policies are laid down to fully support the economic development of the nation:

- To develop and fully utilise transport capacities to contribute towards the realisation of an economically strong, modern and developed nation.
- To fulfill transport requirements, and to extend and maintain the transport infrastructure to be able to fully support increased production from other economic sectors and meet growing public and social demands.
- To ensure smooth and secure domestic and international transport systems as well as contribute towards the development of border areas and national races and the development of tourism.
- To enable all-weather river transportation by maintenance and preservation of natural resources.
- To develop air and maritime transport infrastructures in line with international standards for environmental protection.
- To enhance the transport sector through human resources development and upgrade expertise in management and advancing modern technology.
- To abide by international conventions, acts, laws, rules and regulations with respect to the transport sector.
- To develop domestic and international transportation and actively take a key role in the implementation of a national multi-modal transport system.
- To plan for implementation of implement national, sub-regional and international transport networks.

== Leadership ==
=== Union Ministers ===
Union Ministers (2026-present)
No	Name	Start	End	President	Deputy
1	Mya Tun Oo	10 April 2026	Incumbent	Min Aung Hlaing	1. Aung Myaing; 2. Tun Lu
