= Burmese Wikipedia =

Burmese-language edition of Wikipedia

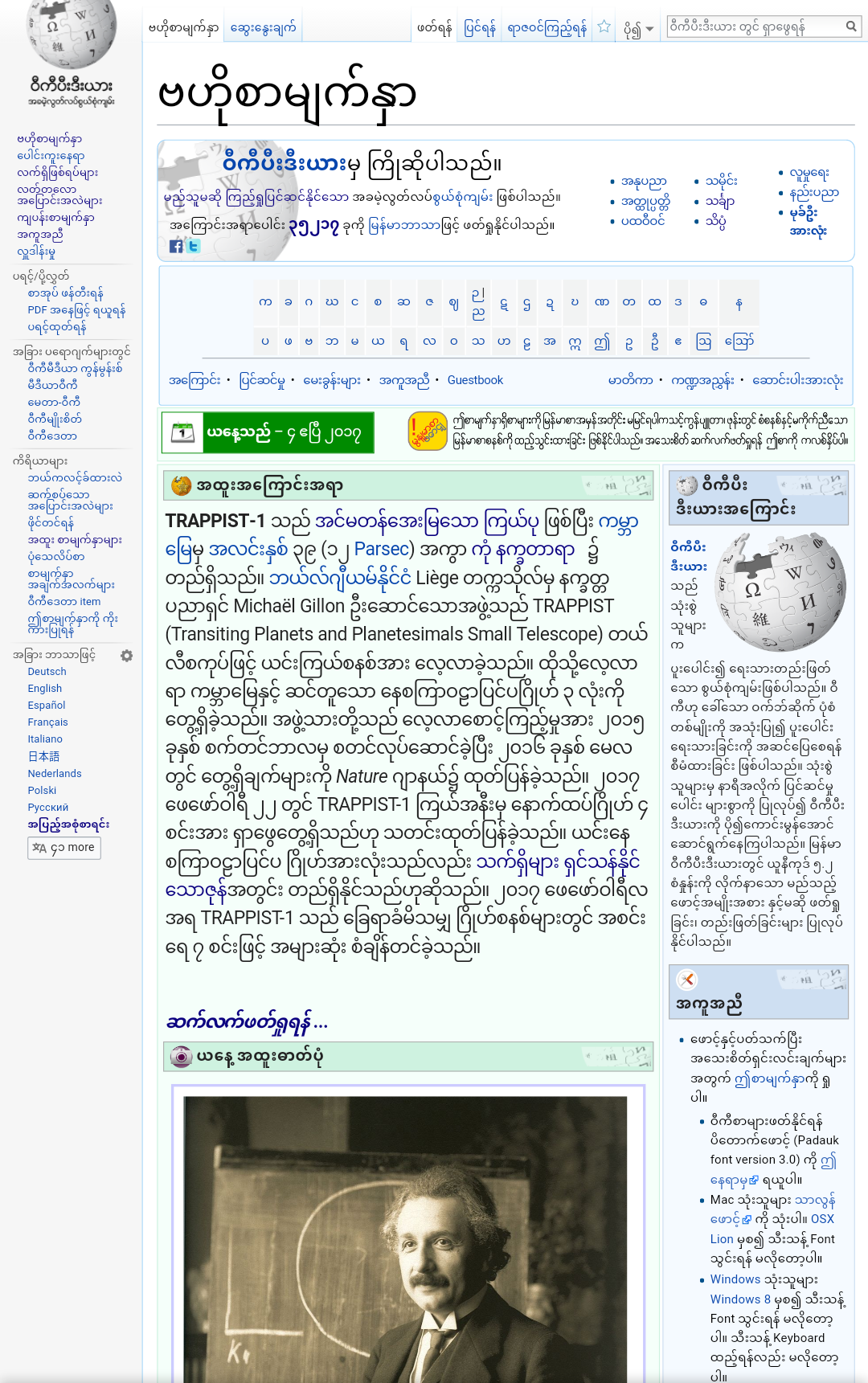
- Screenshot
- Website type: Internet encyclopedia project
- Available in: Burmese
- Owner: Wikimedia Foundation
- Creator: Burmese Wikipedia community
- Website: my.wikipedia.org
- Commercial: No
- Registration: Optional
- Launched: 30 July 2004
- Current status: Active but banned in Myanmar
- Content license: Creative Commons Attribution/ Share-Alike 4.0 (most text also dual-licensed under GFDL); Media licensing varies

The Burmese Wikipedia (Burmese: မြန်မာဝီကီပီးဒီးယား pronounced [mjəmà wɪkɨˈpiːdiə]) is the Burmese language edition of the free online encyclopedia Wikipedia. This edition was started in July 2004, and has 112,437 articles as of 22 September 2026.

As of September 2026, there are about 145,000 users, 4 admins and 2,912 files on the Burmese Wikipedia, ranking 74th by article count.

== History ==
=== Timeline ===
- 2004: Burmese Wikipedia launched.
- 2005: Some of Burmese Wikipedians joined and started writing.
- 2008: Content grew drastically.
- 2010: First Burmese Wikipedia workshop held at Bangkok, Thailand with people from Wikimedia Foundation, local and international Unicode experts and Burmese Wikipedians.
- 2012: Burmese Wikipedia was introduced at Barcamp Yangon.

=== Events and promotions ===
Burmese Wikipedia
| Articles | 112437 |
| Files | 2912 |
| Edits | 1054104 |
| Users | 144961 |
| Active users | 257 |
| Admins | 4 |

The Myanmar Computer Professionals Association had launched Wikipedia Myanmar project with the aim of expanding Wikipedia in 2010.

The Burmese Wikipedia community had held their first joint workshop in Yangon, Burma (Myanmar) with the help of Telenor Myanmar in June 2014 to recruit new volunteers. The Burmese Wikipedia Forum was held at Dagon University in July 2014 attracting over 2,000 people, including students.

== Challenges ==
The majority of Burmese internet users used the non-Unicode Zawgyi font so they have difficulty viewing Burmese Wikipedia before 2019.

On February 19, 2021, Myanmar's junta military authorities blocked access to all language versions of Wikipedia as part of a broader crackdown on internet freedom following the 2021 coup. Due to this, Burmese Wikipedia have struggled with significant participation.
