= Tokyo Tatemono =

Japanese real estate company

Tokyo Tatemono Co., Ltd.

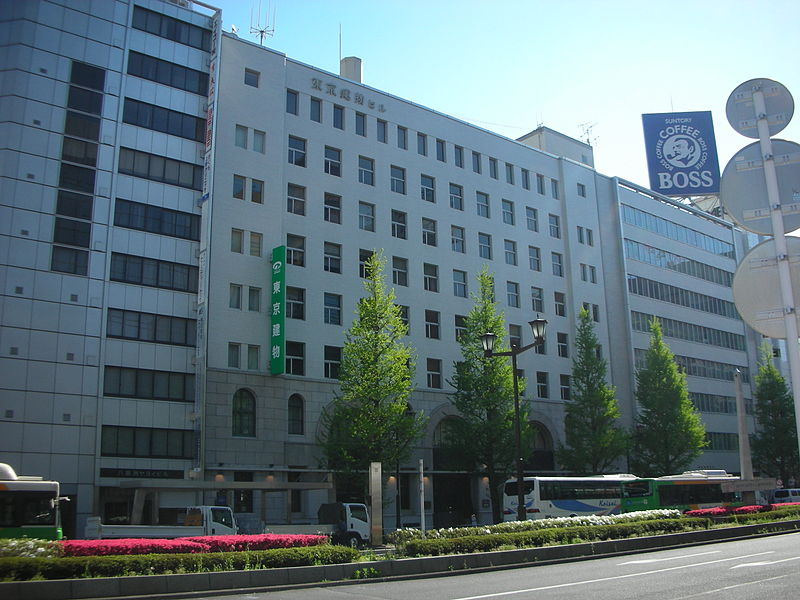
- Tokyo Tatemono Headquarters
- Native name: 東京建物株式会社
- Romanized name: Tōkyō Tatemono Kabushiki-gaisha
- Company type: Public (K.K)
- Traded as: TYO: 8804
- Industry: Real estate
- Founded: October 1, 1896; 129 years ago
- Headquarters: Yaesu, Chūō, Tokyo, Japan
- Key people: Yasuda Zenjirō
- Number of employees: 422 (2014)
- Subsidiaries: Tokyo Tatemono Real Estate Sales; Nihon Parking; Prime Place; Tsunagu Network Communications
- Website: www.tatemono.com

Tokyo Tatemono Co., Ltd. (東京建物株式会社, Tōkyō Tatemono Kabushiki-gaisha) is a Japanese real estate company. It is listed on the Nikkei 225. Founded in 1896, Tokyo Tatemono has its headquarters in Yaesu, Chūō, Tokyo, and its current president is Hajime Sakuma. It develops, sells, and manages commercial buildings and facilities, condominia, and houses. The company is also involved in the development and management of hotels, leisure centers, vacation facilities, golf courses, resort places, and restaurants, as wells as renovating buildings and condominia. It has expanded its investments into China and is considering expansion into Southeast Asia. The company estimates that the company may reach an operating profit of 10 billion yen by fiscal 2014.
