= Hlaingthaya massacre =

2021 massacre in Yangon, Myanmar

- Part of the 2021 Myanmar coup d'état and subsequent Myanmar protests (2021–present)
- Site of the massacre (Myanmar)
- Location: 16°52′40″N 96°04′33″E; Hlaingthaya Township, Yangon
- Date: 14 March 2021
- Deaths: 65+ civilians
- Perpetrators: Myanmar Army; Myanmar Police Force
- Charges: None

The Hlaingthaya massacre was a mass killing of civilians on 14 March 2021, in Hlaingthaya Township (also spelt Hlaing Tharyar and Hlinethaya), Yangon, Myanmar. During the massacre, Myanmar Army troops and Myanmar Police Force officers killed at least sixty-five individuals. The massacre became one of the deadliest domestic incidents to occur in the aftermath of the 2021 Myanmar coup d'état, and marked a serious escalation in the military's violence against civilians resisting the coup. The violent crackdown also precipitated a mass exodus of factory workers, residents, and businesses from Hlaingthaya, a major factory hub in the country.

== Background ==
On 1 February 2021, the Myanmar Armed Forces staged a coup d'état and deposed the democratically elected government led by the National League for Democracy. Shortly thereafter, the military established a junta, the State Administration Council, and declared a national state of emergency. In response, civilians throughout the country staged large-scale protests to resist the military takeover.

Large-scale protests began in Hlaingthaya in early March. Protests in Hlaingthaya Township, a working-class suburb located in the outskirts of Yangon, were particularly large and well-organised because of trade union members and factory workers who lived and worked in the area, which is the site of over 850 garment factories. The township is also home to many internally displaced migrants from Ayeyarwady Region who were displaced after the 2008 Cyclone Nargis.

== Incident ==
On the dawn of 14 March 2021, Hlaingthaya protesters had set up cement block, bamboo, and sandbag barriers at major bus stops on Hlaing River Road (locally known as 'Nyaungdon Road'), a major east-to-west thoroughfare, in preparation for sit-in strikes. Around 7 am, 50 women arrived at the protest site, chanting Buddhist parittas to ensure the protesters' safety. Around 9:30 am, thousands of protesters had gathered at the site.

Around 10 am, military trucks began crossing Bayinnaung Bridge to enter the township, with approximately 200 soldiers ultimately breaching the barriers and forcing protesters to disperse. By 11 am, soldiers and police officers began kettling protesters by advancing from both directions, deliberately firing at protesters with live ammunition. Security forces and snipers also gathered atop Aung Zeya Bridge, which overlooks the thoroughfare and connects the township to the rest of Yangon, to shoot protesters and other civilians, including volunteer medics and ambulance workers.

In the immediate aftermath of the massacre, the Assistance Association for Political Prisoners reported at least 22 deaths and 20 injuries. By the following afternoon, the death toll had risen to 58. A December 2021 Human Rights Watch report tallied at least 65 casualties, with victims ranging from the ages of 17 to 78. Many victims were buried at nearby Hteinbin Cemetery. No security force casualties were reported.

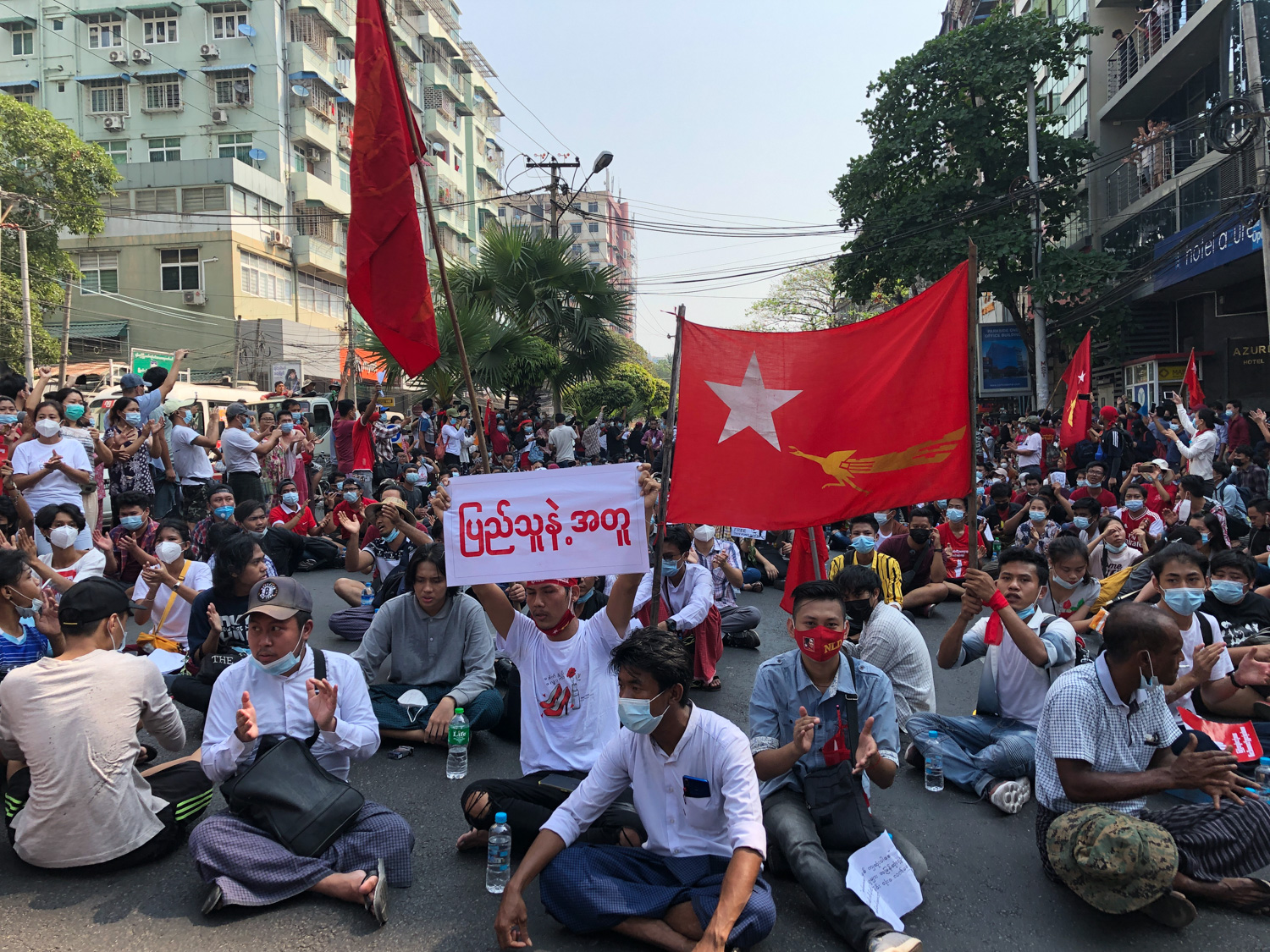
A sit-in strike in Yangon on 7 February.

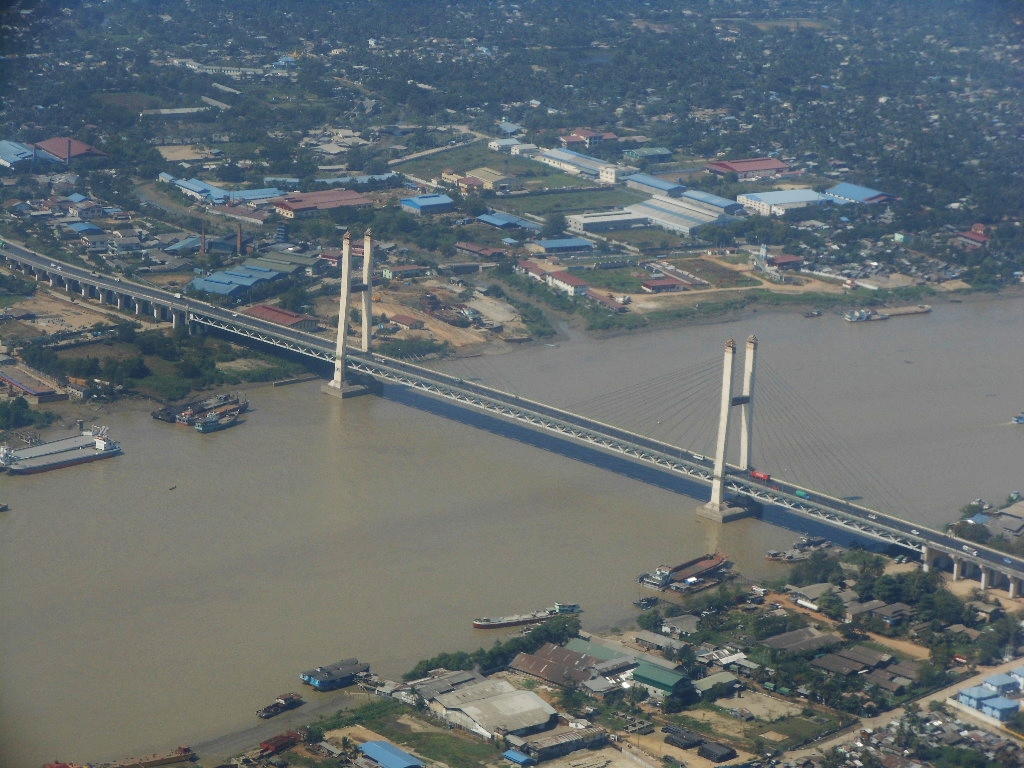
An aerial view of Aung Zeya Bridge.

== Perpetrators ==
The massacre was jointly executed by security forces from the Myanmar Army, under the command of Nyunt Win Swe, and the Myanmar Police Force, under the command of Myo Min Htike, the police chief of Yangon Region. Riot police (called lon htein) collaborated with soldiers from the 77th Light Infantry Division (LID) during protest crackdown.

== Aftermath ==
As the events unfolded, at least 32 Chinese-owned factories in the township were deliberately set on fire by unknown assailants, with losses totaling $37 million USD. Following the massacre, security forces established a heavy presence in the township's main areas. On the following Tuesday, 17 March, security forces killed at least 6 workers and arrested another 70 workers after a wage dispute at a Chinese-owned shoe factory in Hlaingthaya. In the immediate aftermath of the massacre, thousands of migrant workers fled the township, returning to their hometowns. By September 2021, at least 73 factories in Hlaingthaya's three industrial zones – Hlaingthaya, Shwe Linban, and Shwe Thanlwin - had shuttered, rendering at least 20,000 workers unemployed.

== Reactions ==
=== Domestic ===
On the evening of 14 March, the military regime imposed martial law in Hlaingthaya and nearby Shwepyitha townships, vesting judicial and executive authority with Nyunt Win Swe, the army commander of Yangon Region. Protesters were labelled by Burmese state media as "rioters". The following day, martial law was expanded to North Dagon, North Okkalapa, South Dagon, and Dagon Seikkan townships.

=== International ===
In the aftermath of the massacre, several United Nations bodies, including the Office of the United Nations High Commissioner for Human Rights and International Organization for Migration, denounced the violent crackdown in Hlaingthaya. Christine Schraner Burgener, the UN Secretary-General’s special envoy on Myanmar, and Dan Chugg, the British ambassador to Myanmar, called for the immediate cessation of violence.

By contrast, Chinese state media focused attention on the financial damage caused by the crackdown. The Chinese embassy in Myanmar called for Burmese security forces to ensure the safety of Chinese companies and personnel, to protect major Chinese investments in the area.

Antony Blinken, the US secretary of state, condemned the military's lethal crackdown in Hlaingthaya, and called for the international community to take concrete actions in response. On 22 March, the United States government imposed sanctions on the Myanmar Army's 77th Light Infantry Division, on Than Hlaing, the national chief of the Myanmar Police Force, and on Aung Soe, commander of the Myanmar Army's Bureau of Special Operations. The same day, the European Union imposed sanctions and travel bans on 11 individuals, constituting the first round of EU sanctions in the aftermath of the February coup.

== Legacy ==
In the aftermath of the massacre, Burmese poet Thitsar Ni published the poem "Hlaingthaya," which recounted his own observations of the massacre. In January 2022, an English translation of the poem was published in a poetry anthology.

== See also ==
- 2021 Myanmar coup d'état
- 2021–2023 Myanmar protests
- List of massacres in Myanmar
