= Soe Moe Hlaing =

Burmese activist and political prisoner (1968–2021)

Soe Moe Hlaing (Burmese: စိုးမိုးလှိုင်; 1968 — 24 May 2021), also known as Mae Gyi (Burmese: မဲကြီး), was a Burmese pro-democracy activist and political prisoner.

== Personal life and family ==
Born in 1968, Soe Moe Hlaing was one of eleven siblings. The most notable of these siblings is Lt. General Than Hlaing, who was Deputy Minister of Home Affairs and Chief of the Myanmar Police Force (MPF) until 2 May 2022, appointed by the State Administration Council after the 2021 Myanmar coup d'état. Soe Moe Hlaing was a chemistry honours student at Yangon University. In 2006, he married Myat Muyar Win, with whom he had five children. He died in military custody on 24 May 2021.

== Political career ==
Soe Moe Hlaing was active in the 1988 pro-democracy uprising, before joining the All Burma Students' Democratic Front (ABSDF), an armed, pro-democracy group as a battalion commander. He was allegedly threatened with decapitation by his brother Than Hlaing, as he had taken up arms against the Myanmar military.

After returning home in 1991, he was arrested and sentenced to 13 years in prison for his involvement in the ABSDF. When released in 2001, he volunteered to do charity work. During this time he founded a community based tourism network for local development, and also established the Winkabaw Ex-Political Prisoner Education Network, which offered free education to family members of political prisoners.

On 22 May 2021, in the aftermath of the 2021 Myanmar coup d'état, an informant allegedly told troops about their whereabouts and he was arrested along with eight others. On 24 May 2021, his family was notified that he had died.
