= Ni Lin Aung =

Burmese Army officer

- နီလင်းအောင်

Deputy Minister for Home Affairs
- Incumbent
- Assumed office 21 July 2023
- Minister: Yar Pyae
- Preceded by: Zin Min Htet

Chief of Myanmar Police Force
- Incumbent
- Assumed office 21 July 2023
- Preceded by: Zin Min Htet

Commander of the Triangle Region Command
- In office 2022–2023
- Leader: Min Aung Hlaing
- Preceded by: Myo Min Tun
- Succeeded by: Aung Khine Win

Commander of the Eastern Central Command
- Leader: Min Aung Hlaing

Commander of the Eastern Command

Personal details
- Born: Burma (now Myanmar)
- Spouse: Le Le Mar
- Children: 2

Military service
- Allegiance: Myanmar Army
- Branch/service: Myanmar Army
- Rank: Major general
- Commands: Eastern Command; Eastern Central Command

Ni Lin Aung (Burmese: နီလင်းအောင်) is a Myanmar Army officer and currently the Deputy Minister for Home Affairs and Chief of the Myanmar Police Force. He was a commander of the Eastern Central Command, which comprises central Shan State. Before being appointed in August 2022, he served as the commander of the Eastern Command. In February 2022, in the aftermath of the 2021 Myanmar coup d'etat, he was sanctioned by the European Union for violating human rights and committing military atrocities and abuses against civilians, particularly for his culpability in the Mo So massacre in December 2021. As of January 2022, he held the rank of Major General.

On 21 July 2023, as part of a cabinet reshuffle, Ni Lin Aung was appointed by the junta as deputy minister for home affairs.

== Personal life ==
He is married to Le Le Mar and has two children.

== See also ==
- 2021–2023 Myanmar civil war
- State Administration Council
- Tatmadaw
