= Zaw Bhone Hein =

Burmese YouTuber

- ဇော်ဘုန်းဟိန်း
- Born: Myanmar (Burma)
- Citizenship: Myanmar
- Known for: Military analysis on YouTube

Zaw Bhone Hein (Burmese: ဇော်ဘုန်းဟိန်း; pronounced [zɔ̀ bʰóʊɰ̃ héɪɰ̃]; also spelled Zaw Phone Hein) is a Burmese YouTuber who comments on military affairs. Based in Pyin Oo Lwin, he was a supporter of the Myanmar military junta. He was arrested in June 2025 by the Myanmar military intelligence forces over allegations of defaming senior military leaders that violate the Telecommunications Law.
