= Than Hlaing =

Burmese chief of police (born 1965)

- သန်းလှိုင်

Deputy Minister of Home Affairs
- In office 2 February 2021 – 2 May 2022
- President: Myint Swe (acting)
- Preceded by: Soe Tint Naing
- Succeeded by: Zin Min Htet

Chief of Myanmar Police Force
- In office 2 February 2021 – 2 May 2022
- Minister of Home Affairs: Soe Htut
- Preceded by: Aung Win Oo
- Succeeded by: Zin Min Htet

Personal details
- Born: 1965 (age 60–61) Union of Burma

Military service
- Allegiance: Myanmar
- Rank: Lieutenant General

Lieutenant-General Than Hlaing (Burmese: သန်းလှိုင်; born in 1965) is a Burmese politician and army officer who served as the Deputy Minister of Home Affairs and Chief of the Myanmar Police Force (MPF), appointed by the State Administration Council on 2 February 2021, in the aftermath of the 2021 Myanmar coup d'état. He previously served as the head of Eastern Central Command and North Western Command.

The MPF falls within the jurisdiction of the Minister of Home Affairs, currently headed by Myanmar Army Lieutenant General Soe Htut. The chief of Police usually holds the rank of Police Major General. However, Than Hlaing holds the rank of Lieutenant-General. He was replaced by Major General Zin Min Htet in May 2022.

== Sanctions ==
Since 18 February 2021, HM Treasury and the Foreign, Commonwealth and Development Office of United Kingdom have imposed sanctions on "Than Hlaing" for responsibility for serious human rights violations by the Myanmar Police Force. The UK sanctions include a freezing of his assets under the UK and a ban on entry or transit to the UK.

Since 22 March 2021, The U.S. Department of the Treasury has imposed sanctions on "Than Hlaing", in response to the Burmese military's continued campaign of violence and intimidation against peaceful protesters and civil society, pursuant to Executive Order 14014. Under Than Hlaing's leadership, the Burma Police Force has gone from attacking peaceful protesters with water cannons, rubber bullets, and tear gas, to using live ammunition. The US sanctions include a freezing of his assets under the US and a ban on transactions with a US person.

Since 22 March 2021, the Council of the European Union has imposed sanctions on "Than Hlaing" for responsibility for the military coup and the subsequent military and police repression against peaceful demonstrators, pursuant to Council Regulation (EU) 2021/479 and Council Implementing Regulation (EU) 2021/480 which amended Council Regulation (EU) No 401/2013. The EU sanctions include a freezing of assets under member countries of the EU and a ban on entry or transit to the countries.

== Personal life ==
He was one of 11 siblings in the family. His younger brother Soe Moe Hlaing, was a pro-democracy activist and murdered in regime custody.

== See also ==
- Cabinet of Myanmar
- Myanmar Police Force
