= People's Embrace =

- ပြည်သူ့ရင်ခွင်
- Formation: May 2021; 5 years ago
- Purpose: To facilitate defections from the Myanmar Armed Forces and Myanmar Police Force
- Region served: Myanmar
- Official language: Burmese
- Parent organization: National Unity Government
- Website: People's Embrace on Facebook

People's Embrace (Burmese: ပြည်သူ့ရင်ခွင်) is a network of individuals supporting the defection of personnel from the Myanmar Armed Forces and Myanmar Police Force. The network was established in May 2021 by military personnel in the aftermath of the 2021 Myanmar coup d'état to assist defectors and their families, including social services like accommodation, safe passage, and security. These services have often been coupled with financial incentives and monetary stipends to help supplant defectors' lost wages, although funding remains scarce. People's Embrace has been absorbed into the opposition National Unity Government's Ministry of Defense. Under military law, defectors who desert their posts can face the death penalty, and the families of defectors face retaliation. The network is supported by hundreds of volunteers. People's Embrace is part of a broader civil disobedience movement (CDM) among Burmese who oppose the 2021 military coup.

As of January 2023, 3,000 soldiers and 7,000 police officers have defected since the coup. The majority of defections occurred between June and December 2021. However, over the last 60 years, the Burmese military has remained largely cohesive, supported by a system of rewards and punishments and a rigorous indoctrination process.

An independent program called People's Soldiers also operates a digital outreach campaign and a network of volunteers offering safe passage, shelter and food.

== See also ==
- 2021–2022 Myanmar protests
