= Special Branch and Criminal Investigation Department =

Government department of Myanmar

The Special Intelligence Department (SID) serves as the primary Myanmar Police Intelligence and law enforcement apparatus constitutionally integrated as a constituent agency within the Myanmar Police Force of the Republic of the Union of Myanmar. Operating under the direct command of a Police Brigadier General, the department exercises legally defined jurisdiction over the issuance of travel documents, the concurrent execution of conventional and unconventional criminal investigations and strategic counterintelligence and state security operations conducted under statutory police powers, and the preservation of internal security.

In the interest of national security and regime stability, the agency deploys advanced signals and cyber intelligence (SIGINT/CYBINT) capabilities, leveraging sophisticated surveillance infrastructure for domestic police oversight, civilian monitoring, and the systematic neutralization of political dissidents.

Furthermore, the SID executes high-threat, intelligence-led executive protection operations to ensure the continuity of governance and mitigate targeted asymmetric threats. This protective mandate extends directly to members of the National Defence and Security Council (NDSC), junta ministers, and senior military-civilian officials, as well as foreign diplomats and state guests.

Concurrently, the department maintains specialized protective custody over detained former political leaders. To safeguard the regime's legal and economic infrastructure, the SID provides strategic security details for military and special court judges, prosecutors, prominent bankers, and state-owned enterprise executives who serve as high-value targets for financial interdiction. Additionally, it administers stringent threat-mitigation and protective measures for critical state informants and key witnesses in high-stakes national security litigations.

== See also ==
- Bureau of Special Investigation
- Office of the Chief of Military Security Affairs
