= Thitsar Ni =

Burmese poet

- သစ္စာနီ
- Born: 1946 (age 78–79); Rangoon, British Burma
- Occupations: Poet; writer

Thitsar Ni (Burmese: သစ္စာနီ; born 1946 in Rangoon) is a Burmese poet and writer, known for spearheading post-modern Burmese poetry since the 1970s. He has published more than 30 books under several pen names, spanning genres including poetry, short stories, literary criticism, science fiction, and religion, philosophy, and world politics. In 2011, he founded a social welfare organization, Kusala Parahita (ကုသလပရဟိတ), with singer Ratha. After witnessing the Hlaingthaya massacre in March 2021, he wrote a poem, "Hlaingthaya," which was published in a 2022 poetry anthology, Picking off new shoots will not stop the spring. Thitsar Ni is a Buddhist.

== Works ==
- The Time for Fetching Water (1965)
- Myinsaing Archery (1978)
- Walking Out of My Own Skin
- Redundant Sentences
- 21st Album
- Hlaingthaya
