= Zin Min Htet =

Burmese military officer

- ဇင်မင်းထက်

Deputy Minister of Sports and Youth Affairs
- Incumbent
- Assumed office 21 July 2023
- Leader: Min Aung Hlaing
- Preceded by: Soe Win

Deputy Minister of Home Affairs
- In office 2 May 2022 – 21 July 2023
- Preceded by: Than Hlaing
- Succeeded by: Ni Lin Aung

Chief of Myanmar Police Force
- In office 2 May 2022 – 21 July 2023
- Preceded by: Than Hlaing
- Succeeded by: Ni Lin Aung

Personal details
- Born: Burma (now Myanmar)
- Spouse: Thazin Khin
- Education: Defence Services Academy

Military service
- Allegiance: Myanmar
- Branch/service: Myanmar Army
- Rank: Major General

Zin Min Htet (Burmese: ဇင်မင်းထက်) is a Burmese military officer who is presently a Major General in the Myanmar Army. In May 2022, he was appointed as the chief of the Myanmar Police Force and deputy minister for Home Affairs, replacing Than Hlaing in both roles. He was appointed as deputy minister for Ministry of Sports and Youth Affairs on 21 July 2023.

== Military career ==
Zin Min Htet graduated from the 32nd intake of the Defence Services Academy. He served as the military's Joint Adjutant General from 2019 to May 2022.

In December 2022, he was sanctioned by Canada in response to the 2021 Myanmar coup d'état. On 20 February 2023, the European Union imposed sanctions on Zin Min Htet for human rights violations and undermining democracy and rule of law in the country.

== Personal life ==
Zin Min Htet is married to Thazin Khin, a urologist in Naypyidaw.

== See also ==
- 2021–2023 Myanmar civil war
- State Administration Council
- Tatmadaw
