= Aung Soe (general) =

Burmese army officer

- အောင်စိုး

Commander of Bureau of Special Operations No. 4
- Leader: Min Aung Hlaing

Deputy Minister for Home Affairs

Personal details
- Born: 3 December 1963 (age 62) Bassein, Burma (now Pathein, Myanmar)
- Party: Union Solidarity and Development Party
- Education: Defence Services Academy

Military service
- Allegiance: Myanmar
- Branch/service: Myanmar Army
- Years of service: –2022
- Rank: Lieutenant General

Lieutenant General Aung Soe (Burmese: အောင်စိုး, born 3 December 1963 in Bassein, Burma) is a former Burmese military officer and general secretary of the Union Solidarity and Development Party, the Burmese military's proxy political party.

== Military career ==
Htun Aung graduated from the 26th batch of the Defence Services Academy. He previously served as commander of Bureau of Special Operations (BSO) No. 4 and commanded operations in Kayin State after the 2021 Myanmar coup d'état. During the Thein Sein and Aung San Suu Kyi administrations, he served as deputy minister for home affairs. In October 2022, he retired from the Burmese armed forces to become general secretary for the Union Solidarity and Development Party. He has been sanctioned by the governments of the European Union, Canada and the United States for human rights violations.

== See also ==
- 2021 Myanmar coup d'état
- State Administration Council
- Tatmadaw
