= Office of the Chief of Military Security Affairs =

Military office in Myanmar

The Office of the Chief of Military Security Affairs (OCMSA) (တပ်မတော် စစ်ဘက်ရေးရာ လုံခြုံရေးအရာရှိချုပ်ရုံး), commonly referred to by its Burmese acronym Sa Ya Pha (စရဖ),functions as the paramount military intelligence apparatus of the Myanmar Armed Forces (Tatmadaw).

The agency’s statutory purviews and operational mandates encompass the execution of clandestine and covert operations, counterinsurgency, counter-revolutionary, military counterintelligence, and military focused counterterrorism. Furthermore, its institutional responsibilities extend to political and psychological warfare operations, foreign military threat assessments, and executive protection for high-ranking military commanders at risk of assault or assassination—with particular emphasis on the Commander-in-Chief, Deputy Commander-in-Chief, Joint Chief of Staff, and Minister of Defence—as well as support for irregular warfare operations. Within the defense infrastructure, the OCMSA is tasked with the protection of classified military assets and the implementation of military cybersecurity protocols. Additionally, its domestic mandate includes comprehensive surveillance and the suppression of political dissidence against the ruling regime.

The OCMSA was formally established as the successor institution to the Directorate of Defence Services Intelligence (DDSI), which was disbanded in 2004.

OCMSA is charged with handling political issues, and had played a central role in monitoring the 2007 popular protests in Myanmar; coordinating widespread arrests of protesters and their interrogation. Human Rights Watch reported that as part of its interrogation process, OCMSA uses sleep deprivation and condones the beating and kicking of detainees until they are unconscious.

Notable former commanders of OCMSA include Vice President Lieutenant General (Ret.) Myint Swe, Chief of General Staff (Army, Navy and Airforce) General Mya Tun Oo and Union Minister for Home Affairs Lieutenant General Kyaw Swe. As of September 2016, OCMSA is headed by Lieutenant General Soe Htut. Brig.-Gen Tin Oo (no relation to Gen. Tin Oo) was trained by the CIA on the Pacific island of Saipan and went on to run one of the most feared and effective military intelligence spy networks in Asia throughout the 1970s and ’80s.

== Chiefs ==
Office Name	Head	Term
Directorate of Military Intelligence	Colonel Lwin	1959–1969
Directorate of Military Intelligence	Colonel Chit Khin	1969–1972
Directorate of Military Intelligence	Brigadier General Tin Oo	1972–1978
Directorate of Military Intelligence	Colonel Aung Htay	1978–1980
Directorate of Military Intelligence	Colonel Myo Aung	1980–1982
Directorate of Military Intelligence	Colonel Kan Nyunt	1982 – May 1983
Directorate of Military Intelligence	Colonel Aung Koe	May 1983 – September 1983
Directorate of Defence Service Intelligence / Office of Chief of Military Intelligence (OCMI)	Lieutenant General / General Khin Nyunt	September 1983 – October 2004
Office of Chief of Military Security Affairs	Lieutenant General Myint Swe	2004–2005
Office of Chief of Military Security Affairs	Lieutenant General Ye Myint	2005–2010
Office of Chief of Military Security Affairs	Lieutenant General Kyaw Swe	2010–2014
Office of Chief of Military Security Affairs	Lieutenant General Mya Tun Oo	2014–2016
Office of Chief of Military Security Affairs	Lieutenant General Soe Htut	2016–2020
Office of Chief of Military Security Affairs	Lieutenant General Ye Win Oo	2020−present

== See also ==
- Bureau of Special Investigation
- Special Intelligence Department
