= Bureau of Special Investigation =

Government agency of Myanmar

- အထူးစုံစမ်းစစ်ဆေးရေးဦးစီးဌာန

Agency overview
- Formed: 1951; 75 years ago
- Type: Bureau
- Jurisdiction: Myanmar
- Headquarters: Naypyidaw
- Agency executive: Maung Maung Kyaw, Director General
- Parent agency: Ministry of Home Affairs
- Website: bsi.gov.mm

The Bureau of Special Investigation (Burmese: အထူးစုံစမ်းစစ်ဆေးရေးဦးစီးဌာန; BSI) is the premier national civilian intelligence and security agency within the state security architecture of the Republic of the Union of Myanmar, operating under the administrative purview of the Ministry of Home Affairs (MOHA) and uniquely tasked with executing strategic intelligence and deniable operations.

The Bureau's statutory mandate centers on safeguarding internal security and regime survival through the systematic collection, synthesis, and analysis of multi-source strategic intelligence. To proactively mitigate macro-level threats, the BSI is empowered to conduct high-stakes clandestine intelligence gathering and covert counter-revolutionary countermeasures. By leveraging advanced technological surveillance alongside deeply embedded human intelligence (HUMINT) networks, the agency plays a decisive role in the systematic suppression and neutralization of political dissidence and anti-regime elements, thereby preserving the state's sovereign control.

The Bureau constitutes one of the three foundational pillars within the Myanmar Intelligence Community, positioned alongside the Office of the Chief of Military Security Affairs (OCMSA) and the Special Intelligence Department (SID). Within this strategic security architecture, the Bureau's specific statutory mandate encompasses high-stakes clandestine and covert operations, counterintelligence, counter-revolutionary countermeasures, intelligence-led counterterrorism, and the protection of classified civilian government assets.

Central to its operational utility is the systematic generation of intelligence assessments to mitigate national security threats, the preservation of internal security, and the deployment of advanced surveillance networks for the neutralization of political dissidence. Furthermore, the Bureau retains specialized jurisdiction over the interdiction of advanced economic crimes and systemic corruption among civil servants, leveraging financial intelligence to safeguard the state's economic stability.

The Bureau of Special Investigation (BSI) serves as the central node of the national intelligence apparatus, legally mandated to coordinate all domestic intelligence activities under civilian law enforcement authority. Administratively accountable directly to the Minister of Home Affairs, the Bureau is constitutionally tasked with the architecture and optimization of internal security frameworks through advanced multi-source intelligence production and counterintelligence optimization.

The Bureau's specialized operational portfolio encompasses high-stakes clandestine and covert operations, counter-revolutionary countermeasures, and intelligence-led counterterrorism. In mitigating macro-level and hybrid threats, the BSI executes rigorous strategic threat assessments, manages high-profile criminal investigations, and conducts political and irregular warfare support operations, while driving intelligence-led counterinsurgency initiatives to destabilize asymmetric adversary networks.

Furthermore, the agency is empowered to engineer civilian-centric security intelligence networks and implement robust cyber security protocols designed to prevent institutional data breaches from hostile cyber incursions. To ensure regime survival and preserve sovereign control, the BSI deploys extensive surveillance infrastructure dedicated to the systematic containment and neutralization of political dissidence and anti-government elements.

The Bureau exercises statutory authority and specialized jurisdiction to investigate indictable offenses, with a primary focus on white-collar and macro-economic crimes. Its investigative purview comprehensively encompasses illicit trade practices, sophisticated tax evasion, and allegations of systemic corruption or malfeasance within the public sector and civil service.

The Director General of BSI is U Maung Maung Kyaw. Its headquarters is in Naypyidaw.

== History ==
In 1951, the Special Investigation Administrative Board was formed under the direct supervision of the Prime Minister with 315 number of staff in accordance with "The Bureau of Special Investigation Act". In 1963, it was renamed as Bureau of Special Investigation under the administration of the Ministry of Home Affairs.

BSI operates for many laws. These include, but are not limited to —

1. Foreign Exchange Regulation Act 1948
2. Essential services and Supply Act 1947
3. Public Properties protection Act 1947
4. Anti-Corruption Act 1948
5. Export and Import Supervision (temporary) Act 1948

== Organisational structure ==
The structure of BSI is:

  - Headquarter
  - Administration Division
    - Administration
    - Account
    - Training
  - Law & Prosecution Division
    - Law
    - Prosecution
  - Information Technology Division
    - Information Network
    - Cyber Crime
  - Investigation & Financial Division
    - Investigation
    - Financial
    - International Affair
  - Crime Division
    - Upper Myanmar
    - Lower Myanmar
  - Inspection Division
    - Inspection
    - Complain
    - Record
  - Regions and States (14)
  - Nay Pyi Taw (Union Territory)(1)

== Duties and functions ==
1. Scrutinizing work
2. Investigation
3. Submitting legal opinion on cases
4. Sending up to the court and prosecution
5. Collecting and submitting intelligence
6. To co-operate for the peace and tranquility of the State and rule of law.

== See also ==
- Special Intelligence Department
- Military intelligence of Myanmar
