= Myanmar Police Force =

Law enforcement agency

Myanmar Police Force မြန်မာနိုင်ငံ ရဲတပ်ဖွဲ့
- Coat of arms

- Emblem

- Flag
- Motto: "ကူညီပါရစေ" (Let me help you.)

Agency overview
- Formed: 1964; 62 years ago
- Preceding agency: Indian Imperial Police
- Employees: 93,000 (2012)

Jurisdictional structure
- Operations jurisdiction: Myanmar
- Legal jurisdiction: Myanmar
- General nature: Gendarmerie; Civilian police

Operational structure
- Headquarters: Naypyidaw
- Elected officer responsible: Moe Aung, Minister of Home Affairs
- Agency executive: Lieutenant general Ni Lin Aung, Chief of Police
- Parent agency: Ministry of Home Affairs
- Child agencies: State and Division Police; Special Forces; Training Department; Reserve Units; Combat Police Battalions; Anti-Narcotics Task Force

Website
- Official website

The Myanmar Police Force (Burmese: မြန်မာနိုင်ငံ ရဲတပ်ဖွဲ့), formerly the People's Police Force (ပြည်သူ့ ရဲတပ်ဖွဲ့), is the law enforcement agency of Myanmar. It was established in 1964 as an independent department under the Ministry of Home Affairs.

== History ==
The Police Force in Myanmar has an extensive history; the police force also includes local police and regional police in different jurisdictions.

=== British rule in Myanmar ===
The primary police force in British Burma was the Burma Police. In addition, there was a paramilitary Burma Military Police, the Railway Police, and the Rangoon Town Police. From roughly 1891, most executive positions within the Burma Police were filled by members of the Indian Imperial Police cadre.

In 1872 the third mayor of Mergui District, Sir Ashly Din (1870–1875) assigned the first police officer to be stationed at Maliwan, a village 24 miles north of current Victoria Point.

Perhaps the most famous policeman in Burma from this period is the author George Orwell, who in 1922 joined the Indian Imperial Police in Burma. Another famous colonial policeman in Burma was Hector Hugh Munro, known as Saki.

=== Post-independence (1948–present) ===
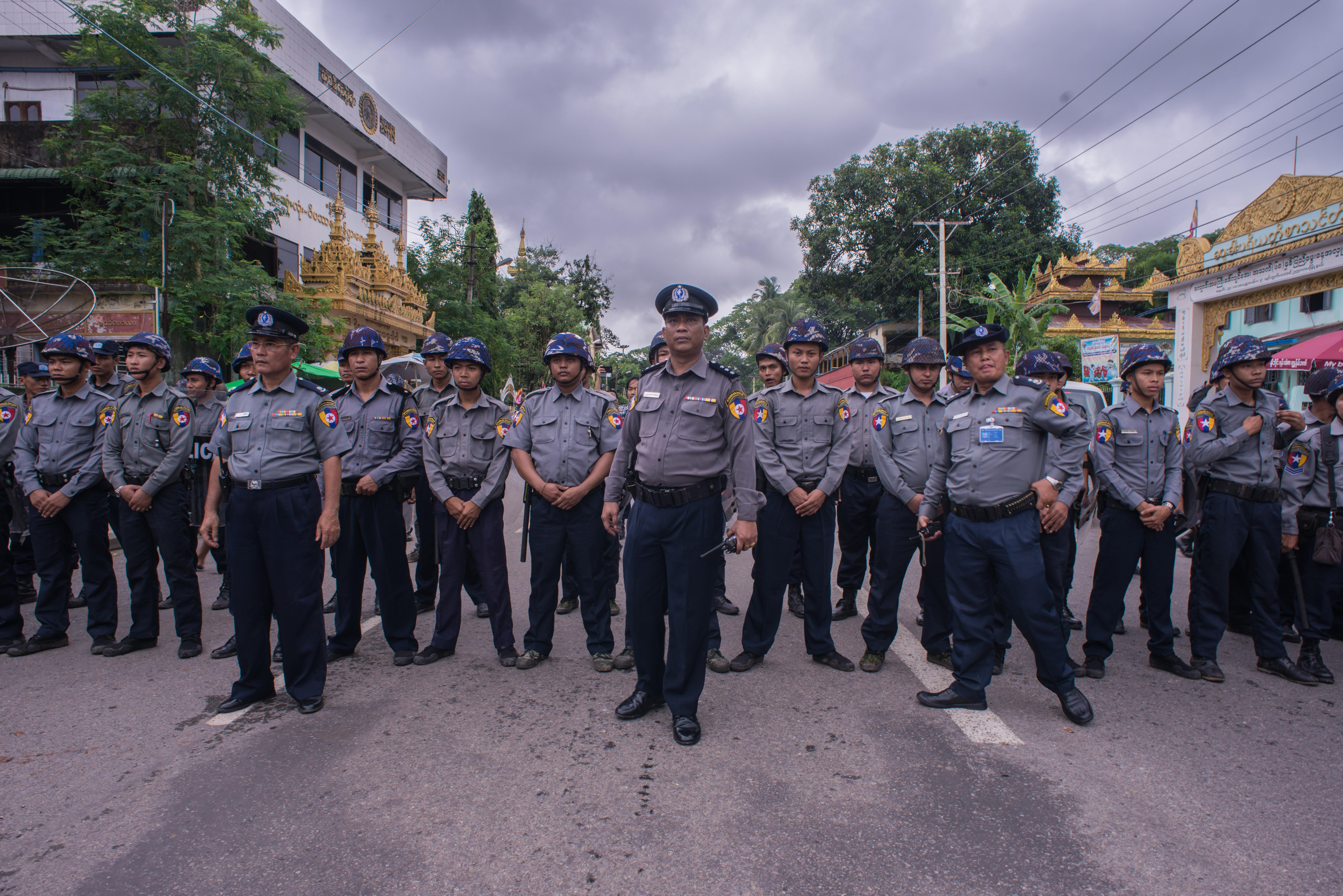
Myanmar police officers blocking protesters in Bahan Township, Yangon.

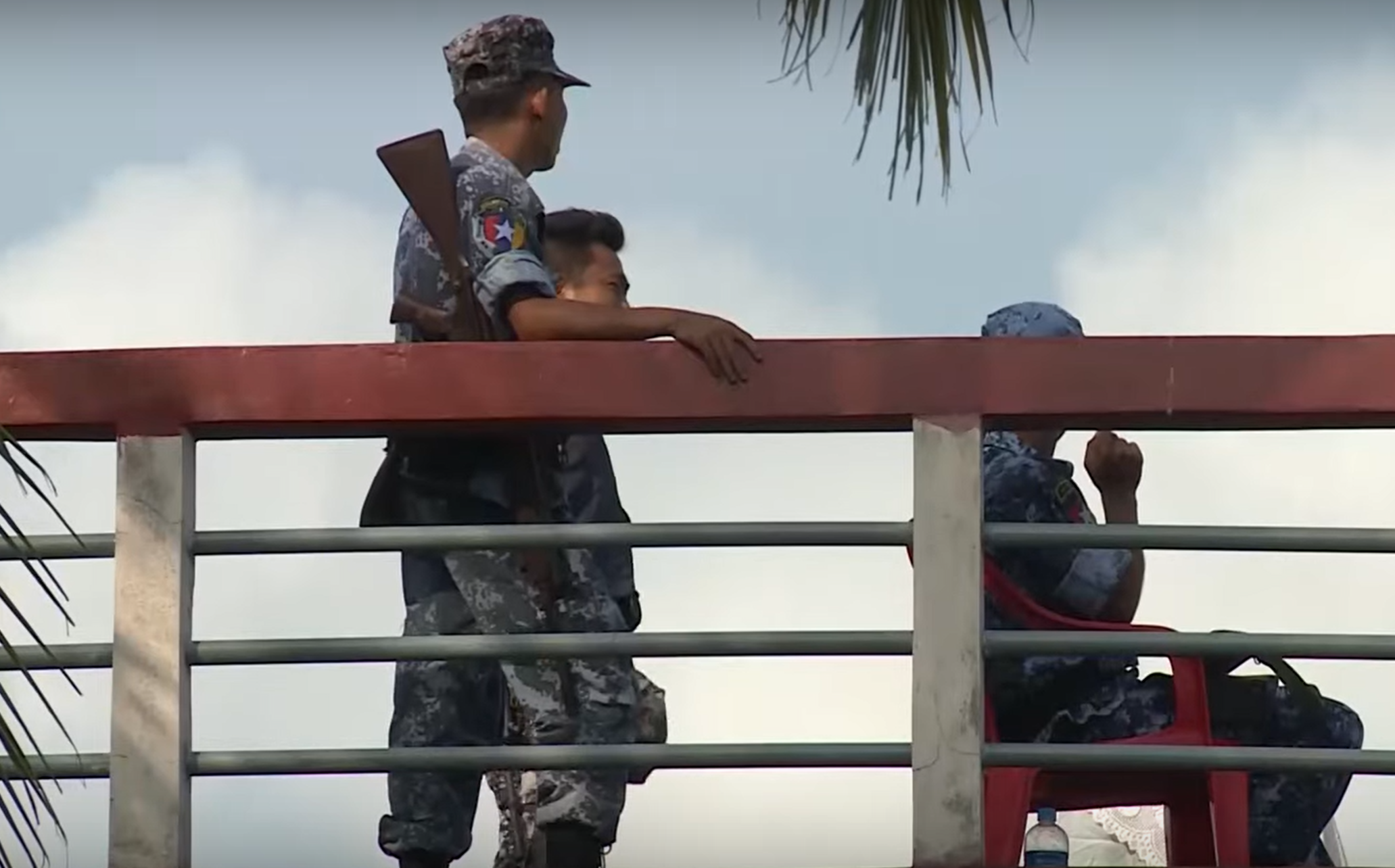
Police watching the Bangladesh border

On 16 March 1988 following the killing of two students during the pro-democracy demonstrations, students marching on Prome Road were confronted near Inya Lake by the security force riot police and many beaten to death or drowned.

The national police is made up of several smaller entities, including

- Myanmar Railways Police
- Intelligence division

== Organisation ==
The current Director General of Myanmar Police Force is Major General Zin Min Htet with its headquarters in Naypyidaw. Its command structure is based on established civil jurisdictions. Under the command of police headquarters, state and region police forces have been established in respective territories of states and divisions with headquarters in their capital cities.

=== State and division police forces ===
There are 14 state and divisional police forces and three additional state/division police forces commanded by police brigadiers or colonels. Their jurisdictions are divided according to the Civil Administration. The states and divisions, additional states have the same status.

Each state and divisional police force consist of four components.

- Office of the Commander of the State and Divisional Police Force
- Office of the Commander of the District Police Force
- Office of the Commander of the Township Police Force
- Police Stations

In previous time, the district police forces are classified into two classes depending on the area, population and development, namely A and B Class. Commanders of the A Class District Police Forces are police lieutenant colonels, and B Classes are police majors, but there is no classification and all districts assigned with lieutenant colonel. Commanders of township police forces are police majors, and police station officers are police captains.

=== Special Departments ===
There are four Special Departments, in which the first ten departments are headed by the police brigadier generals and the remaining two are by police colonels.

- Security Police Force
- Border Guard Police (BGP)
- Special Intelligence Department (SID) (Special Branch)
- Criminal Investigation Department (CID)
- Railways Police Department
- Anti-Human Trafficking Police Force
- Maritime Police Force
- Aviation Police Force
- Drug Enforcement Division
- Financial Investigation Force
- Myanmar Traffic Police
- Tourist Security Police Force
- Oil Field Security Police Force
- Forestry Security Police Force
- Highway Police Force
- Municipal Police Department

=== Training Centres ===
There are three main Training Centers, one Central Training Institute of Myanmar Police Force and Three Police Training Depots. The State and Divisional Police Forces have their own training centres for refresher courses and Junior Leader (NCO) Courses.

Bachelor's degree holders from Distance Learning University were disqualified from sitting the SIP exam. Thus vast numbers of Bachelor holding police personal were concerned for their future.

Course Name	Duration
Deputy Superintendent Cadet Course	50 weeks
Sub-Inspector Cadet Course	6 weeks
Surveillance Officer Course	6 weeks
Investigation Officer Course	6 weeks
Police Station Officer Course	8 weeks
Staff Officer Course	6 weeks
Township Police Commander Course	8 weeks
District Police Commander Course	12 weeks

==== No. 1 Police Training Depot ====
The No.1 Police Training Depot is commanded by a Police Lieutenant Colonel and undertakes:

Course Name	Duration
Basic Training Course for Lance Corporal and Corporal	4 weeks
Warrant Officer and Police Sergeants Course	12 Weeks
Basic Training Course for Constables	24 weeks
Clerical Training	4 weeks
Instructor Renewal Course	4 weeks

==== No. 2 Police Training Depot ====
The No.2 Police Training Depot is also commanded by a Police Lieutenant Colonel, and undertakes only Basic Training Course for Constables, which normally takes around 6 months to complete.

Course Name	Duration
Basic Training Course for Constables	6 Months

==== Taung Lay Lone Police Training Depot ====
The Taung Lay Lone Police Training Depot is commanded by a Police Lieutenant Colonel and undertakes:

Course Name	Duration
Basic Training Course for lance corporal and Corporal	4 weeks
Warrant Officer and Police Sergeants Course	12 Weeks
Basic Training Course for Constables	6 Months

=== Combat Police Battalions ===
There are sixteen Police Battalions to carry out general security duties under the command of Battalion Control Command. The Battalion Commandants are Police Lieutenant Colonels. As the populace of the cities including Yangon and Mandalay have been increased day after day, problems on social, economy and politics are risen up that could lead to emergence of civil unrest and sabotage. It is necessary to prevent from destruction and harassment, VIP and project factories and workshops, security of diplomats and their embassies. Seven of these Police Battalions are situated in the Yangon Divisional areas and two in Mandalay and three in Arakan, one in Sagaing, one in Mon State, one in Pegu, one in Prome.

These specially-trained and combat capable battalions are formed with personnel from former Riot Security Police, better known as "Lon Htein" Units. Each battalion consists of 500+ personnel and these battalions are supported by two support battalions, which include signal and medical units. These battalions structure are similar to that of Army's Light Infantry Battalions and they are subordinate to their respective Regional Military Commands.

- 1st Combat Police Battalion (HQ at Hlawga)
- 2nd Combat Police Battalion (HQ at Maungtaw)
- 3rd Combat Police Battalion (HQ at Shwemyayar)
- 4th Combat Police Battalion (HQ at Shwesaryan)
- 5th Combat Police Battalion (HQ at Hmawbi)
- 6th Combat Police Battalion (HQ at Shwepyitha)
- 7th Combat Police Battalion (HQ at Kyauktan)
- 8th Combat Police Battalion (HQ at Mingaladon)
- 9th Combat Police Battalion (HQ at Hlaingthaya)
- 10th Combat Police Battalion (HQ at Pyay/Prome)
- 11th Combat Police Battalion
- 12th Combat Police Battalion
- 14th Combat Police Battalion (HQ at Pa Lake, Mandalay)
- 15th Combat Police Battalion
- 16th Combat Police Battalion

=== Anti-Narcotic Task Forces ===
26 special anti-narcotic task forces have been established under the direction of the Central Committee for Drug Abuse Control.

== Equipment ==
=== Small arms ===
Myanmar Police Force uses a wide range of weapons and ammunitions, ranging from Second World War vintage weapons to modern sophisticated ones.

Most of the weapons are either seized from ethnic militias and criminals or are locally-produced copies of the G3 and other weapons phased out by the army.

Name	Country of origin	Type	References
Enfield revolver	United Kingdom	Revolver	
Colt Detective Special	United States	Revolver	
Ka Pa Sa MA5 MKI	Myanmar	Semi-automatic pistol	
Ka Pa Sa MA5 MKII	Myanmar	Semi-automatic pistol	
Norinco NR-08	China	Submachine gun	
Ka Pa Sa BA-52	Myanmar	Submachine gun	
Ka Pa Sa BA-93	Myanmar	Submachine gun	
Ka Pa Sa BA-94	Myanmar	Submachine gun	
Ka Pa Sa MA13 MKI	Myanmar	Submachine gun	
Ka Pa Sa MA13 MKII	Myanmar	Submachine gun	
Sten Gun	United Kingdom	Submachine gun	
Greener GP	United Kingdom	Shotgun	
Ka Pa Sa BA63	Myanmar	Assault rifle	
Ka Pa Sa MA11	Myanmar	Assault rifle	
Ka Pa Sa MA3	Myanmar	Assault rifle	
Lee–Enfield	United Kingdom	Assault rifle	
M1 carbine	United States	Assault rifle	
M1 Garand	United States	Assault rifle	
M16 rifle	United States	Assault rifle	
M4 carbine	United States	Assault rifle	
Type 56	China	Assault rifle	
Type 56	China	Assault rifle	
Type 63	China	Assault rifle	
Norinco CQ	China	Assault rifle	
Norinco QBZ 97	China	Assault rifle	
AK-47	Soviet Union	Assault rifle	
Bren Gun	United Kingdom	Machine gun	
Ka Pa Sa BA64	Myanmar	Machine gun	
Ka Pa Sa MA12	Myanmar	Machine gun	
Type 81	China	Machine gun	
Type 56	China	Machine gun	
M40 rifle	United States	Sniper rifle	
Ka Pa Sa BA100	Myanmar	Sniper rifle	
Ka Pa Sa MAS MKII	Myanmar	Sniper rifle	

=== Non-lethal weapons ===
- Taser
- Pepper Spray cans
- Pepper-spray projectile gun
- Pepperball
- Rubber, beanbag, & plastic bullet
- Baton
- Riot shield
- M84 stun grenade
- Tear gas
- M6/M7 series chemical grenade
- Sting grenade

=== Automobiles ===
==== Cars and trucks ====
- Chevrolet Suburban (confiscated item)
- Range Rover donated by Foreign Organisations for Anti-drugs Enforcement
- Mercedes Benz C-Class sedan (confiscated item)
- Toyota Dyna paddy wagon (Private-owned vehicles are commonly called volunteer patrol cars)
- Toyota closed double cab (confiscated item, used by escort team, patrol)
- Mitsubishi double cab (confiscated item, used by Police Col, Yangon)
- Mitsubishi pickup (confiscated item, used by Township Police Station, Yangon)
- Mitsubishi pickup (confiscated item, used by Police Lt Col, Yangon)
- Toyota pickup (confiscated item, used by Township Police Station, Yangon)
- FAW pickup
- Honda Saloon, patrol car
- Jeep, used by police station
- Mazda B pick-up, used by police station
- Toyota Celica, used as a police lead vehicle and as a high-speed police car to arrest sport cars
- Nissan Fairlady Z, used as a police lead vehicle and as a high-speed police car to arrest sport cars

=== Armoured vehicles ===
Photo	Model	Type	Quantity	Origin	Notes
Armoured vehicle/Armoured personnel carrier
	ZFB-05	Armoured personnel carrier	10	China	Received by 2011, they were transferred to police from Myanmar Army.
	Sinotruk HOWO	Water cannon truck	unknown	China	One of the most widely used against protesters in February 2021 Myanmar.
	BAAC-87	Armoured personnel carrier	unknown	Myanmar	One of the most widely used against protesters in February 2021 Myanmar.

=== Coastal Patrol Craft ===
Class	Builder	Serial Number	Year Entered Service	Armament	Note
PGM class	Myanmar	331; 332; 333; 334	2012	machine guns	

=== River Patrol Boat ===
Class	Builder	Serial Number	Year Entered Service	Armament	Note
PCE class	Myanmar, China	171; 151; 152; 153; 154; 156; 001; 002; 003; 161; 162	2013	machine guns	

== Rank and insignia ==
=== Commissioned officers ===
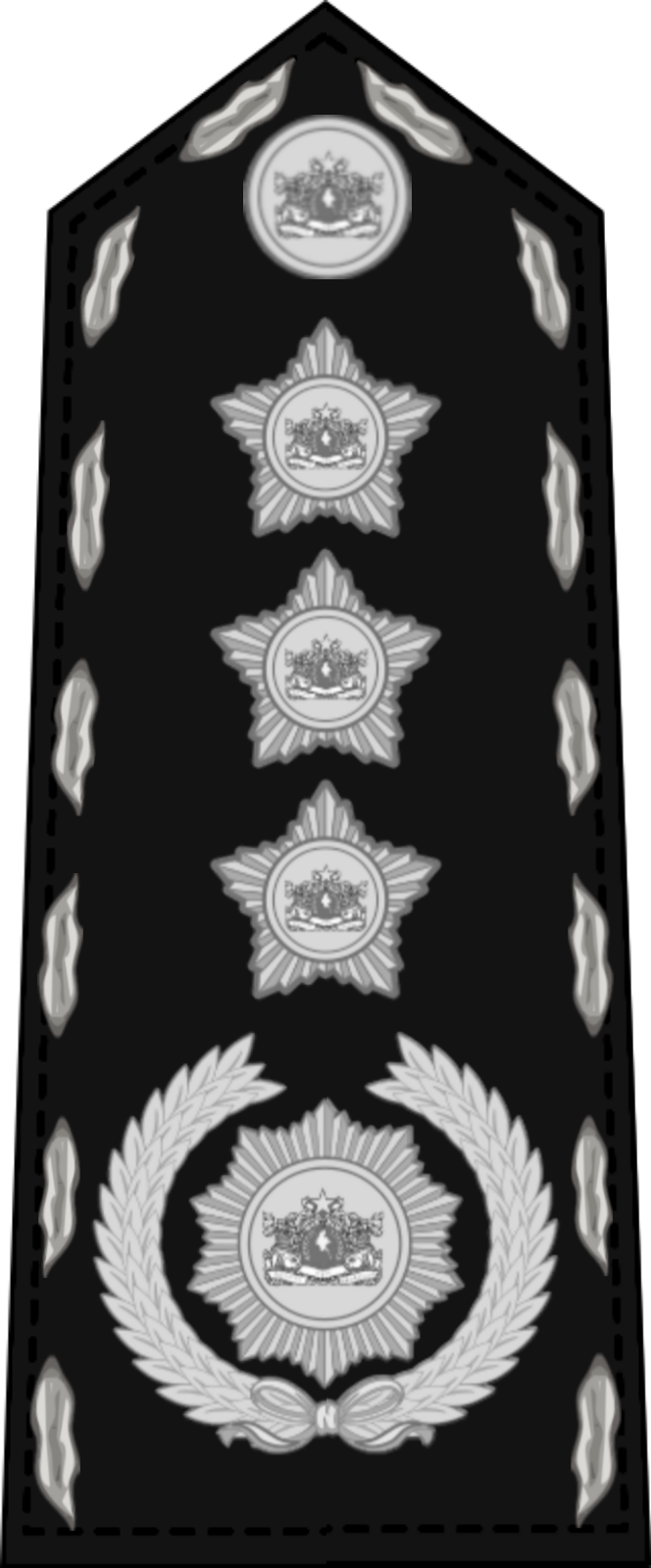
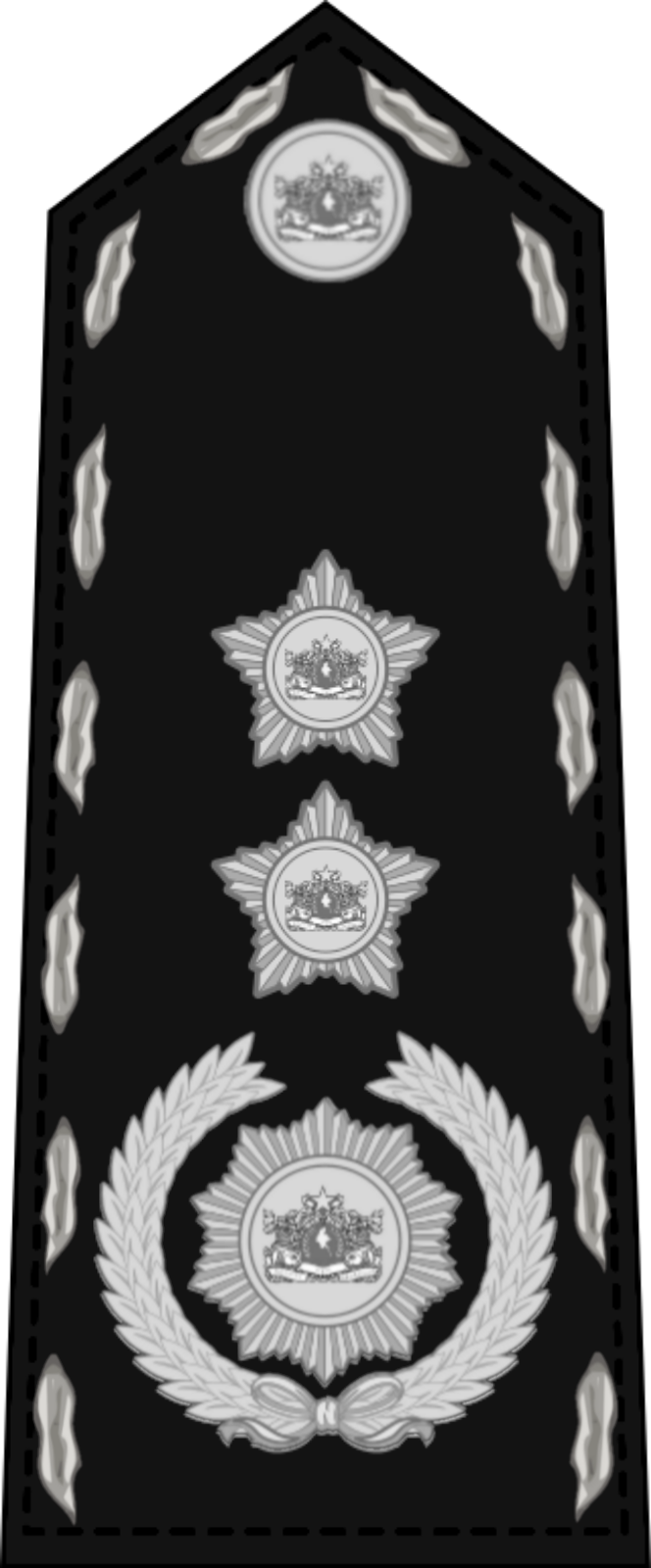
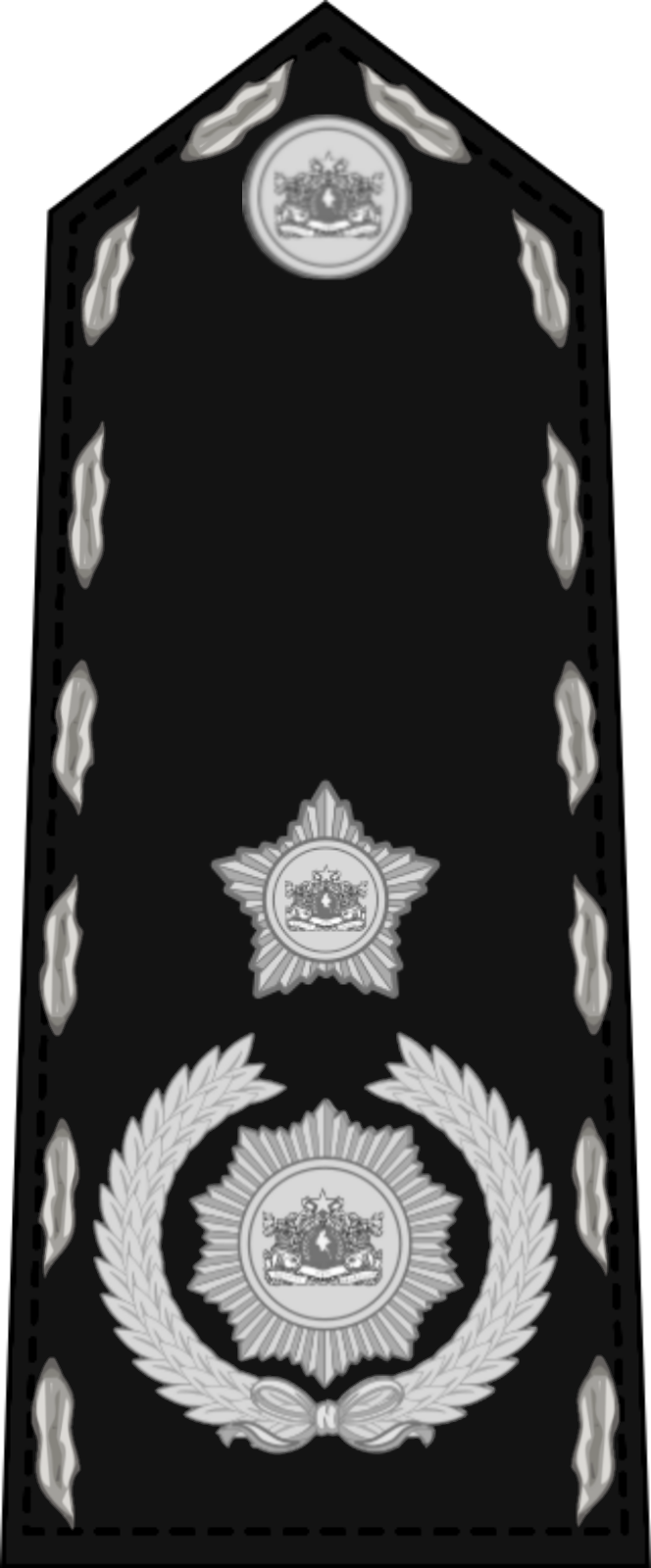
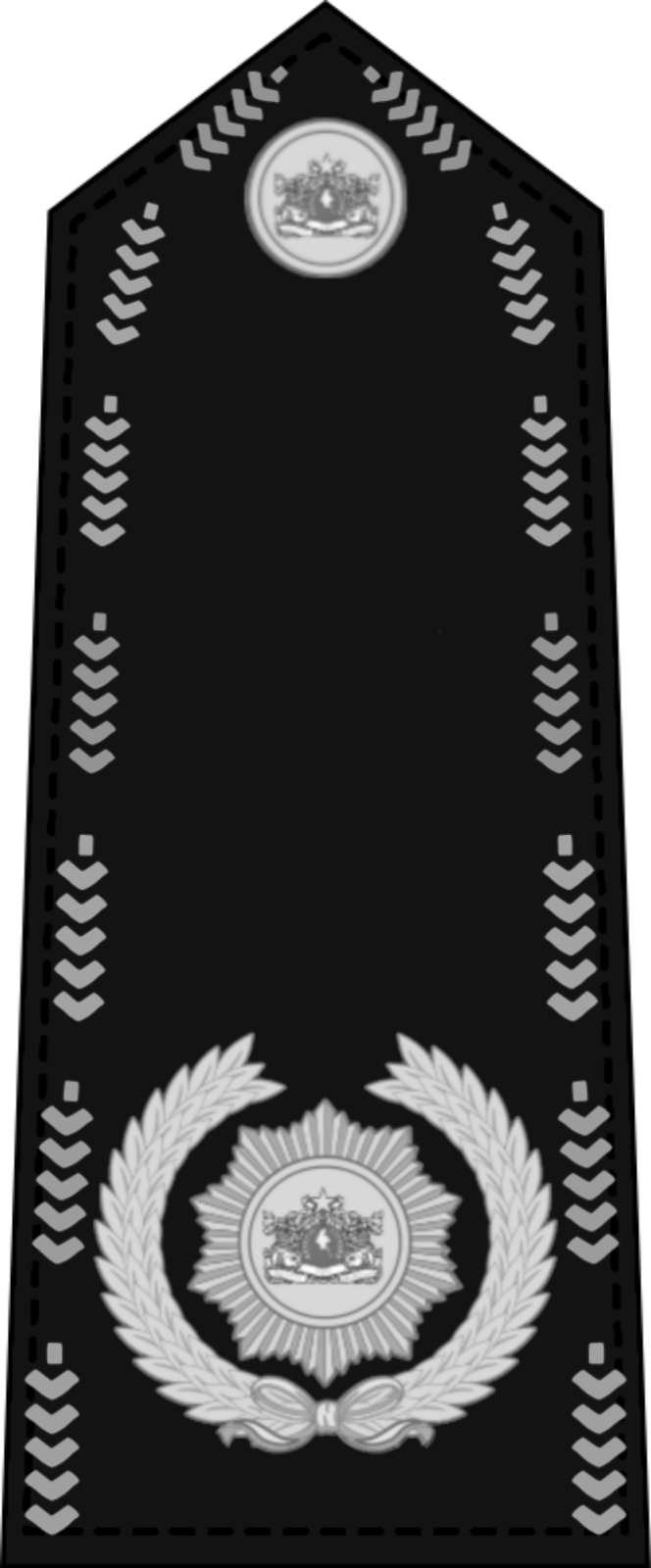
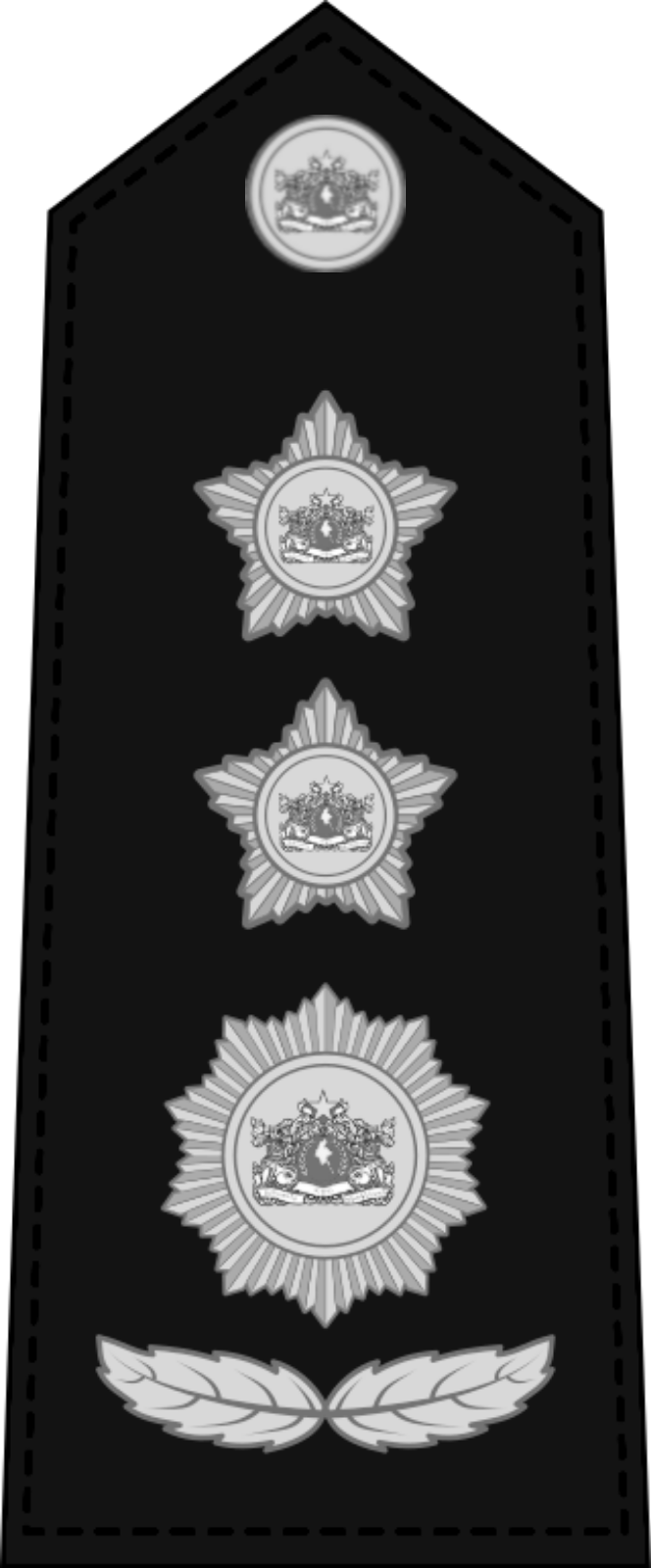
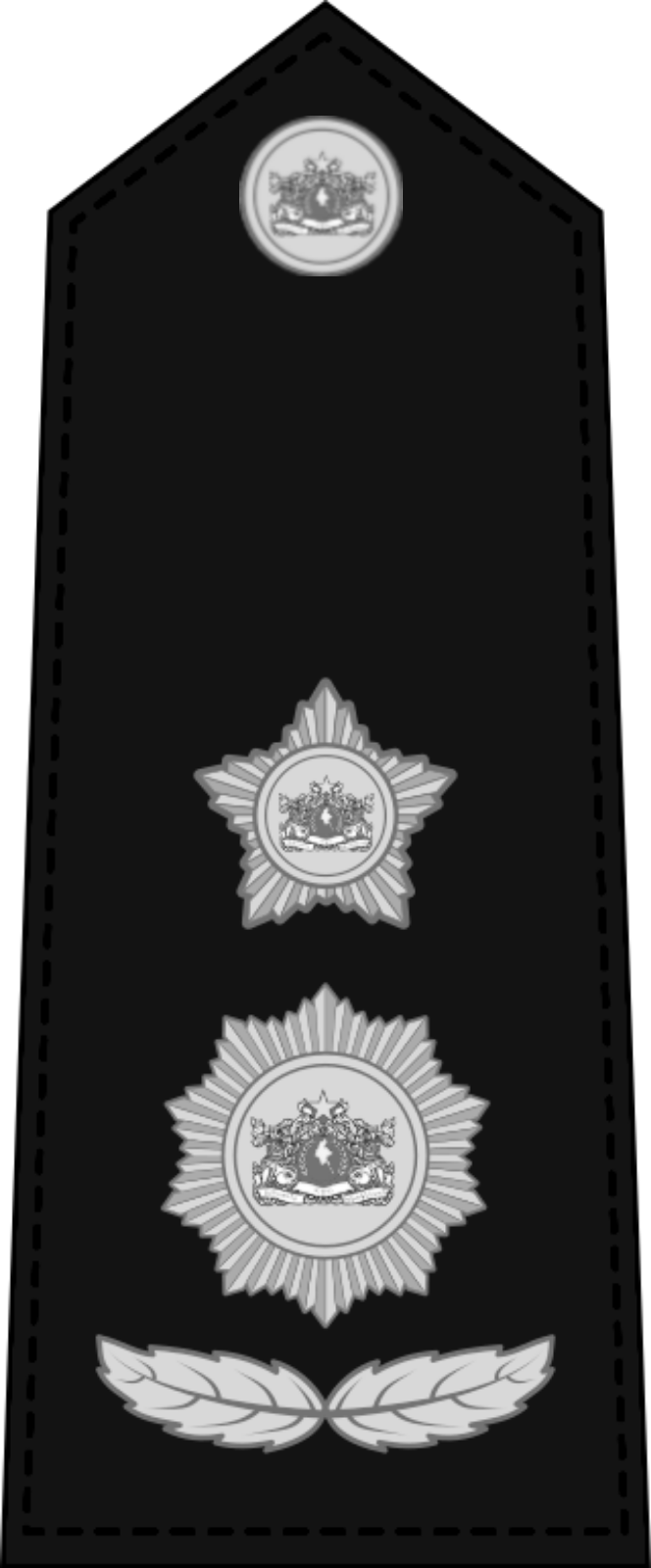
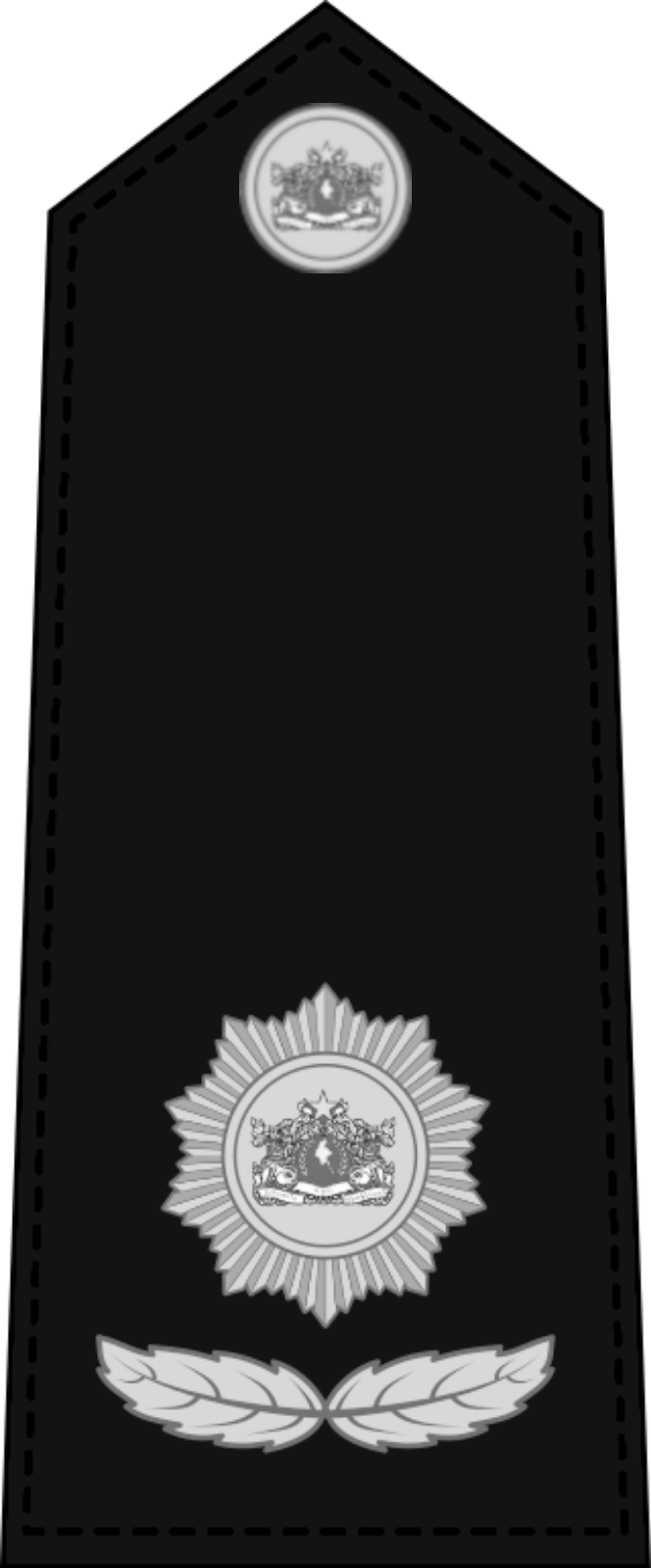
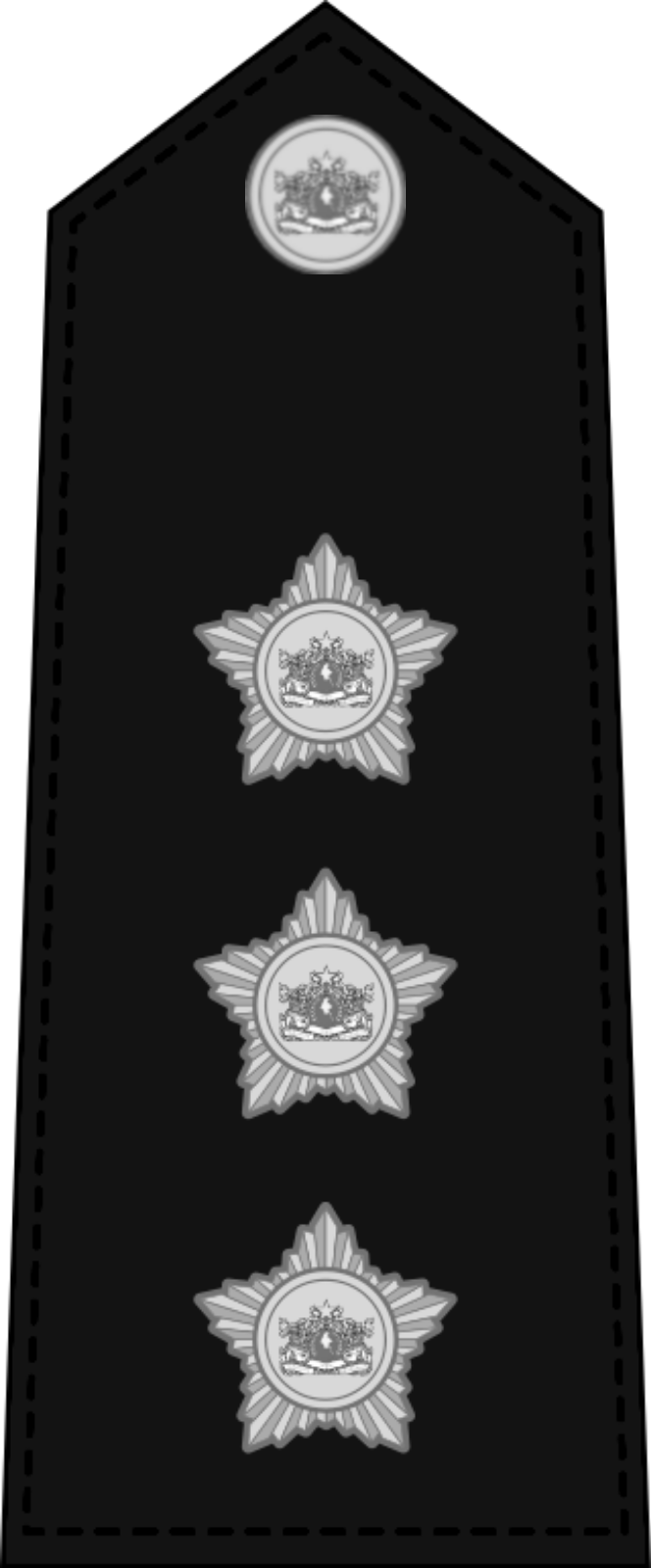
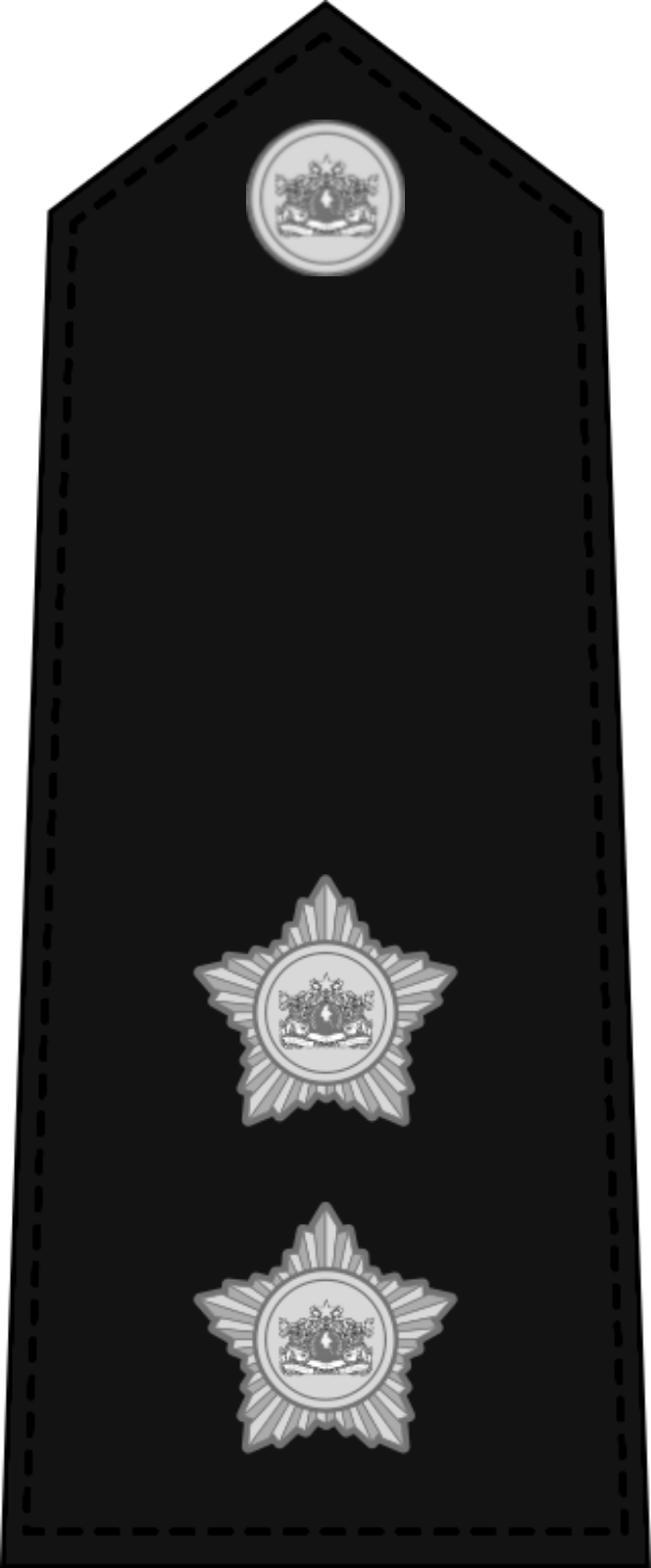
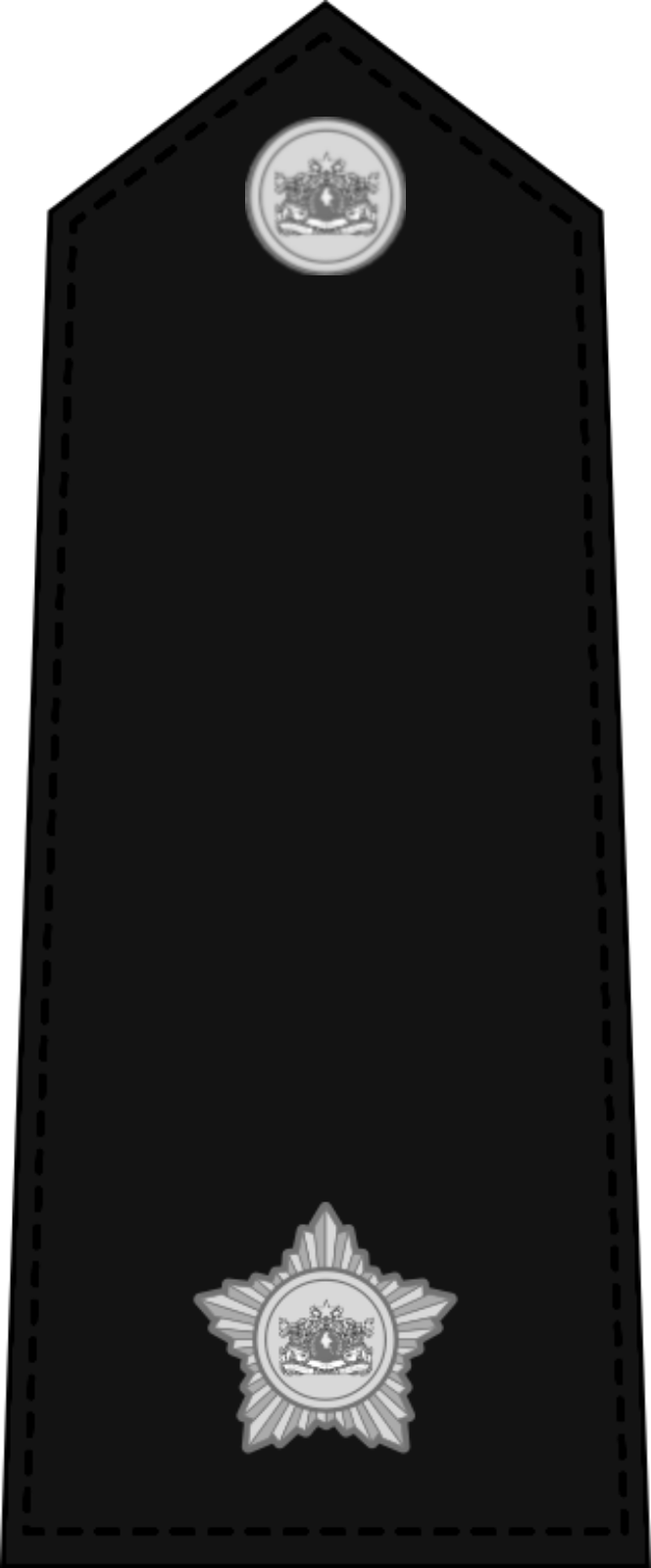
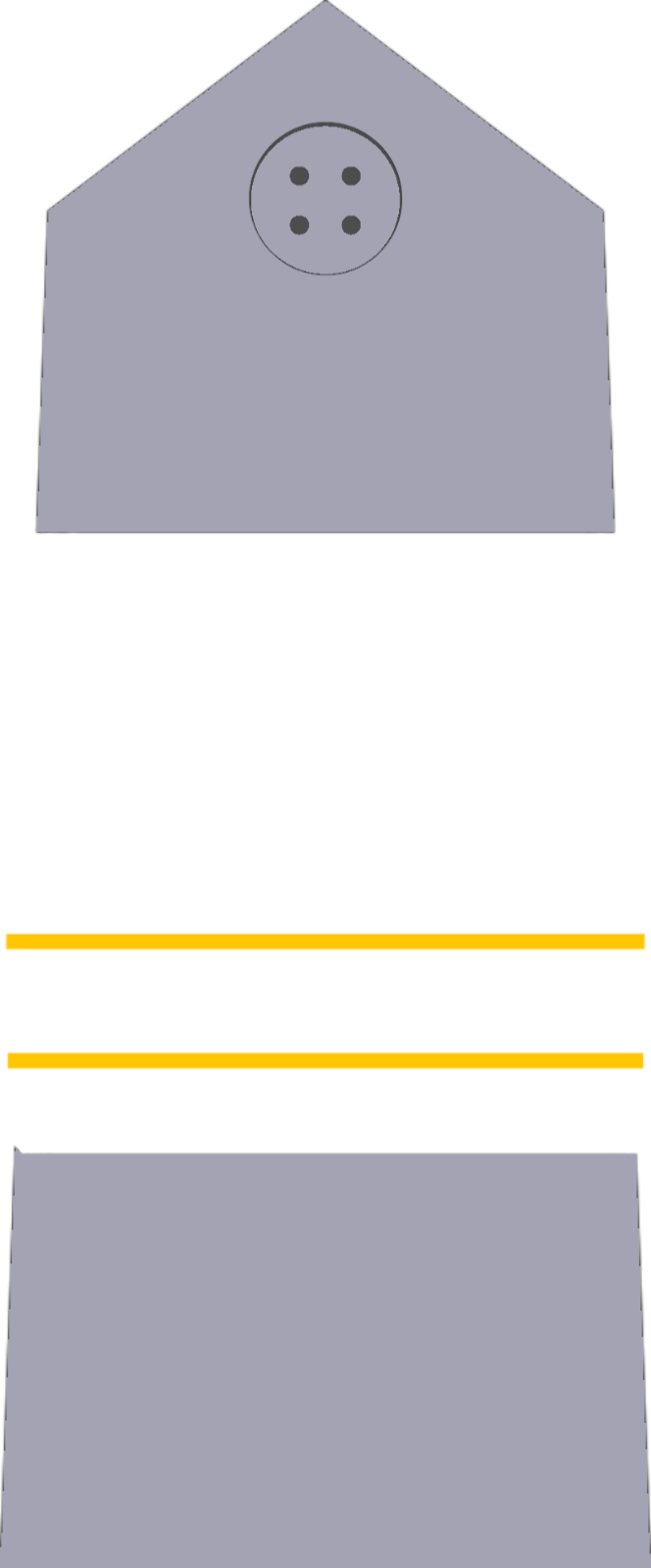
Rank group	General / flag officers				Senior officers			Junior officers
Myanmar Police Force
Myanmar Police Force	ရဲဗိုလ်ချုပ်ကြီး raaibauilaʻ khayupaʻ krīʺ	ဒုတိယရဲဗိုလ်ချုပ်ကြီး dautaiya raaibauilaʻ khayupaʻ krīʺ	ရဲဗိုလ်ချုပ် raaibauilaʻ khayupaʻ	ရဲမှူးချုပ် raaimahūʺ khayupaʻ	ရဲမှူးကြီး raaimahūʺ karī	ဒုတိယရဲမှူးကြီး dautaiya raaimahūʺ karī	ရဲမှူး raaimahūʺ	ဒုတိယရဲမှူး dautaiya raaimahūʺ	ရဲအုပ် raai ’aupaʻ	ဒုတိယရဲအုပ် dautaiya raai ’aupaʻ	ဒုတိယရဲအုပ်လောင်း dautaiya raai ’aupaʻ laoṅaʻʺ

=== Enlisted ranks ===
Rank group	Senior NCOs		Junior NCOs		Enlisted
Myanmar Police Force					No insignia	No insignia
Myanmar Police Force	ရဲအရာခံဗိုလ် Raai ’araā khaṃ bauilaʻ	ရဲတပ်ကြပ်ကြီး Raai tapaʻ karpaʻ krīʺ	ရဲတပ်ကြပ် Raai tapaʻ karpaʻ	ဒုတိယရဲတပ်ကြပ် Dautaiya tapaʻ karpaʻ	ရဲတပ်သား Raai tapaʻ saāʺ	ရဲတပ်သားသစ် Raai tapaʻ saāʺ sacaʻ

== See also ==
- Aung San
- Rangoon bombing
- Human rights in Burma
- Crime in Burma
- Bureau of Special Investigation
