= Ministry of Home Affairs (Myanmar) =

Government ministry

- ပြည်ထဲရေးဝန်ကြီးဌာန

Agency overview
- Type: Ministry
- Jurisdiction: Government of Burma
- Headquarters: Naypyidaw
- Minister responsible: General Ko Ko Oo
- Deputy Ministers responsible: Zin Min Htet; Toe Yi
- Child agency: Myanmar Police Force; Bureau of Special Investigation; Prisons Department
- Website: www.myanmarmoha.org

The Ministry of Home Affairs (Burmese: ပြည်ထဲရေးဝန်ကြီးဌာန, Pyi-dàe-yè-wun-gyì-ta-ná; abbreviated MOHA) is a government ministry that administers Myanmar's internal affairs. Headquartered in the Myanmar capital Naypyidaw, it is one of three ministries that are directly controlled by Commander-in-Chief of Defence Services.

== Objectives ==
- State Security
- Preservation of Law and Order
- Community Peace and Tranquility
- To Carry out Social Rendering Service

== Departments ==
=== Current Departments ===
- Union Minister Office
- Myanmar Police Force
- Bureau of Special Investigation
- General Administration Department
- Prisons Department
- Fire Services Department

On 28 December 2018, General Administration Department was transferred to the civilian-led Ministry of the Office of the Union Government from the Ministry of Home Affairs. After the 2021 Myanmar coup d'état, on 5 May 2021, it was reorganized under MOHA, under military leadership (State Administration Council).

== See also ==
- Cabinet of Burma
