= Cabinet of Thein Sein =

2011–2016 presidential cabinet in Myanmar

U Thein Sein cabinet
- 1st Union Government of Myanmar

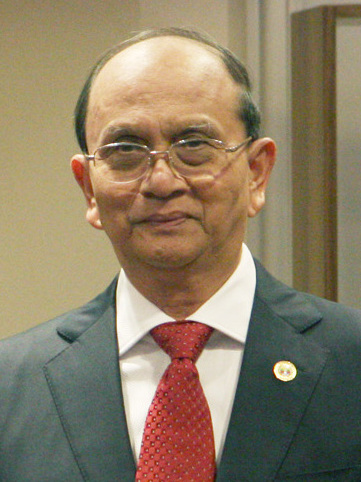
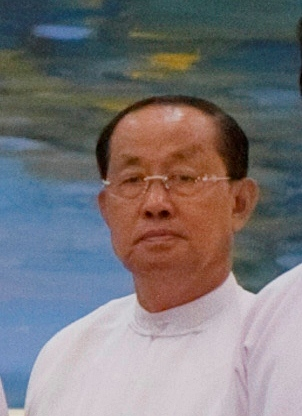
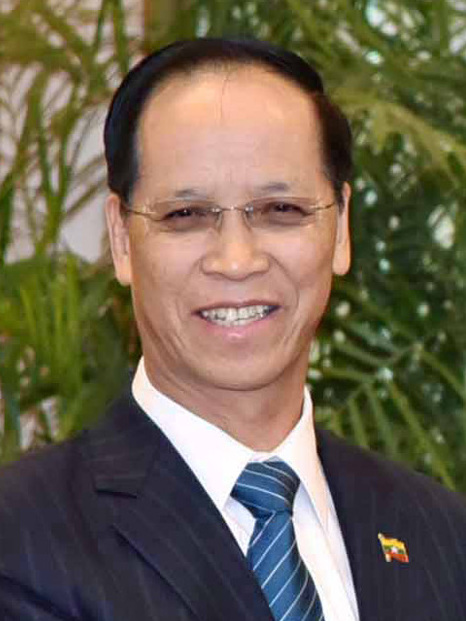
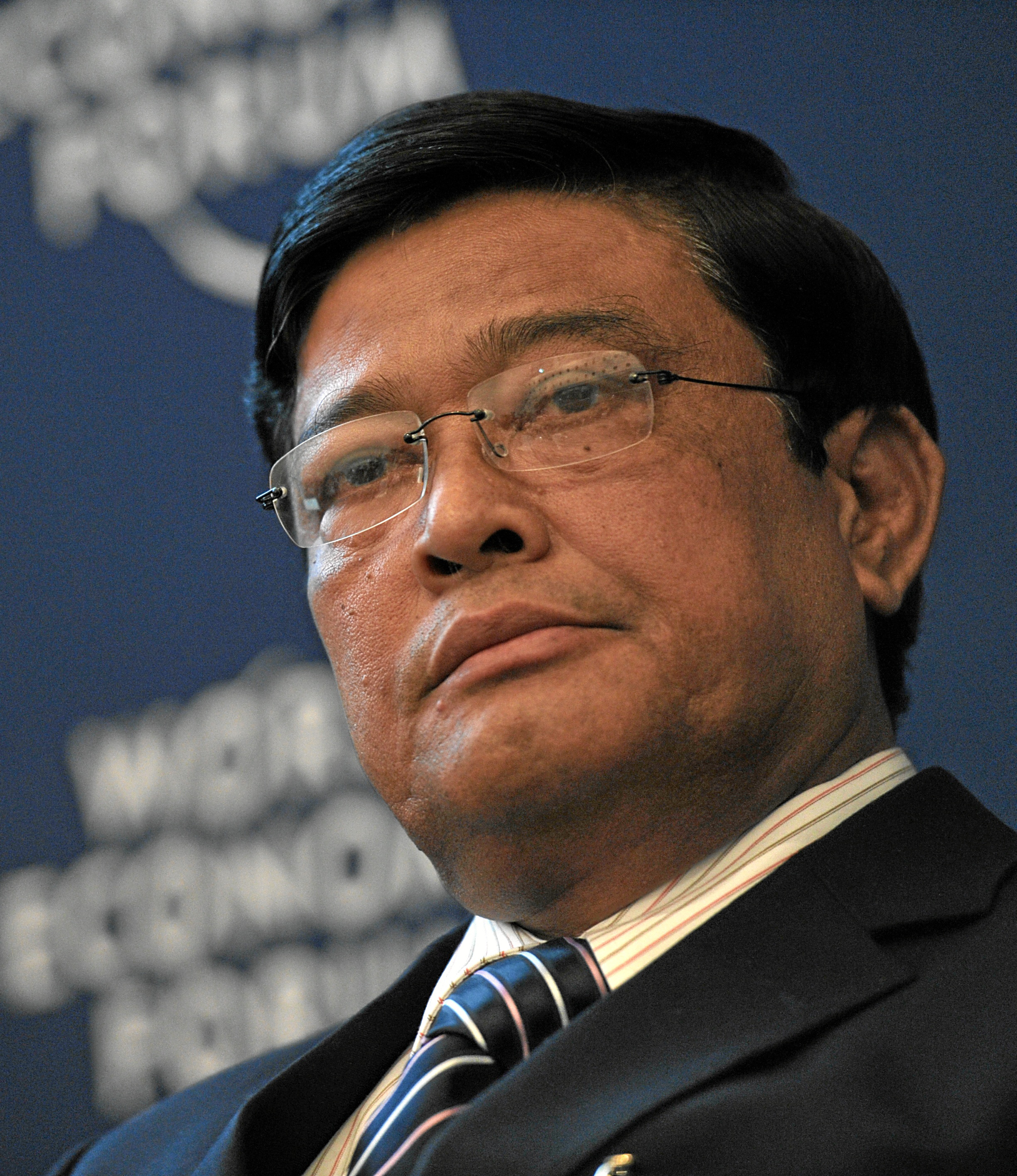
- Head and deputy heads of the government
- Date formed: 30 March 2011
- Date dissolved: 30 March 2016

People and organisations
- Head of state: Thein Sein
- Head of government: Thein Sein
- Deputy head of government: Tin Aung Myint Oo (VP) (2011–2012); Sai Mauk Kham (VP) (2011–2016); Nyan Tun (VP) (2012–2016)
- Member party: USDP–Military
- Opposition party: NLD
- Opposition leader: Aung San Suu Kyi

History
- Election: 2010 Myanmar general election
- Outgoing election: 2015 Myanmar general election
- Predecessor: Military Government
- Successor: Cabinet of Htin Kyaw

The cabinet of U Thein Sein (Burmese: ဦးသိန်းစိန် အစိုးရ) (officially Union Government of the Republic of the Union of Myanmar), headed by President Thein Sein, was the first democratically elected government of Myanmar after the military government. It took office on 30 March 2011 after the 2010 Myanmar general election to 30 March 2016.

== Cabinet ==
=== Cabinet resignations (August 2015) ===
On 12 August 2015, Minister Tin Naing Thein, Myat Hein, Khin Yi and Than Htay, who will be competing in the November 8 election had resigned, and Lt-Gen Wai Lwin and Lt-Gen Thet Naing Win had moved to their former military responsibilities, replaced by Lt-Gen Sein Win and Lt-Gen Kyaw Swe. On 9 December, minister Ko Ko Oo died and Khin San Yi co-administrated both ministries.

=== July 2014–August 2015 cabinet ===
Office	Name
Minister of Agriculture and Irrigation	Myint Hlaing
Minister of Border Affairs	Thet Naing Win, Lt. Gen.
Minister of Commerce	Win Myint
Minister of Communications and Information Technology	Myat Hein
Minister of Construction	Kyaw Lwin
Minister of Cooperatives	Kyaw Hsan
Minister of Culture	Aye Myint Kyu
Minister of Defence	Lt. Gen. Wai Lwin
Minister of Education	Khin San Yee
Minister of Electric Power	Khin Maung Soe
Minister of Energy	Zayar Aung
Minister of Finance	Win Shein
Minister of Foreign Affairs	Wunna Maung Lwin
Ministry of Environmental Conservation and Forestry	Win Tun
Minister of Health	Than Aung
Minister of Home Affairs	Lt. Gen. Ko Ko
Minister of Hotels and Tourism	Htay Aung
Minister of Immigration and Population	Khin Yi
Minister of Industry	Maung Myint
Minister of Information	Ye Htut
Minister of Labor, Employment and Social Security	Aye Myint
Minister of Livestock, Fisheries and Rural Development	Ohn Myint
Minister of Mines	Myint Aung
Minister of National Planning and Economic Development	Kan Zaw
Minister of Rail Transport	Than Htay
Minister of Religious Affairs	Soe Win
Minister of Science and Technology	Ko Ko Oo
Minister of Social Welfare, Relief and Resettlement	Myat Myat Ohn Khin
Minister of Sports	Tint Hsan
Minister of Transport	Nyan Tun Aung
Minister of President's Office	Thein Nyunt
Minister of President's Office	Soe Maung
Minister of President's Office	Soe Thein
Minister of President's Office	Aung Min
Minister of President's Office	Hla Tun
Minister of President's Office	Tin Naing Thein
Union Auditor General	Thein Htaik
Union Attorney-General	Tun Shin

=== Cabinet dismissal and resignations (June–July 2014) ===
On 19 June 2014, Hsan Sint was dismissed from the office of Minister of Religious Affairs and brought to court for corruption. He is the first Minister dismissed openly. He was succeeded by Soe Win, Deputy Minister for Religious Affairs and former Deputy Minister for Ministry of Information. Minister for Information Aung Kyi and Minister for Health Pe Thet Khin were allowed to resign on 29 July 2014. They are succeeded by Ye Htut and Than Aung, Deputy Ministers.

=== Cabinet reshuffle (September 2012–February 2013) ===
On 4 September 2012, Pyidaungsu Hluttaw approved the government's reshuffle of ministries, increasing the number to 36, including six ministers located in the President's Office. The President approved the resignation of Zaw Min, Union Minister for Electric Power-1, and Khin Maung Myint, Union Minister for Construction. The President also approved the resignation of Union Auditor-General Lun Maung on 28 August. Thein Hteik, Union Minister for Mines, was appointed as Union Auditor-General, and Lt-Gen Wai Lwin of the Office of Commander-in-Chief (Army) as Union Defence Minister. Wai Lwin was replaced Lt-Gen Hla Min, who was reassigned to the military. During the government's major cabinet reshuffle, nine ministers have been reassigned, mainly with four transferred to the President's Office and one, Aung Kyi, named as the new Minister for Information, replacing Kyaw Hsan, who was transferred to the Ministry of Cooperatives as minister. In the present reformation of the cabinet, Ministries of Electric Power No. 1 and 2 were combined into one as the Ministry of Electric Power, while the Ministry of Industrial Development was abolished.

On 16 January 2013, Minister for Communications and Information Technology, Thein Tun and Minister for Religious Affairs, Thura Myint Maung abruptly resigned. Thein Tun was the first government minister known to have been investigated for corruption under the new government. San Sint, Speaker of Ayeyarwady Region Hluttaw succeed Thura Myint Maung later. On 13 February 2013, former Commander-in-Chief of air force, General Myat Hein become minister for Communications and Information Technology.

This appointments serve as a reminder that most ministers in the government are former officers who played a role in the previous military junta. Since taking office in 2011, the reformist president, who is himself a former general, has selected former senior military officers into government as it simply continues the flawed practices of past military rule, and given only a handful of posts to people without a military background.

Office	Name
Minister of Agriculture and Irrigation	Myint Hlaing
Minister of Border Affairs	Thet Naing Win, Lt. Gen.
Minister of Commerce	Win Myint
Minister of Communications and Information Technology	Myat Hein
Minister of Construction	Kyaw Lwin
Minister of Cooperatives	Kyaw Hsan
Minister of Culture	Aye Myint Kyu
Minister of Defence	Lt. Gen. Wai Lwin
Minister of Education	Mya Aye
Minister of Electric Power	Khin Maung Soe
Minister of Energy	Than Htay
Minister of Finance	Win Shein
Minister of Foreign Affairs	Wunna Maung Lwin
Ministry of Environmental Conservation and Forestry	Win Tun
Minister of Health	Pe Thet Khin
Minister of Home Affairs	Lt. Gen. Ko Ko
Minister of Hotels and Tourism	Htay Aung
Minister of Immigration and Population	Khin Yi
Minister of Industry	Aye Myint
Minister of Information	Aung Kyi
Minister of Labor, Employment and Social Security	Maung Myint
Minister of Livestock, Fisheries and Rural Development	Ohn Myint
Minister of Mines	Myint Aung
Minister of National Planning and Economic Development	Kan Zaw
Minister of Rail Transport	Zayar Aung
Minister of Religious Affairs	Hsan Sint
Minister of Science and Technology	Ko Ko Oo
Minister of Social Welfare, Relief and Resettlement	Myat Myat Ohn Khin
Minister of Sports	Tint Hsan
Minister of Transport	Nyan Tun Aung
Minister of President's Office	Thein Nyunt
Minister of President's Office	Soe Maung
Minister of President's Office	Soe Thein
Minister of President's Office	Aung Min
Minister of President's Office	Hla Tun
Minister of President's Office	Tin Naing Thein
Union Auditor General	Thein Htaik
Union Attorney-General	Tun Shin

=== Inaugural Cabinet (March 2011) ===
The Cabinet was sworn in on 30 March 2011 at the Hluttaw complex in Naypyidaw, after being appointed by President Thein Sein. Four ministers, namely of the Ministry of Defence, Ministry of Home Affairs, Ministry of Foreign Affairs and the Ministry of Border Affairs were nominated by Commander-in-Chief Than Shwe. Two ministries, the Ministry of the President's Office and the Ministry of Industrial Development were created by the Hluttaw (Parliament) on 9 February 2011.

The overwhelming majority of Ministers are Union Solidarity and Development Party members of parliament or military officers affiliated with the former State Peace and Development Council (SPDC), and four are civilians. 12 have previously held ministerial posts, while another 7 have held deputy ministerial posts during the SPDC administration. 3 are former regional army commanders. On 10 August 2011, the cabinet was reshuffled, with Kyaw Swa Khaing, previously the Minister of Industry No. 1 (with Minister of Industry No. 2, Soe Thein, concurrently becoming head of the Ministry of Industry-1), appointed as co-Minister of the President's Office.

Cabinet of the Government of Myanmar
Ministry	Minister Name	Party	Notes
Ministry of Home Affairs	Ko Ko	Military	former SPDC Chief of the Bureau of Special Operations-3
Ministry of Defence	Hla Min	Military	former SPDC Southern Command Commander
Ministry of Border Affairs	Thein Htay	Military	former SPDC Deputy Minister of Defence, Vice-Chief of Ordinance, and Chief of Military Ordinance
Ministry of Industrial Development	Thein Htay	Military	former SPDC Deputy Minister of Defence, Vice-Chief of Ordinance, and Chief of Military Ordinance
Ministry of Foreign Affairs	Wunna Maung Lwin	Military	former Ambassador to the United Nations (2007-2011)
Ministry of Information	Kyaw Hsan	Military	former SPDC Minister of Information and Brigadier General
Ministry of Culture	Kyaw Hsan	Military	former SPDC Minister of Information and Brigadier General
Ministry of Agriculture and Irrigation	Myint Hlaing	USDP	former SPDC Northeast Command Commander and Air Force Chief of Staff
Ministry of Commerce	Wunna Kyawhtin Win Myint	USDP	former President of Union of the Myanmar Federation of Chambers of Commerce and Industry
Ministry of Construction	Khin Maung Myint	USDP	former SPDC Minister of Electric Power-2, Minister of Construction and Major General
Ministry of Hotels and Tourism	Tint Hsan	USDP	
Ministry of Sports	Tint Hsan	USDP	
Ministry of Communications, Posts and Telegraphs	Thein Tun	USDP	former SPDC Deputy Minister for Communications, Posts and Telegraphs and Major General
Ministry of Finance and Revenue	Hla Tun	USDP	former SPDC Minister of Finance and Revenue and Major General
Ministry of Mines	Thein Htaik	USDP	former Lieutenant General
Ministry of Transport	Nyan Tun Aung	USDP	former SPDC Deputy Minister of Transport
Ministry of National Planning and Economic Development	Tin Naing Thein	USDP	former SPDC Minister of Livestock and Fisheries and Brigadier General
Ministry of Livestock and Fisheries	Tin Naing Thein	USDP	former SPDC Minister of Livestock and Fisheries and Brigadier General
Ministry of Environmental Conservation and Forestry	Win Tun	Military	former SPDC Minister of Forestry Director
Ministry of Labor	Aung Kyi	USDP	former SPDC Minister of Labor
Ministry of Social Welfare, Relief and Resettlement	Aung Kyi	USDP	former SPDC Minister of Labor
Ministry of Cooperatives	Ohn Myint	USDP	former SPDC Bureau of Special Operations-6, Northern Command Commander and Lieutenant General
Ministry of Industry	Soe Thein	USDP	former SPDC Minister of Industry-2 and Lieutenant-General
Ministry of Energy	Than Htay	USDP	former SPDC Deputy Minister of Energy
Ministry of Rail Transportation	Aung Min	USDP	former SPDC Minister of Rail Transportation
Ministry of Education	Mya Aye	–	former rector of the Mandalay University
Ministry of Religious Affairs	Myint Maung	USDP	former SPDC Minister of Religious Affairs
Ministry of Immigration and Population	Khin Yi	Military	former SPDC Brigadier General, Chief of National Police, and SPDC Deputy Minister of Home Affairs
Ministry of Electric Power-1	Zaw Min	USDP	former SPDC Minister of Electric Power-1 and Colonel
Ministry of Electric Power-2	Khin Maung Soe	–	former Chairman of the Yangon City Electric Power Supply Board
Ministry of Science and Technology	Aye Myint	USDP	former SPDC Minister of Sports, Deputy Minister of Defence, and Major General
Ministry of President's Office	Soe Maung; Thein Nyunt; Kyaw Swa Khaing	USDP; USDP; USDP	former Lieutenant General, Judge Advocate General, and Military Judge General former SPDC Minister of Progress of Border Areas, National Races and Development Affairs and Mayor of Naypyidaw (2006-2011); SPDC Deputy Minister of Industry-2 and General
Ministry of Health	Pe Thet Khin	–	Former rector at University of Medicine 1, Yangon

== Heads and Ministers ==
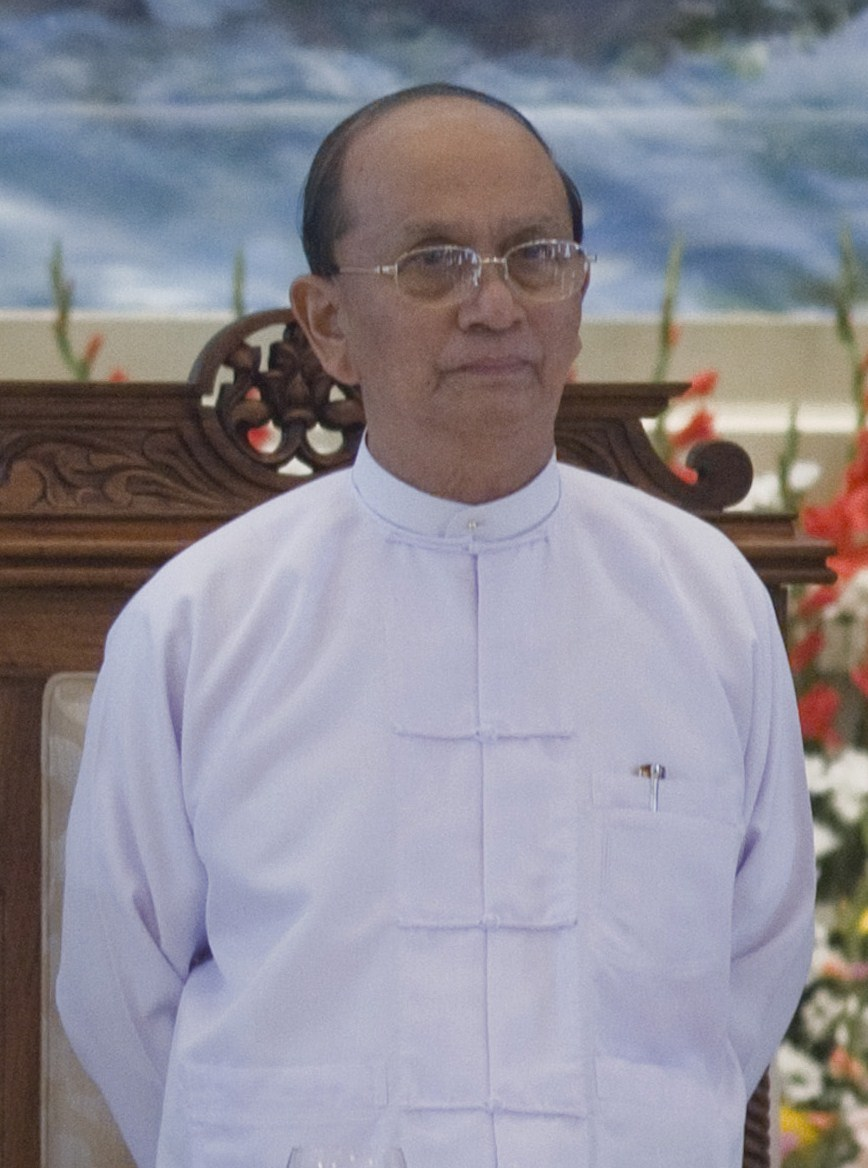
President

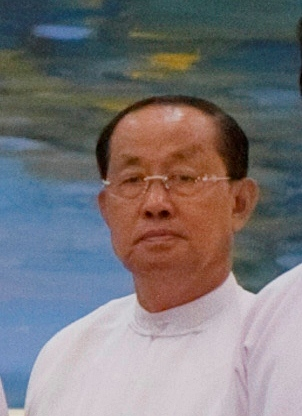
First Vice President

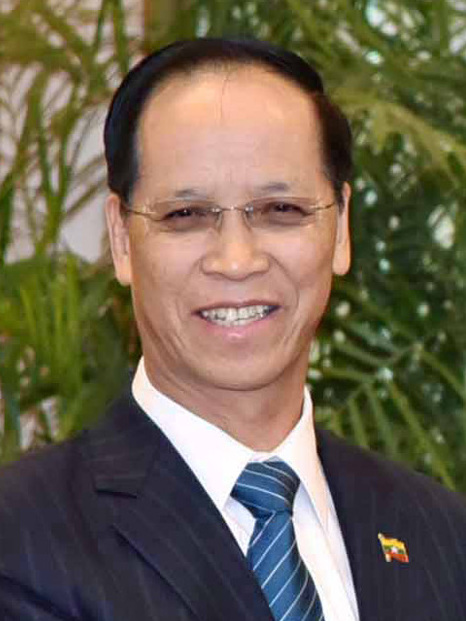
Second and First Vice President

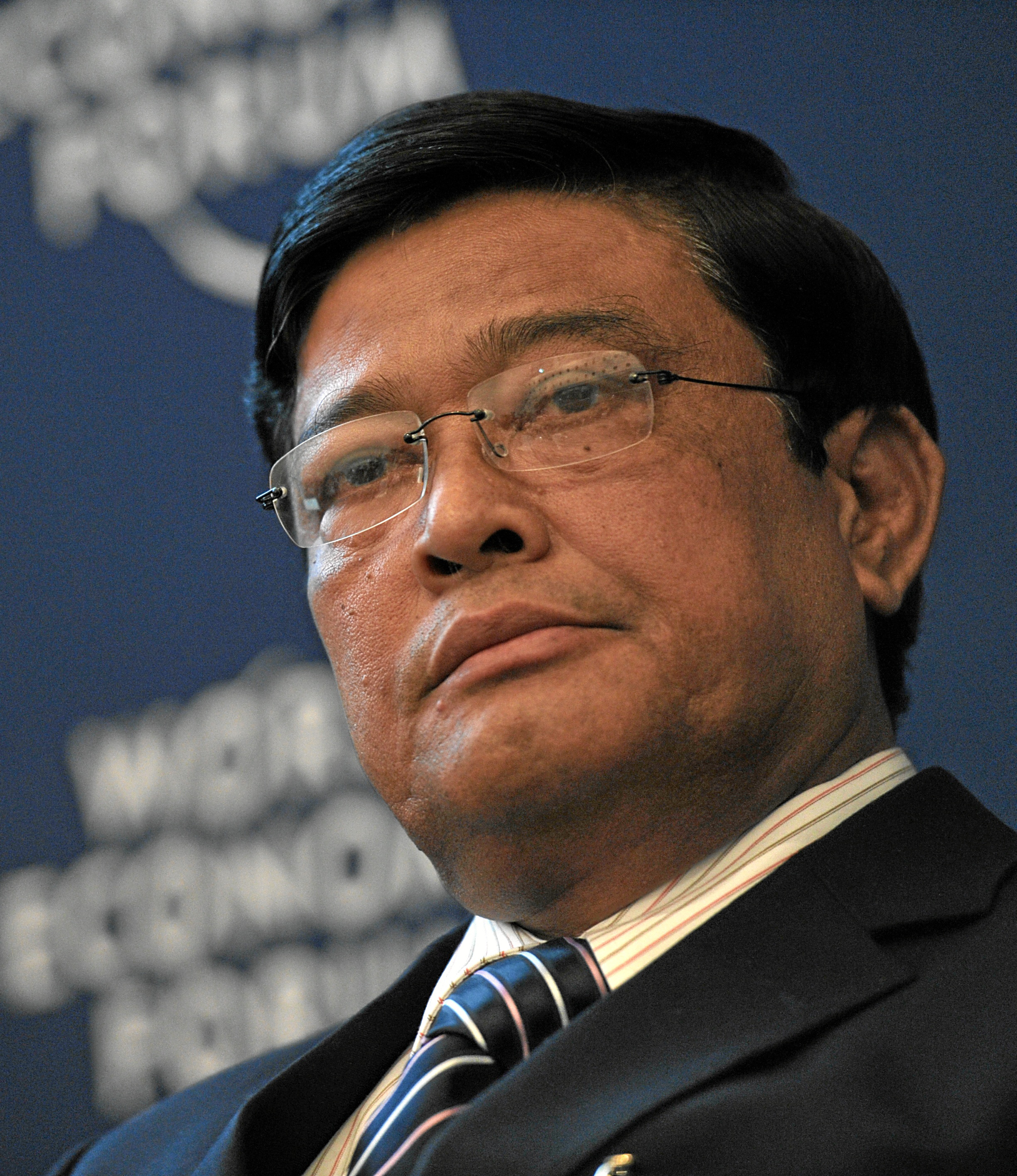
Second Vice President

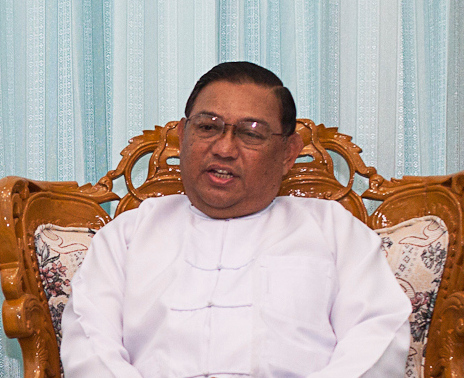
Foreign Minister

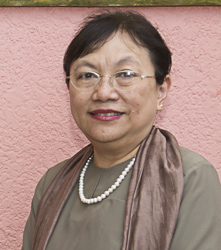
Education Minister

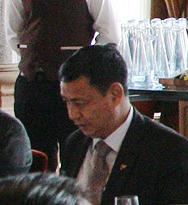
Information Minister

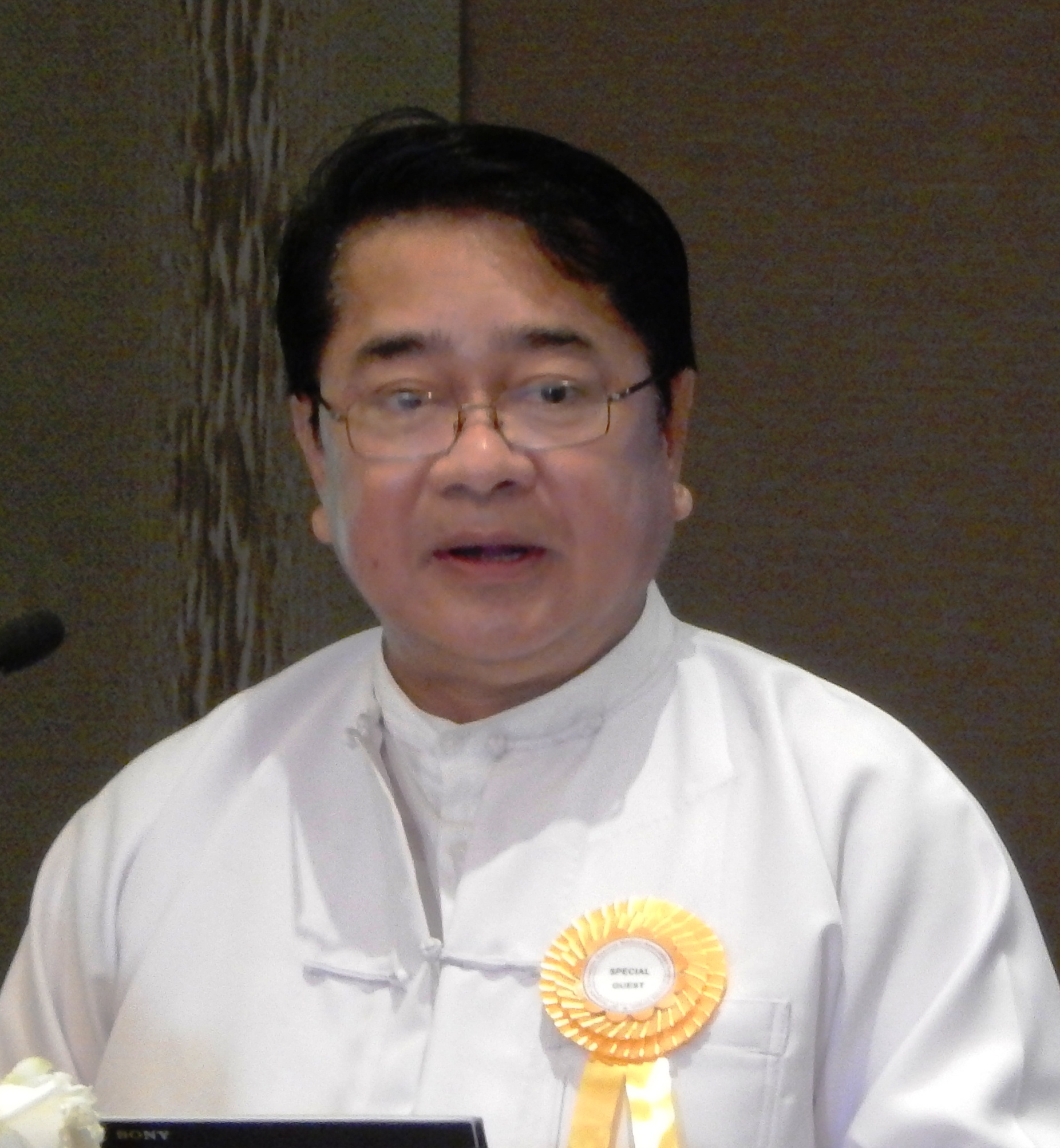
Health Minister

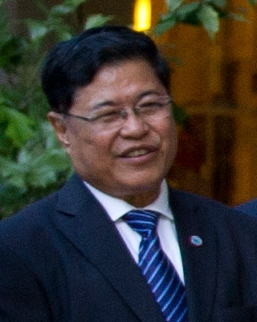
President Office Minister

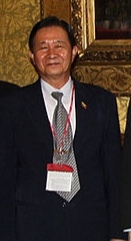
President Office Minister

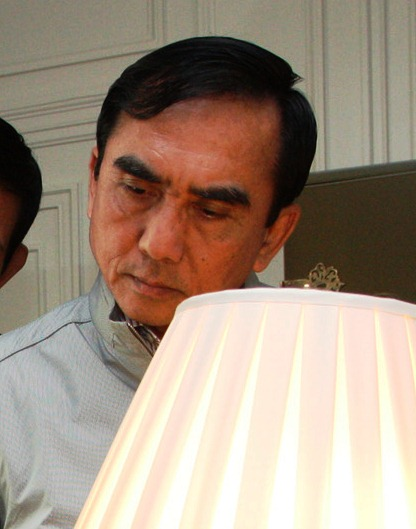
Communications and Information Technology Minister

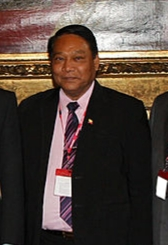
Immigration Minister

== Distant Tasks Carried Out ==
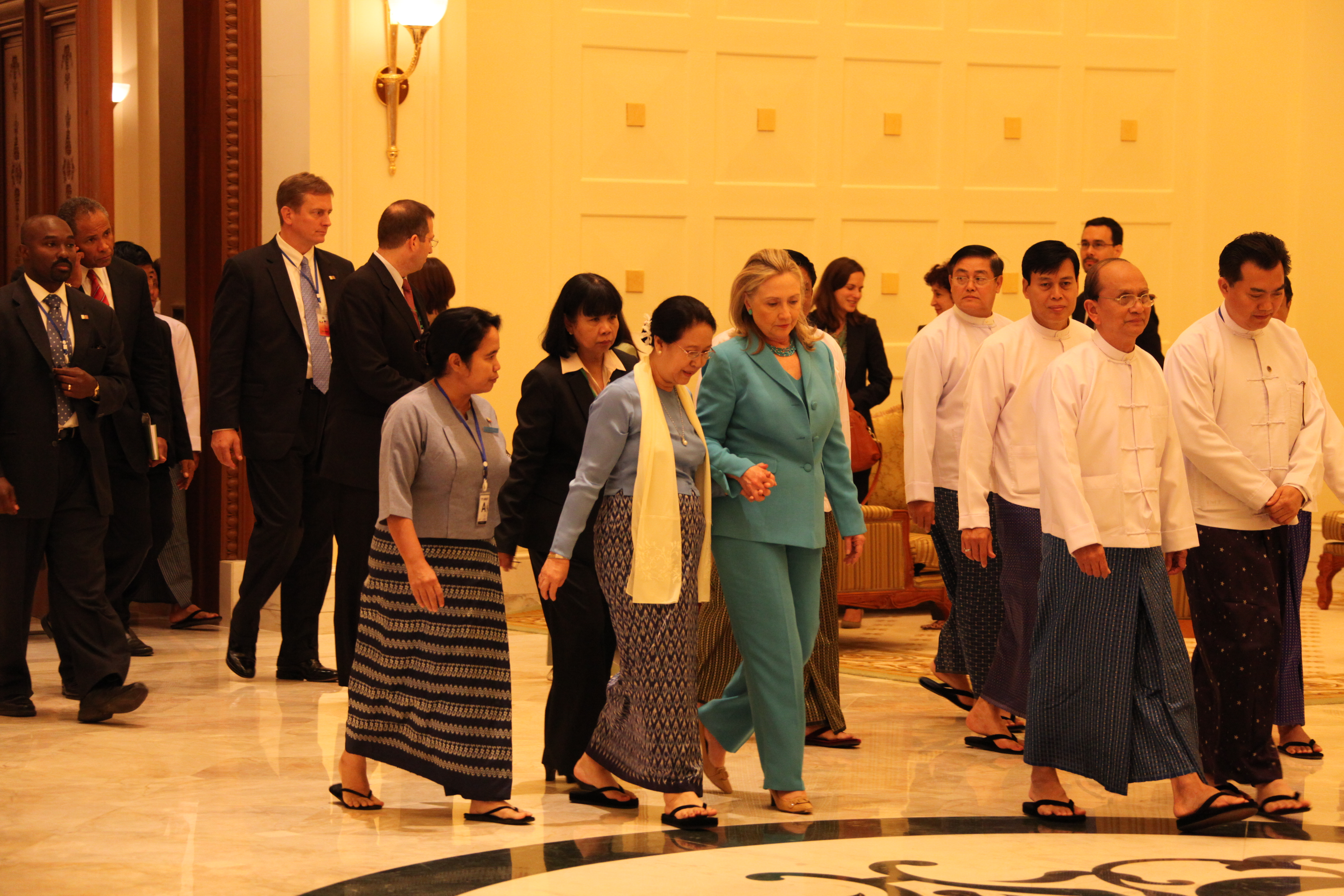
President, First Lady and Hillary Clinton at Presidential Palace, Naypyidaw

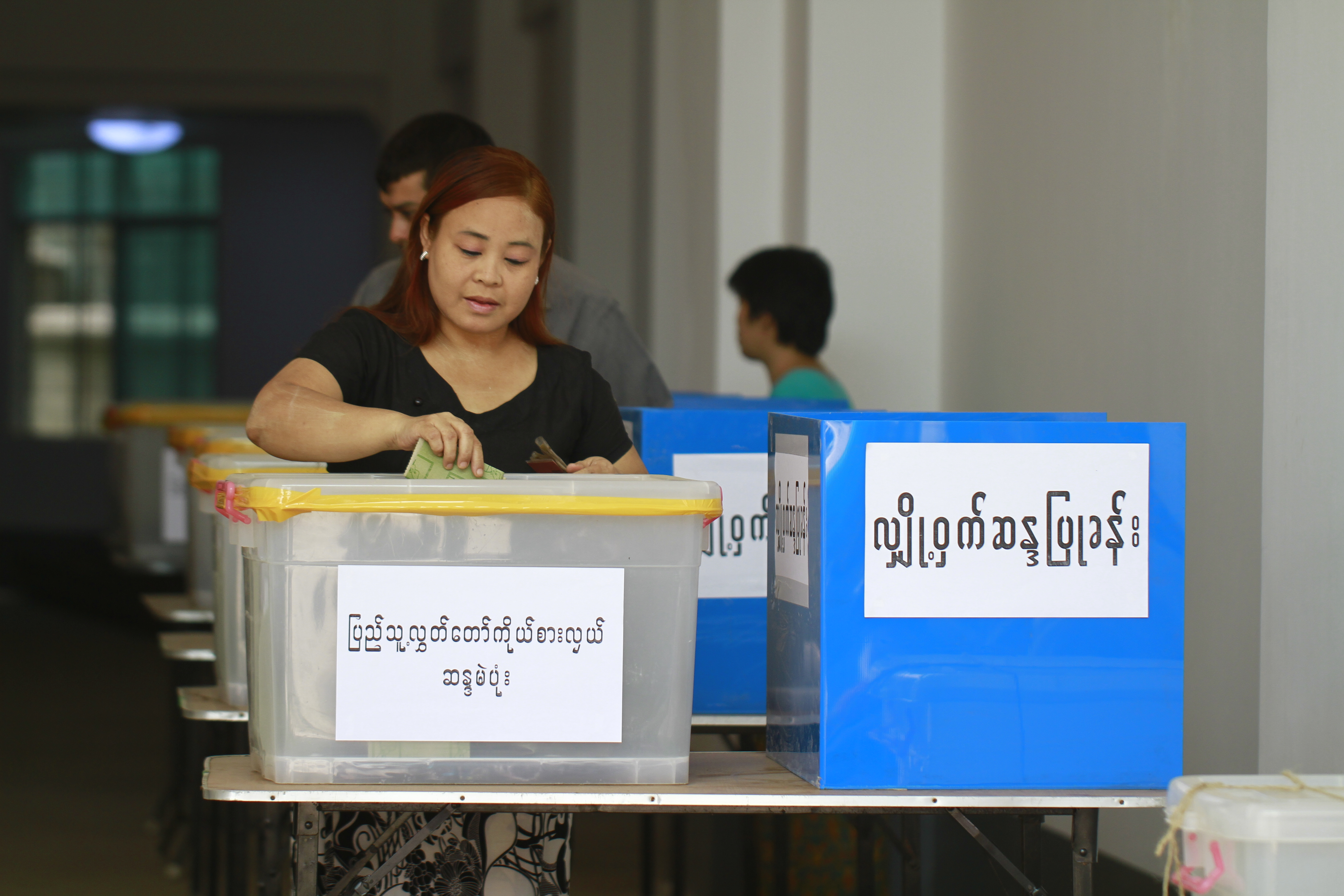
A woman in by-elections

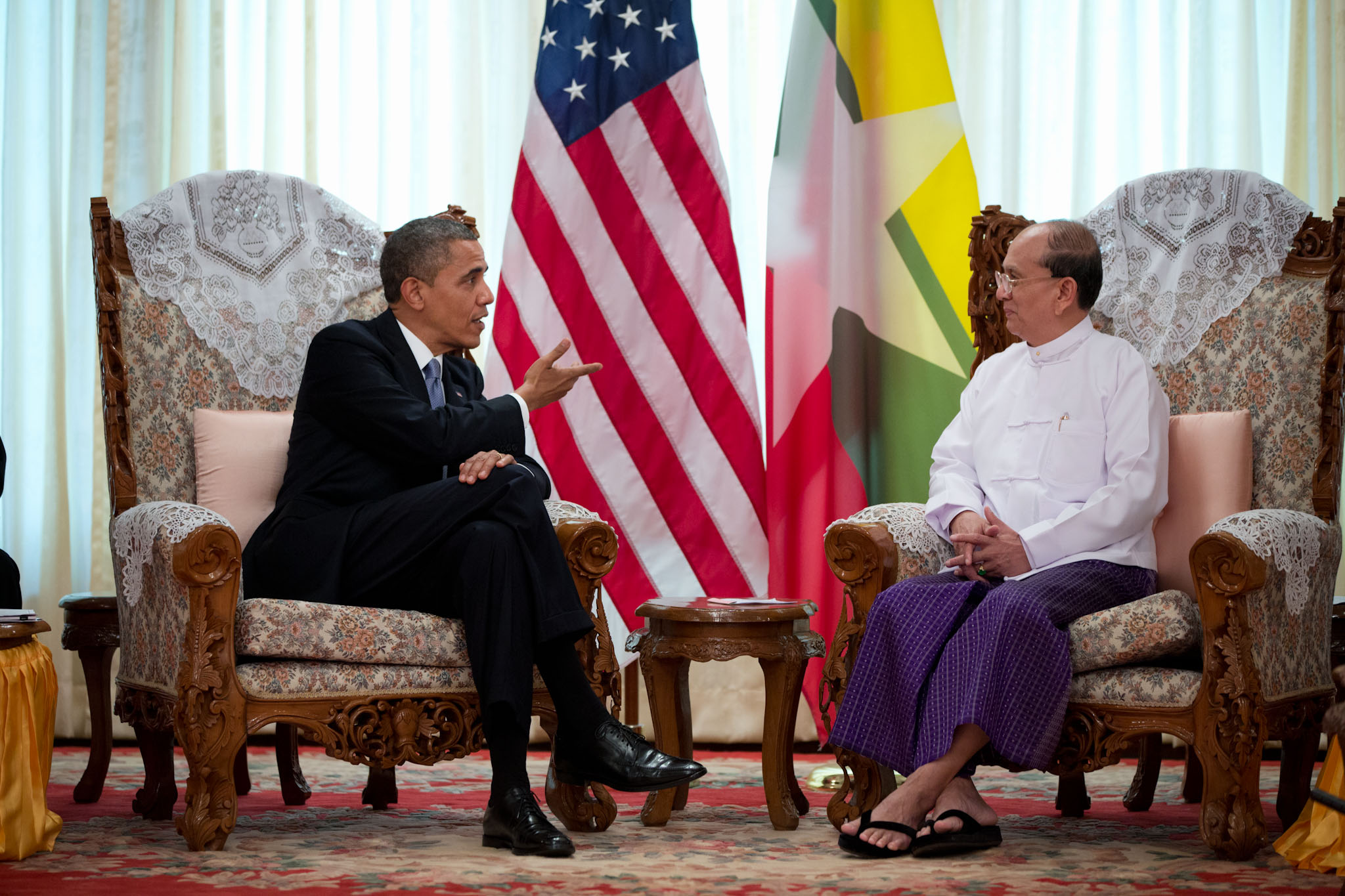
Obama and Thein Sein at Yangon Region Parliament

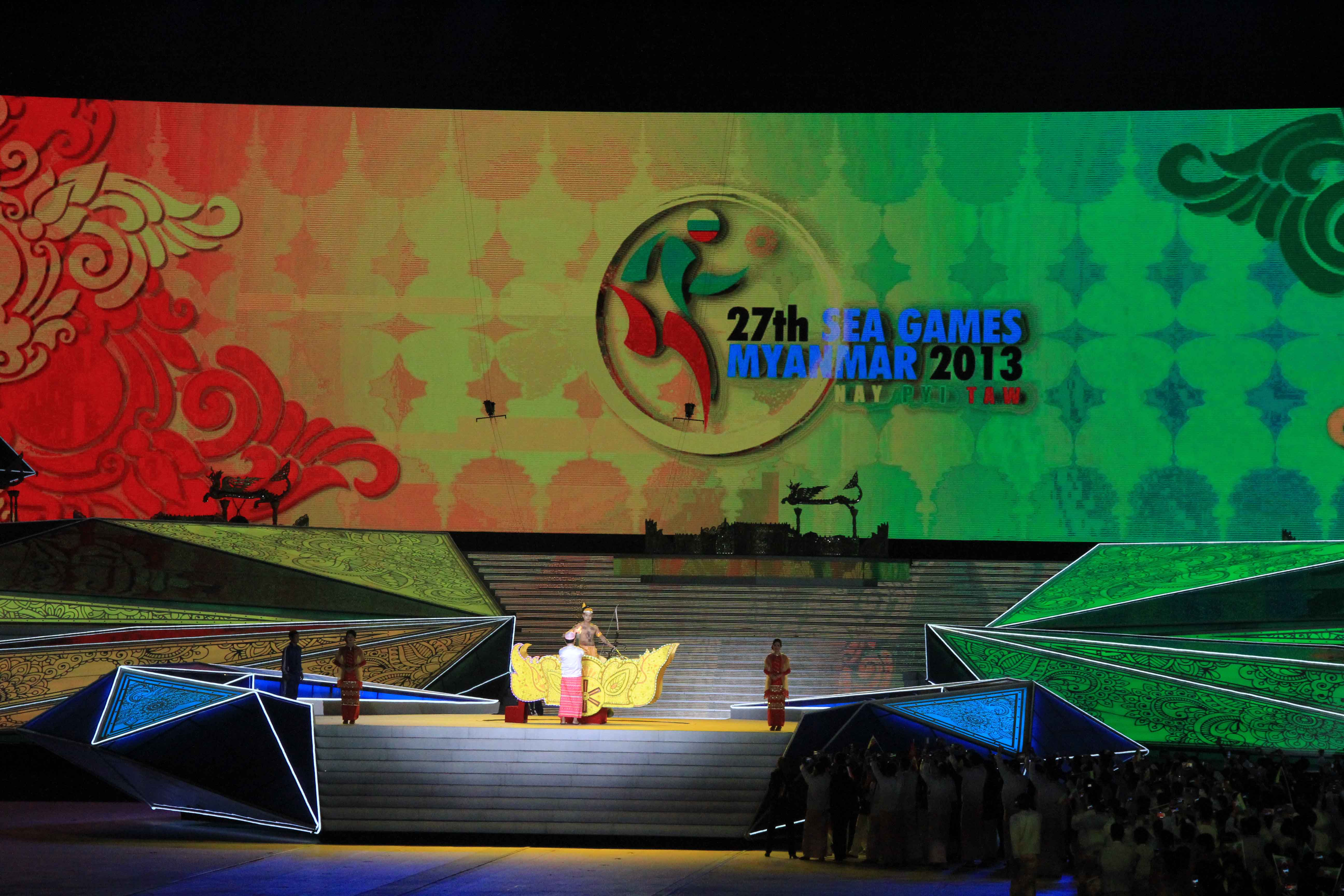
opening ceremony of 27th SEA Games

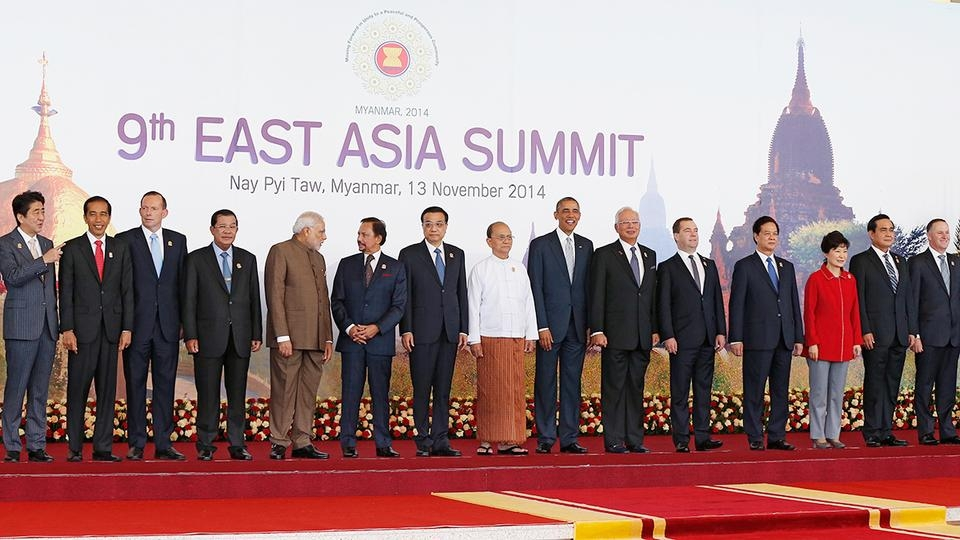
Leaders at the Summit

2011

- 30 September (Myitsone Dam) – On 30 September 2011, in an address to the parliament, President Thein Sein announced that the Myitsone Dam project would be halted during the term of his government.
- U.S Secretary, Hillary Clinton Visit (1 December) – The United States Secretary, Hillary Clinton visited Naypyidaw and met with Cabinet's head Thein Sein. She is the first US state secretary to visit Myanmar in fifty years.

2012

- 2012 Myanmar by-elections (1 April) – The UEC held the by-election in April. This make the opponent leader, Aung San Su Kyi and her party members able to the Parliament. Aung San Su Kyi became the representative for Myanmar lower parliament, Pyithu Hluttaw from Kawhmu Township.
- At UN Head Quarter (27 September) - The head of the government addressees the 67th United Nations General Assembly at the head quarter, New York.
- Obama First Visit (19 November) – United States President Barack Obama visited to Yangon for one day. He met with Cabinet's head Thein Sein at Yangon Region Parliament. He became the first US president to visit Myanmar.

2013

- 27th SEA Games – The Cabinet held the 27th SEA Games after 44 years later the last hosted in Yangon in 1969 as 5th SEAP Games.The game was hosted in Naypyidaw, Yangon, Mandalay and Ngwe Saung. The games were officially opened on 11 December 2013 and closed on 22 December 2013 by the VP Nyan Tun. The opening and closing ceremonies were held with the wonderful exploration of fireworks and many volunteers. It can be said the greatest event in Myanmar history. But, the critics said that the million dollar of money spent on the ceremonies are only wasted.

2014

- 2014 ASEAN Para Games – The ASEAN Para Games was held in January 2014 after the 27th SEA Games. The games were officially opened on January 14 and closed on 20 January by VPs Sai Mauk Kham and Nyan Tun.
- 9th EAS Summit (12-13 November) – The cabinet hosted the Ninth East Asia Summit.
- ASEAN Chairman and ASEAN Summits – The head of the cabinet, Thein Sein chaired the 24th and 25th ASEAN Summits. 24th Summit was held on 4–5 May and the 25th Summit was on 12–13 November. The ASEAN leaders adopted the Nay Pyi Taw Declaration on the ASEAN Community’s Post-2015 Vision and the Declaration on Strengthening the ASEAN Secretariat and Reviewing the ASEAN Organs and the ASEAN Joint Statement on Climate Change at the 25th ASEAN Summit.

2015

- Grand Military Review Parade Ceremony (Burmese: ဗိုလ်ရှုသဘင်)(4 January) - The head attended to the ceremony which was held in the 67th Independent day of Myanmar.
- Nationwide Ceasefire Agreement(15 October)-The cabinet signed Nationwide Ceasefire Agreement which is a milestone in peace process.

== See also ==
- Cabinet of Myanmar
