= Union Solidarity and Development Association =

1993–2010 mass organisation in Myanmar

- Merged into: Union Solidarity and Development Party
- Founded: 15 September 1993 (33 years, 48 days)
- Dissolved: 15 July 2010 (16 years, 110 days)
- Type: Organisation
- Location: Yangon
- Region served: Union of Myanmar
- Method: Media attention, direct-appeal campaigns Political lobbying
- Key people: General Htay Oo (Secretary General)
- Website: www.usda.org.mm

The Union Solidarity and Development Association (Burmese: ပြည်ထောင်စုကြံ့ခိုင်ရေးနှင့်ဖွံ့ဖြိုးရေးအသင်း, MLCTS: prany htaung cu kri. re: hnang. hpwam. hprui: ye: a. sang: [pjìdàʊɰ̃zṵ tɕã̰kʰàɪɰ̃ jéi n̥ɪ̰ɰ̃ pʰʊ̰ɰ̃pʰjó jéi əθɪ́ɰ̃]; abbreviated USDA) was a Burmese political party founded with the active aid of Myanmar's ruling military junta, the State Law and Order Restoration Council (SLORC), on 15 September 1993.

== History ==
The Union Solidarity and Development Party (USDP), formed on 29 April 2010, took part in the 2010 elections. All civil servants and members under the age of 25 were purged from the USDA, the remaining members were enrolled into the USDP. All assets of the USDA were transferred to the USDP leading to the disbanding of the USDA.

Htay Oo was the secretary general of the organisation. Its headquarters were in Yangon, Myanmar, and operated nationwide.

On 19 October 2008, a small bomb exploded in the Htan Chauk Pin quarter of the Shwepyitha Township office of the USDA, resulting in property damage and the death of one person. According to the New Light of Myanmar, the victim was identified as Thet Oo Win, a former Buddhist monk who participated in the Saffron Revolution. He was reportedly killed while improvising the bomb at his own residence. The junta blamed the National League for Democracy party for planting that bomb, but experts believed at the time that the opposition was not in a position to carry out such acts amidst the tightly controlled security environment.

== Objective ==
The motto of the organisation was "Morale, Discipline, Solidarity, Unity."

1. Non-disintegration of the Union
2. Non-disintegration of national solidarity
3. Perpetuation of sovereignty
4. Dynamism of Patriotic Spirit with a view to promoting national prestige and integrity
5. Development of the nation and emergence of a peaceful and modern state

== Main members ==
Central Panel of Patrons:

- Senior General Than Shwe
- Vice-Senior General Maung Aye
- General Thura Shwe Mann
- Prime Minister General Thein Sein
- Secretary-1 General Thiha Thura Tin Aung Myint Oo

Secretariat:

- Secretary-General: U Htay Oo – Minister of Agriculture
- Joint Secretary-General : U Zaw Min – Minister for Electric Power No. (1)
- U Thaung – Minister of Science and Technology
- U Tin Htut – Minister for Cooperatives
- U Aung Thaung – Minister of Industrial No(1)
- U Thein Zaw – Minister of Post and Telecommunication
- U Kyaw Hsan – Minister of Information

Central Executive Committee:

- U Thein Nyunt – Minister of Progress of Border Areas, National Races and Development Affairs, Mayor of Naypyidaw
- U Nyan Tun Aung – Deputy Minister of Transport
- Dr Chan Nyein – Minister of Education
- U Khin Maung Myint – Minister for Electric Power No. (2)
- U Soe Tha – Minister of National Planning and Economic Development
- U Tin Naing Thein – Minister for Commerce
- U Thein Aung- Minister for Forestry
- Thura U Aung Ko – Deputy Minister for Religious Affairs
- U Maung Pa – Deputy Mayor of Yangon City
- U Than Htay- Deputy Minister for Energy
- U Ohn Myint – Minister of Mine
- U Maung Maung Thein – Minister of Livestock and Fishery
- Thura U Aye Myint – Minister of Sport
- U Thein Swe – Minister of Transport
- U Aung Min – Minister of Train Transport
- U Phone Swe- Deputy Minister for Home Affairs
- Thura U Myint Maung – Minister of Religious Affairs
- U Aung Thein Lin – Mayor of Yangon City

== Organization ==
The USDA comprised 1 Headquarters, 17 State and Division Associations, 66 District Associations and 320 Township Associations. As of 30 April 2007, the Association had 24 million members.
