= Office of the President of Myanmar =

Office of the President of Myanmar Ministry of the President's Office
- နိုင်ငံတော်သမ္မတရုံး

Agency overview
- Type: Ministry
- Jurisdiction: Government of Myanmar
- Headquarters: President Office - Presidential Palace, Naypyidaw; Ministry - Office No. 18, Naypyidaw
- Ministers responsible: Khin Maung Yi, Union Minister attached to the Office of the President; Tin Aung San, Union Minister of the President's Office; Htin Kyaw Thu, Deputy Union Minister of the President's Office
- Website: presoffministry.gov.mm

The Office of the President of the Republic of the Union of Myanmar (Burmese: ပြည်ထောင်စုသမ္မတမြန်မာနိုင်ငံတော် နိုင်ငံတော်သမ္မတရုံး) is a ministry-level body that serves the President of Myanmar.

== History ==
On 4 September 2012, the Pyidaungsu Hluttaw approved an expansion of the office from two ministries into six to improve efficiencies on ongoing peace processes, preparations for the 2013 Southeast Asian Games and Burma's hosting of the 2014 ASEAN Summit. On 9 January 2013 Thein Sein appointed deputy Minister of Information Ye Htut as his office's first official spokesperson. The responsibility had been previously handled by Zaw Htay, the office's director. The office has since been reduced to one ministry under President Htin Kyaw. After President Htin Kyaw, Win Myint served as the President of Myanmar.

From 2016 to 2021, the State Counsellor is Aung San Suu Kyi. She also served as Minister of Foreign Affairs. She played a vital role in Myanmar's transition from military junta to partial democracy in the 2010s and won the 2020 elections but on 1 February 2021, she was detained by the military during the 2021 Myanmar coup d'état.

After the coup, SAC renamed the office as the Office of the State Administration Council Chairman.

== List of ministers (2011–present) ==
No.	Portrait	Name	Term of office			Political party
No.	Portrait	Name	Took office	Left office	Time in office	Political party
1(a)		Thein Nyunt	30 March 2011	30 March 2016	5 years, 0 days	Union Solidarity and Development Party
1(b)		Soe Maung	30 March 2011	30 March 2016	5 years, 0 days	Union Solidarity and Development Party
1(c)		Soe Thein	27 August 2012	30 March 2016	3 years, 216 days	Union Solidarity and Development Party
1(d)		Aung Min	27 August 2012	30 March 2016	3 years, 216 days	Union Solidarity and Development Party
1(e)		Hla Tun	27 August 2012	30 March 2016	3 years, 216 days	Union Solidarity and Development Party
1(f)		Tin Naing Thein	27 August 2012	30 March 2016	3 years, 216 days	Union Solidarity and Development Party
2		Aung San Suu Kyi	30 March 2016	1 February 2021	4 years, 308 days	National League for Democracy
3		Tin Aung San	31 July 2025 (as Union Minister of Ministry 1 of the President's Office) 10 April 2026	Present	1 year, 9 days	Union Solidarity and Development Party

== Presidential advisors (2011–2016) ==
Thein Sein has appointed several presidential advisory board during his term, including economics, legal, education, and religious affairs committees. A 9-member advisory board was appointed on 19 April 2011, under Notification No. 1/2011. On 18 June 2014, the team was expanded to include religious affairs advisors, led by Myint Maung and Sein Win Aung, a former ambassador who is the father-in-law of Thein Sein's daughter.

As of 2014, the advisory teams and leaders included:

- Political affairs: Ko Ko Hlaing
- Economic affairs: U Myint
- Legal affairs: Sit Aye
- Religious affairs: Myint Maung
- Education affairs: Yin Yin Nwe
- Health affairs: ?

== Departments ==
- Union Minister Office
- President Staff Office
- Vice President (1) Staff Office
- Vice President (2) Staff Office
- Politics and Security Department
- Economic Department
- Social and Culture Department
- Administration and Finance Department
- Department of Houses
- Department of Chief Security Officer
- Research, Information and Complaints Department

== Headquarters ==
Presidential Palace, the official residence and office of the President

The President and Vice Presidents are seated at the President Office located at the Presidential Palace. The Ministry of President's Office which serve the President is located at Office No. 18, Naypyitaw. The Ministry Office is co-opened with Ministry of Union Government Office. A new Ministry Office is under construction near the Union Supreme Court. Office No. 18 is the office building of the State Peace and Development Council and the Ministry of the Prime Minister's Office during the previous SPDC government.
