= Maung Myint =

Maung Akar Tun Myint
- မောင်အာကာထွန်းမြင့်

Member of the Pyithu Hluttaw
- Incumbent
- Assumed office 31 March 2016
- Constituency: Mingin Township

Minister for Industry of Myanmar
- In office July 2013 – 30 March 2016
- Succeeded by: Khin Maung Cho

Minister for Labor of Myanmar
- In office September 2012 to – July 2013

Deputy Minister for Foreign Affairs of Myanmar
- In office March 2011 – September 2012

Personal details
- Born: 21 May 1958 (age 67) Mingin, Sagaing Region, Burma
- Party: Union Solidarity and Development Party
- Spouse: Dr. Khin Mya Win

Maung Myint (Burmese: မောင်မြင့်) or Ye Myint is a Burmese politician and incumbent Pyithu Hluttaw member of parliament for Mingin Township. He previously served as Minister for Industry of Myanmar. He was appointed to the post by President Thein Sein in July 2013 as a result of a cabinet reshuffle. Maung Myint contested the 2010 Burmese general election, winning a seat in the Pyithu Hluttaw to represent Thongwa Township constituency. He served as Deputy Minister for Foreign Affairs from March 2011 to September 2012, and as Minister for Labor from September 2012 to July 2013.

Maung Myint was born on 21 May 1958 in Mingin, Sagaing Region, Burma but grew up in Homalin, Sagaing Region. He is married to Khin Mya Win.
