= Ministry of Commerce (Myanmar) =

Government ministry of Myanmar

- စီးပွားရေးနှင့်ကူးသန်းရောင်းဝယ်ရေးဝန်ကြီးဌာန
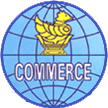

Agency overview
- Formed: 1948
- Jurisdiction: Myanmar
- Headquarters: Building 3, Nay Pyi Daw, Myanmar
- Employees: 5512
- Minister responsible: Aung Naing Oo, Union Minister
- Child agencies: Department of Trade; Department of Consumer Affairs; Myanma Trade Promotion Organization
- Website: www.commerce.gov.mm

The Ministry of Commerce (MOC) is a Burmese government ministry that plays a vital role in the transformation process of the implementation of a market-oriented economic system. Its headquarters is located at Building 3 and 52, Nay Pyi Taw, in Myanmar.

== Departmental bodies ==
- Office of the Minister
- Department of Trade
- Department of Consumer Affairs
- Department of Trade Promotion Organization

== History ==
From the time of independence in 1948 up to 1962, foreign trade was conducted by the following boards and corporations:

- Union of Burma Purchase Board
- Civil Supplies Administration Board
- Electrical Supplies Board
- State Agricultural Marketing Board
- State Timber Board
- Cooperatives
- Joint venture corporations
- Defence Service Institute
- Burma Economic Development Corporation
- Private traders

=== Establishment of Trade Council ===
In 1964, wholesale shops, broker houses, companies, department stores and warehouses all over the country were nationalised. In 1965, the Trade Council was established and the following trade organisations were set up under the Ministry of Trade:

- Central trade
- 22 trade corporations
- 14 state/divisional trade offices
- 283 township trade offices
- 1942 people's shops

In 1976, in accordance with the economic policy of the Burma Socialist Programme Party the trade organisations were reformed as follows:

- Department of Trade
- 11 trading corporations and their divisional/branch offices, factories/workshops
- 14 state/divisional trade offices

=== New establishments after 1988 ===
To be in line with the changing economic system, in 1989 the Department of Trade was changed to the Directorate of Trade with extended functions and responsibilities. In 1989–90 the following domestic and foreign joint ventures were set up and operated:

==== Domestic joint ventures ====
- Joint Venture Corporation No. 1 Ltd.
- Joint Venture Corporation No. 2 Ltd.
- Joint Venture Corporation No. 3 Ltd.
- Joint Venture Corporation No. 4 Ltd.
- Joint Venture Corporation No. 5 Ltd.
- Joint Venture Corporation No. 6 Ltd.
- Joint Venture Corporation No. 7 Ltd.
- Joint Venture Corporation No. 8 Ltd.
- Joint Venture Corporation No. 9 Ltd.
- Northern Shan State JV Co., Ltd.
- Myanmar Citizens' Bank Ltd.

==== Foreign joint ventures ====
- Myanmar Rice Engineering Co., Ltd.
- Myanmar Malaysia International Ltd.
- Myanmar Motor Ltd.
- Myanmar Singapore International Ltd.
- Myanmar Borneo Ltd.
- Myanmar Inotech Ltd.
- Myanmar Chan Ltd.
- Myanmar Tokyo Maruichi International Ltd.
- Myanmar Natsteel Hardware Ltd.
- Myanmar Inspection and Testing Services

In 1992, the Hotel and Tourism Corporation was upgraded to ministry-level and the relevant organisations, the Foodstuff and Beverages Enterprise and Hotel and Tourism Services were transferred to the Ministry of Hotel and Tourism. In 1993 the Company Registration Office, Companies Control Department and the international Organisation Sections (GATT/WTO) under the Directorate of Trade were transferred to the newly established ministry, the Ministry of National Planning and Economic Development. In 1996 the Ministry of Trade was changed to the Ministry of Commerce with a view to implement economic activities for the development of the national economy. In 1996 the Ministry of Commerce established the Department of Border Trade and it currently has 10 branch offices at the borders of neighbouring countries. In 1997 the International Organisation Section, including WTO, was retransferred from the Ministry of National Planning and Economic Development to the Ministry of Commerce.

=== Re-organisational activities under the Ministry of Commerce ===
Since 1998, six trading organisations and two service enterprises under the Ministry of Commerce have been abolished. Domestic and foreign joint ventures were also abolished except Myanmar Citizens' Bank Ltd. and Myanmar Inspection and Testing Services Ltd.

The Ministry of Commerce created a motto of Advance Forward Through Commerce and it has been conducting various activities for the development of the national economy. The Ministry of Commerce has also restructured the following departments to be in line with the adopted market-oriented economy since 1 April 1998:

- Office of the Minister
- Directorate of Trade
- Department of Border Trade
- Myanma Agricultural Produce Trading

== Department of Trade ==
There were the following departments:

- International Trade Promotion Department
- Planning & Statistics Department
- Export Department
- Import Department
- Export Import Policy and Registration Department
- Accounts Department
- Administration & Training Department

== Department of Consumer Affairs ==
Department of Consumer Affairs was established on 1 April 2016. There were the following divisions:

- Division of Administration
- Division of Accounts
- Division of Policy Review, Planning & Statistics
- Division of IT and Quality Management
- Division of Product Safety
- Division of Consumer Affairs
- State and Regional Branch offices
- District Level Offices

=== Vision ===
- To further strengthen the existing friendship between the two countries
- To promote border trade between the two countries putting it in line with normal trade
- To get the reasonable revenue for the state
- To facilitate private business activities thereby allowing them to acquire reasonable profits
- To enhance the smooth flow of commodities

=== Mission ===
- To increase the volume of trade year after year
- To get the targeted revenue fully
- To be free from corruption

=== Official border trade points ===
| Border Trade Points | Opening Date | Area |
|---|---|---|
| Muse (105) mile | 12 January 1998 | Myanmar-China |
| Lweje | 23 August 1998 | Myanmar-China |
| Chinshwehaw | 19 October 2003 | Myanmar-China |
| Laiza | 25 December 2003 | Myanmar-China |
| Techilelk | 16 March 1996 | Myanmar-Thailand |
| Myawaddy | 16 September 1998 | Myanmar-Thailand |
| Kawthoung | 1 June 1996 | Myanmar-Thailand |
| Myeik | 1 July 1999 | Myanmar-Thailand |
| Tamu | 12 April 1996 | Myanmar-India |
| Rhi | 10 December 2003 | Myanmar-India |
| Sittwe | 10 December 1998 | Myanmar-Bangladesh |
| Maungdaw | 5 September 1995 | Myanmar-Bangladesh |

=== Unofficial border trade points ===
| Border Trade Points | Area |
|---|---|
| Pansan – Menglar | Myanmar-China |
| Dawei | Myanmar-Thailand |
| Neteinhtaung | Myanmar-Thailand |
| Mawtaung | Myanmar-Thailand |
| Payathonsu (Three Pagodas) | Myanmar-Thailand |
| Paletwa (Shalatwa) – Pansung | Myanmar-India |

== Myanmar Agricultural Produce Trading ==
Myanma Agricultural Produce Trading (MAPT) is a government organisation under the Ministry of Commerce.

MAPT has laid down the following six main objectives:

- To generate more foreign exchange income for the development of the national economy
- To explore new cultivable land and organise extensive cultivation
- To assist the enhancement of better quality crop production and strive for export promotion
- To promote new exportable products
- To develop the rice milling industries
- To successfully implement the state policies with regard to agricultural produce

=== Organisation ===
The managing director is the head of MAPT. Under Myanmar Agricultural Produce Trading (MAPT), there were the following departments:

- Paddy and Rice Department
- Pulse Beans & Other Crops Department
- Milling, Engineering, Bran Oil Mail & Project Department
- Export Department
- Movement Department
- Planning & Finance Department
- Administration Department
- Inspection Department
- State/Divisional Offices, District Offices and Township Offices

Within the organisational set-up of MAPT, there are 4 functional departments as follows:

Warehousing, Handling and Export Department, Grain Department, Milling, Engineering & Bran Oil Mills Department, and the Administration Department. The Post-harvest Technology Application Centre (PTAC) under MAPT undertakes post-harvest activities, research, development and extension (RDX) works especially including food grains, fruits and vegetables and issuance of certificates relating to the quality of crops and analytical results of chemical compositions, pesticide residue, aflatoxins etc.

MAPT renders its assistance to private sectors in the following activities:

- Extends its fullest co-operations relating to exports of grains and imports of commodity from abroad
- Assists to obtain the quick result relating to various laboratory test
- Provides necessary assistance for rice milling industry and oil processing industry

=== MAPT Operations ===
MAPT assists the in following steps relating to export business that are allowed by the state to the private sector, especially grains exports, the export of new commodities, and import business:

- Undertakes the various steps of the exporting business, commencing from searching the markets for export commodities to the final negotiation stage of the shipping documents
- Renders its services to make each processing step relating to import flow smoothly
- Undertakes all necessary steps relating to the shipment of export commodities
- Carries out rental services for warehouses if necessary
- Undertakes pest control services for grain storage
- Assists necessary work to producers to become successful exporters

MAPT undertakes the following activities relating to the inspection services of exported goods and imported goods:

- Conducts preshipment inspection of commodities for export and inspection of imported commodities relating to quality/specifications, quantity, weight, measurement, packing and marking, etc.
- Issues certificates of laboratory analysis and testing
- Conducts inspection and surveying services for exporters and importers with reasonable service charges for mutual benefits
- Undertakes laboratory analysis and testing of soil and water, quality of food grains and extends technical assistance on post-harvest technology

MAPT conducts services relating to analysis and testing of soil and water:

- Undertakes analysis relating to the physical quality of food grain; milling quality; fibre content; contents of dust, husk, sand and other admixture; contents of discoloured grains, etc.
- Undertakes analysis and testing of the qualities of food grain such as moisture content; composition of ash, protein, starch/carbohydrate; fibre and other chemical composition, etc.
- Undertakes analysis and testing for aflatoxin contamination
- Undertakes analysis and testing of quality of oil and oil crops, colour condition, specific gravity, oil colour test, cloud point, moisture content, fat, acidity, etc.
- Extends technical assistance on pest control services

MAPT undertakes the following services relating to the milling of rice, and construction and maintenance of rice mills:

- Follows rice milling activities for effective improvement in quality with reasonable affordable charges.
- Milling paddy to white rice
- Milling brown rice to white rice
- Remilling of rice
- Recleaning of rice and broken rice
- Milling paddy to brown rice
- Assists private entrepreneurs who wish to construct new rice mills, improving development of existing rice mills and maintenance of existing rice mills
- Manufactures and sells mobile and low-cost small rice mills
- Assists private sector with rice milling technology

MAPT undertakes the following services relating to edible rice bran oil mills:

- Conducts nrocorry of edible rice bran oil with reasonable charges.
- Removes the colour and odour from various types of edible oil and ensures purity of oil.
- Extracts oil from soyabeans, purifies raw palm oil and extracts oil from expelled cakes (groundnut cake, sesame cake) by using the chemical solvent extraction method.

MAPT undertakes the following machinery installation services to upgrade the quality of food grains:

- Cleans paddy machines and beans
- Dries paddy machines and other grains

MAPT also renders the following engineering services:

- Converts cars with diesel and petrol engines as well as LPG cars to the CNG system
- Conducts design services for modern and concentrated warehouse designs
- Conducts consultancy services relating to the drawing of building designs and estimating construction costs for rice mills and bran oil mills

== Ministers of Commerce ==
- U Kyaw Myint (1948–1949)
- U Kyaw Myint (1950–1952)
- U Rashid (1954-1956, 1960–1962)
- Brigade General Aung Gyi (1962–1963)
- Colonel Chit Myaing (1963–1964)
- Brigade General Tin Pe (1964–1971)
- Colonel Maung Lwin (1971–1974)
- U San Win (1974–1976)
- U Hla Aye (1976–1978)
- U Ye Daung (1978–1978)
- U Khin Maung Gyi (1978–1988)
- Colonel David Abel (1988–1992)
- General Tun Kyi (1992–1997)
- General Kyaw Than (1997–1999)
- Brigade General Pyaih Sone (1999–2004)
- Brigade General Tin Naing Thein (2004–2011)
- Win Myint (2011–2016)
- Than Myint (2016–2021)
- Pwint San (2021– 19 August 2022)
- Aung Naing Oo (19 August 2022 - Incumbent)
