= Ohn Win =

His Excellency Ohn Win
- အုန်းဝင်း

Minister of Natural Resources and Environmental Conservation of Myanmar
- Incumbent
- Assumed office 30 March 2016
- President: Htin Kyaw; Win Myint
- Preceded by: Win Tun; Myint Aung

Pro-Rector of the University of Forestry, Yezin
- In office ?–2011

Personal details
- Born: November 11, 1951 (age 74) Kyetsha village, Ngapudaw Township, Burma
- Education: B.Sc (Forestry); M.Sc (Watershed Management)
- Alma mater: Yangon Arts and Science University; Colorado State University

Ohn Win (Burmese: အုန်းဝင်း; born 11 November 1951) is a Burmese forester and incumbent Minister for the Ministry of Natural Resources and Environmental Conservation (Myanmar). Prior to his appointment as the Minister, he served in the Forest Department in various capacities. He was also a professor, and later pro-rector, at the University of Forestry (Yezin).

== Early life and education ==
Ohn Win was born on 11 November 1951 to Sein Htun and Tin Myint in Kyetsha village, located on Pyinkhayaing Island in Ngapudaw Township, Burma (now Myanmar).

Ohn Win graduated from the Yangon Arts and Science University (Yangon University) in 1976 with a Bachelor of Science (B.Sc.) degree in forestry. He also studied at the University of the Philippines Los Baños and obtained his master's degree from the Colorado State University in the United States

== Career ==
He had held highest-level appointed administrative post Pro-Rector at the University of Forestry (UoF) in Yezin until 2011. Prior to this, he served subsequently in several high level positions as Director of the Planning and Statistic Department at the Ministry of Forestry, Director of the Forest Research Institute (FRI) in Yezin, and Director the Shan State Forest Department and Mon State Forest Department. Following the military coup in Myanmar on 1 February 2021, U Ohn Win was arrested and later charged by the military junta under section 55 of the anti-corruption law.

== Personal life ==
Ohn Win is married to San San Htay, and has three children, Mala Win (also known as Mala Nwe), Nila Win, and Thanda Win.
