= Khin Maung Cho =

Burmese politician

His Excellency Khin Maung Cho
- ခင်မောင်ချို
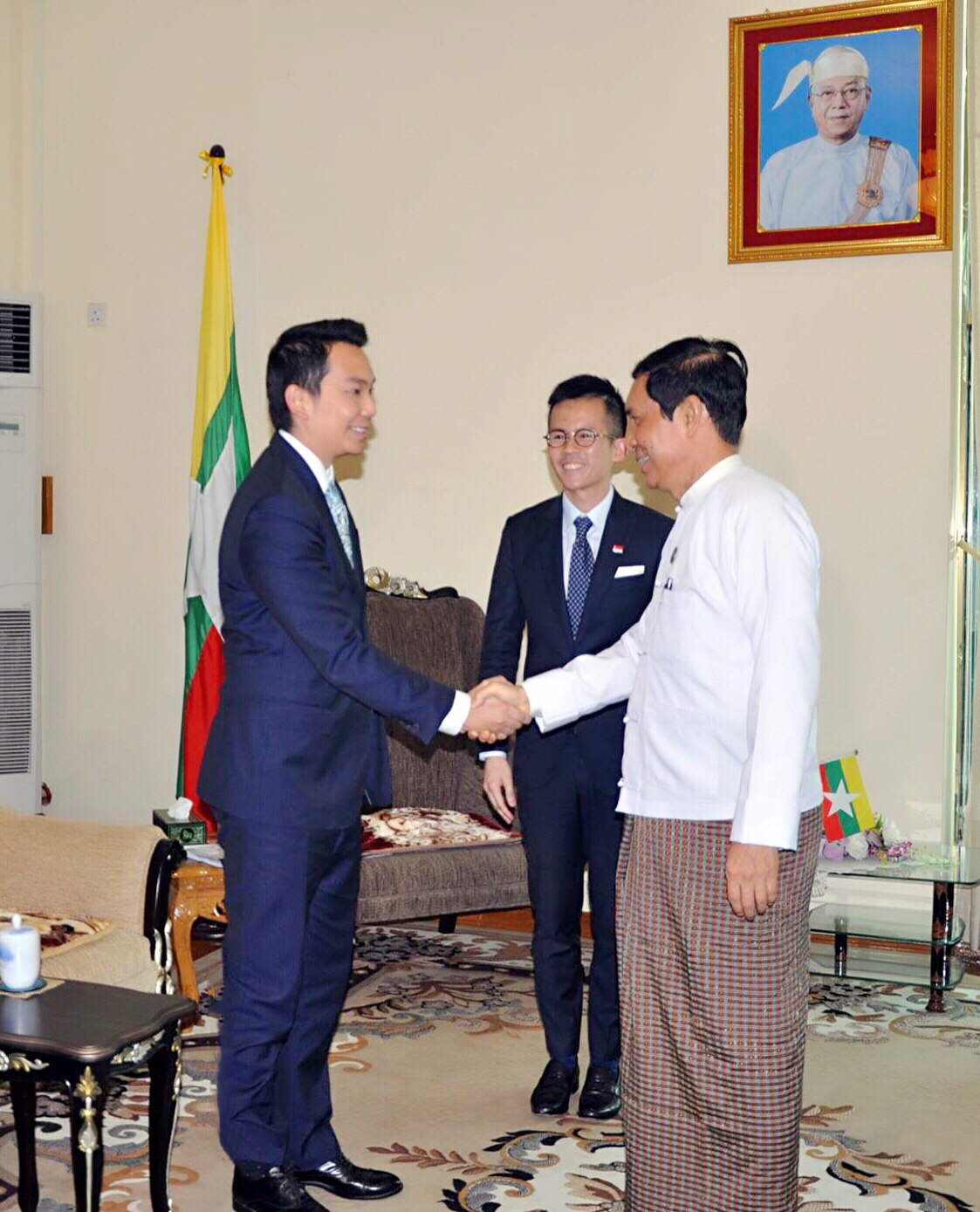
- Khin Maung Cho (on the right) meeting with a foreign delegate in 2017

Minister for Industry of Myanmar
- In office 30 March 2016 – 26 July 2019
- President: Htin Kyaw; Myint Swe (acting); Win Myint
- Preceded by: Maung Myint
- Succeeded by: Soe Win

Personal details
- Born: 3 November 1950 (age 75) Meikhtila, Burma (Myanmar)
- Education: Yangon Technological University
- Occupation: Engineer

Khin Maung Cho (Burmese: ခင်မောင်ချို [kʰɪ̀ɴ màʊɴ tɕʰò]; born 3 November 1950) is the Burmese politician and a former Minister for Industry of Myanmar (Burma).

== Early life and education ==
Khin Maung Cho was born on 3 November 1950 to Ba Cho, a retired communications engineer, and Ma Ma Gyi, a retired school teacher, in Meiktila, Burma (now Myanmar).

== Career ==
On 22 March 2016, he was nominated to be Minister for Industry in President Htin Kyaw's Cabinet. On 24 March, the Assembly of the Union confirmed his nomination.

He previously served as an executive engineer at Super Seven Stars Company (SSS), the authorised distributor of Kia Motors. From 2013 to 2015, it is alleged that SSS has dodged billions of kyats in tax.

== Personal life ==
Khin Maung Cho is married to Thit Thit Aung, the head of the branch directorate of industrial cooperation within the Ministry of Industry, and has no children.
