= Khin Maung Soe =

- ခင်မောင်စိုး
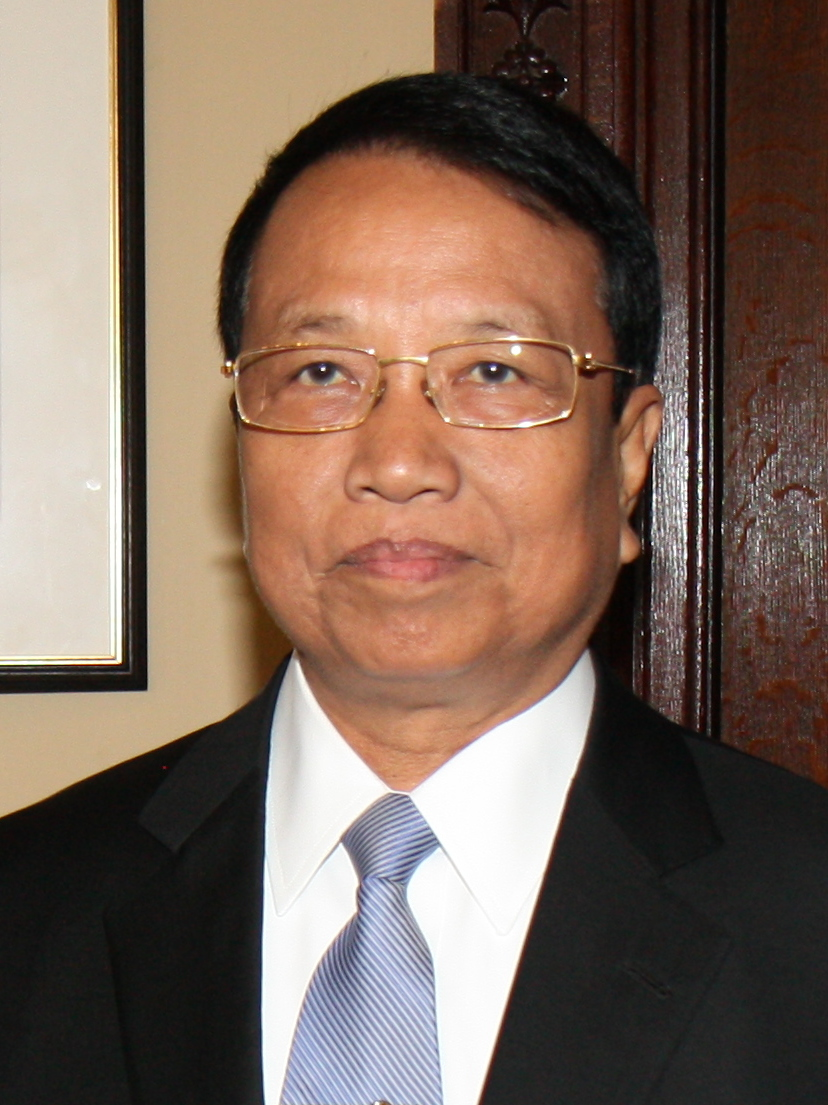
- Khin Maung Soe in 2014

Minister of Electric Power
- In office February 2011 – 30 March 2016
- Succeeded by: Thein Sein

Chairman of the Yangon City Electric Power Supply Board
- In office ?–?

Personal details
- Party: Union Solidarity and Development Party
- Education: Officers Training School, Bahtoo
- Nickname: Khin Maung Soe

Military service
- Branch/service: Army

Khin Maung Soe (Burmese: ခင်မောင်စိုး) was the Minister for Electric Power from 2011 to 2016. He was appointed in February 2011 by President Thein Sein. He was previously Chairman of the Rangoon City Electric Power Supply Board.
