= Myint Hlaing =

- မြင့်လှိုင်

Minister for Agriculture and Irrigation
- In office 30 March 2011 – 30 March 2016

Pyithu Hluttaw MP
- In office 31 January 2011 – 30 March 2011
- Preceded by: Constituency established
- Succeeded by: Naingngan Lin (NLD)
- Constituency: Dekkhinathiri Township
- Majority: 13,398 (90.14%)

Chief of Air Defence Forces
- In office May 2006 – August 2010

Personal details
- Born: 13 August 1953 (age 72) Mogok, Burma
- Party: Union Solidarity and Development Party

Military service
- Allegiance: Burma
- Branch/service: Myanmar Army
- Years of service: 1970–2010
- Rank: Lieutenant General

Myint Hlaing (Burmese: မြင့်လှိုင်; born 13 August 1953) was the Minister for Agriculture and Irrigation of Myanmar (Burma) from 2011 to 2016. He is a retired lieutenant general in the Myanmar Army and Chief of the Air Defence Forces from May 2006 to August 2010. He also served as Commander of Northeast Regional Command based in Lashio, Shan State.

== Early life and education ==
Myint Hlaing was born on 13 August 1953 in Mogok, Mandalay Division. He graduated from the 17th intake of the Defence Services Academy in 1975. He is a close associate of former SPDC Vice Senior General Maung Aye, having served under him in the Tatmadaw’s Eastern Command during the late 1980s. In 1995, Myint Hlaing attended military training in Nanjing, China.

== Political career and arrest ==
Myint Hlaing served as the chairman of the Naypyidaw chapter of the Union Solidarity and Development Party until 2022. On April 10, 2024, Myint Hlaing was arrested following a military raid at his home.
