= Paw Khin =

Burmese politician

- ပေါ်ခင်

2nd Pyithu Hluttaw
- In office 2 May 2012 – 29 January 2016
- Preceded by: Nyan Tun Aung
- Succeeded by: Naing Htoo Aung
- Constituency: Natogyi Township

Member-elect of the Pyithu Hluttaw
- Preceded by: Constituency established
- Succeeded by: Constituency abolished
- Constituency: Myingyan № 1
- Majority: 42,015 (70%)

Personal details
- Born: 12 February 1947 (age 79) Gawnkwe, Myingyan District, Burma
- Party: National League for Democracy
- Relations: Htwe (father); Thet Myaing (mother)
- Education: Rangoon Institute of Technology
- Occupation: Politician and trader

Paw Khin (Burmese: ပေါ်ခင်) is a Burmese politician, previously served as a Pyithu Hluttaw member of parliament for Natogyi Township. In the 1990 Burmese general election, he was elected as an Pyithu Hluttaw MP, winning a majority of 42,015 (70% of the votes), but was never allowed to assume his seat.

Paw Khin was educated at Maymyo's St. Elvert High School and Myingyan State High School before matriculating from the Rangoon Institute of Technology (now Yangon Technological University) in 1975.
