= Tun Kyi =

Burmese military officer

10th Minister for Commerce of the Union of Myanmar
- In office 1992–1997
- Preceded by: Colonel David Abel
- Succeeded by: General Kyaw Than

Personal details
- Born: May 1, 1938 (age 88) Monywa, Sagaing Division, Myanmar
- Party: SPDC
- Education: Defence Services Academy
- Occupation: Army Officer

Lieutenant-General Tun Kyi (Burmese: ထွန်းကြည်; born May 1, 1938, in Monywa) is an officer of the Burmese military and a former minister of the Ministry of Commerce.

== Biography ==
Tun Kyi attended the Basic Education High School in Monywa. He graduated from the Defence Services Academy as part of its first intake. Tun Kyi was named commander in 1988 in Mandalay. He was promoted as the minister of Ministry of Commerce at September 24, 1992. Lt-General Tun Kyi was the member of the State Law and Order Restoration Council and was Chairman of the Committee for Boosting Meat and Fish Production and Controlling Consumer Prices, and Committee for Boosting Marine Production.
