= Than Myint =

Burmese politician

His Excellency Than Myint
- သန်းမြင့်
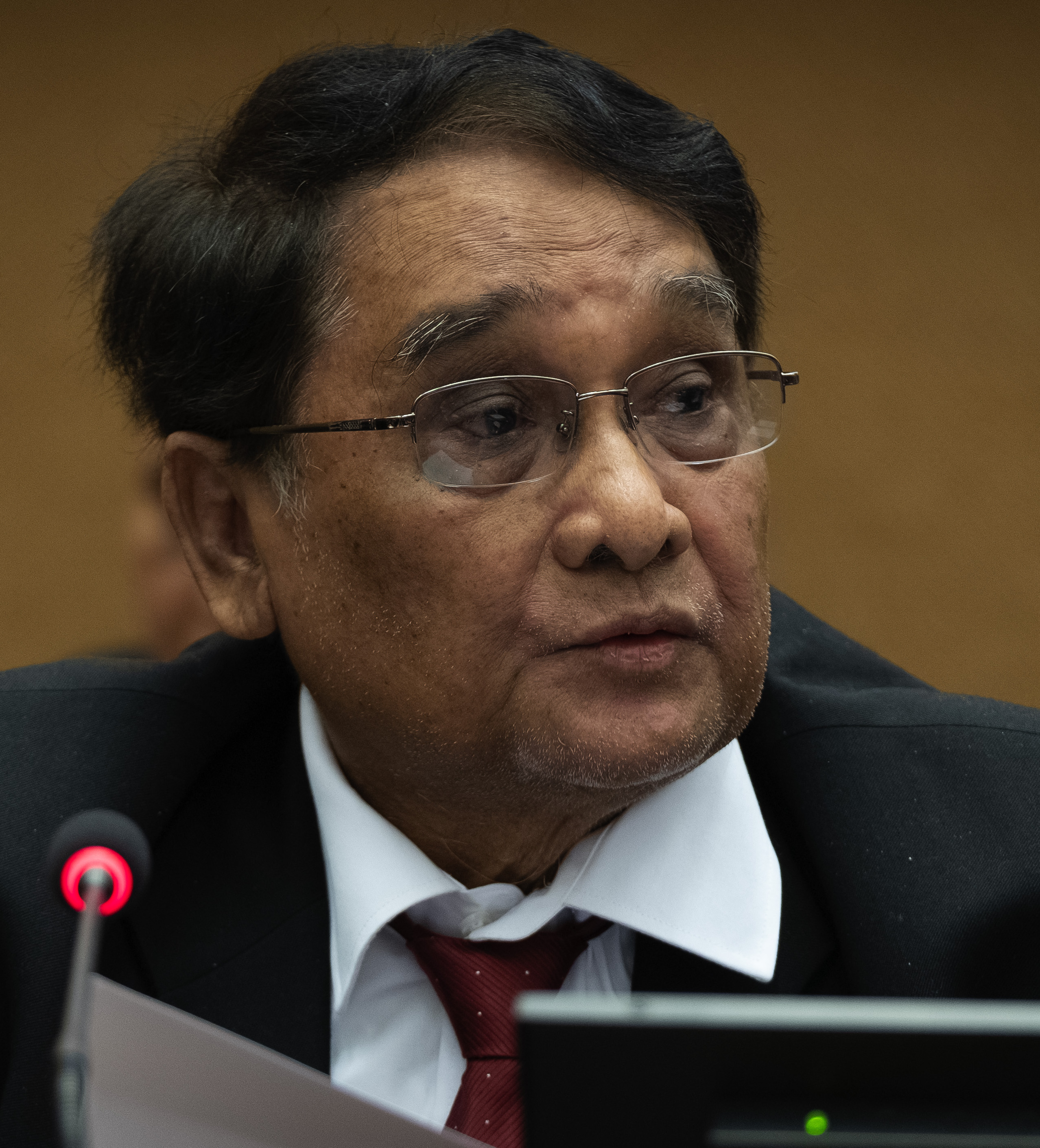
- Than Myint in 2020

Minister for Commerce
- In office 30 March 2016 – 1 February 2021
- President: Htin Kyaw; Myint Swe (acting); Win Myint
- Preceded by: Win Myint
- Succeeded by: Pwint San

Member of the House of Representatives
- In office 1 February 2016 – 30 March 2016
- Constituency: Hlaingthaya

Personal details
- Born: January 17, 1943 (age 83) Ingapu Township, British Burma (now Myanmar)
- Party: National League for Democracy (NLD)
- Spouse: Khin Htay
- Education: Yangon Institute of Economics

Than Myint (Burmese: သန်းမြင့် [θáɴ mjɪ̰ɴ]; born 17 January 1943) is a Burmese politician and former Minister for Commerce of Myanmar (Burma).

== Early life and education ==
Than Myint was born on 17 January 1943 to Tin Maung and Daw San in the village of Sitkyun, Ingapu Township, Burma (now Myanmar).

== Career ==
He previously served as a National League for Democracy (NLD) Member of the House of Representatives for the constituency of Hlaingthaya.

In 2016 he was nominated as Minister of Commerce in Htin Kyaw's inaugural Cabinet, whereupon his academic credentials came under scrutiny and he was revealed to have listed a PhD on his CV from Pacific Western University (California), a now defunct institution which was not accredited, and had been found by a US congressional investigation to be a diploma mill which issued degrees without requiring students to meet stringent criteria of academic merit.

During the 2021 Myanmar coup d'état on 1 February, Than Myint was placed under house arrest by the Myanmar Armed Forces.

== Personal life ==
Than Myint is married to Thin Htay, a retired development bureaucrat and has no children.
