= Soe Maung =

- စိုးမောင်

Minister of the President’s Office
- In office 30 March 2011 – 30 March 2016 Serving with Thein Nyunt, Soe Thein, Aung Min, Hla Tun and Tin Naing Thein
- Succeeded by: Aung San Suu Kyi

Pyithu Hluttaw MP
- In office 31 January 2011 – 30 March 2011
- Preceded by: Constituency established
- Succeeded by: Tin Htay Aung (NLD)
- Constituency: Yesagyo Township
- Majority: 101,146 (76.72%)

Judge Advocate General

Personal details
- Born: 20 December 1952 (age 73) Yesagyo, Magway Division, Burma
- Party: Union Solidarity and Development Party
- Spouse: Nang Phyu Phyu Aye
- Children: Zaw Win Shein
- Education: Defence Services Academy

Military service
- Allegiance: Myanmar
- Branch/service: Myanmar Army
- Years of service: –2011
- Rank: Major-General

Soe Maung (Burmese: စိုးမောင်) is a Burmese politician and retired army general. He served as a Minister of the President's Office in Thein Sein's Cabinet along with five other ministers. He is a retired Major General in the Myanmar Army and a former Judge Advocate General. He is a graduate of the Defence Services Academy.

In August 2018, Soe Maung registered a new political party, Democratic Party of National Politics (DNP), in the leadup to the 2020 Myanmar general election, along with another former military officer and Auditor-General, Lun Maung. DNP attracted attention ahead of the election for announcing it would only select candidates who pay a 300,000-kyat ($220) fee to cover their campaign expenses. DNP has faced allegations of being a proxy party for the military-operated Union Solidarity and Development Party because of Soe Maung's close ties to Than Shwe. Soe Maung is also a chair of Ra Hta Pa La Association (ရဋ္ဌပါလအသင်း; from Pali: Raṭṭhapāla, lit. 'country's protectors'), a nationalist organization.

== Personal life ==
Soe Maung is married to Nang Phyu Phyu Aye. His adopted son, Zaw Win Shein, is a businessman who established Ayeyar Hinthar Holdings in 2006.
