= Thein Htay =

Burmese politician

- သိန်းဌေး
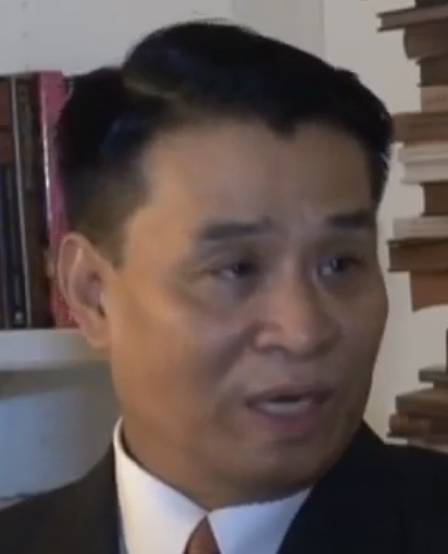
- Thein Htay in 2012

Minister of Border Affairs of Myanmar
- In office 30 March 2011 – 13 February 2013
- Succeeded by: Lt Gen Thet Naing Win

Minister of Industrial Development of Myanmar
- In office 30 March 2011 – 5 September 2012
- Preceded by: position established
- Succeeded by: position abolished

Deputy Minister of Defense
- In office ?–?

Personal details
- Born: 7 September 1955 (age 70) Taunggyi, Shan State, Burma
- Party: Union Solidarity and Development Party
- Spouse: Myint Myint Khaing

Military service
- Allegiance: Myanmar
- Branch/service: Myanmar Army
- Rank: Lieutenant General

Thein Htay (Burmese: သိန်းဌေး) was the former Minister for Border Affairs and Minister for Industrial Development of Myanmar (Burma). He was reassigned to the Myanmar Army in February 2013, as the head of the Directorate of Defense Industries (DDI) carrying the rank of lieutenant general.
