= Hsan Sint =

Burmese politician

- ဆန်းဆင့်

Minister of Religious Affairs
- In office 31 January 2013 – 19 June 2014
- Preceded by: Myint Maung
- Succeeded by: Soe Win

Speaker of the Ayeyarwady Region Hluttaw
- In office 31 January 2011 – 31 January 2013
- Preceded by: None
- Succeeded by: Tin Soe

Member of the Ayeyarwady Region Hluttaw
- In office 31 January 2011 – 31 January 2013
- Preceded by: Constituency established
- Constituency: Yegyi Township

Personal details
- Born: 1951 (age 74–75) Burma
- Party: Union Solidarity and Development Party
- Spouse: Khin Ma Lay
- Children: Okkar San Sint
- Education: Defence Services Academy

Military service
- Allegiance: Myanmar
- Branch/service: Myanmar Army
- Years of service: -2010
- Rank: Major-General

Hsan Sint (Burmese: ဆန်းဆင့်, also spelt San Sint) is a Burmese politician and former government minister and army general. He was appointed as Minister of Religious Affairs by President Thein Sein in January 2013. At the time, he was the speaker for the Ayeyarwady Region Hluttaw who concurrently serves as one of two Hluttaw members representing Yegyi Township.

Before retiring to contest the 2010 Burmese general election, Hsan Sint served in the Myanmar Army. He previously held posts as a Military Appointment General and deputy commander of the Yangon Command.

== Corruption scandal ==
Hsan Sint was dismissed as Minister of Religious Affairs on 19 June 2014, for his alleged poor handling of the Mahasantisukha Monastery raid in Yangon, and disagreements with other members of the government. That same day, he was charged with corruption, for allegedly mishandling US$10,000 in state funds to be used toward the construction of a pagoda in Lewe Township. On 25 June 2014, the Pyidaungsu Hluttaw confirmed a replacement, Soe Win, who was previously deputy minister, to post of Minister of Religious Affairs.

The Dekkhinathiri District Court rejected his plea bail in July 2014. On 22 July 2014, Hsan Sint was also charged with sedition. On 17 October 2014, the court sentenced him to 13 years, with a 100,000 kyat fine. On 6 April 2015, the Supreme Court of Burma announced it would accept his appeal.

In 2012, he supported a motion to sack Ayeyarwady Region government and accused Union Solidarity and Development Party vice chairperson Htay Oo of interfering in the dispute. He was warned in 2014 before his corruption scandal for his comments on the need to eliminate corruption among government and parliamentary officials. There are some suggestions that he was a scapegoat for criticism of the government’s role in the Mahasantisukha Buddha Sasana Center raid.

Hsan Sint was released on 24 May 2017, as part of a presidential amnesty for political activists.

== Personal life ==
Hsan Sint was born in 1951. He is married to Khin Ma Lay, and has a son, Okkar San Sint, who allegedly owned Thandaw Sint newspaper.
