= Win Myint (politician, born 1954) =

Burmese politician and businessman

Wunna Kyawhtin Win Myint
- ဝင်းမြင့်

Minister for Commerce of Myanmar
- In office 30 March 2011 – 30 March 2016
- Succeeded by: Than Myint

MP of the Amyotha Hluttaw
- In office 31 January 2011 – 30 March 2011
- Preceded by: Constituency established
- Succeeded by: Myint Naing (NLD)
- Constituency: Kantbalu, Kyunhla, Ye U, Taze Townships
- Majority: 212,718 (76.34%)

President of the Union of Myanmar Federation of Chambers of Commerce and Industry
- Succeeded by: Win Aung

Personal details
- Born: 21 April 1954 (age 71) Ye-U, Sagaing Division, Burma
- Party: Union Solidarity and Development Party
- Relations: Lay Myint (brother); Htay Myint (brother); Kyin Toe (brother); Pu Kyi (brother)
- Occupation: Politician, businessman

Wunna Kyawhtin Win Myint (Burmese: ဝင်းမြင့်) is a Burmese politician, businessman and former Minister for Commerce of Myanmar. He is also owner of the Shwe Nagar Min Company, Zeyashwemye Football Club and former chairman of the Union of Myanmar Federation of Chambers of Commerce and Industry (UMFCCI).
