= Mahasantisukha Buddha Sasana Center =

Buddhist monastery in Yangon, Myanmar

Mahāsantisukha Buddha Sasana Center
- မဟာသန္တိသုခ ဗုဒ္ဓသာသနာပြုကျောင်းတော်ကြီး
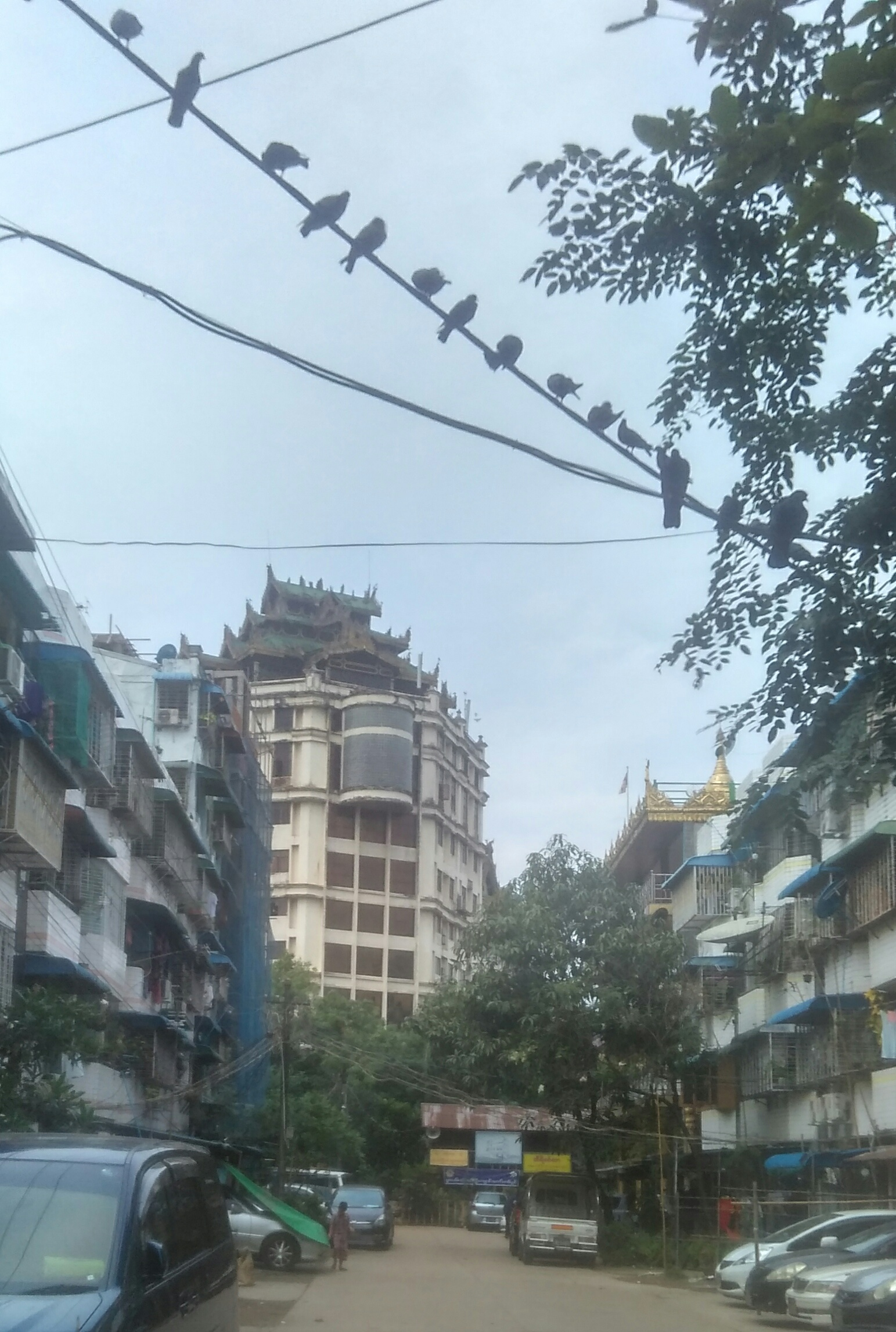
- Back View of Mahāsantisukha Buddha Sasana Center

- Location within Myanmar

Religion
- Affiliation: Theravada Buddhism

Location
- Country: Tamwe Township, Yangon, Yangon Region, Burma
- Interactive map of Mahāsantisukha Buddha Sasana Center
- Coordinates: 16.810952°N 96.180405°E

Architecture
- Founder: Pannavamsa
- Completed: December 17, 1999; 26 years ago

Mahāsantisukha Buddha Sasana Center (Burmese: မဟာသန္တိသုခ ဗုဒ္ဓသာသနာပြုကျောင်းတော်ကြီး) is a Theravada Buddhist monastery located in Natchaung Ward, Tamwe Township, Yangon, Myanmar. The monastery was inaugurated on 17 December 1999, and was spearheaded under the leadership of Pannavamsa, and was sponsored with the support of the Burmese government.

== Ownership dispute ==
Between 2002 and 2004, the government, under Khin Nyunt's guidance, confiscated the monastery and handed it to the State Sangha Maha Nayaka Committee, a government body that oversees Burma's monastic population. In March 2014, Pannavamsa wrote to President Thein Sein to resolve the ownership conflict.

== Monastery raid ==
On 10 June 2014, 300 police and 280 Yangon Region Sangha Maha Nayaka Committee members and Ministry of Religious Affairs officials raided the monastery at 11 pm, evicting 20 monks and 32 laypersons from the site. The raid was heavily criticized for its heavy handedness, and was conducted while Pannavamsa, the monastery's founder, was away in Japan on a missionary trip. Monks in the monastery had been instructed on May 18 to leave by the end of the month, following the March 6 decision of the 47-member State Sangha Maha Nayaka Committee.

Several monks were detained after the raid. 5 Buddhist monks, namely Uttara, Pannacara, Sendara, Nandiya and Tejinda, were disrobed, arrested and charged with disobeying Buddhist clergy rules and defaming religion under section 295(a) of the Myanmar Penal Code and 20/90 of the 1990 Law Relating to the Sangha Organizations. One of the arrested monks, Uttara, is a British citizen.

Religious affairs minister Hsan Sint was dismissed by Thein Sein on 19 June 2014 over his handling of the monastery raid and defiance of the president's orders.

The dispute ended on 13/14 December 2015. A district court judged the charge invalid.
