= Soe Thein =

Burmese politician

- စိုးသိန်း
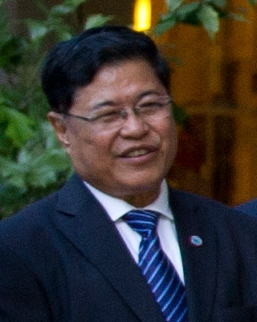
- Soe Thein in 2012

Minister of the President's Office of Myanmar
- In office 27 August 2012 – 30 March 2016 Serving with Thein Nyunt, Soe Maung, Aung Min, Hla Tun and Tin Naing Thein
- Preceded by: Position established

Minister for Industry 2 of Myanmar
- In office June 2008 – 27 August 2012

Pyithu Hluttaw MP
- In office 31 January 2011 – 30 March 2011
- Preceded by: Constituency established
- Succeeded by: Tin Tin Yi (NLD)
- Constituency: Kyunsu Township
- Majority: Ran unopposed

Amyotha Hluttaw MP
- In office 1 February 2016 – 1 February 2021
- Constituency: Kayah State № 9

Commander-in-Chief of the Myanmar Navy
- In office 2 January 2004 – 20 June 2008

Personal details
- Born: 7 September 1949 (age 76) Rangoon, Burma
- Party: Union Solidarity and Development Party (2010-2015) Independent
- Spouse: Khin Aye Kyin
- Children: Aye Chan; Yimon Aye; Thida Aye

Military service
- Allegiance: Myanmar
- Branch/service: Myanmar Navy
- Years of service: –2010
- Rank: Vice-Admiral

Soe Thein (Burmese: စိုးသိန်း; born 7 September 1949 in Rangoon, Burma), also spelt Soe Thane, is a Burmese politician who served as Minister of the President's Office of Myanmar (Burma) between 2011 and 2016 and as Minister of Industry 2 in 2010-2012. He is a retired Vice Admiral and previously served as the Commander in Chief of the Myanmar Navy. He also served as the Chairman of the Myanmar Investment Commission from 2010 to 2013.

Soe Thein has been accused of buying votes in Bawlakhe twice, in 2015 and in 2020. He won that constituency both times.

== Personal life ==
Soe Thein is married to Khin Aye Kyin, also called Aye Aye. They have one son, Aye Chan (b. 1973), and 2 daughters, Yimon Aye (b. 1980) and Thida Aye (b. 1979). Thida Aye is a director at the Singaporean investment firm Dymon Asia, while Aye Chan is an Executive Director of an e-commerce site called RGO47. Yimon Aye is a professor of chemistry & chemical biology at University of Oxford.

== Professional life ==
Soe Thein while serving in Myanmar's Navy had a formative experience working in Denmark where his exposure to the West would foster a positive view of reform. In the Thein Sein Presidency, Soe Thein was a significant reform advocate. Due to Soe Theins work as a western oriented ally of President Thein Sein, Soe Thein gained a reputation as one of the more forward thinking figures of transition era Myanmar according to Thant Myint-U. Soe Thein along with other Thein Sein era officials, such as negotiator Aung Min, would seek a seat in the Pyithu Hluttaw. Soe Thein would be successful in his election bid and witness the rise of Aung San Suu Kyi while some officials such as Aung Min would fail to secure a position in the nations legislature.
