= Kyaw Swa Khaing =

- ကျော်စွာခိုင်

Minister of the President’s Office
- In office 10 August 2011 – 2012

MP of the Pyithu Hluttaw
- In office 31 January 2011 – 30 March 2011
- Preceded by: Constituency established
- Succeeded by: Min Thu (NLD)
- Constituency: Ottarathiri Township
- Majority: 26,885 (79.97%)

Deputy Minister of Industry-2 of Myanmar
- In office 24 October 2007 – ?

Personal details
- Born: February 28, 1948 Rangoon, Burma
- Died: May 16, 2013 (aged 65) Yangon, Myanmar
- Party: Union Solidarity and Development Party
- Spouse: Khin Phyu Mar

Military service
- Allegiance: Myanmar
- Branch/service: Myanmar Army
- Years of service: –2011
- Rank: Major General

Kyaw Swa Khaing (Burmese: ကျော်စွာခိုင်, variously spelt Kyaw Swar Khaing, Kyaw Swar Khine) was the Minister of the President's Office of Myanmar (Burma) and a former Deputy Minister for Industry-2.

He held the rank of Major General before resigning his military post to compete in the 2010 Burmese general election.
