= Kyaw Lwin =

Former Construction Minister of Myanmar

- ကျော်လွင်

Minister of Construction
- In office September 2012 – 30 March 2016
- Preceded by: Khin Maung Myint
- Succeeded by: Win Khaing

Deputy Minister of Construction
- In office March 2011 – September 2012

Kyaw Lwin (Burmese: ကျော်လွင်) is the former Minister of Construction for Myanmar. He was appointed by President Thein Sein in September 2012. He previously served as deputy minister within the Construction Ministry from March 2011 to September 2012.
