= Thein Nyunt =

Burmese politician and army colonel (1948–2024)

- သိန်းညွန့်

Minister of the President’s Office of Burma
- In office 30 March 2011 – 30 March 2016 Serving with Soe Maung, Soe Thein, Aung Min, Hla Tun and Tin Naing Thein
- Preceded by: Office established
- Succeeded by: Aung San Suu Kyi

Chairman of Naypyidaw Council
- In office 30 March 2011 – 30 March 2016
- Preceded by: office established
- Succeeded by: Myo Aung

Mayor of Naypyidaw
- In office 1 March 2006 – 30 March 2011
- Preceded by: office established
- Succeeded by: Myo Aung

Minister of Progress of Border Areas, National Races and Development Affairs
- In office 15 November 1997 – 30 March 2011

Personal details
- Born: 8 October 1948 Maubin, Burma
- Died: 17 March 2024 (aged 75)
- Party: Union Solidarity and Development Party
- Spouse: Kyin Khaing

Military service
- Allegiance: Burma
- Branch/service: Burmese Army
- Rank: Colonel

Thein Nyunt (Burmese: သိန်းညွန့်; 8 October 1948 – 17 March 2024) was a Burmese politician and army colonel who was one of six ministers of the President's Office, in the Cabinet of Burma (Myanmar), as well as the Mayor and the Chairman of the Naypyidaw Council, which governs the national capital. He served for State Peace and Development Council as the Minister of Progress of Border Areas, National Races and Development Affairs. Thein Nyunt was appointed interim mayor of Naypyidaw, the national capital of Myanmar on 1 March 2006 and subsequently became the Chairman of the Naypyidaw Council. He was an army colonel. Thein Nyunt died from brain cancer on 17 March 2024, at the age of 75.
