= Thet Naing Win =

- သက်နိုင်ဝင်း

Minister of Border Affairs
- In office February 2013 – 13 August 2015
- Preceded by: Thein Htay
- Succeeded by: Kyaw Swe

General Secretary of the Union Solidarity and Development Party
- Incumbent
- Assumed office 23 August 2016
- Preceded by: Tin Naing Thein

Personal details
- Born: 22 July 1955 (age 70) Maubin, Irrawaddy Division, Burma
- Party: Union Solidarity and Development Party

Military service
- Allegiance: Burma
- Branch/service: Myanmar Army
- Rank: Lieutenant General

Lieutenant General Thet Naing Win (Burmese: သက်နိုင်ဝင်း) is a Lieutenant General in the Myanmar Army. He was the Minister of Border Affairs, having been appointed by Thein Sein in February 2013, to replace Thein Htay, who returned to the Ministry of Defence.

== Early life ==
Thet Naing Win was born on 22 July 1955 in Maubin, Irrawaddy Division, Burma. After obtaining a Bachelor of Science degree in chemistry from the University of Mawlamyine, he joined and attended OTS intake 56. He later earned a Master of Arts degree in defence too.

== Career ==
Thet Naing Win served as the chief of the Defense Ministry's Bureau of Special Operations from 2010 to 2013. Before that, he was commander of the Southeastern Regional Command (Mon State) in the 2000s. Thet Naing Win on August 23 was elected General Secretary of the Union Solidarity and Development Party, preceded by Tin Naing Thein, former Minister of the President's Office of Myanmar and retired brigadier general. replacing former president Thein Sein.
