= Myint Aung (minister) =

- မြင့်အောင်

Minister of Mines
- In office September 2012 – 30 March 2016
- Deputy: Than Tun Aung
- Preceded by: Thein Htaik

Myint Aung (Burmese: မြင့်အောင်) was the Burmese Minister of Mines from 2012 to 2016. He was appointed in September 2012 by President Thein Sein, replacing Thein Htaik, who became the Union Auditor General. He is a former Civil Service Board member.
