= Burma Economic Development Corporation =

Former Burmese economic enterprise

Corporation overview
- Formed: May 1961
- Preceding corporation: Defence Services Institute
- Dissolved: 20 October 1963
- Jurisdiction: Burma
- Headquarters: Rangoon

The Burma Economic Development Corporation (BEDC), formerly the Defence Services Institute (DSI), was Burma's largest economic enterprise in the late 1950s. A state-run enterprise, it was established in May 1961, under the 1961 Burma Economic Development Corporation Act with the resumption of civilian rule, although it remained under military control. BEDC was nationalized on 20 October 1963, as part of the implementation of the Burmese Way to Socialism. At the time of nationalization, BEDC consisted of 42 separate firms, including Burma Beverage Co., Mandalay Brewery and Distillery, along with various chemical and paint, pharmaceutical, polyproducts, canning, shoes, garment manufacturers, book stores, housing and construction companies, fisheries, hardwood trading, hotel operators, and coal suppliers.
