= Aung Min =

Burmese politician

- အောင်မင်း
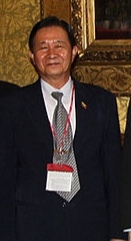
- Aung Min in 2013

Minister of the President's Office of Myanmar
- In office 27 August 2012 – 30 March 2016 Serving with Thein Nyunt, Soe Maung, Soe Thein, Hla Tun and Tin Naing Thein
- Preceded by: Position established
- Succeeded by: Aung San Suu Kyi

Minister of Rail Transportation of Myanmar
- In office 1 February 2003 – 27 August 2012
- Preceded by: Win Sein
- Succeeded by: Zeya Aung

Pyithu Hluttaw MP
- In office 31 January 2011 – 30 March 2011
- Preceded by: Constituency established
- Succeeded by: Aung Soe Myint (NLD)
- Constituency: Taungoo Township
- Majority: 85,932 (70.76%)

Deputy Minister for Defence of Myanmar
- In office ?–?

Personal details
- Born: 20 November 1949 (age 76) Burma
- Party: Union Solidarity and Development Party
- Spouse: Wai Wai Tha
- Children: Aye Mya Aung; Htoo Char Aung

Military service
- Allegiance: Myanmar
- Branch/service: Myanmar Army
- Years of service: –2010
- Rank: Major-General

Aung Min (Burmese: အောင်မင်း) is a former Minister of the President's Office of Myanmar (Burma), chairperson of Myanmar Peace Centre and a former Minister for Rail Transportation of Myanmar (Burma). He is also a retired Major General in the Myanmar Army.

Aung Min's daughter, Aye Mya Aung, is married to Burmese rapper and pop singer, Ye Lay. His son, Htoo Char Aung, is a hotelier and USDP politician.

== Professional life ==
Aung Min served as a key negotiator during the Thein Sein administration. He worked primarily on engaging armed ethnic groups for the purposes of promoting the internal security of Myanmar.

Aung Min would loose prominence with the rise of Aung San Suu Kyi. He would along with other Thein Sein administration officials run for a seat in the nations legislature. His colleague Soe Thein would succeed while he could fail to be elected to the Pyithu Hluttaw.
