= Nyan Tun Aung =

Burmese politician (born 1948)

- ဉာဏ်ထွန်းအောင်

Minister for Transport of Myanmar
- In office 30 March 2011 – 30 March 2016
- President: Thein Sein

Pyithu Hluttaw MP
- In office 31 January 2011 – 30 March 2011
- Succeeded by: Paw Khin (NLD)
- Constituency: Natogyi Township
- Majority: 98,423 (92.55%)

Deputy Minister of Transport

Ministry of Rail Transportation
- In office 14 August 2015 – 30 March 2016
- Preceded by: Than Htay

Personal details
- Born: 8 June 1948 (age 77) Natogyi, Burma
- Party: Union Solidarity and Development Party
- Spouse: Wai Wai

Military service
- Allegiance: Myanmar
- Branch/service: Myanmar Air Force
- Years of service: -2010
- Rank: Colonel

Nyan Tun Aung (Burmese: ဉာဏ်ထွန်းအောင်) was the Minister for Transport of Myanmar. He has served as the Deputy Minister for Transport and was a Colonel in the Myanmar Air Force.
