= Khin San Yi =

Burmese economist and politician

- ခင်စန်းရီ
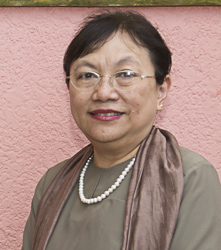
- Khin San Yi in 2013

Minister of Science and Technology
- In office December 2015 – 30 March 2016
- Deputy: Aung Kyaw Myat; Ba Shwe (respectively)
- Preceded by: Ko Ko Oo
- Succeeded by: Position abolished

Minister of Education
- In office February 2014 – 30 March 2016
- Deputy: Zaw Min Aung; Thant Shin
- Preceded by: Mya Aye
- Succeeded by: Aung San Suu Kyi

Deputy Minister of National Planning and Economic Development
- In office April 2012 – February 2014

Rector of Yangon Institute of Economics
- In office 2008–2012
- Preceded by: Kan Zaw
- Succeeded by: San Lwin

Personal details
- Education: Yangon Institute of Economics; University of Göttingen
- Occupation: Development economist

Khin San Yi (Burmese: ခင်စန်းရီ; also spelt Khin San Yee) is a Burmese development economist, previously served as Minister for Education of Myanmar and Minister for Science and Technology of Myanmar from February 2014 to 30 March 2016. She became the second Burmese woman to be appointed minister by the Thein Sein administration. She was appointed by Thein Sein after the death of her predecessor, Mya Aye and Ko Ko Oo, in December 2013 and December 2015.

She is also a former rector of the Yangon Institute of Economics, serving from 2008 to 2012. In April 2012, she was appointed as a deputy minister at the Ministry of National Planning and Economic Development, where she served under Kan Zaw until his recommendation that she be appointed Minister of Education.

She is an alumna of the Yangon Institute of Economics, graduating with a bachelor's degree in commerce (specialty in accounting and auditing) and a master's degree in trade and marketing. She pursued doctorate studies at the University of Göttingen in Germany, earning a doctorate degree in economics degree in 1996. She began pursuing doctorate studies in Germany in 1989. However, her studies were interrupted when the Burmese government recalled all foreign exchange students in Europe after being subjected by sanctions. She completed her studies five years later, in 1996.
