= Mya Aye (minister) =

- မြအေး

Minister of Education
- In office March 2011 – December 2013
- Preceded by: Chan Nyein
- Succeeded by: Khin San Yi

Rector of Mandalay University
- In office 2006–2010
- Preceded by: Dr Nyunt Lwin
- Succeeded by: Dr Khin Swe Myint

Personal details
- Died: December 2013

Mya Aye (Burmese: မြအေး) was a Burmese educator. He was Burmese Minister of Education, serving from March 2011 until his death in December 2013. He was previously a rector at Mandalay University.
