= Thein Htaik =

- သိန်းထိုက်

Union Auditor General of Myanmar
- Incumbent
- Assumed office 7 September 2012
- Preceded by: Lun Maung

Minister of Mines of Burma
- In office 30 March 2011 – 7 September 2012
- Succeeded by: Myint Aung, Dr.

Pyithu Hluttaw MP
- In office 31 January 2011 – 30 March 2011
- Preceded by: Constituency established
- Succeeded by: Myo Aung (NLD)
- Constituency: Dagon Seikkan Township
- Majority: 20,119 (55.25%)

Inspector General for the Ministry of Defence

Personal details
- Born: 8 February 1952 (age 74) Rangoon, Burma
- Party: Union Solidarity and Development Party

Military service
- Allegiance: Myanmar
- Branch/service: Myanmar Army
- Rank: Major General

Thein Htaik (Burmese: သိန်းထိုက်) is the Union Auditor General of Myanmar, appointed to the post on 7 September 2012. He has served as the Minister for Mines, the Deputy Minister for Transport and was a Colonel in the Myanmar Air Force. He has served as an Inspector General in the Ministry of Defence and is a retired major general in the Myanmar Army.
