= Ko Ko Oo =

- ကိုကိုဦး

Minister of Science and Technology
- In office 30 September 2012 – 9 December 2015
- Preceded by: Aye Myint
- Succeeded by: Khin San Yee

Deputy Minister of Science and Technology
- In office March 2011 – September 2012

Personal details
- Born: 1961
- Died: December 9, 2015 (aged 53–54)
- Education: Osaka University Yangon Technological University
- Occupation: Scientist

Ko Ko Oo (Burmese: ကိုကိုဦး; 1961 – 9 December 2015) was a scientist, previously served as Minister for Science and Technology of Myanmar (MOST) from September 2012 to December 2015 until his death. He received his PhD in Nuclear Physics from Osaka University, Japan. He previously served as deputy minister of MOST from March 2011 to September 2012. He was previously the director of the Department of Technical and Vocational Education (DTVE) and Director General of the Department of Atomic Energy.
