= Ministry of Rail Transportation (Myanmar) =

Ministry of Railway in Myanmar

- ရထားပို့ဆောင်ရေးဝန်ကြီးဌာန
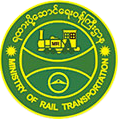
- Seal of the Ministry of Rail Transportation

Ministry overview
- Superseding ministry: Ministry of Transportation and Communication
- Jurisdiction: Myanmar
- Headquarters: Naypyidaw
- Minister responsible: Nyan Tun Aung
- Website: www.railways.gov.mm

The Ministry of Rail Transportation (Burmese: ရထားပို့ဆောင်ရေးဝန်ကြီးဌာန [jətʰá po̰sʰàʊɰ̃jé wʊ̀ɰ̃dʑí tʰàna̰]) was the Myanmar government ministry that oversaw railways in Myanmar.

== List of heads ==
- Pan Aung
- Aung Min
- Zayar Aung
- Than Htay
- Nyan Tun Aung
- Thant Zin Mg

== See also ==
- Rail transport in Myanmar
- History of rail transport in Myanmar
- Myanmar Railways
- Yangon Central Railway Station
- Yangon Circular Railway
- Yunnan-Burma Railway
