= Win Tun =

Myanmar cabinet minister, 2011 to 2016

- ဝင်းထွန်း

Minister of Environmental Conservation and Forestry
- In office March 2011 – 30 March 2016
- Deputy: Aye Myint Maung, Dr. Thet Thet Zin
- Preceded by: Thein Aung
- Succeeded by: Ohn Win

Managing Director of Myanma Timber Enterprise
- In office ?–?

Personal details
- Education: Defence Services Academy, Myanmar
- Occupation: Military Officer, Civil Servant, Politician

Military service
- Rank: Colonel

Win Tun (Burmese: ဝင်းထွန်း) was the Minister of Environmental Conservation and Forestry of Myanmar from 2011 to 2016. He was appointed in February 2011 by President Thein Sein. He was previously Managing-Director of the Ministry of Forestry during the State Peace and Development Council era.
