= Tin Naing Thein =

Burmese general & politician (born 1955)

- တင်နိုင်သိန်း
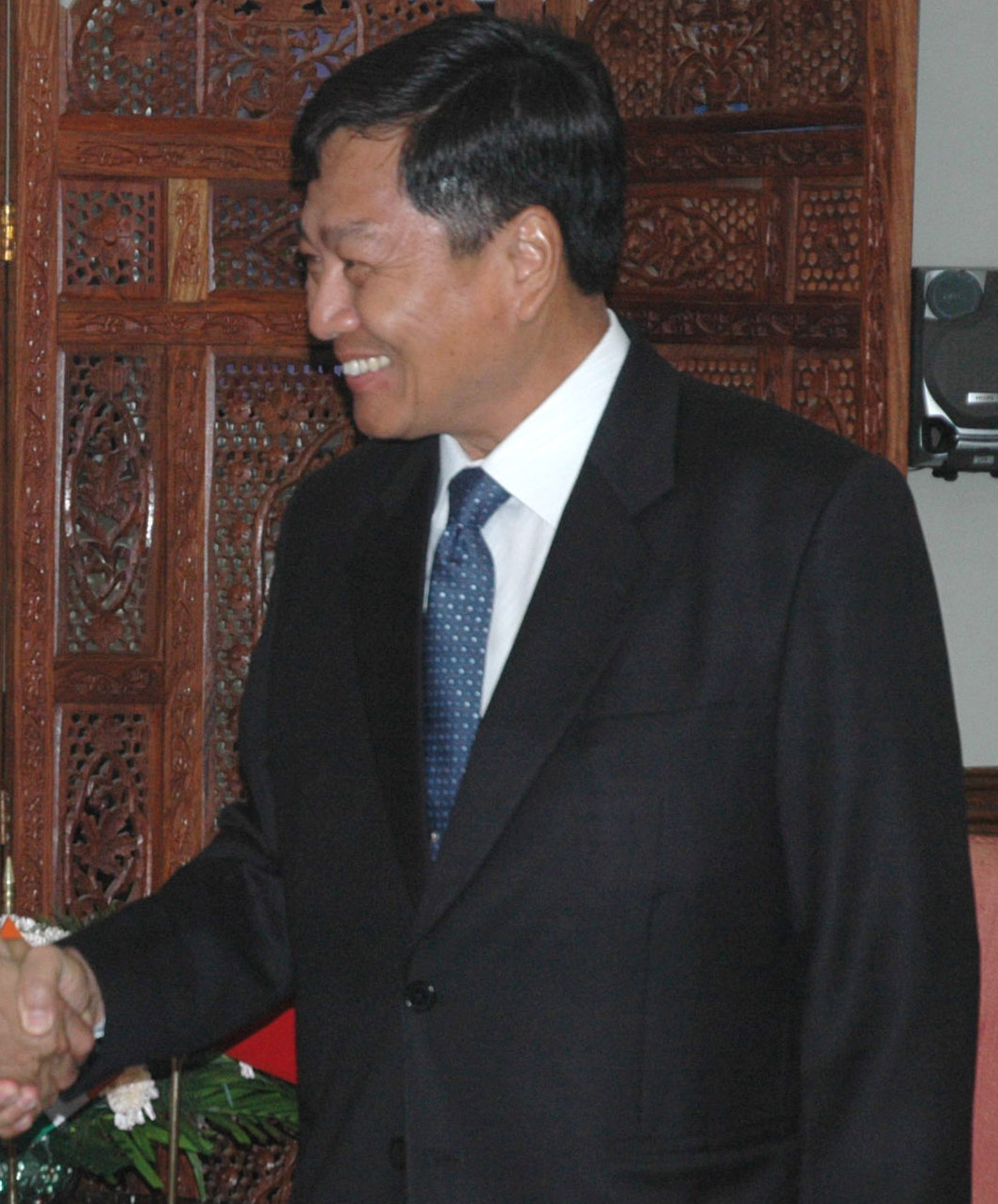
- Tin Naing Thein in 2008

Minister of the President's Office of Myanmar
- In office 27 August 2012 – 12 August 2015 Serving with Thein Nyunt, Soe Maung, Soe Thein, Aung Min and Hla Tun
- Preceded by: Position established

Minister for National Planning and Economic Development of Myanmar
- In office 30 March 2011 – 27 August 2012

MP of the Pyithu Hluttaw
- In office 31 January 2011 – 30 March 2011
- Preceded by: Constituency established
- Succeeded by: Than Ngwe
- Constituency: Kalaw Township
- Majority: 52,543 (65%)

Minister for Commerce of Myanmar
- In office 18 September 2004 – 30 March 2011

General Secretary of the Union Solidarity and Development Party
- In office August 2015 – 23 August 2016
- Preceded by: Maung Maung Thein
- Succeeded by: Thet Naing Win

Deputy Minister for Forestry of Myanmar
- In office ?–?

Personal details
- Born: 1955 (age 70–71) Burma
- Party: Union Solidarity and Development Party
- Spouse: Aye Aye

Military service
- Allegiance: Burma
- Branch/service: Myanmar Army
- Rank: Brigadier General

Tin Naing Thein (Burmese: တင်နိုင်သိန်း; born 1955) is the former Minister of the President's Office of Myanmar, Minister for National Planning and Economic Development and Minister for Livestock and Fisheries. He is a retired brigadier general in the Myanmar Army and previously held the posts of Minister for Commerce and Deputy Minister for Forestry. Tin Naing Thein was elected General Secretary of the Union Solidarity and Development Party, in office from October 2012 to August 2015 successor by Thet Naing Win, former Minister of Border Affairs and retired lieutenant general.
