= Hla Tun =

Burmese politician

- လှထွန်း

Minister of the President's Office of Myanmar (Burma)
- Incumbent
- Assumed office 27 August 2012 Serving with Thein Nyunt, Soe Maung, Soe Thein, Aung Min and Tin Naing Thein
- Preceded by: Position established
- Succeeded by: Aung San Suu Kyi

Minister for Finance and Revenue of Myanmar
- In office 1 February 2003 – 27 August 2012
- Preceded by: Khin Maung Thein
- Succeeded by: Win Shein

Pyithu Hluttaw MP
- In office 31 January 2011 – 30 March 2011
- Preceded by: Constituency established
- Succeeded by: Zaw Myint Maung (NLD)
- Constituency: Kyaukpadaung Township
- Majority: 113,697 (76.57%)

Personal details
- Born: 11 July 1951 (age 74) Rangoon, Burma
- Party: Union Solidarity and Development Party
- Spouse: Khin Than Win

Military service
- Allegiance: Myanmar
- Branch/service: Myanmar Army
- Years of service: -2010
- Rank: Major General

Hla Tun (Burmese: လှထွန်း, also spelt Hla Htun) is the incumbent Minister of the President's Office of Myanmar (Burma) and a former Minister for Finance and Revenue of Myanmar. He is a retired Major General in the Myanmar Army and served as Director of Military Ordnance before he joined the Cabinet.
