= Myint Maung =

Thura Myint Maung
- မြင့်မောင်

Minister for Religious Affairs of Myanmar
- In office 25 August 2003 – 16 January 2013
- Succeeded by: Hsan Sint

MP of the Pyithu Hluttaw
- In office 31 January 2011 – 30 March 2011
- Preceded by: Constituency established
- Succeeded by: Su Su Lwin (NLD)
- Constituency: Thongwa Township
- Majority: 45,277 (58.59%)

Personal details
- Born: 19 January 1941 (age 85) Yesagyo, Burma
- Party: Union Solidarity and Development Party
- Children: Aung Kyaw Soe; Zin Myint Maung

Military service
- Allegiance: Myanmar
- Branch/service: Myanmar Army
- Years of service: –2010
- Rank: Brigadier-General

Thura Myint Maung (Burmese: မြင့်မောင်) was the Minister for Religious Affairs of Myanmar (Burma). He is a retired Brigadier General in the Myanmar Army. He resigned on 16 January 2013.
