= Khin Maung Myint =

Burmese politician and retired general

- ခင်မောင်မြင့်

Member-elect of the Pyithu Hluttaw for Zabuthiri, Naypyidaw
- Assuming office 16 March 2026
- Succeeding: Vacant

Minister for Construction of Myanmar
- In office 5 February 2009 – 28 August 2012

Minister of Electrical Power 2 of Myanmar
- In office 16 May 2006 – 30 March 2011

Pyithu Hluttaw MP
- In office 31 January 2011 – 30 March 2011
- Preceded by: Constituency established
- Succeeded by: Khin Maung Thein (NLD)
- Constituency: Sagaing Township
- Majority: 91,015 (73.14%)

Personal details
- Born: 24 May 1951 (age 74) Sagaing, Burma
- Party: Union Solidarity and Development Party
- Spouse: Win Win Nu

Military service
- Allegiance: Myanmar
- Branch/service: Myanmar Army
- Rank: Major-General

Khin Maung Myint (Burmese: ခင်မောင်မြင့်) is a former Minister for Construction of Myanmar (Burma). He is a retired Major General in the Myanmar Army. He resigned on 28 August 2012. Maung Myint ran and was elected as the USDP candidate for Pyithu Hluttaw in Zabuthiri Township, Naypyidaw Union Territory, in the 2025–26 Myanmar general election, considered a sham process by independent observers.
