= Ministry of Industry (Myanmar) =

Government ministry of Myanmar

- စက်မှု ဝန်ကြီးဌာန

Agency overview
- Formed: 1952
- Jurisdiction: Government of Myanmar
- Headquarters: Office No.30, Naypyidaw; 19.8182448°N 96.1398432°E
- Minister responsible: Charlie Than
- Website: industry.gov.mm

The Ministry of Industry (Burmese: စက်မှု ဝန်ကြီးဌာန) was a ministry in the Government of Myanmar that produced consumer products such as pharmaceuticals and foodstuffs, textiles, ceramics, paper and chemical products, home utilities and construction materials, assorted types of vehicles, earth-moving equipment, diesel engines, automotive parts, turbines and generators, CNC machines, transformers, agricultural machines, rubber and tires, etc.

== History ==
With the aim to strengthen the organisations and effective management of the Ministry of Industry No. 1 and Ministry of Industry No. 2, the Ministry of Industry was reorganised with the combination of those Ministries since 2 December 2011.

seal of MOIn (2013–2016)

== Policy ==
- Establishment of an industrialised state based on modernised agriculture, with wide development of value-added agricultural products and agro-based industries. Emphasis is also to be given to the development of small and medium enterprise leading to the establishment of heavy industries.
- Production of import substitution products and export products promotion shall be attempted by the development of small and medium enterprises, leading to setting up of heavy industries.
- Promotion of the private sector and development of public-private partnerships are prioritised and invitation for co-operation in technology transfer, production methods and investment promotion for the development of the industrial sector.
- Efficient utilisation of available natural resources and promotion of value-added products based on locally available natural resources.

== Departmental bodies ==
The Ministry of Industry is organised with two directorates, six enterprises and one central research and development centre as follows:

- Union Ministerial Office
- Directorate of Industry (DI)
- Directorate of Industrial Supervision and Inspection (DISI)
- No. 1 Heavy Industries Enterprise (HIE-1)
- No. 2 Heavy Industries Enterprise (HIE-2)
- No. 3 Heavy Industries Enterprise (HIE-3)
- Textile Industries (TI)
- Pharmaceutical and Foodstuff Industries (PFI)
- Paper and Home Utility Industries (PHUI)
- Central Research and Development Centre (CR&DC)

=== Directorate of Industry ===
The Directorate of Industry coordinates the activities of the enterprises under the ministry in accordance with the directions and guidelines of the ministry. It also negotiates with foreign and local organisations for new projects, acts as a representative of ministry in the activities related to ASEAN and international organisations. Besides, it undertakes the drafting and compilation of projects, policy and plans, financial and budget requirements, legal and personnel matters and other affairs concerning the enterprises.

==== Departments ====
The Directorate of Industry is headed by the Director General and organised with seven departments as mentioned below:

- Planning Department
- Law Department
- International Relation Department
- Finance Department
- Supervision Department
- Human Resource Department
- Administrative Department

There are six industrial training centres under the supervision of the Directorate of Industry. They are:

- No. 1 Industrial Training Centre (Sinde)
- No. 2 Industrial Training Centre (Mandalay)
- No. 3 Industrial Training Centre (Thagaya)
- No. 4 Industrial Training Centre (Pakokku)
- No. 5 Industrial Training Centre (Magway)
- No. 6 Industrial Training Centre (Myingyan)

=== No.1 Heavy Industries Enterprise ===
No. 1 Heavy Industries Enterprise had produced various kinds of light and heavy motor vehicles, passenger cars, trucks, automotive parts, multipurpose and heavy diesel engines, earth moving equipment, construction equipment, steel billets and pig irons. On 25 January 2011, Myanmar Automobile and Diesel Engine Industries (MADI) and Myanmar Agricultural and Manufacturing Industries (MAMI) were reorganised as No. 1 General Heavy Industries Enterprise. On 4 April 2012, the name was changed to No. 1 Heavy Industries Enterprise.

On 1 April 2014, No. 1 Heavy Industries Enterprise was newly reorganised with seven heavy industries as mentioned below:

- No. 11 Heavy Industry (Yangon)
- No. 12 Heavy Industry (Htonbo)
- No. 13 Heavy Industry (Magway)
- No. 14 Heavy Industry (Thagaya)
- No. 15 Heavy Industry (Thagaya)
- No. 1 Steel Mill (Myingyan)
- No. 2 Steel Mill (Pangpet)

=== No. 2 Heavy Industries Enterprise ===
No. 2 Heavy Industries Enterprise is responsible for producing household electrical and electric goods, machine tools with CNC control such as lathe machines, milling machines, grinding machines and drilling machines, PVC wire, power cables, lead acid batteries, transformers, turbines and generators, low-power LEDs, high-power LEDs, solar, maintenance-free batteries, different kinds of tires for transportation vehicles, passenger cars, agricultural tractors and power tillers. In January 2011, Myanmar Machine Tools and Electrical Industries and Myanmar Tyre and Rubber Industries were reorganised as No. 2 General Heavy Industries Enterprise and the name was changed to No. 2 Heavy Industries Enterprise on 4 April 2012.

The following industries are under the supervision of No. 2 Heavy Industries Enterprise:

- No. 21 Heavy Industry (Thaton)
- No. 22 Heavy Industry (Belin)
- No. 23 Heavy Industry (Nyang Chay Htauk)
- No. 24 Heavy Industry (Dagon)
- No. 25 Heavy Industry (Myaing)
- No. 26 Heavy Industry (Thagaya)
- No. 27 Industrial Raw Material Department (Kyaikhto)

=== No. 3 Heavy Industries Enterprise ===
No. 3 Heavy Industries Enterprise is one of the leading manufacturers of ordinary Portland cement, refractory brick, ceramic wares, high tension ceramic insulator, float glass, agricultural machinery and equipment in Myanmar. In 1964, it was founded as the Administration of Ceramic Corporation. The name of the corporation was changed to Ceramic Industries Corporation in 1972 and Myanma Ceramic Industries in 1988. On 4 April 2012, the name was changed to No. 3 Heavy Industries Enterprise.

The following industries are under the supervision of No. 3 Heavy Industries Enterprise:

- No. 31 Heavy Industry (Thayet)
- No. 32 Heavy Industry (Kyangin)
- No. 33 Heavy Industry (Kyaukse)
- No. 34 Heavy Industry (Thayarwaddy)
- No. 35 Heavy Industry (Chauk)
- No. 36 Heavy Industry (Kyaukse)
- No. 37 Heavy Industry (Sinde)
- No. 38 Heavy Industry (Malun)
- No. 39 Heavy Industry (Inngone)

=== Textile Industries ===
Textile Industries (TI) has been in continuous operation since 1972, when it was established as Textile Industries Corporation. It was renamed Myanma Textile Industries (MTI) in 1989. The current name, Textile Industries, was adopted on 4 April 2012. Today, it is called Textile Industries (TI) and is operated as a manufacturer of textile products by eleven main textile factories and seven branch textile factories. TI is a leading manufacturer of textile, clothing and apparel solely for the domestic market.

=== Pharmaceutical and Foodstuff Industries ===
Myanmar Pharmaceutical Industries and Myanmar Foodstuff Industries were combined as the Pharmaceutical and Foodstuff Industries (PFI) on 1 August 2010.

Head office and state-owned factories are as follows;

- Head office of the Pharmaceutical and Foodstuff Industries
- No. 1 Pharmaceutical Factory (Yangon)
  - Hepatitis 'B' Vaccine Factory (Ywa Tha Gyi Branch)
- No. 2 Pharmaceutical Factory (Inyaung)
- No. 2 Plastic Factory (Kyaukse)
- Horse and Sheep Breeding Farm (Yanpe)

=== Paper & Home Utility Industries ===
Paper and Home Utilities Industries is producing high grade pulp (paper) (BKP), high grade paper (cultural paper, coated paper), writing and printing paper, kraft paper, cardboard paper, chemithermomechanical pulp (CTMP), news-print paper and hydrogen peroxide, footwear products, plastic products, household stainless steel wares, household enamel wares, hospital used steel furniture and hospital used stainless steel wares. On 4 April 2012, Myanma Paper and Chemical Industries and Myanma Home Utility Industries were reorganised as Paper and Home Utilities Industries.

The following industries are under the supervision of Paper and Home Utilities Industries:

- High-grade Paper Mills (Thapaung)
- Paper Mill (Yae Ni)
- Bicycle Factory (Kyaukse)
- Wear House Factory (Minsu)
- Sewing Machine Factory (Kyaukse)

=== Central Research and Development Centre ===
The Central Research and Development Centre is involved in research and development of foods and drugs, raw materials, machinery and component parts for use by local industries.

The following divisions are under the supervision of the Central Research and Development Centre:

- Foods and Drugs Research Division (Yangon)
- Engineering Research Division (Thagaya)
