= Union Solidarity and Development Party =

Ruling political party in Myanmar

Union Solidarity and Development Party ပြည်ထောင်စုကြံ့ခိုင်ရေးနှင့် ဖွံ့ဖြိုးရေးပါတီ
- Abbreviation: USDP
- Chairman: Khin Yi
- Secretary-General: Thet Naing Win
- Spokesperson: Nandar Hla Myint
- Vice Chairmen: Myat Hein; Hla Tun; Myo Zaw Thein
- Founder: Thein Sein
- Founded: 29 April 2010; 16 years ago
- Preceded by: Union Solidarity and Development Association
- Headquarters: Dekkhinathiri Township, Naypyidaw
- Ideology: Militarism; Ultranationalism; Buddhist nationalism Right-wing populism
- Political position: Far-right
- Religion: Theravada Buddhism
- International affiliation: For the Freedom of Nations!
- Colours: Green
- Amyotha Hluttaw: 108 / 157
- Pyithu Hluttaw: 232 / 265
- Ministers: 10 / 31

Party flag

Website
- usdp.org.mm

The Union Solidarity and Development Party (USDP) (Note: Burmese: ပြည်ထောင်စုကြံ့ခိုင်ရေးနှင့် ဖွံ့ဖြိုးရေးပါတီ, romanized: pyihtaungsukyankhaingyaynhinhpwanphyoyayparty) is an ultranationalist, pro-military political party in Myanmar. Alongside the National League for Democracy, it is one of Myanmar's two principal national parties.

USDP is the successor to the former ruling military junta's mass organisation, the Union Solidarity and Development Association (USDA), and serves as the electoral proxy of the Tatmadaw (military), which operates as a state within a state. Many of its political candidates and leadership are retired generals. It supports authoritarian military leadership. USDP was founded by Prime Minister Thein Sein to contest the 2010 Myanmar general election; the party was headed by Sein until 2013. Since 2022, it has been led by Khin Yi, who was installed as a loyalist of military leader Min Aung Hlaing.

== History ==
=== Establishment ===
The USDP was formed on 29 April 2010 by Thein Sein and senior military officers who had retired from the armed forces, in the lead-up to the 2010 Myanmar general election. On 6 July 2010, the military junta permitted its predecessor, the Union Solidarity and Development Association (USDA), to dissolve itself and transfer its assets and office to the USDP. This included assets from the USDA's conglomerate, the Myan Gon Myint group of companies, which had interests in key sectors of Myanmar's economy.

=== 2010 election ===
The USDP won the 2010 general election, which was boycotted by the opposition. On 2 May 2011, Shwe Mann assumed the office as temporary chairman of USDP. Htay Oo as deputy chairman, Aung Thaung and Thein Zaw as Secretary 1 and 2. Maung Oo was appointed as Disciplinary Official of the USDP. Former Yangon Mayor Aung Thein Lin was appointed to lead the USDP's Yangon branch.

On 16 October 2012, Thein Sein was re-elected as the chairman of the Union Solidarity and Development Party (USDP) at the USDP's first party conference in Naypyidaw. Because of mounting criticism over his dual role, Thein Sein handed over the position of USDP chairman to Shwe Mann on 1 May 2013. On 13 August 2015, it was reported that chairman Shwe Mann and general secretary Maung Maung Thein had been removed from their positions.

=== 2015 election ===
In the lead-up to the 2015 general election, USDP member of parliament, Tin Aye stepped down to become chair of the Union Election Commission (UEC), the country's electoral regulatory body, prompting concerns over the UEC's lack of impartiality and independence.

The opposition National League for Democracy contested the 2015 election. During the election, USDP secured less than 30% of the popular vote, gaining only 8.4% of elected seats in the Pyidaungsu Hluttaw.

=== 2020 election and military coup ===
Following a second landslide victory for the National League for Democracy in the 2020 general election, the USDP baselessly alleged massive electoral fraud alongside the Tatmadaw, unsuccessfully challenged the election outcome in the courts, and called for the election to be re-run. After all constitutional means of challenging the election results were exhausted, the USDP supported the 2021 military coup d'état and assumed the presidency and multiple seats on the State Administration Council, the military junta.

On 12 September 2022, Than Htay resigned as the party chairman and handed over immediately to Vice-Chairman Khin Yi, the latter became Acting Chairman. On 5 October 2022, Khin Yi was elected as the new Chairman and officially assumed the party chairmanship. In December 2022, the military junta began replacing hundreds of local government administrators in Yangon Region with USDP supporters.

The USDP was the first party to register under a new junta-enacted electoral law in 2023, and immediately began informally campaigning for the 2025–26 general election. The official campaign period began on 28 October 2025. Throughout the campaign, the USDP accounted for most campaigning, with other parties accounting for only a small share of events.

A 17-18 September 2026 USDP conference to re-elect leaders of the Central Executive Committee (CEC) was cancelled due to a lack of agreements between Aung Lin Dwe and party leaders. According to Myanmar Now, many USDP members became privately dissatisfied when Khin Yi was not chosen as the President of Myanmar. Khin Yi was relected on 20 September, with Aung Lin Dwe absent from the selection process according to The Irrawaddy.

== Ideology ==
The USDP is widely described as a conservative, far-right, ultranationalist party. It effectively serves as a proxy for the nation's military, with many of its political candidates and leadership being retired generals. It has also been described as authoritarian, Buddhist nationalist, and right-wing populist.

== Leadership ==
As of October 2022, USDP is led by:

- Chairman: Khin Yi
- Vice Chairmen: Myat Hein, Hla Tun, Myo Zaw Thein
- General Secretary: Thaung Aye
- Joint General Secretary: Tin Aung Chit

== Funding ==
The USDP owns the shares and assets of former Myan Gon Myint group, a conglomerate with interests in gem mining, construction, agriculture, livestock, and imports and exports. Myan Gon Myint was first established in 1995 with an initial US$500,000 investment, and earned US$2.7 million that year from selling and renting shops in Yangon's markets. Myan Gon Myint appropriated state-owned assets, and revenues from Myan Gon Myint had been used to fund the operations of USDP's predecessor. In June 2020, news emerged that USDP had earned 16 billion kyats (US$11.5 million) between 2006 and 2018, from leasing x-ray cargo scanners to the Customs Department, prompting legislative scrutiny into whether the scanners should be state-owned. USDP's economic activities are in potential violation of Myanmar's Political Parties Registration Law.

USDP party members also pay an annual membership fee (1,000 kyats in 2020), earning the party an additional US$3.5 million per year.

== Presidents ==
| Name | Portrait | Periods in Office | Election |
|---|---|---|---|
| Thein Sein | | 30 March 2011 – 30 March 2016 | 2011 |

== Speakers ==
=== Pyithu Hluttaw (People's Assembly) ===
| Name | Portrait | Periods in Office | Election |
|---|---|---|---|
| Thura Shwe Mann | | 31 January 2011 – 29 January 2016 | 2010 |
| T Khun Myat | | 22 March 2018 – 16 March 2026 | |
| Khin Yi | | 18 March 2026 - Incumbent | 2025–26 |

=== Amyotha Hluttaw (Assembly of Nationalities) ===
| Name | Portrait | Periods in Office | Election |
|---|---|---|---|
| Khin Aung Myint | | 31 January 2011 – 29 January 2016 | 2010 |
| Aung Lin Dwe | | 18 March 2026 - Incumbent | 2025–26 |

== Election results ==
=== House of Nationalities (Amyotha Hluttaw) ===
| Election | Leader | Total seats won | Total votes | Share of votes | +/– | Government |
|---|---|---|---|---|---|---|
| 2010 | Thein Sein | 129 / 224 | 11,781,920 | 58.08 | ▲129 | Majority government |
| 2015 | Thein Sein | 12 / 224 | 6,406,108 | 28.20 | ▼117 | Opposition |
| 2020 | Than Htay | 7 / 224 | 5,923,457 | 22.16 | ▼5 | Not recognised |
| 2025–26 | Khin Yi | 108 / 157 | 5,701,772 | 45.08 | ▲101 | Majority government |

=== House of Representatives (Pyithu Hluttaw) ===
| Election | Leader | Total seats won | Total votes | Share of votes | +/– | Government |
|---|---|---|---|---|---|---|
| 2010 | Thein Sein | 259 / 440 | 11,882,087 | 58.40 | ▲259 | Majority government |
| 2015 | Thein Sein | 30 / 440 | 6,349,879 | 28.33 | ▼229 | Opposition |
| 2020 | Than Htay | 26 / 440 | 5,838,533 | 21.89 | ▼4 | Not recognised |
| 2025–26 | Khin Yi | 231 / 265 | 5,753,096 | 44.20 | ▲205 | Majority government |
