= Aung San Suu Kyi =

Burmese politician (born 1945)

Daw Aung San Suu Kyi
- အောင်ဆန်းစုကြည်
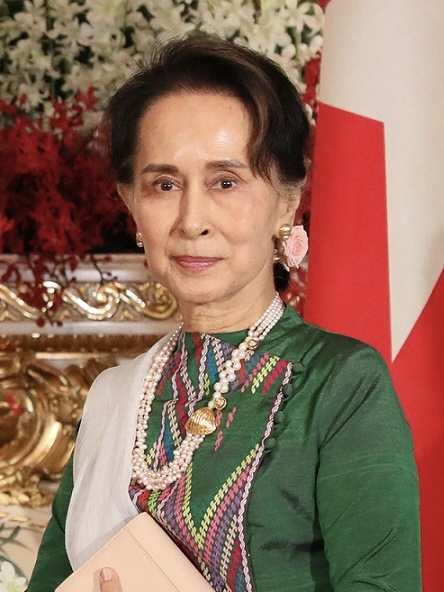
- Aung San Suu Kyi in 2019

State Counsellor of Myanmar
- In office 6 April 2016 – 1 February 2021
- President: Htin Kyaw; Win Myint
- Preceded by: Office established
- Succeeded by: Min Aung Hlaing (as Chairman of the State Administration Council)
Ministerial offices 2016–2021
Union Minister for the President's Office
In office 30 March 2016 – 1 February 2021
President	Htin Kyaw; Win Myint
Preceded by	Aung Min; Hla Tun; Soe Maung; Soe Thein; Thein Nyunt
Succeeded by	Vacant
Union Minister for Foreign Affairs
In office 30 March 2016 – 1 February 2021
President	Htin Kyaw; Win Myint
Preceded by	Wunna Maung Lwin
Succeeded by	Wunna Maung Lwin
Union Minister for Education
In office 30 March 2016 – 5 April 2016
President	Htin Kyaw
Preceded by	Khin San Yi
Succeeded by	Myo Thein Gyi
Union Minister for Electricity and Energy
In office 30 March 2016 – 5 April 2016
President	Htin Kyaw
Preceded by	Khin Maung Soe; Zeya Aung
Succeeded by	Pe Zin Tun

General Secretary of the National League for Democracy
- Incumbent
- Assumed office 27 September 1988
- Preceded by: Office established

Chairperson of the National League for Democracy
- In office 13 December 2011 – 28 March 2023
- Preceded by: Office established
- Succeeded by: Office abolished

Member of the House of Representatives for Kawhmu
- In office 2 May 2012 – 30 March 2016
- Preceded by: Soe Tint
- Succeeded by: Vacant
- Majority: 46,73 (71.38%)

Personal details
- Born: 19 June 1945 (age 81) Rangoon, Burma
- Party: National League for Democracy
- Spouse: Michael Aris (m. 1972; died 1999)
- Children: 2, including Alexander Aris
- Parents: Aung San; Khin Kyi
- Relatives: Aung San Oo (brother); Ba Win (uncle); Sein Win (cousin)
- Education: University of Delhi (BA); St Hugh's College, Oxford (MA); SOAS University of London (M.Phil)
- Awards: Full list
- Aung San Suu Kyi's voice from the BBC programme Desert Island Discs; Recorded 27 January 2013

Aung San Suu Kyi (Note: In this Burmese name, the given name is Aung San Suu Kyi. There is no family name.) (Note: /aʊŋ sɑːn suː tʃiː/; Burmese: အောင်ဆန်းစုကြည်, MLCTS: aung hcan: cu. krany [ʔàʊɰ̃ sʰáɰ̃ sṵ tɕì]) (born 19 June 1945) is a Burmese politician, diplomat, and author who served as the State Counsellor and Union Minister for Foreign Affairs from 2016 to 2021. She has served as the General Secretary of the National League for Democracy (NLD) since the party's founding in 1988 and was registered as its Chairperson while it was a legal party from 2011 to 2023. She played a vital role in Myanmar's transition from military junta to partial democracy in the 2010s. She has been widely described as the de facto leader of Myanmar from 2016 to 2021. She was awarded the 1991 Nobel Peace Prize.

The youngest daughter of Aung San, Father of the Nation of modern-day Myanmar, and Khin Kyi, Aung San Suu Kyi was born in Rangoon, British Burma. After graduating from the University of Delhi in 1964 and St Hugh's College, Oxford, in 1968, she worked at the United Nations for three years. She married Michael Aris in 1972, with whom she had two children. Aung San Suu Kyi rose to prominence in the 8888 Uprising of 8 August 1988 and became the General Secretary of the NLD, which she had newly formed with the help of several retired army officials who criticised the military junta. In the 1990 general election, the NLD won 81% of the seats in Parliament. Still, the results were nullified, as the State Peace and Development Council (SPDC), the military government, refused to hand over power, resulting in an international outcry. She had been detained before the elections and remained under house arrest for almost 15 of the 21 years from 1989 to 2010, becoming one of the world's most prominent political prisoners. In 1999, Time magazine named her one of the "Children of Gandhi" and his spiritual heir to nonviolence. She survived an assassination attempt in the 2003 Depayin massacre when at least 70 people associated with the NLD were killed.

Her party boycotted the 2010 general election, resulting in a decisive victory for the military-backed Union Solidarity and Development Party (USDP). Aung San Suu Kyi became a member of the Pyithu Hluttaw (House of Representatives) while her party won 43 of the 45 vacant seats in the 2012 by-elections. In the 2015 general election, her party won a landslide victory, taking 86% of the seats in the Pyidaungsu Hluttaw, well more than the 67% supermajority needed to ensure that its preferred candidates were elected president and vice president in the Presidential Electoral College. Although she was prohibited from becoming president owing to a clause in the Myanmar Constitution—her late husband and children are foreign citizens—she assumed the newly created role of State Counsellor of Myanmar, a role akin to a prime minister or a head of government.

When she ascended to the office of state counsellor, Aung San Suu Kyi drew criticism from several countries, organisations and figures over Myanmar's inaction in response to the Rohingya genocide in Rakhine State and refusal to acknowledge that the Tatmadaw (armed forces) had committed massacres. Under her leadership, Myanmar also drew criticism for prosecutions of journalists. In 2019, Aung San Suu Kyi appeared in the International Court of Justice where she defended the Myanmar military against allegations of genocide against the Rohingya people.

Aung San Suu Kyi, whose party had won the November 2020 general election, was arrested on 1 February 2021, after a coup d'état that returned the Tatmadaw to power and sparked protests across the country. Several charges were filed against her, and on 6 December 2021, she was sentenced to four years in prison on two of them. On 10 January 2022, she was sentenced to an additional four years on another set of charges. On 12 October 2022, she was convicted of two further charges of corruption. She was sentenced to two terms of three years' imprisonment to be served concurrently. On 30 December 2022, her trials ended with another conviction and an additional sentence of seven years' imprisonment for corruption. Aung San Suu Kyi's final sentence was of 33 years in prison, later reduced to 27 years. In 2026, the government further reduced her sentence and commuted it to house arrest. The United Nations, most European countries, and the United States condemned the arrests, trials, and sentences as politically motivated.

== Name ==
Aung San Suu Kyi, like other Burmese names, includes no surname, but is only a personal name, in her case derived from three relatives: "Aung San" from her father, "Suu" from her paternal grandmother, and "Kyi" from her mother, Khin Kyi.

In Myanmar, Aung San Suu Kyi is often referred to as Daw Aung San Suu Kyi. Daw, literally meaning "aunt", is not part of her name but an honorific for any older and revered woman, akin to "Madam". She is sometimes addressed as Daw Suu or Amay Suu ("Mother Suu") by her supporters.

== Personal life ==
Aung San Suu Kyi was born on 19 June 1945 in Rangoon (Yangon), British Burma. According to Peter Popham, she was born in Hmway Saung, a small village outside Rangoon. Her father, Aung San, allied with the Japanese during World War II. Aung San founded the modern Burmese army and negotiated Burma's independence from the United Kingdom in 1947; he was assassinated by his rivals in the same year. She is a niece of Thakin Than Tun, who was the husband of Khin Khin Gyi, the elder sister of her mother, Khin Kyi.

She grew up with her mother, Khin Kyi, and two brothers, Aung San Lin and Aung San Oo, in Rangoon. Aung San Lin died at the age of eight when he drowned in an ornamental lake on the grounds of the house. Aung San Oo emigrated to San Diego, California, becoming a United States citizen. After Aung San Lin's death, the family moved to a house by Inya Lake where Aung San Suu Kyi met people of various backgrounds, political views, and religions. She was educated at Methodist English High School (Basic Education High School No. 1 Dagon) for much of her childhood in Burma, where she was noted as having a talent for learning languages. She speaks four languages: Burmese, English (with a British accent), French, and Japanese. She is a Theravada Buddhist.

Aung San Suu Kyi's mother, Khin Kyi, gained prominence as a political figure in the newly formed Burmese government. She was appointed Burmese ambassador to India and Nepal in 1960, and Aung San Suu Kyi followed her there. She studied in the Convent of Jesus and Mary School in New Delhi, and graduated from Lady Shri Ram College, a constituent college of the University of Delhi in New Delhi, with a degree in politics in 1964. Suu Kyi continued her education at St Hugh's College, Oxford, obtaining a BA degree in Philosophy, Politics and Economics in 1967, with third-class honours that was promoted per tradition to an MA degree in 1968. After graduating, she lived in New York City with family friend Ma Than E, who was once a popular Burmese pop singer. She worked at the United Nations for three years, primarily on budget matters, writing daily to her future husband, Michael Aris. On 1 January 1972, Aung San Suu Kyi and Aris, a scholar of Tibetan culture and literature living in Bhutan, were married. The next year, she gave birth to their first son, Alexander Aris, in London; their second son, Kim Aris, was born in 1977. Between 1985 and 1987, Aung San Suu Kyi was working toward a Master of Philosophy degree in Burmese literature as a research student at the School of Oriental and African Studies (SOAS), University of London. She was elected as an Honorary Fellow of St Hugh's in 1990. For two years, she was a Fellow at the Indian Institute of Advanced Studies (IIAS) in Shimla, India. She also worked for the government of the Union of Burma.

In 1988, Aung San Suu Kyi returned to Burma to tend to her ailing mother. Aris's visit on Christmas 1995 was the last time that he and Aung San Suu Kyi met, as she remained in Burma and the Burmese dictatorship denied him any further entry visas. In 1997, Aris was diagnosed with prostate cancer that was later found to be terminal. Despite appeals from prominent figures and organisations, including the United States, UN Secretary-General Kofi Annan and Pope John Paul II, the Burmese government did not grant Aris a visa, saying they did not have the facilities to care for him, and instead urged Aung San Suu Kyi to leave the country to visit him. She was at that time temporarily free from house arrest but unwilling to depart, fearing that she would be refused reentry if she left, not trusting the military junta's assurance that she could return.

Aris died on his 53rd birthday on 27 March 1999. Since 1989, when his wife was first placed under house arrest, he had seen her only five times, the last of which was for Christmas in 1995. She was also separated from her children, who live in the United Kingdom, until 2011.

On 2 May 2008, after Cyclone Nargis hit Burma, Aung San Suu Kyi's dilapidated lakeside bungalow lost its roof and electricity, while the cyclone also left entire villages in the Irrawaddy delta submerged. Plans to renovate and repair the house were announced in August 2009. Aung San Suu Kyi was released from house arrest on 13 November 2010.

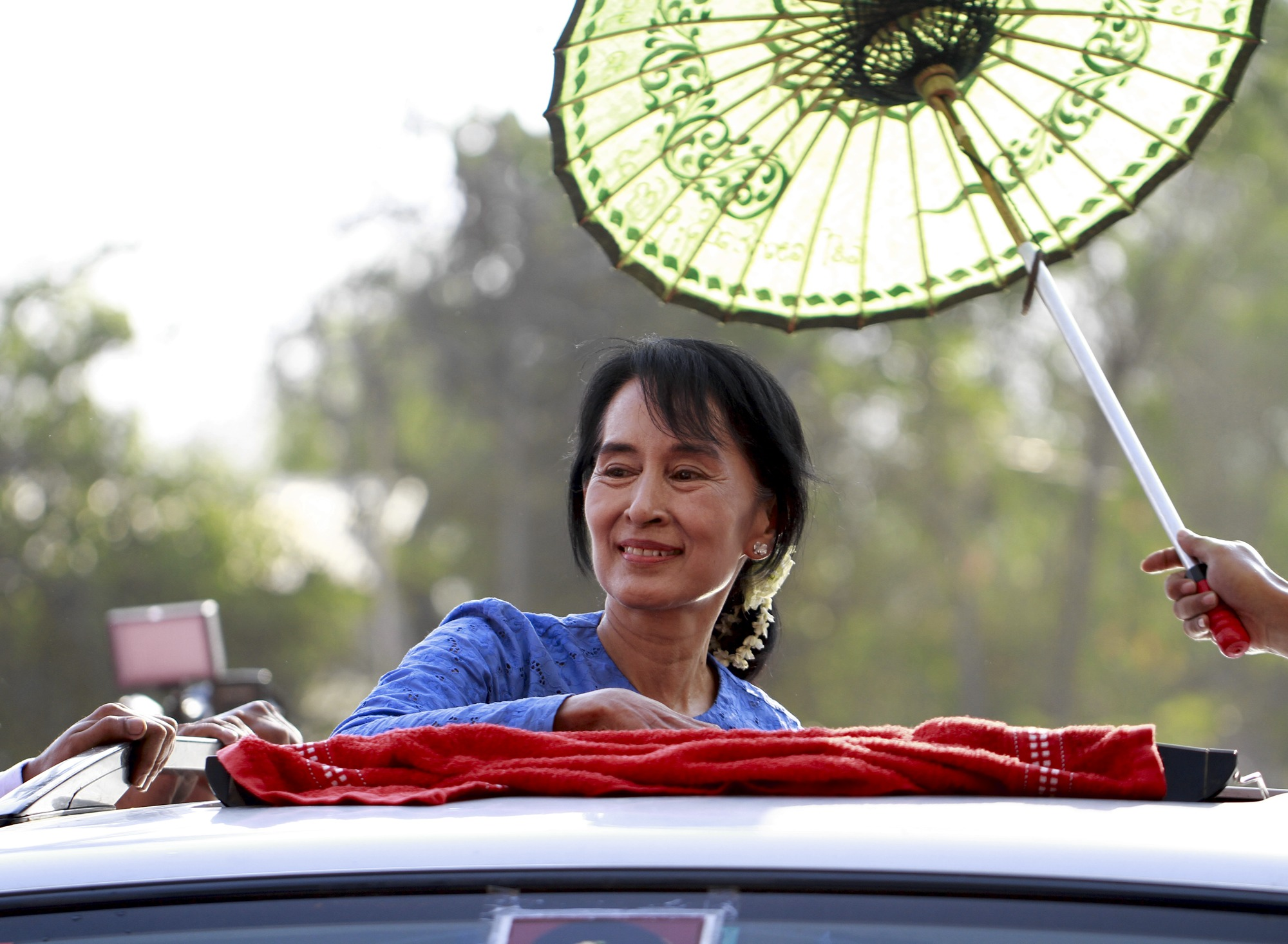
Aung San Suu Kyi at her constituency in Kawhmu township during the 2012 by-election campaign

== Political career ==
=== Political beginning ===
Coincidentally, when Aung San Suu Kyi returned to Burma in 1988, its longtime military leader and head of the ruling party, General Ne Win, stepped down. Mass demonstrations for democracy followed that event on 8 August 1988 (8–8–88, a day seen as auspicious), which were violently suppressed in what came to be known as the 8888 Uprising. On 24 August 1988, she made her first public appearance at the Yangon General Hospital, addressing protestors from a podium. On 26 August, she addressed half a million people at a mass rally in front of the Shwedagon Pagoda in the capital, calling for a democratic government. But in September 1988, a new military junta took power.

Influenced by both Mahatma Gandhi's philosophy of nonviolence and Buddhist concepts, Aung San Suu Kyi entered politics to work for democratisation, helping found the National League for Democracy on 27 September 1988, but was put under house arrest on 20 July 1989. She was offered freedom if she left the country, but she refused. Despite her philosophy of nonviolence, a group of ex-military commanders and senior politicians who joined the NLD during the crisis believed she was too confrontational and left the NLD. But she retained enormous popularity and support among NLD youths with whom she spent most of her time.

During the crisis, the previous democratically elected Prime Minister of Burma, U Nu, began to form an interim government and invited opposition leaders to join him. Indian Prime Minister Rajiv Gandhi had signalled his readiness to recognize the interim government. Aung San Suu Kyi categorically rejected U Nu's plan, saying, "the future of the opposition will be decided by masses of the people". Ex-Brigadier General Aung Gyi, another influential politician at the time of the 8888 Uprising and the first chairman in the history of the NLD, followed suit and also rejected the plan. Aung Gyi later accused several NLD members of being communists and resigned from the party.

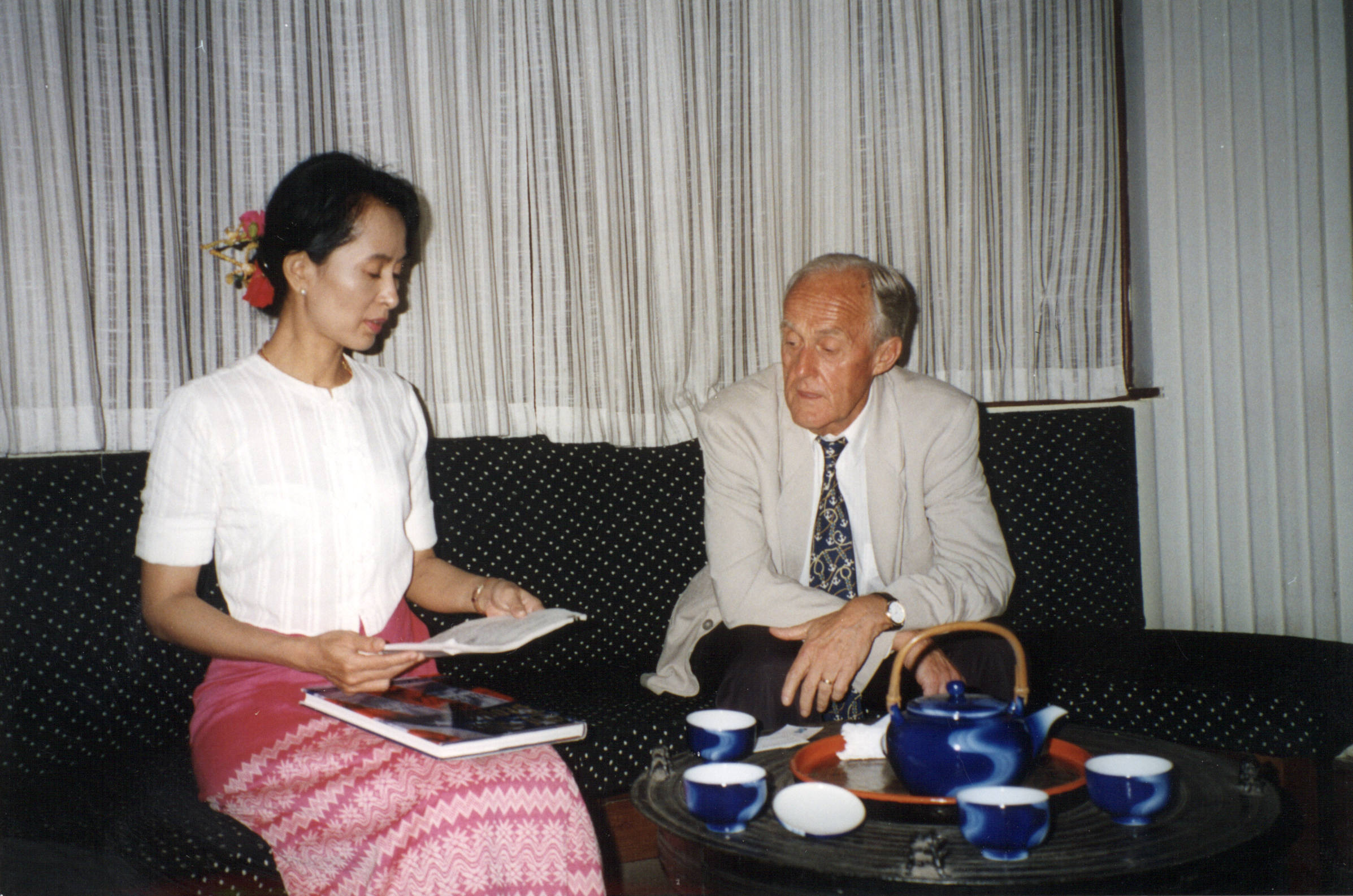
Aung San Suu Kyi meeting with Edgardo Boeninger of the National Democratic Institute for International Affairs, 1995

=== 1990 general election and Nobel Peace Prize ===
In 1990, the military junta called a general election, in which the NLD received 59% of the votes, guaranteeing the NLD 80% of the parliament seats. Some claim that Aung San Suu Kyi would have assumed the office of Prime Minister. Instead, the results were nullified and the military refused to hand over power, resulting in an international outcry. Aung San Suu Kyi was placed under house arrest at her home on University Avenue (16°49′32″N 96°9′1″E) in Rangoon, during which time she was awarded the Sakharov Prize for Freedom of Thought in 1990 and the Nobel Peace Prize one year later. Her sons Alexander and Kim Aris accepted the Nobel Peace Prize on her behalf. Aung San Suu Kyi used the Nobel Peace Prize's US$1.3 million prize money to establish a health and education trust for the Burmese people. Around this time, Aung San Suu Kyi chose nonviolence as an expedient political tactic, saying in 2007, "I do not hold to nonviolence for moral reasons, but for political and practical reasons."

The decision of the Nobel Committee mentions:

The Norwegian Nobel Committee has decided to award the Nobel Peace Prize for 1991 to Aung San Suu Kyi of Myanmar (Burma) for her non-violent struggle for democracy and human rights.

... Suu Kyi's struggle is one of the most extraordinary examples of civil courage in Asia in recent decades. She has become an important symbol in the struggle against oppression ...

... In awarding the Nobel Peace Prize for 1991 to Aung San Suu Kyi, the Norwegian Nobel Committee wishes to honour this woman for her unflagging efforts and to show its support for the many people throughout the world who are striving to attain democracy, human rights, and ethnic conciliation by peaceful means.

— Oslo, 14 October 1991

In 1995, Aung San Suu Kyi delivered the keynote address at the Fourth World Conference on Women in Beijing.

=== 1996 attack ===
On 9 November 1996, the motorcade that Aung San Suu Kyi was travelling in with other NLD leaders Tin Oo and Kyi Maung was attacked in Yangon. About 200 men swooped down on the motorcade, wielding metal chains, metal batons, stones, and other weapons. The car that Aung San Suu Kyi was in had its rear window smashed, and the car with Tin Oo and Kyi Maung had its rear window and two back door windows shattered. It is believed the offenders were members of the Union Solidarity and Development Association (USDA) who were allegedly paid Ks.500/- (@ USD $0.50) each to participate. The NLD lodged an official complaint with the police, and the government reportedly launched an investigation, but no action was taken.

=== House arrest ===
Aung San Suu Kyi was placed under house arrest for a total of 15 years over a 21-year period, on numerous occasions, since beginning her political career, during which time she was prevented from meeting her supporters or international visitors. In an interview, she said that while under house arrest, she spent her time reading philosophy, politics, and biographies her husband had sent her. She also passed the time playing the piano and was occasionally allowed visits from foreign diplomats as well as from her personal physician.

Although under house arrest, Aung San Suu Kyi was granted permission to leave Burma under the condition that she never return, which she refused: "As a mother, the greater sacrifice was giving up my sons, but I was always aware of the fact that others had given up more than me. I never forget that my colleagues who are in prison suffer not only physically, but mentally for their families who have no security outside—in the larger prison of Burma under authoritarian rule."

The media were also prevented from visiting Aung San Suu Kyi, as in 1998, when Italian journalist Maurizio Giuliano, after photographing her, was stopped by customs officials who confiscated all his films and tapes and some notes. In contrast, Aung San Suu Kyi did have visits from government representatives, such as during her autumn 1994 house arrest, when she met the leader of Burma, Senior General Than Shwe and General Khin Nyunt on 20 September in the first meeting since she had been placed in detention. On several occasions during her house arrest, she had periods of poor health and as a result was hospitalised.

The Burmese government detained and kept Aung San Suu Kyi imprisoned because it viewed her as someone "likely to undermine the community peace and stability" of the country, and used both Article 10(a) and 10(b) of the 1975 State Protection Act (granting the government the power to imprison people for up to five years without a trial) and Section 22 of the "Law to Safeguard the State Against the Dangers of Those Desiring to Cause Subversive Acts" against her. She continuously appealed her detention, and many nations and figures continued to call for her release and that of 2,100 other political prisoners in the country. On 12 November 2010, days after the junta-backed Union Solidarity and Development Party (USDP) won elections conducted after a gap of 20 years, the junta finally agreed to sign orders allowing Aung San Suu Kyi's release, and her house arrest ended on 13 November 2010.

=== United Nations involvement ===
The United Nations (UN) has attempted to facilitate dialogue between the junta and Aung San Suu Kyi. On 6 May 2002, after secret confidence-building negotiations led by the UN, the government released her; a government spokesman said she was free to move "because we are confident that we can trust each other". Aung San Suu Kyi proclaimed "a new dawn for the country". But on 30 May 2003, in an incident similar to the 1996 attack, a government-sponsored mob attacked her caravan in the northern village of Depayin, murdering and wounding many of her supporters. Aung San Suu Kyi fled the scene with the help of her driver, Kyaw Soe Lin, but was arrested upon reaching Ye-U. The government imprisoned her at Insein Prison in Rangoon. After she underwent a hysterectomy in September 2003, the government again placed her under house arrest in Rangoon.

The results of the UN facilitation have been mixed; Razali Ismail, UN special envoy to Burma, met with Aung San Suu Kyi. Ismail resigned from his post the next year, partly because he was denied reentry to Burma on several occasions. In 2006, Ibrahim Gambari, UN Undersecretary-General (USG) of Department of Political Affairs, met with Aung San Suu Kyi, the first visit by a foreign official since 2004. He also met with her later that year. On 2 October 2007 Gambari returned to talk to her again after seeing Than Shwe and other members of the senior leadership in Naypyidaw. State television broadcast Aung San Suu Kyi with Gambari, saying they had met twice. This was Aung San Suu Kyi's first appearance in state media in the four years since her current detention began.

The United Nations Working Group for Arbitrary Detention published an Opinion that Aung San Suu Kyi's deprivation of liberty was arbitrary and in contravention of Article 9 of the Universal Declaration of Human Rights, and requested that the Burmese authorities set her free, but the authorities ignored the request. The U.N. report said that according to the Burmese Government's reply, "Daw Aung San Suu Kyi has not been arrested, but has only been taken into protective custody, for her own safety", and while "it could have instituted legal action against her under the country's domestic legislation... it has preferred to adopt a magnanimous attitude, and is providing her with protection in her own interests".

Such claims were rejected by Brigadier-General Khin Yi, Chief of Myanmar Police Force (MPF). On 18 January 2007, the state-run paper New Light of Myanmar accused Aung San Suu Kyi of tax evasion for spending her Nobel Prize money outside the country. The accusation followed the defeat of a US-sponsored United Nations Security Council resolution condemning Burma as a threat to international security; the resolution was defeated because of strong opposition from China, which has strong ties with the military junta (China later voted against the resolution, along with Russia and South Africa).

In November 2007, it was reported that Aung San Suu Kyi would meet her political allies, the National League for Democracy, along with a government minister. The junta made the official announcement on state TV and radio just hours after UN special envoy Ibrahim Gambari ended his second visit to Burma. The NLD confirmed that it had received the invitation to hold talks with Aung San Suu Kyi, but the process delivered few concrete results.

On 3 July 2009, UN Secretary-General Ban Ki-moon went to Burma to pressure the junta into releasing Aung San Suu Kyi and to institute democratic reform. On departing from Burma, Ban said he was "disappointed" with the visit after junta leader Than Shwe refused to let him visit Aung San Suu Kyi, citing her ongoing trial. Ban said he was "deeply disappointed that they have missed a very important opportunity".

=== Periods under detention ===
- 20 July 1989: Placed under house arrest in Rangoon under martial law that allows for detention without charge or trial for three years.
- 10 July 1995: Released from house arrest.
- 23 September 2000: Placed under house arrest.
- 6 May 2002: Released after 19 months.
- 30 May 2003: Arrested after the Depayin massacre, held in secret detention for more than three months before being returned to house arrest.
- 25 May 2007: House arrest extended by one year despite a direct appeal from U.N. Secretary-General Kofi Annan to General Than Shwe.
- 24 October 2007: Reached 12 years under house arrest, solidarity protests held at 12 cities around the world.
- 27 May 2008: House arrest extended another year, which is illegal under both international law and Burmese law.
- 11 August 2009: House arrest extended for 18 more months because of "violation" arising from the May 2009 trespass incident.
- 13 November 2010: Released from house arrest.

=== 2007 anti-government protests ===
Protests led by Buddhist monks during the Saffron Revolution began on 19 August 2007 after steep fuel price increases, and continued each day despite the threat of a military crackdown.

On 22 September 2007, while still under house arrest, Aung San Suu Kyi made a brief public appearance at the gate of her residence in Yangon to accept the blessings of Buddhist monks who were marching in support of human rights. It was reported that she was moved the next day to Insein Prison (where she had been detained in 2003), but meetings with UN envoy Ibrahim Gambari near her Rangoon home on 30 September and 2 October established that she remained under house arrest.

=== 2009 trespass incident ===
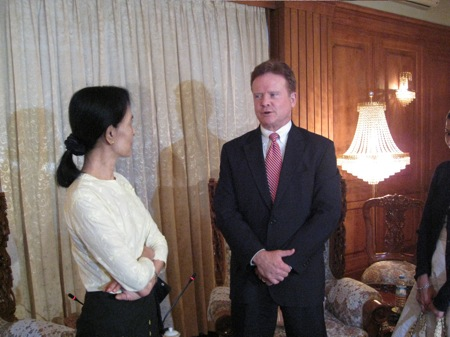
US Senator Jim Webb visiting Aung San Suu Kyi in 2009. Webb negotiated the release of John Yettaw, the man who trespassed in Aung San Suu Kyi's home.

On 3 May 2009, an American man, identified as John Yettaw, swam across Inya Lake to her house uninvited and was arrested when he made his return trip three days later. He had attempted to make a similar trip two years earlier, but for unknown reasons was turned away. He claimed at trial that he was motivated by a divine vision requiring him to notify her of an impending terrorist assassination attempt. On 13 May, Aung San Suu Kyi was arrested for violating the terms of her house arrest because Yettaw, who pleaded exhaustion, was allowed to stay in her house for two days before he attempted the swim back. Aung San Suu Kyi was later taken to Insein Prison, where she could have faced up to five years' confinement for the intrusion. The trial of Aung San Suu Kyi and her two maids began on 18 May, and a small number of protesters gathered outside. Diplomats and journalists were barred from attending the trial, but on one occasion, several diplomats from Russia, Thailand and Singapore and journalists were allowed to meet Aung San Suu Kyi. The prosecution had originally planned to call 22 witnesses. It also accused Yettaw of embarrassing the country. During the ongoing defence case, Aung San Suu Kyi said she was innocent. The defence was allowed to call only one witness (out of four), while the prosecution was permitted to call 14 witnesses. The court rejected two character witnesses, NLD members Tin Oo and Win Tin, and permitted the defence to call only a legal expert. According to one unconfirmed report, the junta was planning to place her in detention again, this time in a military base outside the city. In a separate trial, Yettaw said he swam to Aung San Suu Kyi's house to warn her that her life was "in danger". The national police chief later confirmed that Yettaw was the "main culprit" in the case filed against Aung San Suu Kyi. According to aides, Aung San Suu Kyi spent her 64th birthday in jail sharing biryani rice and chocolate cake with her guards.

Her arrest and subsequent trial received worldwide condemnation by the UN Secretary General Ban Ki-moon, the United Nations Security Council, Western governments, South Africa, Japan and the Association of Southeast Asian Nations, of which Burma is a member. The Burmese government strongly condemned the statement, as it created an "unsound tradition" and criticised Thailand for meddling in its internal affairs. The Burmese Foreign Minister Nyan Win was quoted in the state-run newspaper New Light of Myanmar as saying that the incident "was trumped up to intensify international pressure on Burma by internal and external anti-government elements who do not wish to see the positive changes in those countries' policies toward Burma". Ban responded to an international campaign by flying to Burma to negotiate, but Than Shwe rejected all his requests.

On 11 August 2009, the trial concluded with Aung San Suu Kyi being sentenced to three years' imprisonment with hard labour. This sentence was commuted by the military rulers to further house arrest of 18 months. On 14 August, US Senator Jim Webb visited Burma, visiting with junta leader General Than Shwe and later with Aung San Suu Kyi. During the visit, Webb negotiated Yettaw's release and deportation from Burma. After the verdict, Aung San Suu Kyi's lawyers said they would appeal the 18-month sentence. On 18 August, United States President Barack Obama asked the country's military leadership to set free all political prisoners, including Aung San Suu Kyi. In her appeal, Aung San Suu Kyi had argued that the conviction was unwarranted. However, her appeal against the August sentence was rejected by a Burmese court on 2 October 2009. Although the court accepted the argument that the 1974 constitution, under which she had been charged, was null and void, it also said the provisions of the 1975 security law, under which she had been kept under house arrest, remained in force. The verdict effectively meant that she would be unable to participate in the elections scheduled to take place in 2010—the first in Burma in two decades. Her lawyer stated that her legal team would pursue a new appeal within 60 days.

=== Late 2000s: international support for release ===
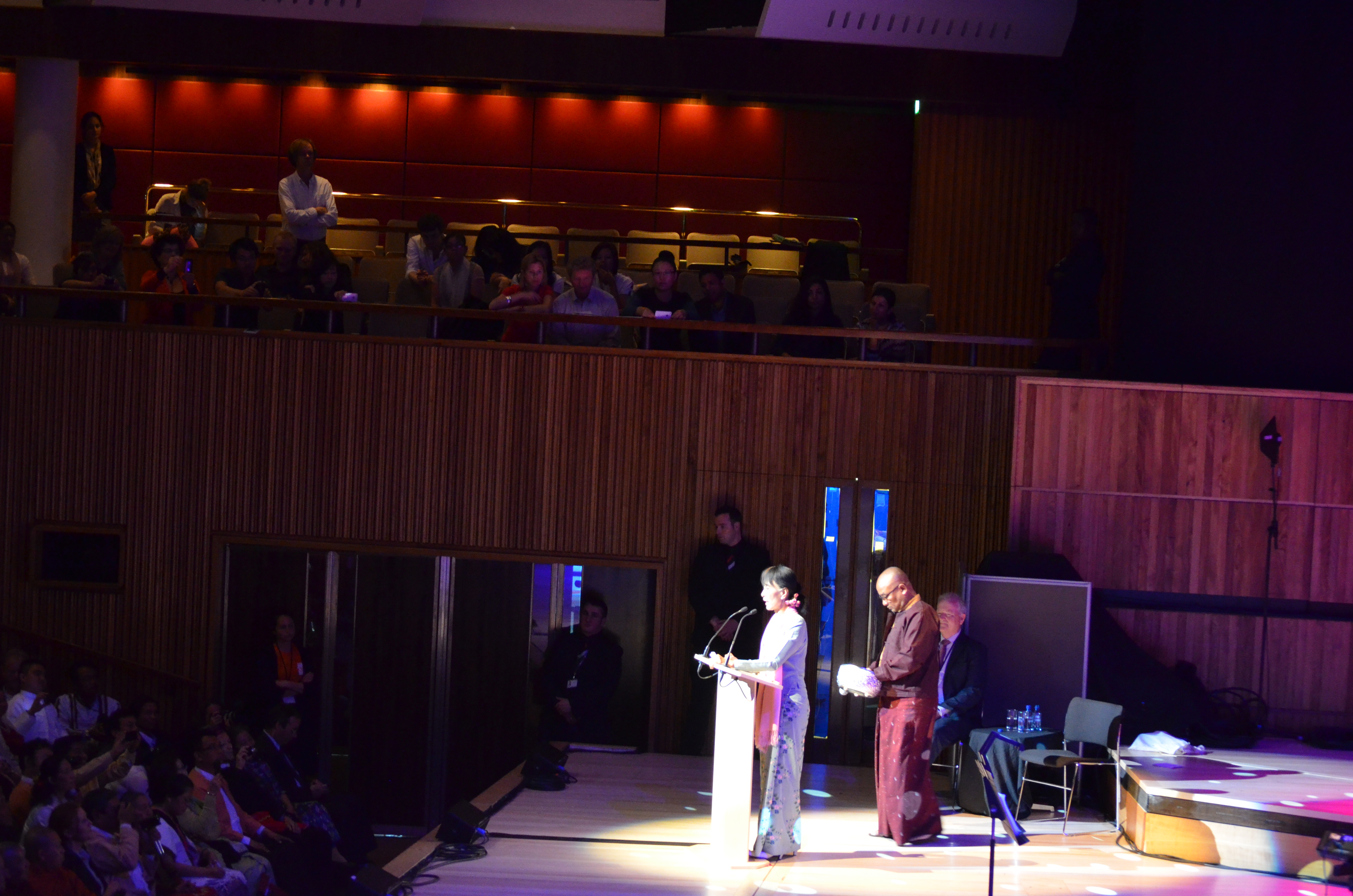
Daw Aung San Suu Kyi at a conference in London, during 5 countries tour of Europe, 2012

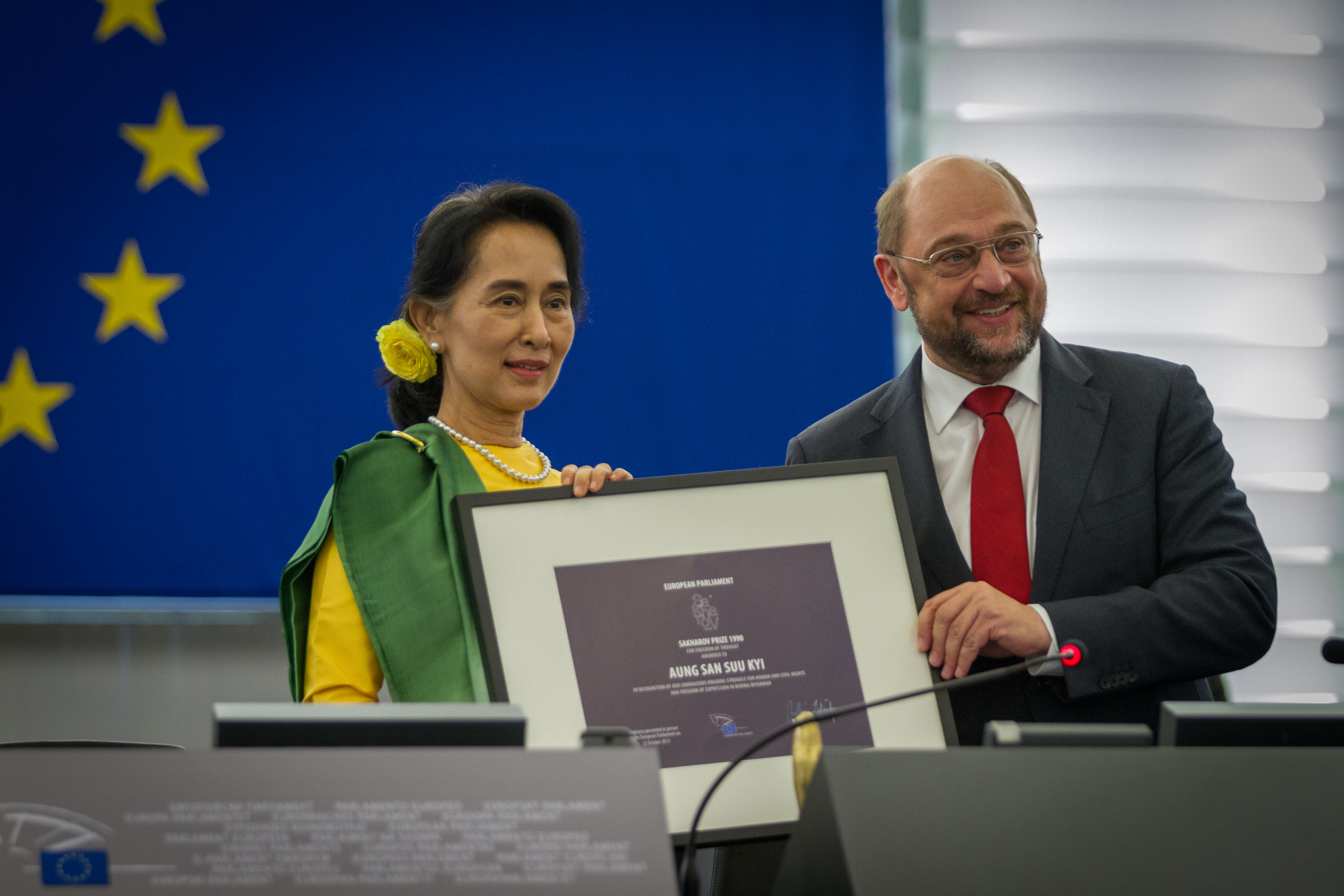
The ceremony of the Sakharov Prize awarded to Aung San Suu Kyi by Martin Schulz, inside the European Parliament's Strasbourg hemicycle, in 2013

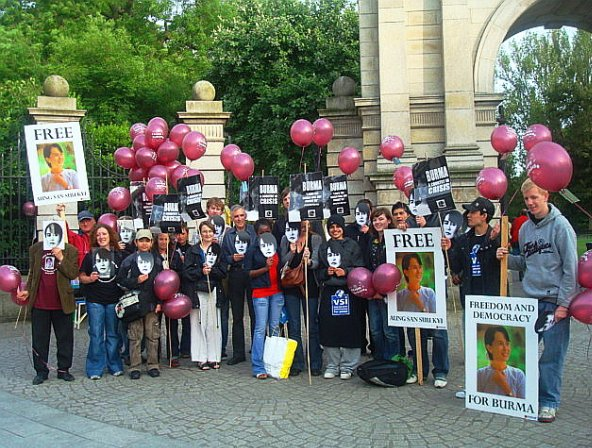
The 2009 celebration of Aung San Suu Kyi's birthday in Dublin, Ireland

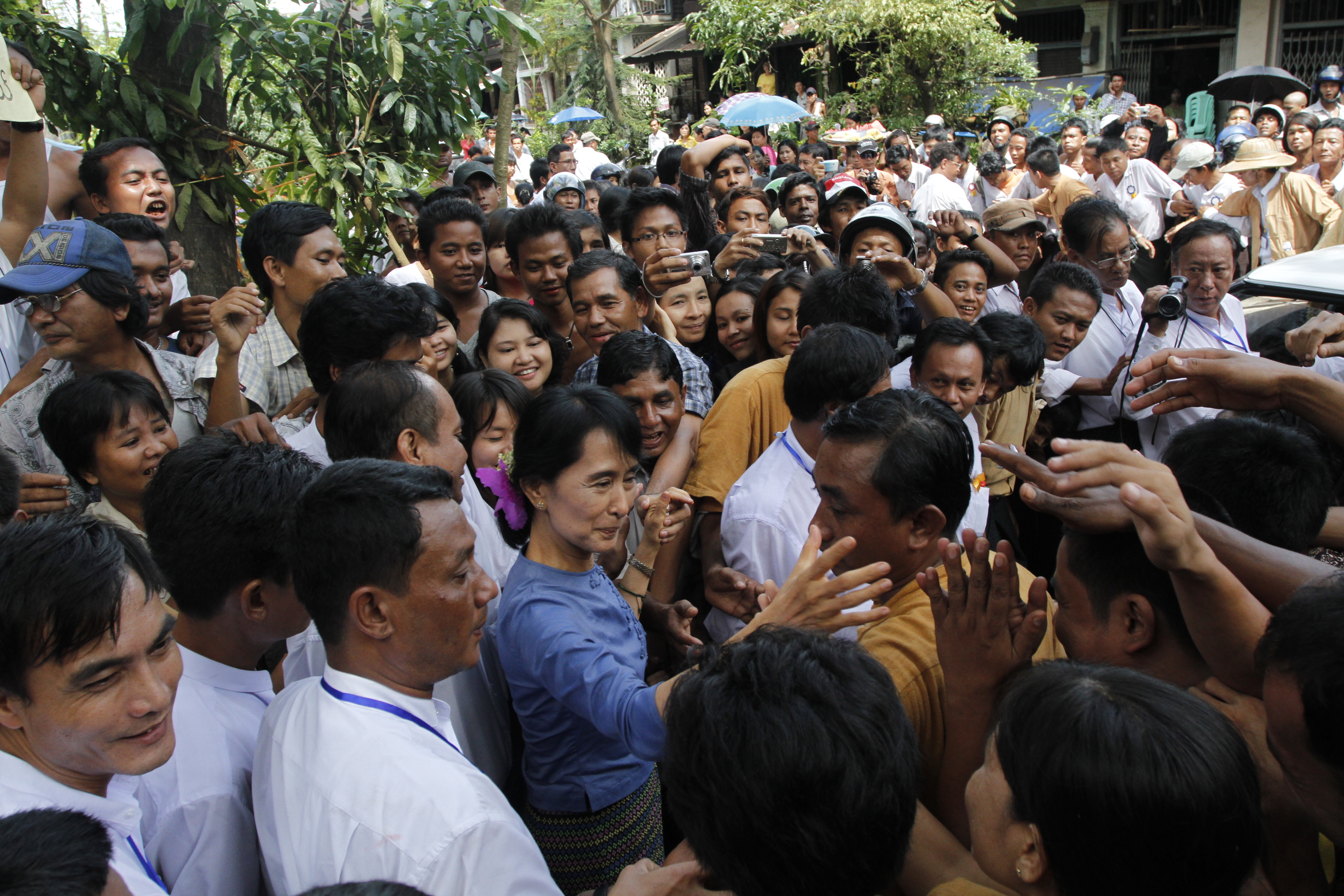
Aung San Suu Kyi greeting supporters from Bago State in 2011

Aung San Suu Kyi has received vocal support from Western nations in Europe, Australia and North and South America, as well as India, Israel, Japan, the Philippines, and South Korea. In December 2007, the US House of Representatives voted unanimously to award her the Congressional Gold Medal; the Senate concurred on 25 April 2008. On 6 May 2008, President George W. Bush signed legislation awarding Aung San Suu Kyi the Congressional Gold Medal. She is the first person to receive the prize while imprisoned. More recently, there has been growing criticism of her detention by Burma's neighbours in the Association of Southeast Asian Nations (ASEAN), particularly Indonesia, Thailand, the Philippines and Singapore. At one point Malaysia warned Burma that it faced expulsion from ASEAN as a result of the detention of Aung San Suu Kyi. Other nations including South Africa, Bangladesh and the Maldives also called for her release. The United Nations has urged the country to move towards inclusive national reconciliation, the restoration of democracy, and full respect for human rights. In December 2008, the United Nations General Assembly passed a resolution condemning the human rights situation in Burma and calling for Aung San Suu Kyi's release—80 countries voting for the resolution, 25 against and 45 abstentions. Other nations, such as China and Russia, are less critical of the regime and prefer to cooperate only on economic matters. Indonesia has urged China to push Burma for reforms. However, Samak Sundaravej, former Prime Minister of Thailand, criticised the amount of support for Aung San Suu Kyi, saying that "Europe uses Aung San Suu Kyi as a tool. If it's not related to Aung San Suu Kyi, you can have deeper discussions with Myanmar."

Vietnam, however, did not support calls by other ASEAN member states for Myanmar to free Aung San Suu Kyi, state media reported Friday, 14 August 2009. The state-run Việt Nam News said Vietnam had no criticism of Myanmar's decision 11 August 2009 to place Aung San Suu Kyi under house arrest for the next 18 months, effectively barring her from elections scheduled for 2010. "It is our view that the Aung San Suu Kyi trial is an internal affair of Myanmar", Vietnamese government spokesman Le Dung stated on the website of the Ministry of Foreign Affairs. In contrast with other ASEAN member states, Dung said Vietnam has always supported Myanmar and hopes it will continue to implement the "roadmap to democracy" outlined by its government.

Nobel Peace Prize winners (Archbishop Desmond Tutu, the Dalai Lama, Shirin Ebadi, Adolfo Pérez Esquivel, Mairead Corrigan, Rigoberta Menchú, Prof. Elie Wiesel, US President Barack Obama, Betty Williams, Jody Williams and former US President Jimmy Carter) called for the rulers of Burma to release Aung San Suu Kyi to "create the necessary conditions for a genuine dialogue with Daw Aung San Suu Kyi and all concerned parties and ethnic groups to achieve an inclusive national reconciliation with the direct support of the United Nations". Some of the money she received as part of the award helped fund higher education grants to Burmese students through the London-based charity Prospect Burma.

It was announced before the 2010 Burmese general election that Aung San Suu Kyi may be released "so she can organize her party", However, Aung San Suu Kyi was not allowed to run. On 1 October 2010 the government announced that she would be released on 13 November 2010.

US President Barack Obama personally advocated the release of all political prisoners, especially Aung San Suu Kyi, during the US-ASEAN Summit of 2009.

The US Government hoped that successful general elections would be an optimistic indicator of the Burmese government's sincerity towards eventual democracy. The Hatoyama government which spent 2.82 billion yen in 2008, has promised more Japanese foreign aid to encourage Burma to release Aung San Suu Kyi in time for the elections; and to continue moving towards democracy and the rule of law.

In a personal letter to Aung San Suu Kyi, UK Prime Minister Gordon Brown cautioned the Burmese government of the potential consequences of rigging elections as "condemning Burma to more years of diplomatic isolation and economic stagnation".

Aung San Suu Kyi met with many heads of state and opened a dialog with the Minister of Labor Aung Kyi (not to be confused with Aung San Suu Kyi). She was allowed to meet with senior members of her NLD party at the State House, however these meetings took place under close supervision.

=== 2010 release ===
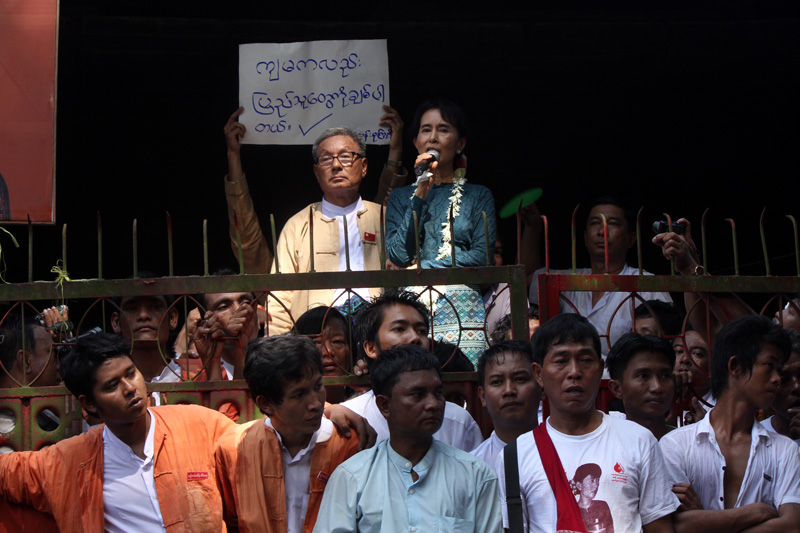
Aung San Suu Kyi addressing crowds at the NLD headquarters shortly after her release

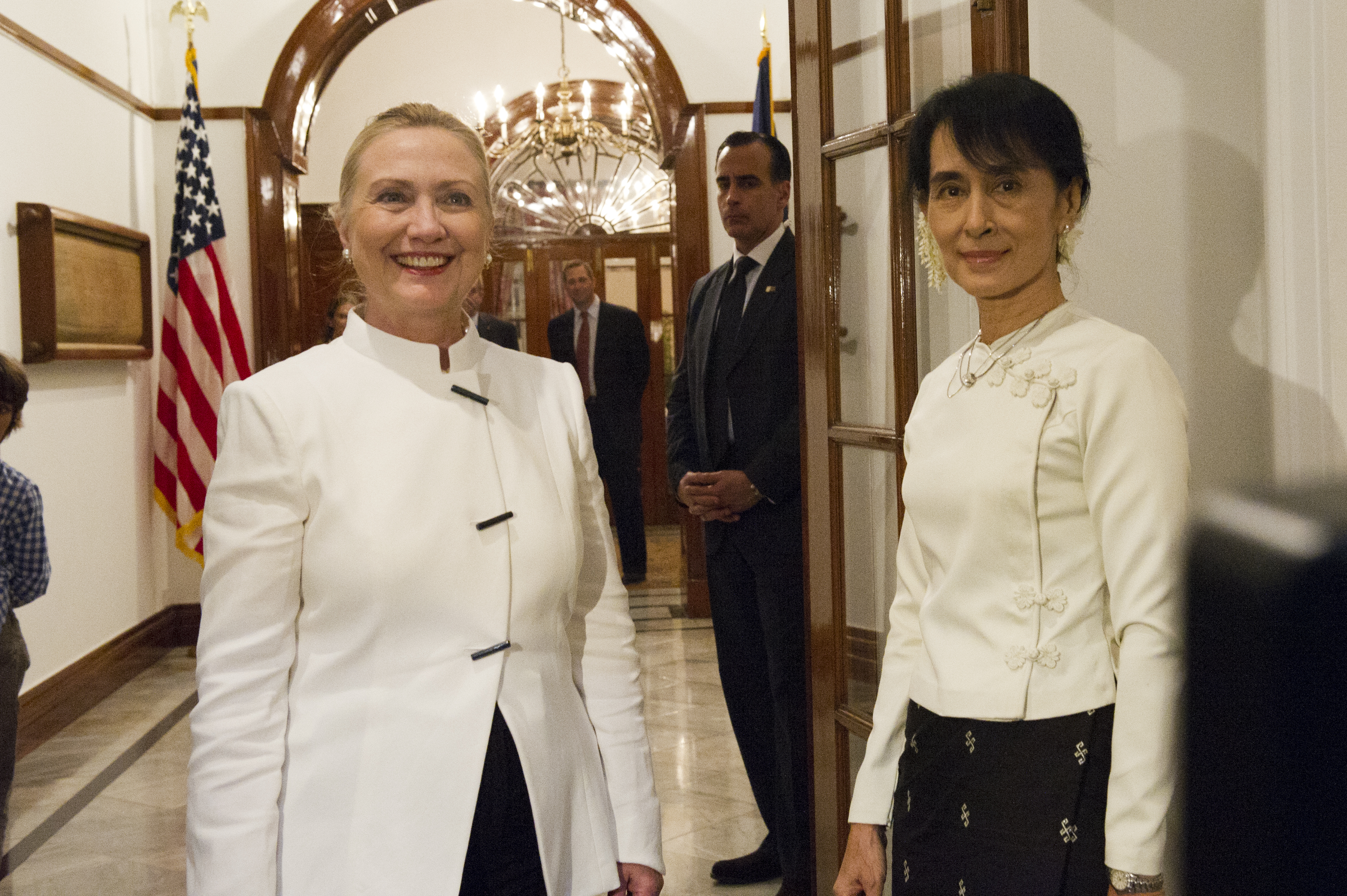
Aung San Suu Kyi meeting with US Secretary of State Hillary Rodham Clinton in Yangon, December 2011

On the evening of 13 November 2010, Aung San Suu Kyi was released from house arrest. This was the date her detention had been set to expire according to a court ruling in August 2009 and came six days after a widely criticised general election. She appeared in front of a crowd of her supporters, who rushed to her house in Rangoon when nearby barricades were removed by the security forces. Aung San Suu Kyi had been detained for 15 of the past 21 years. The government newspaper New Light of Myanmar reported the release positively, saying she had been granted a pardon after serving her sentence "in good conduct". The New York Times suggested that the military government may have released Aung San Suu Kyi because it felt it was in a confident position to control her supporters after the election. Her son Kim Aris was granted a visa in November 2010 to see his mother shortly after her release, for the first time in 10 years. He visited again on 5 July 2011, to accompany her on a trip to Bagan, her first trip outside Yangon since 2003. Her son visited again on 8 August 2011, to accompany her on a trip to Pegu, her second trip.

Discussions were held between Aung San Suu Kyi and the Burmese government during 2011, which led to several official gestures to meet her demands. In October, around a tenth of Burma's political prisoners were freed in an amnesty and trade unions were legalised.

In November 2011, following a meeting of its leaders, the NLD announced its intention to re-register as a political party to contest 48 by-elections necessitated by the promotion of parliamentarians to ministerial rank. Following the decision, Aung San Suu Kyi held a telephone conference with US President Barack Obama, in which it was agreed that Secretary of State Hillary Clinton would visit Burma, a move received with caution by Burma's ally China. On 1 December 2011, Aung San Suu Kyi met with Hillary Clinton at the residence of the top-ranking US diplomat in Yangon.

On 21 December 2011, Thai Prime Minister Yingluck Shinawatra met Aung San Suu Kyi in Yangon, marking Aung San Suu Kyi's "first-ever meeting with the leader of a foreign country".

On 5 January 2012, British Foreign Minister William Hague met Aung San Suu Kyi and his Burmese counterpart. This represented a significant visit for Aung San Suu Kyi and Burma. Aung San Suu Kyi studied in the UK and maintains many ties there, whilst Britain is Burma's largest bilateral donor. During Aung San Suu Kyi's visit to Europe, she visited the Swiss parliament, collected her 1991 Nobel Prize in Oslo and her honorary degree from the University of Oxford.

=== 2012 by-elections ===
In December 2011, there was speculation that Aung San Suu Kyi would run in the 2012 national by-elections to fill vacant seats. On 18 January 2012, Aung San Suu Kyi formally registered to contest a Pyithu Hluttaw (lower house) seat in the Kawhmu Township constituency in special parliamentary elections to be held on 1 April 2012. The seat was previously held by Soe Tint, who vacated it after being appointed Construction Deputy Minister, in the 2010 election. She ran against Union Solidarity and Development Party candidate Soe Min, a retired army physician and native of Twante Township.

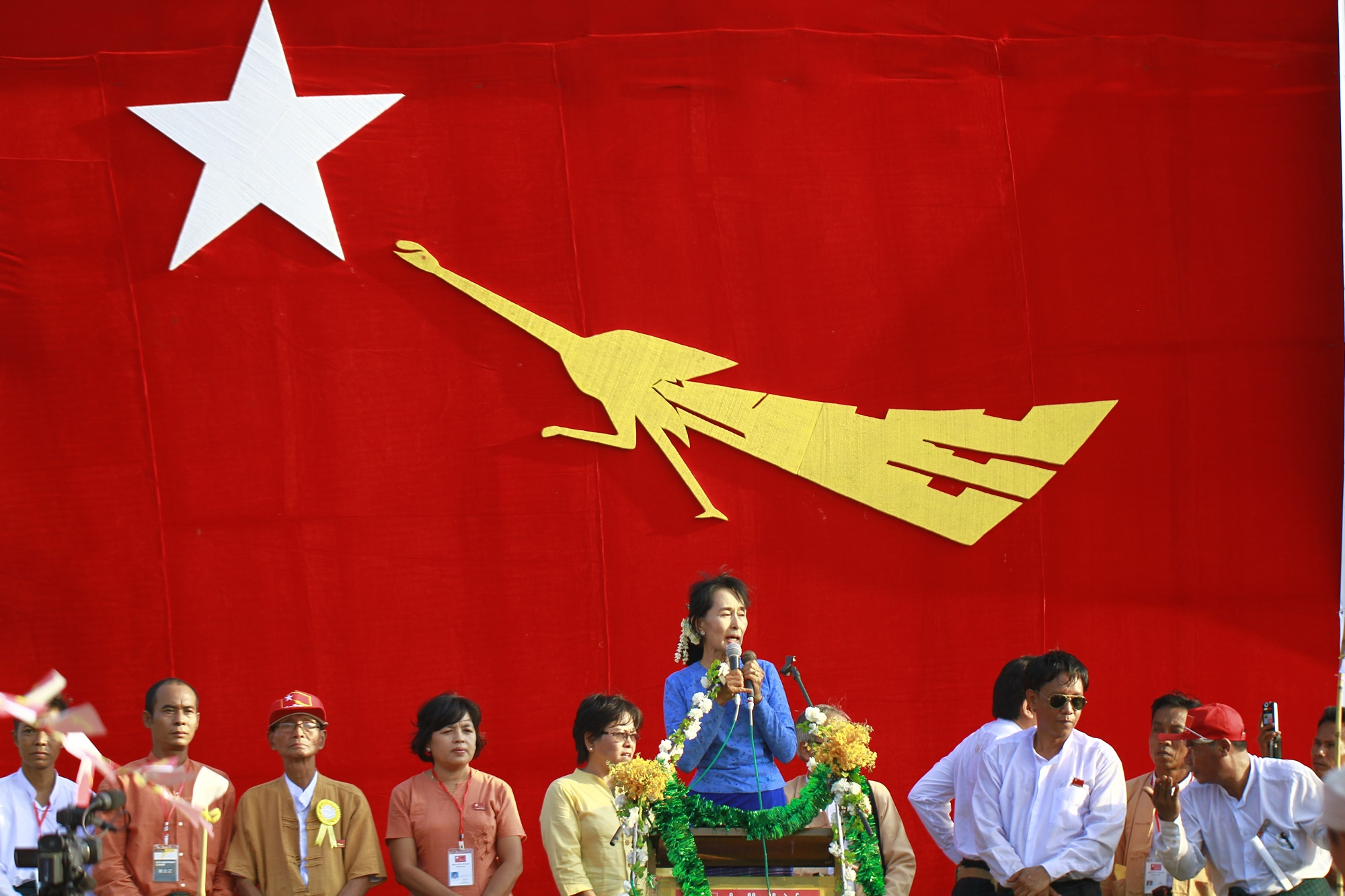
Aung San Suu Kyi (centre) giving a speech to the supporters during the 2012 by-election campaign at her constituency Kawhmu township, Myanmar on 22 March 2012

On 3 March 2012, at a large campaign rally in Mandalay, Aung San Suu Kyi unexpectedly left after 15 minutes, because of exhaustion and airsickness.

In an official campaign speech broadcast on Burmese state television's MRTV on 14 March 2012, Aung San Suu Kyi publicly campaigned for reform of the 2008 Constitution, removal of restrictive laws, more adequate protections for people's democratic rights, and establishment of an independent judiciary. The speech was leaked online a day before it was broadcast. A paragraph in the speech, focusing on the Tatmadaw's repression by means of law, was censored by authorities.

Aung San Suu Kyi also called for international media to monitor the by-elections, while publicly pointing out irregularities in official voter lists, which include deceased individuals and exclude other eligible voters in the contested constituencies. On 21 March 2012, Aung San Suu Kyi was quoted as saying "Fraud and rule violations are continuing and we can even say they are increasing."

When asked whether she would assume a ministerial post if given the opportunity, she said the following:

I can tell you one thing—that under the present constitution, if you become a member of the government, you have to vacate your seat in the national assembly. And I am not working so hard to get into parliament simply to vacate my seat.

On 26 March 2012, Aung San Suu Kyi suspended her nationwide campaign tour early, after a campaign rally in Myeik (Mergui), a coastal town in the south, citing health problems due to exhaustion and hot weather.

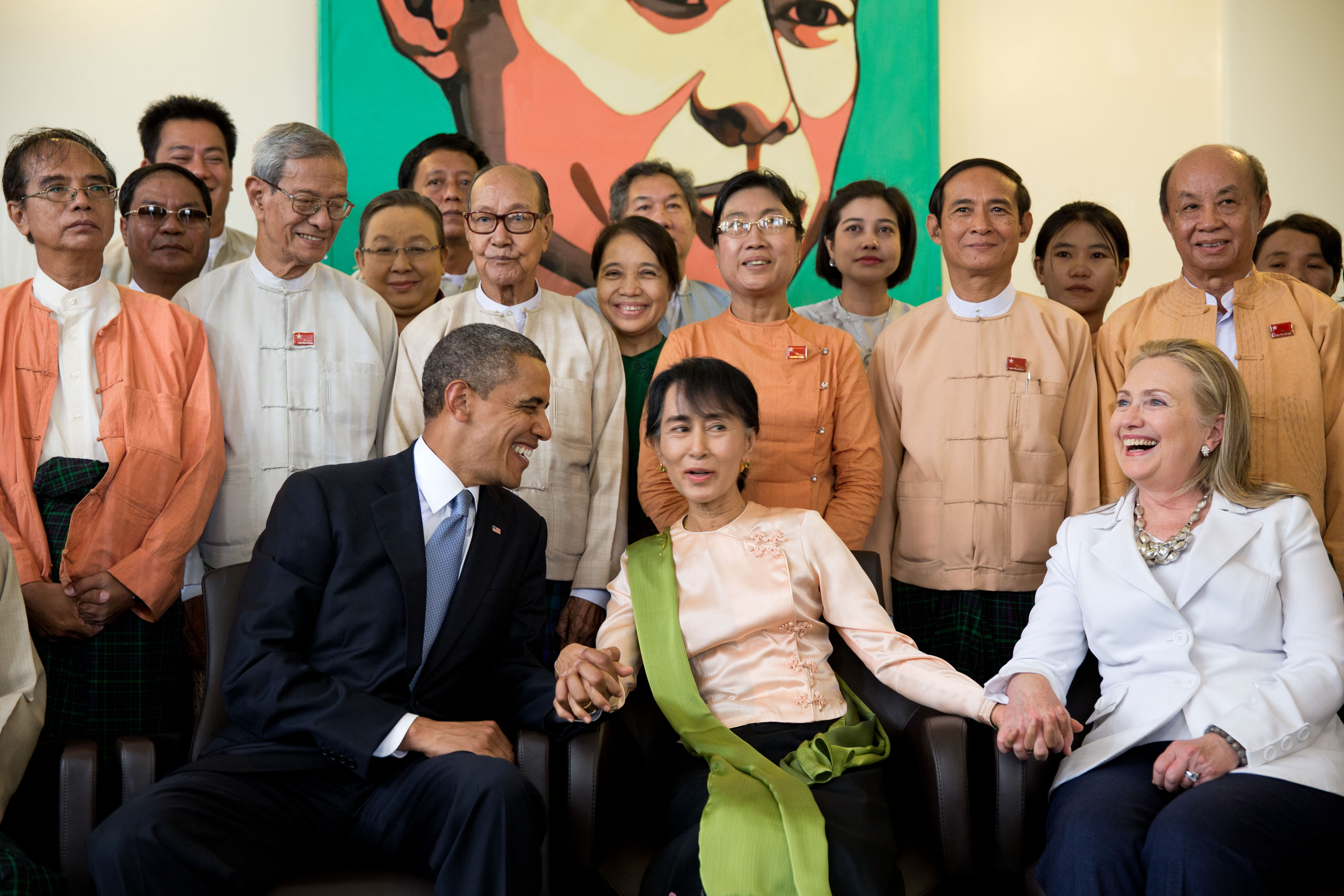
US President Barack Obama and Secretary of State Hillary Clinton with Aung San Suu Kyi and her staff at her home in Yangon, 2012

On 1 April 2012, the NLD announced that Aung San Suu Kyi had won the vote for a seat in Parliament. A news broadcast on state-run MRTV, reading the announcements of the Union Election Commission, confirmed her victory, as well as her party's victory in 43 of the 45 contested seats, officially making Aung San Suu Kyi the Leader of the Opposition in the Pyidaungsu Hluttaw.

Although she and other MP-elects were expected to take office on 23 April when the Hluttaws resumed session, National League for Democracy MP-elects, including Aung San Suu Kyi, said they might not take their oaths because of its wording; in its present form, parliamentarians must vow to "safeguard" the constitution. In an address on Radio Free Asia, she said, "We don't mean we will not attend the parliament, we mean we will attend only after taking the oath... Changing that wording in the oath is also in conformity with the Constitution. I don't expect there will be any difficulty in doing it."

On 2 May 2012, National League for Democracy MP-elects, including Aung San Suu Kyi, took their oaths and took office, though the wording of the oath was not changed. According to the Los Angeles Times, "Suu Kyi and her colleagues decided they could do more by joining as lawmakers than maintaining their boycott on principle." On 9 July 2012, she attended Parliament for the first time as a lawmaker.

=== 2015 general election ===
On 16 June 2012, Aung San Suu Kyi was finally able to deliver her Nobel acceptance speech (Nobel lecture) at Oslo's City Hall, two decades after being awarded the peace prize. In September 2012, Aung San Suu Kyi received in person the United States Congressional Gold Medal, which is the highest Congressional award. Although she was awarded this medal in 2008, at the time, she was under house arrest and was unable to receive the medal. Aung San Suu Kyi was greeted with bipartisan support at Congress, as part of a coast-to-coast tour in the United States. In addition, Aung San Suu Kyi met President Barack Obama at the White House. The experience was described by Aung San Suu Kyi as "one of the most moving days of my life". In 2014, she was listed as the 61st-most-powerful woman in the world by Forbes.

Aung San Suu Kyi meeting Barack Obama at the White House in September 2012

On 6 July 2012, Aung San Suu Kyi announced on the World Economic Forum's website that she wanted to run for the presidency in Myanmar's 2015 elections. The current Constitution, which came into effect in 2008, bars her from the presidency because she is the widow and mother of foreigners—provisions that appeared to be written specifically to prevent her from being eligible.

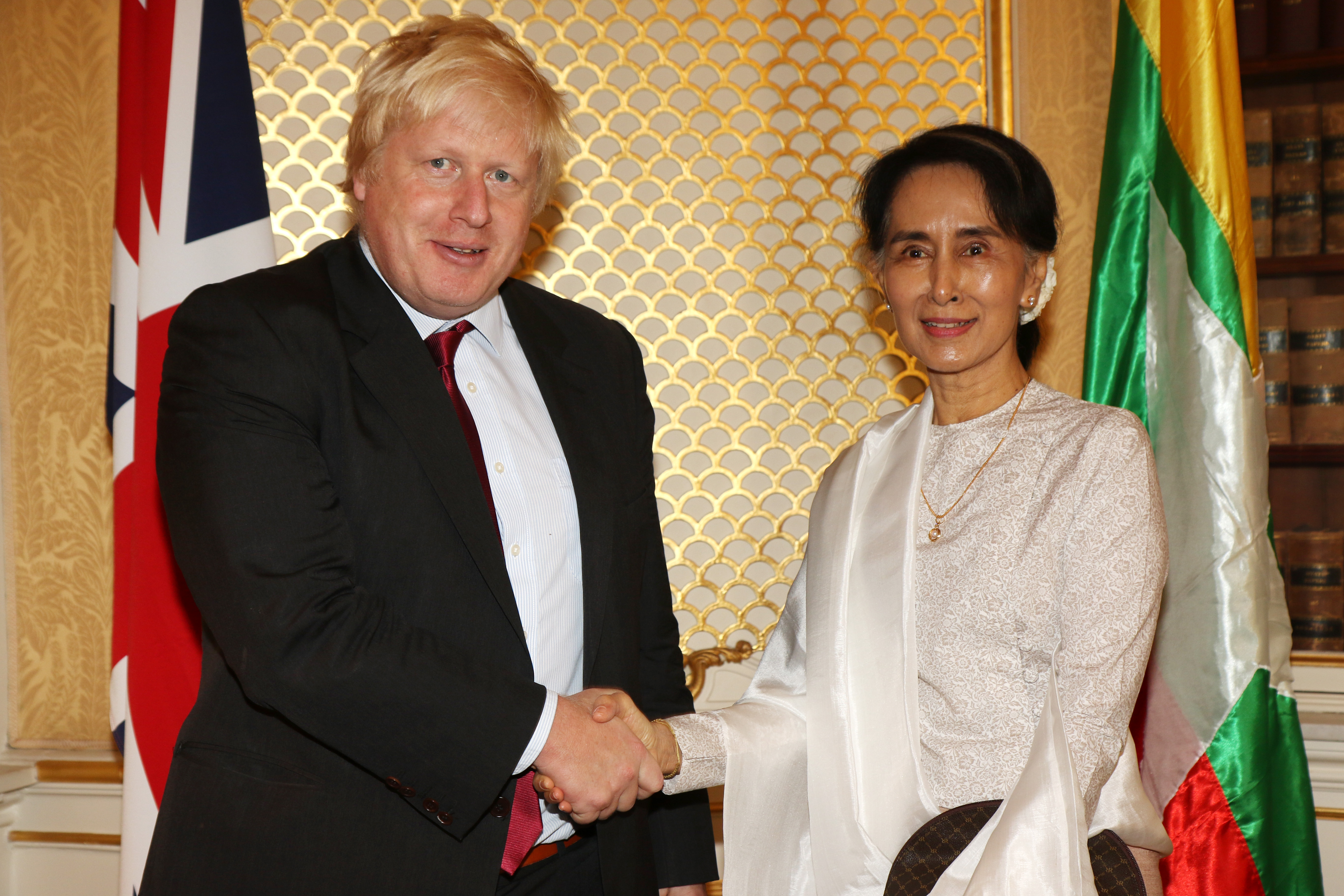
Foreign Secretary Boris Johnson meeting Aung San Suu Kyi in London, 12 September 2016

The NLD won a sweeping victory in those elections, winning at least 255 seats in the House of Representatives and 135 seats in the House of Nationalities. In addition, Aung San Suu Kyi won re-election to the House of Representatives. Under the 2008 constitution, the NLD needed to win at least a two-thirds majority in both houses to ensure that its candidate would become president. Before the elections, Aung San Suu Kyi announced that even though she is constitutionally barred from the presidency, she would hold the real power in any NLD-led government. On 30 March 2016, she became Minister for the President's Office, for Foreign Affairs, for Education and for Electric Power and Energy in President Htin Kyaw's government; later she relinquished the latter two ministries and President Htin Kyaw appointed her State Counsellor, a position akin to a Prime Minister created especially for her. The position of State Counsellor was approved by the House of Nationalities on 1 April 2016 and the House of Representatives on 5 April 2016. The next day, her role as State Counsellor was established.

=== State counsellor and foreign minister (2016–2021) ===
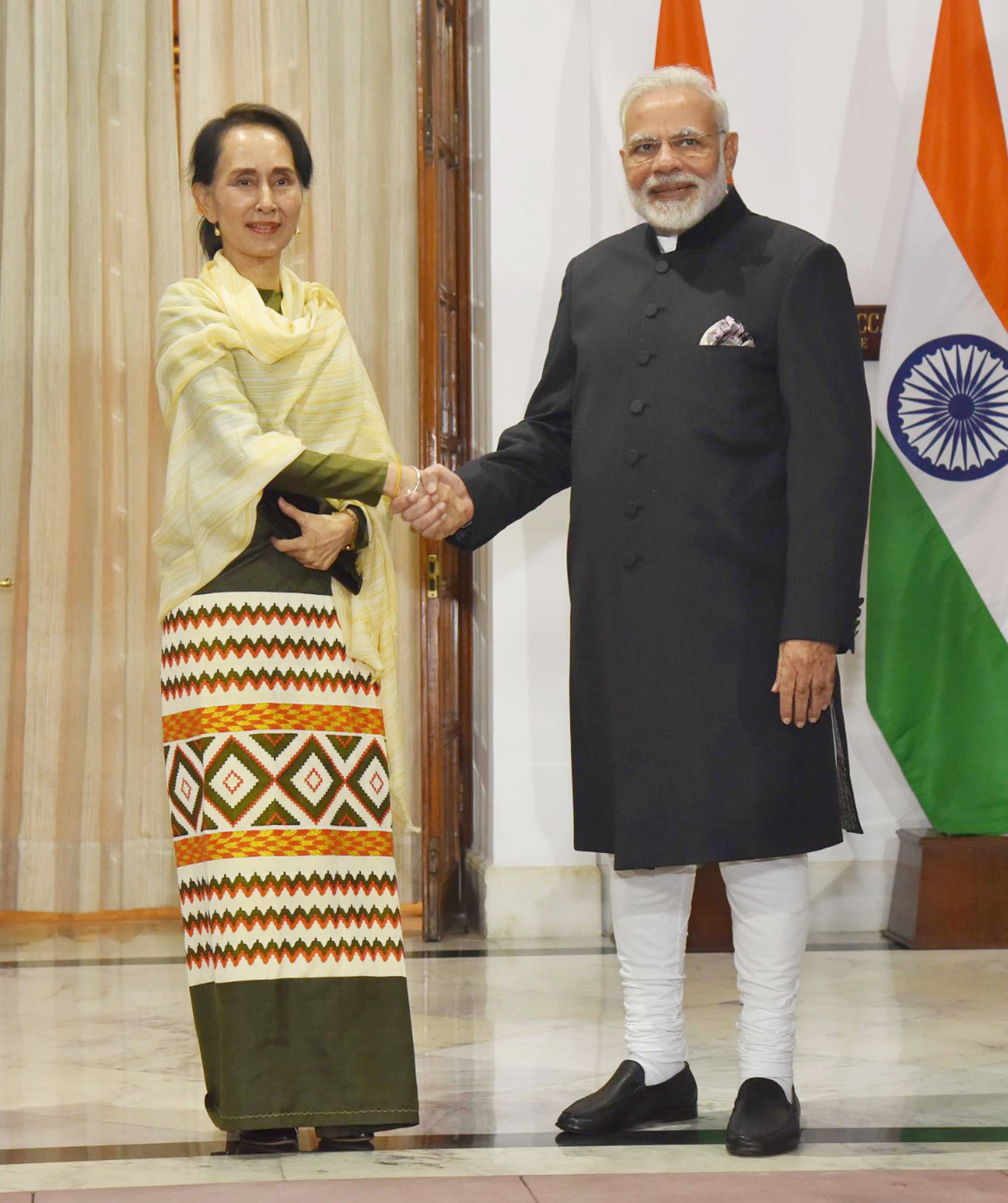
Indian prime minister Narendra Modi meeting Aung San Suu Kyi in New Delhi, 24 January 2018

As soon as she became foreign minister, she invited Chinese Foreign Minister Wang Yi, Canadian Foreign Minister Stephane Dion and Italian Foreign Minister Paolo Gentiloni in April and Japanese Foreign Minister Fumio Kishida in May and discussed how to have good diplomatic relationships with these countries.

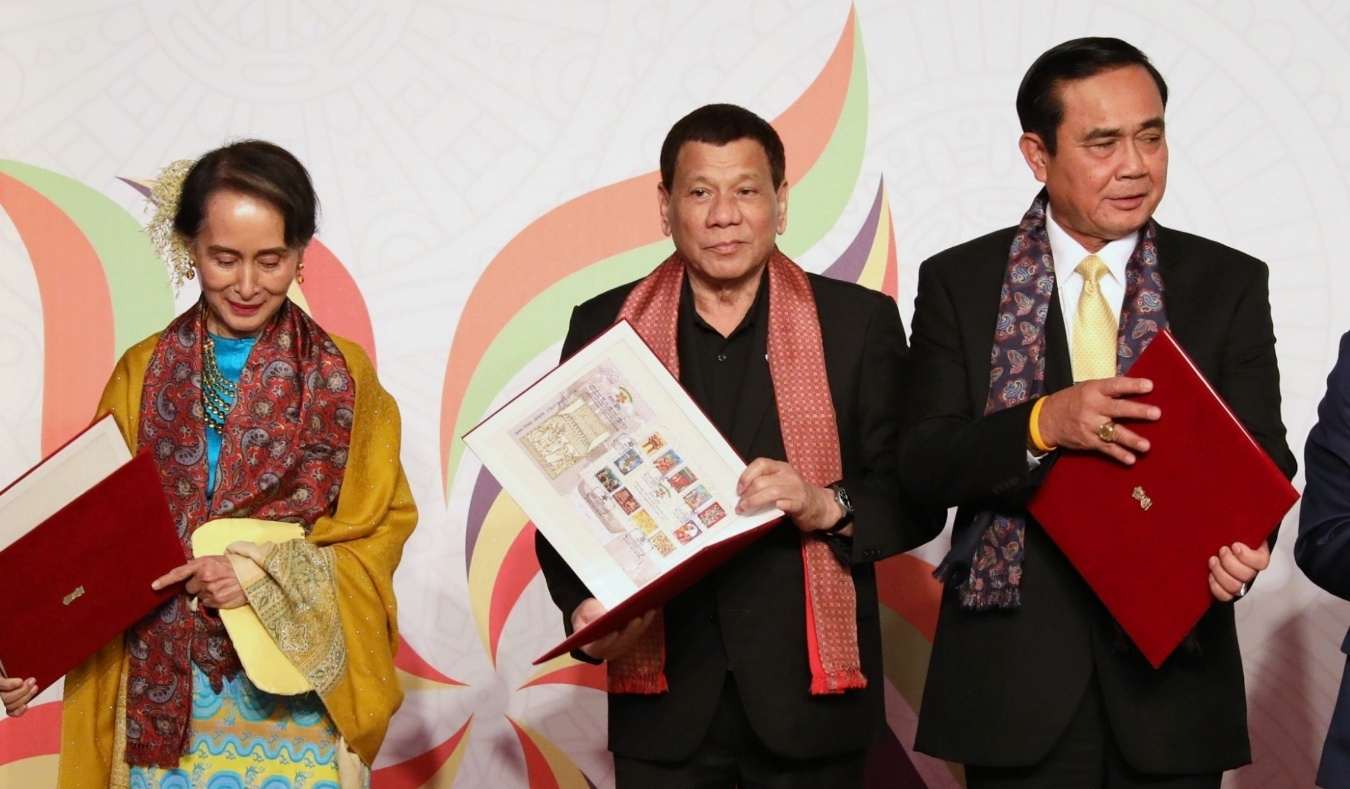
Aung San Suu Kyi with Philippine president Rodrigo Duterte and Thai prime minister Prayut Chan-o-cha, 25 January 2018

Initially, upon accepting the State Counsellor position, she granted amnesty to the students who were arrested for opposing the National Education Bill, and announced the creation of the commission on Rakhine State, which had a long record of persecution of the Muslim Rohingya minority. However, soon Aung San Suu Kyi's government did not manage with the ethnic conflicts in Shan and Kachin states, where thousands of refugees fled to China, and by 2017 the persecution of the Rohingya by the government forces escalated to the point that it is not uncommonly called a genocide. Aung San Suu Kyi, when interviewed, has denied the allegations of ethnic cleansing. She has also refused to grant citizenship to the Rohingya, instead taking steps to issue ID cards for residency but no guarantees of citizenship.

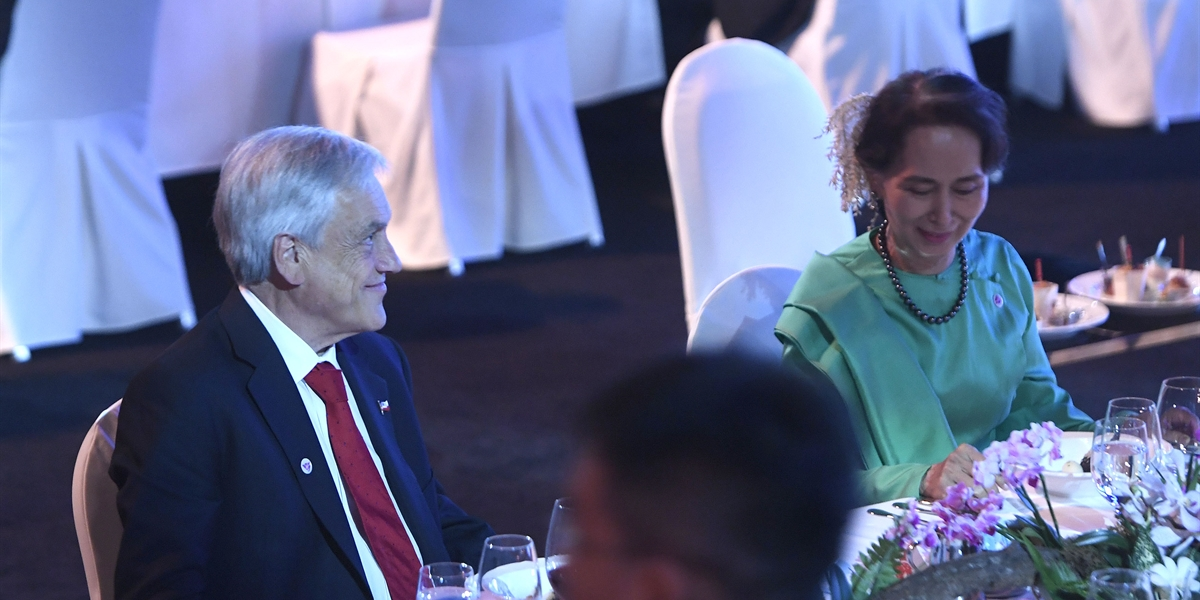
Aung San Suu Kyi with Chilean President Sebastián Piñera, 14 November 2018

Her tenure as State Counsellor of Myanmar has drawn international criticism for her failure to address her country's economic and ethnic problems, particularly the plight of the Rohingya following the 25 August 2017 ARSA attacks (described as "certainly one of the biggest refugee crises and cases of ethnic cleansing since the Second World War"), for the weakening of freedom of the press and for her style of leadership, described as imperious and "distracted and out of touch".

During the COVID-19 pandemic in Myanmar, Suu Kyi chaired a National Central Committee responsible for coordinating the country's pandemic response.

==== Response to the genocide of Rohingya Muslims and refugees ====
In 2017, critics called for Aung San Suu Kyi's Nobel Prize to be revoked, citing her silence over the genocide of Rohingya people in Myanmar. Some activists criticised Aung San Suu Kyi for her silence on the 2012 Rakhine State riots (later repeated during the 2015 Rohingya refugee crisis), and her indifference to the plight of the Rohingya, Myanmar's persecuted Muslim minority. In 2012, she told reporters she did not know if the Rohingya could be regarded as Burmese citizens. In a 2013 interview with the BBC's Mishal Husain, Aung San Suu Kyi did not condemn violence against the Rohingya and denied that Muslims in Myanmar have been subject to ethnic cleansing, insisting that the tensions were due to a "climate of fear" caused by "a worldwide perception that global Muslim power is 'very great'". She did condemn "hate of any kind" in the interview. According to Peter Popham, in the aftermath of the interview, she expressed anger at being interviewed by a Muslim. Husain had challenged Aung San Suu Kyi that almost all of the impact of violence was against the Rohingya, in response to Aung San Suu Kyi's claim that violence was happening on both sides, and Peter Popham described her position on the issue as one of purposeful ambiguity for political gain.

However, she said that she wanted to work towards reconciliation and that she cannot take sides, as violence has been committed by both sides. According to The Economist, her "halo has even slipped among foreign human-rights lobbyists, disappointed at her failure to make a clear stand on behalf of the Rohingya minority". However, she has spoken out "against a ban on Rohingya families near the Bangladeshi border having more than two children".

In a 2015 BBC News article, reporter Jonah Fisher suggested that Aung San Suu Kyi's silence over the Rohingya issue is due to a need to obtain support from the majority Bamar ethnicity as she is in "the middle of a general election campaign". In May 2015, the Dalai Lama publicly called upon her to do more to help the Rohingya in Myanmar, claiming that he had previously urged her to address the plight of the Rohingya in private during two separate meetings and that she had resisted his urging. In May 2016, Aung San Suu Kyi asked the newly appointed United States Ambassador to Myanmar, Scot Marciel, not to refer to the Rohingya by that name as they "are not recognized as among the 135 official ethnic groups" in Myanmar. This followed Bamar protests at Marciel's use of the word "Rohingya".

In 2016, Aung San Suu Kyi was accused of failing to protect Myanmar's Rohingya Muslims during the Rohingya genocide. State crime experts from Queen Mary University of London warned that Aung San Suu Kyi is "legitimising genocide" in Myanmar. Despite continued persecution of the Rohingya well into 2017, Aung San Suu Kyi was "not even admitting, let alone trying to stop, the army's well-documented campaign of rape, murder and destruction against Rohingya villages". On 4 September 2017, Yanghee Lee, the UN's special rapporteur on human rights in Myanmar, criticised Aung San Suu Kyi's response to the "really grave" situation in Rakhine, saying: "The de facto leader needs to step in—that is what we would expect from any government, to protect everybody within their own jurisdiction." The BBC reported that "Her comments came as the number of Rohingya fleeing to Bangladesh reached 87,000, according to UN estimates", adding that "her sentiments were echoed by Nobel Peace laureate Malala Yousafzai, who said she was waiting to hear from Ms Suu Kyi—who has not commented on the crisis since it erupted". The next day George Monbiot, writing in The Guardian, called on readers to sign a change.org petition to have the Nobel peace prize revoked, criticising her silence on the matter and asserting "whether out of prejudice or out of fear, she denies to others the freedoms she rightly claimed for herself. Her regime excludes—and in some cases seeks to silence—the very activists who helped to ensure her own rights were recognised." The Nobel Foundation replied that there existed no provision for revoking a Nobel Prize. Archbishop Desmond Tutu, a fellow peace prize holder, also criticised Aung San Suu Kyi's silence: in an open letter published on social media, he said: "If the political price of your ascension to the highest office in Myanmar is your silence, the price is surely too steep... It is incongruous for a symbol of righteousness to lead such a country." On 13 September it was revealed that Aung San Suu Kyi would not be attending a UN General Assembly debate being held the following week to discuss the humanitarian crisis, with a Myanmar's government spokesman stating "perhaps she has more pressing matters to deal with".

In October 2017, Oxford City Council announced that, following a unanimous cross-party vote, the honour of Freedom of the City, granted in 1997 in recognition of her "long struggle for democracy", was to be withdrawn following evidence emerging from the United Nations which meant that she was "no longer worthy of the honour". A few days later, Munsur Ali, a councillor for City of London Corporation, tabled a motion to rescind the Freedom of the City of London: the motion was supported by Catherine McGuinness, chair of the corporation's policy and resources committee, who expressed "distress... at the situation in Burma and the atrocities committed by the Burmese military". On 13 November 2017, Bob Geldof returned his Freedom of the City of Dublin award in protest over Aung San Suu Kyi also holding the accolade, stating that he does not "wish to be associated in any way with an individual currently engaged in the mass ethnic cleansing of the Rohingya people of north-west Burma". Calling Aung San Suu Kyi a "handmaiden to genocide", Geldof added that he would take pride in his award being restored if it is first stripped from her. The Dublin City Council voted 59–2 (with one abstention) to revoke Aung San Suu Kyi's Freedom of the City award over Myanmar's treatment of the Rohingya people in December 2017, though Lord Mayor of Dublin Mícheál Mac Donncha denied the decision was influenced by protests by Geldof and members of U2. At the same meeting, the Councillors voted 37–7 (with 5 abstentions) to remove Geldof's name from the Roll of Honorary Freemen.

In March 2018, the United States Holocaust Memorial Museum revoked Aung San Suu Kyi's Elie Wiesel Award, awarded in 2012, citing her failure "to condemn and stop the military's brutal campaign" against Rohingya Muslims.

In May 2018, Aung San Suu Kyi was considered complicit in the crimes against Rohingyas in a report by Britain's International Development Committee.

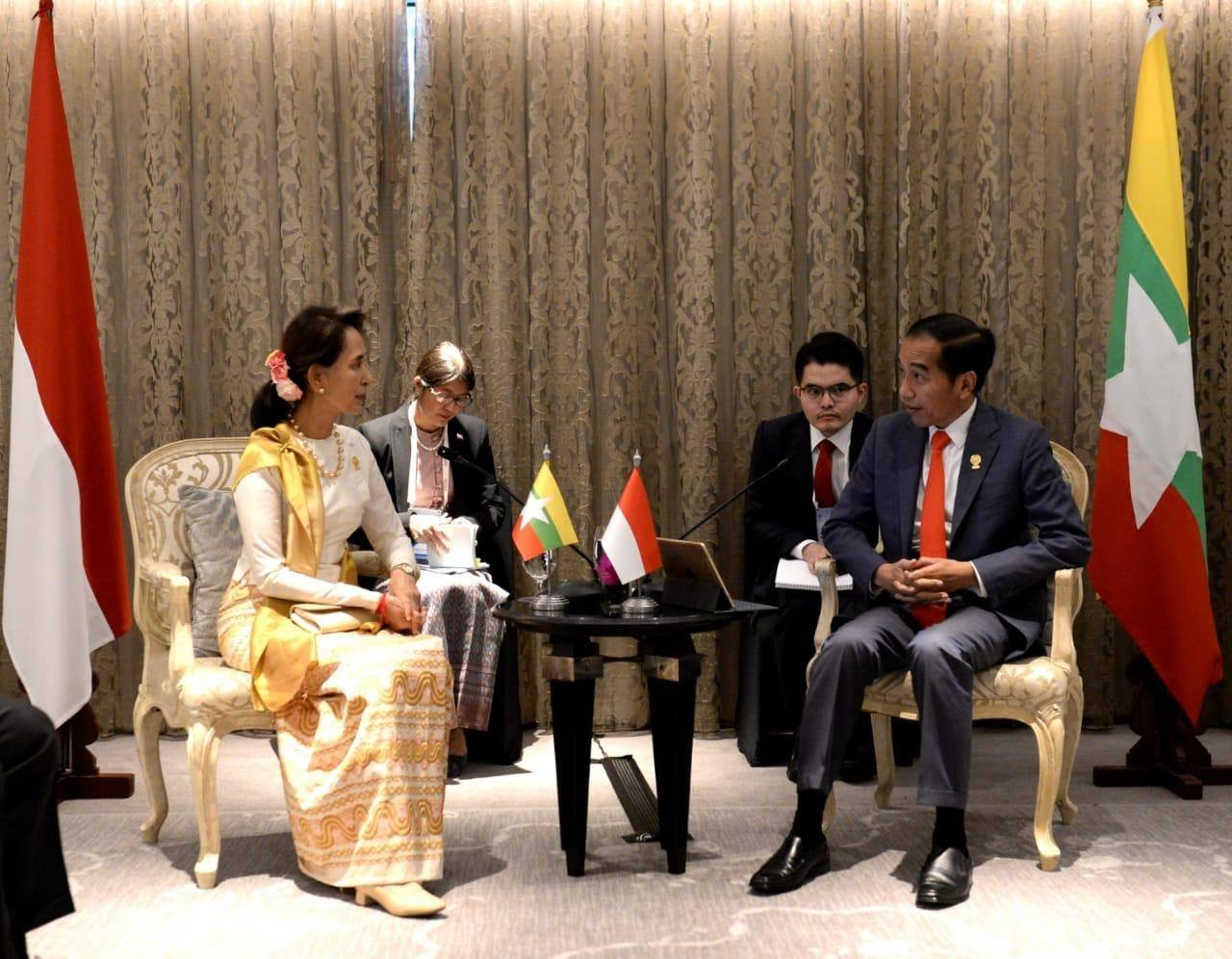
Aung San Suu Kyi with Indonesian President Joko Widodo, 22 June 2019

In August 2018, it was revealed that Aung San Suu Kyi would be stripped of her Freedom of Edinburgh award over her refusal to speak out against the crimes committed against the Rohingya. She had received the award in 2005 for promoting peace and democracy in Burma. This will be only the second time that anyone has ever been stripped of the award, after Charles Stewart Parnell lost it in 1890 owing to a salacious affair. Also in August, a UN report, while describing the violence as genocide, added that Aung San Suu Kyi did as little as possible to prevent it.

In early October 2018, both the Canadian Senate and its House of Commons voted unanimously to strip Aung San Suu Kyi of her honorary citizenship. This decision was caused by the Government of Canada's determination that the treatment of the Rohingya by Myanmar's government amounts to genocide.

On 11 November 2018, Amnesty International announced it was revoking her Ambassador of Conscience award. In December 2019, Aung San Suu Kyi appeared in the International Court of Justice at The Hague where she defended the Burmese military against allegations of genocide against the Rohingya. In a speech of more than 3,000 words, Aung San Suu Kyi did not use the term "Rohingya" in describing the ethnic group. She stated that the allegations of genocide were "incomplete and misleading", claiming that the situation was actually a Burmese military response to attacks by the Arakan Rohingya Salvation Army (ARSA). She also questioned how there could be "genocidal intent" when the Burmese government had opened investigations and also encouraged Rohingya to return after being displaced. However, experts have largely criticised the Burmese investigations as insincere, with the military declaring itself innocent and the government preventing a visit from investigators from the United Nations. Many Rohingya have also not returned owing to perceiving danger and a lack of rights in Myanmar.

In January 2020, the International Court of Justice decided that there was a "real and imminent risk of irreparable prejudice to the rights" of the Rohingya. The court also took the view that the Burmese government's efforts to remedy the situation "do not appear sufficient" to protect the Rohingya. Therefore, the court ordered the Burmese government to take "all measures within its power" to protect the Rohingya from genocidal actions. The court also instructed the Myanmar government to preserve evidence and report back to the court at timely intervals about the situation.

On 14 February 2025, a court in Argentina, acting on a petition from the Burmese Rohingya Organisation UK and citing universal jurisdiction, issued arrest warrants against several officials in Myanmar, including Aung San Suu Kyi on charges of "genocide and crimes against humanity" against the Rohingyas.

==== Arrests and prosecution of journalists ====
In December 2017, two Reuters journalists, Wa Lone and Kyaw Soe Oo, were arrested while investigating the Inn Din massacre of Rohingyas. Suu Kyi publicly commented in June 2018 that the journalists "weren't arrested for covering the Rakhine issue", but because they had broken Myanmar's Official Secrets Act. As the journalists were then on trial for violating the Official Secrets Act, Aung San Suu Kyi's presumption of their guilt was criticised by rights groups for potentially influencing the verdict. American diplomat Bill Richardson said that he had privately discussed the arrest with Suu Kyi, and that Aung San Suu Kyi reacted angrily and labelled the journalists "traitors". A police officer testified that he was ordered by superiors to use entrapment to frame and arrest the journalists; he was later jailed and his family evicted from their home in the police camp. The judge found the journalists guilty in September 2018 and to be jailed for seven years. Aung San Suu Kyi reacted to widespread international criticism of the verdict by stating: "I don't think anyone has bothered to read" the judgement as it had "nothing to do with freedom of expression at all", but the Official Secrets Act. She also challenged critics to "point out where there has been a miscarriage of justice", and told the two Reuters journalists that they could appeal their case to a higher court.

In September 2018, the Office of the United Nations High Commissioner for Human Rights issued a report that since Aung San Suu Kyi's party, the NLD, came to power, the arrests and criminal prosecutions of journalists in Myanmar by the government and military, under laws which are too vague and broad, have "made it impossible for journalists to do their job without fear or favour."

=== 2021 arrest ===
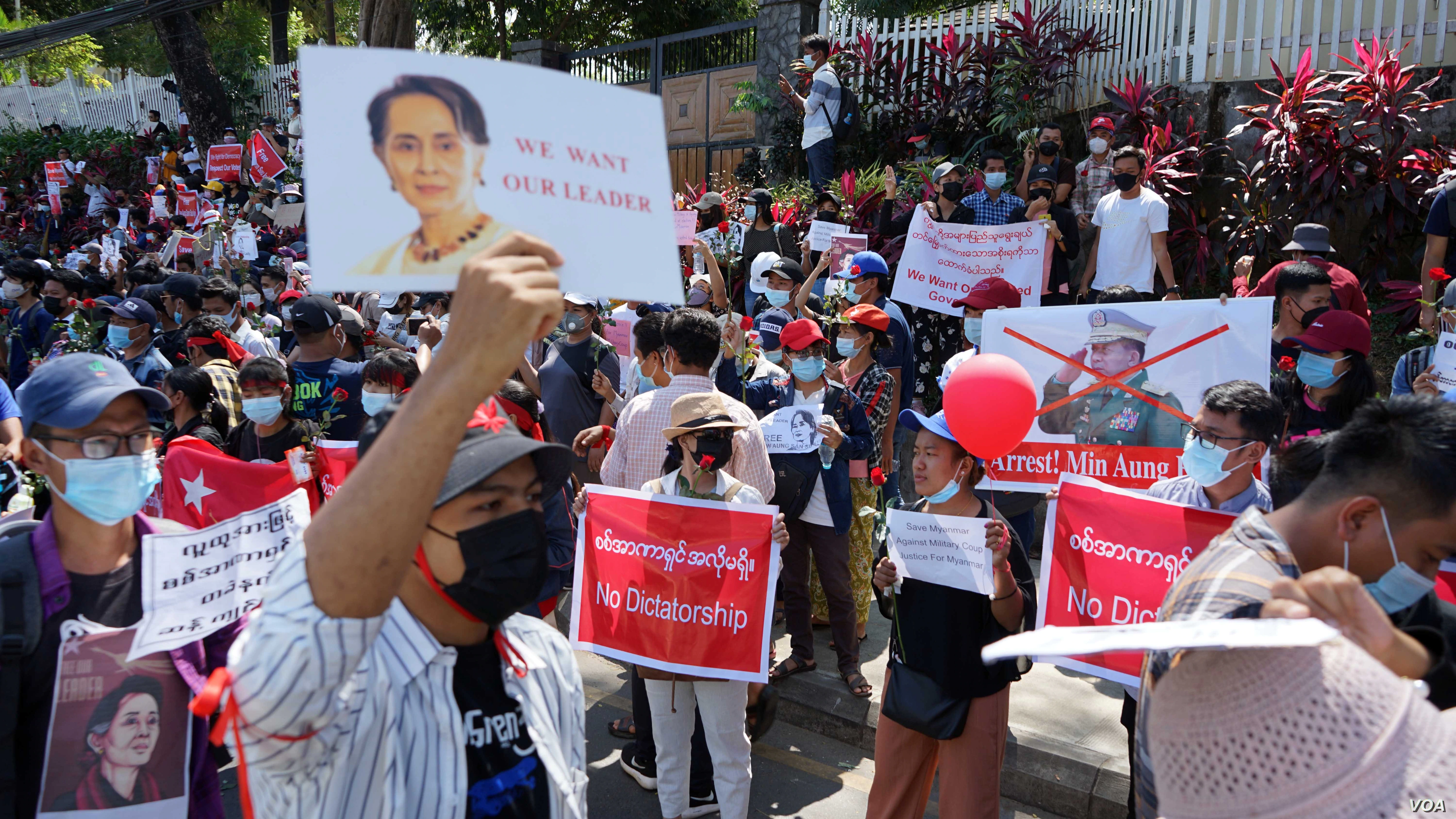
Protesters holding posters with the image of Aung San Suu Kyi during a demonstration against the military coup

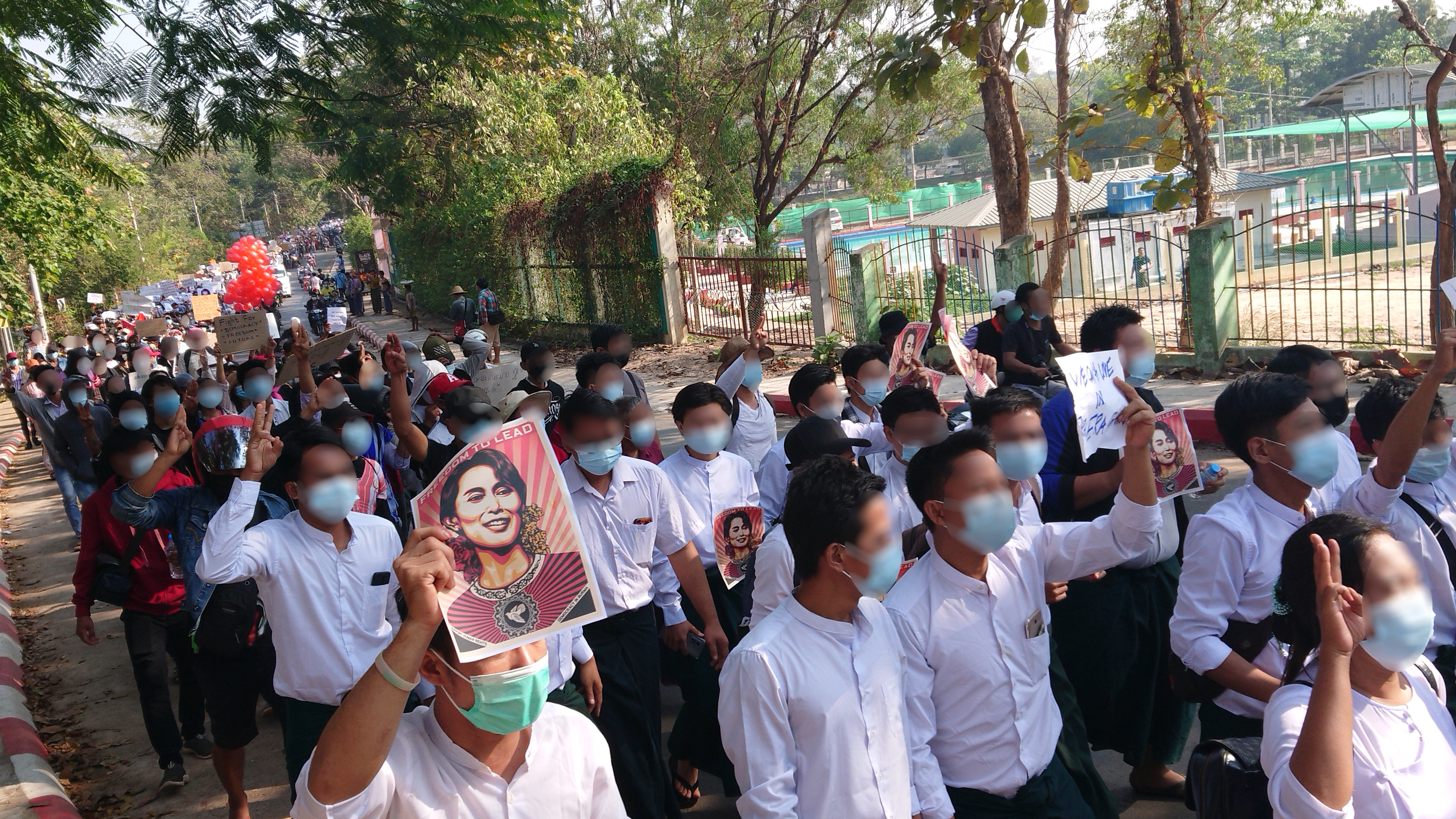
Protesting teachers holding portraits of Aung San Suu Kyi

On 1 February 2021, Aung San Suu Kyi was arrested and deposed by Myanmar's military, along with other leaders of her National League for Democracy (NLD) party, after Myanmar's military declared the November 2020 general election results fraudulent. A 1 February court order authorised her detainment for 15 days, stating that soldiers searching her Naypyidaw villa had uncovered imported communications equipment lacking proper paperwork. Aung San Suu Kyi was transferred to house arrest on the same evening, and on 3 February was formally charged with illegally importing ten or more walkie-talkies. She faces up to three years in prison for the charges. According to The New York Times, the charge "echoed previous accusations of esoteric legal crimes (and) arcane offenses" used by the military against critics and rivals.

US President Joe Biden raised the threat of new sanctions as a result of the Myanmar's military coup.

On 1 April 2021, Aung San Suu Kyi was charged with the fifth offence in relation to violating the Official Secrets Act. According to her lawyer, it was the most serious charge brought against her after the coup and could have carried a sentence of up to 14 years in prison if convicted. On 12 April 2021, Aung San Suu Kyi was hit with another charge, this time "under section 25 of the natural disaster management law". According to her lawyer, it is her sixth indictment. She appeared in court via video link and faced five charges in the capital Naypyidaw and one in Yangon.

On 28 April 2021, the National Unity Government (NUG), in which Aung San Suu Kyi symbolically retained her position, anticipated that there would be no talks with the junta until all political prisoners, including her, are set free. This move by her supporters comes after an ASEAN-supported consensus with the junta leadership in the past days. However, on 8 May 2021, the junta designated NUG as a terrorist organisation and warned citizens not to cooperate, nor to give aid to the parallel government, stripping Aung San Suu Kyi of her symbolic position. On 10 May 2021, her lawyer said she would appear in court in person for the first time since her arrest after the Supreme Court ruled that she could attend in person and meet her lawyers. She had been previously only allowed to do so remotely from her home. On 21 May 2021, a military junta commission was formed to dissolve Aung San Suu Kyi's National League for Democracy (NLD) on grounds of election fraud in the November 2020 election. On 22 May 2021, during his first interview since the coup, junta leader Min Aung Hlaing reported that she was in good health at her home and that she would appear in court in a matter of days. On 23 May 2021, the European Union expressed support for Aung San Suu Kyi's party and condemned the commission aimed at dissolving the party, echoing the NLD's statement released earlier in the week.

=== 2021–present: Trials and formal imprisonment ===
On 24 May 2021, Aung San Suu Kyi appeared in person in court for the first time since the coup to face the "incitement to sedition" charge against her. During the 30-minute hearing, she said that she was not fully aware of what was going on outside as she had no access to full information from the outside and refused to respond on the matters. She was also quoted on the possibility of her party's forced dissolution as "Our party grew out of the people, so it will exist as long as people support it." In her meeting with her lawyers, Aung San Suu Kyi also wished people "good health".

On 10 June 2021, Aung San Suu Kyi was charged with corruption, the most serious charge brought against her, which carries a maximum penalty of 15 years' imprisonment. Aung San Suu Kyi's lawyers say the charges are made to keep her out of the public eye. On 14 June, the trial against Aung San Suu Kyi began. Any conviction would prevent her from running for office again. Aung San Suu Kyi's lawyers attempted to have prosecution testimony against her on the sedition charge disqualified but the motion was denied by the judge. On 13 September, court proceedings were postponed owing to Aung San Suu Kyi presenting "minor health issues" that impeded her from attending the court in person.

On 4 October 2021, Aung San Suu Kyi asked the judge to reduce her times of court appearances because of her fragile health. Aung San Suu Kyi described her health as "strained". In November, the Myanmar courts deferred the first verdicts in the trial without further explanation or giving dates. In the same month, she was again charged with corruption, related to the purchase and rental of a helicopter, bringing the total of charges to nearly a dozen. On 6 December, Suu Kyi was sentenced to 4 years in jail. Suu Kyi, who is still facing multiple charges and further sentences, was sentenced on the charge of inciting dissent and violating COVID-19 protocols. Following a partial pardon by the chief of the military government, Aung San Suu Kyi's four-year sentence was reduced to two years' imprisonment.

On 10 January 2022, the military court in Myanmar sentenced Suu Kyi to an additional four years in prison on several charges including "importing and owning walkie-talkies" and "breaking coronavirus rules". The trials, which are closed to the public, the media, and any observers, were described as a "courtroom circus of secret proceedings on bogus charges" by the deputy director for Asia of Human Rights Watch. On 27 April, Aung San Suu Kyi was sentenced to five years in jail on corruption charges. On 22 June 2022, junta authorities ordered that all further legal proceedings against Suu Kyi will take place in prison venues, instead of a courtroom. No explanation of the decision was given. Citing unidentified sources, the BBC reported that Suu Kyi was also moved on 22 June from house arrest, where she had had close companions, to solitary confinement in a specially built area inside a prison in Naypyidaw. This is the same prison in which Win Myint had similarly been placed in solitary confinement. The military confirmed that Suu Kyi had been moved to prison.

On 15 August 2022, sources following Aung San Suu Kyi's court proceedings said that she was sentenced to an additional six years' imprisonment after being found guilty on four corruption charges, bringing her overall sentence to 17 years in prison. In September 2022, she was convicted of election fraud and breaching the state's secrets act and sentenced to a total of six years in prison for both convictions, increasing her overall sentence to 23 years in prison. By 12 October 2022, she had been sentenced to 26 years imprisonment on ten charges in total, including five corruption charges. On 30 December 2022, her trials ended with another conviction and an additional sentence of seven years' imprisonment for corruption. Aung San Suu Kyi's final sentence is 33 years in prison.

On 12 July 2023, Thailand's foreign minister Don Pramudwinai said at the ASEAN Foreign Ministers' Meeting in Jakarta that he met with Aung San Suu Kyi during his visit to Myanmar. On 1 August 2023, the military junta granted Suu Kyi a partial pardon, reducing her sentence to a total of 27 years in prison. Before the pardon, she was moved from prison to a VIP government residence, according to an official from the NLD party. However, it was reported that since the beginning of September 2023, she is back in prison. The exact time when she was sent back to prison is unknown. Since January, Aung San Suu Kyi and her lawyers are trying to get six corruption charges overturned. To date, the requests are repeatedly denied.

On 16 April 2024, the military announced that Aung San Suu Kyi had been transferred to house arrest owing to a heat wave. However, pro-democracy publications such as The Irrawaddy claimed that she remains in prison, with air conditioners being added to her cell.

According to reports published on Democratic Voice of Burma, Aung San Suu Kyi was moved to an undisclosed location from house arrest around October 2025. In December 2025, Aung San Suu Kyi's son, Kim Aris, stated that nobody had heard from Aung directly since 2023, only being given second-hand information from the junta. As a result, he stated that he feared that she was dead.

On 17 April 2026, Aung San Suu Kyi's sentence was reduced to 22.5 years as part of a general wave of amnesties and commutations by Min Aung Hlaing's Union Government of Myanmar during Thingyan. On 30 April, the military government reduced her sentence by one-sixth and commuted it to house arrest; she will continue to serve the remaining 18 years and 9 months of her sentence at a designated residence. A photo of her was also broadcast by state media for the first time in years.

In early August 2026, Suu Kyi met with the International Committee of the Red Cross (ICRC) representative in Naypyidaw. The military-backed government released photos of the meeting as part of a life campaign.

The meeting came amid calls from several ASEAN member states for access to Suu Kyi, who had been held largely incommunicado throughout her detention. It also followed an international campaign led by her son, Kim Aris, calling on the military authorities to provide proof that she was alive and to allow independent access to her.

In an August 2026 interview for Time, Min Aung Hlaing claimed that he showed "extremely lenient" treatment towards Aung San Suu Kyi. He also stated that he "exercised [his] authority to reduce her sentence."

In October 2026, a presidential spokesperson released photos of Aung San Suu Kyi receiving presents from Britain’s King Charles delivered by home ministry officials. The Guardian reported that critics believed this to be a "stunt by the country’s military to end diplomatic isolation." Her son, Kim Aris, also called her on 22 October, but still urged for her release.

== Political beliefs ==
It is not power that corrupts, but fear. Fear of losing power corrupts those who wield it, and fear of the scourge of power corrupts those who are subject to it.

— Freedom from Fear

When asked about the democratic models that Myanmar could look to for its own development, Aang San Suu Kyi said, "We have many, many lessons to learn from various places, not just the Asian countries like South Korea, Taiwan, Mongolia, and Indonesia", but also "the Eastern European countries which made the transition from communist autocracy to democracy in the 1980s and 1990s, and the Latin American countries which made the transition from military governments. And we cannot of course forget South Africa, because although it wasn't a military regime, it was certainly an authoritarian regime."

Aang San Suu Kyi also said, "We wish to learn from everybody who has achieved a transition to democracy, and also... our great strong point is that, because we are so far behind everybody else, we can also learn which mistakes we should avoid."

In a nod to the deep US political divide between Republicans led by Mitt Romney and the Democrats by Barack Obama—then battling to win the 2012 presidential election—she stressed, "Those of you who are familiar with American politics I'm sure understand the need for negotiated compromise."

== Related organisations ==
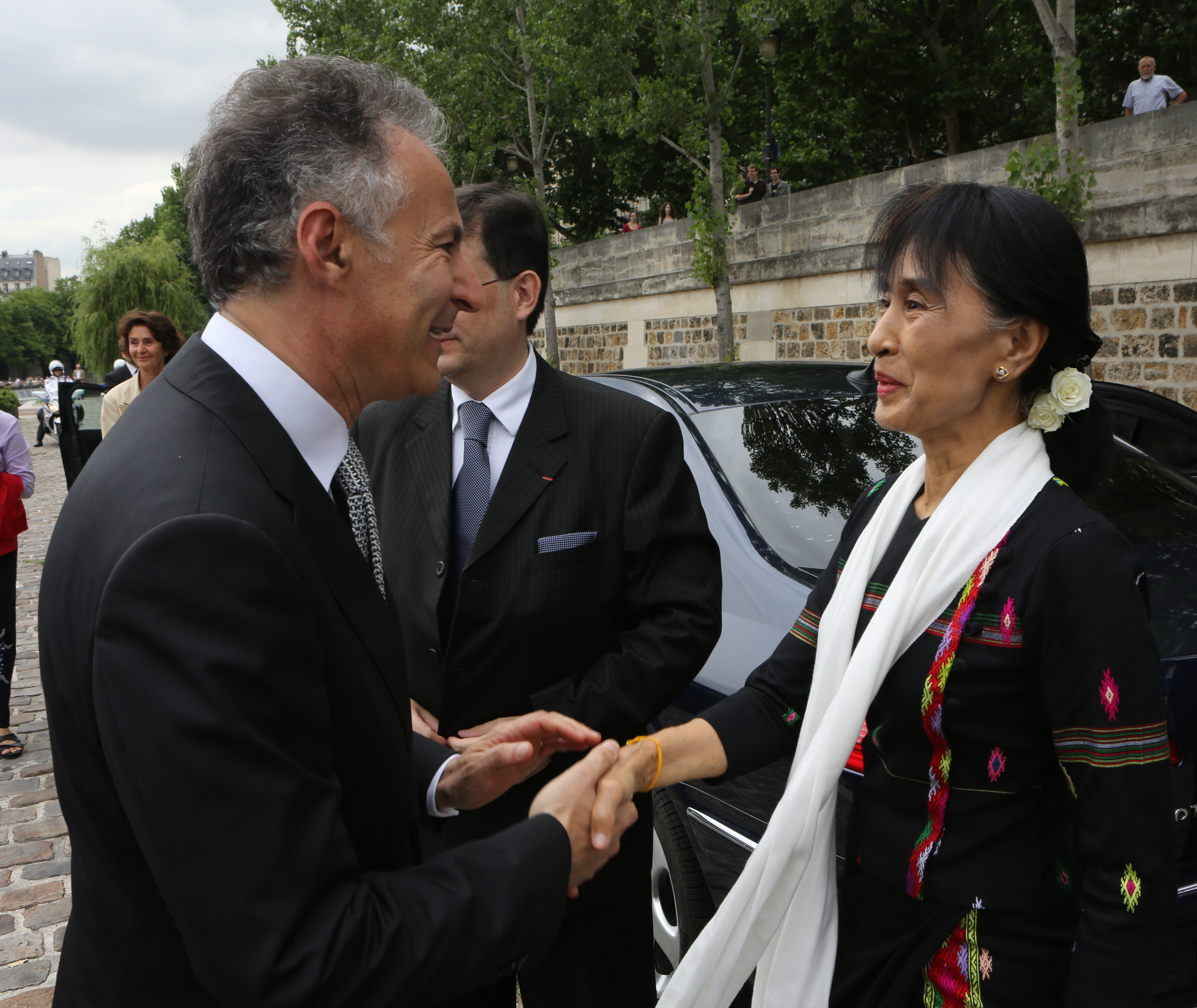
Aung San Suu Kyi with French Ambassador for Human Rights, François Zimeray, 2012

- Freedom Now, a US-based non-profit organisation, was retained in 2006 by a member of her family to help secure Aung San Suu Kyi's release from house arrest. The organisation secured several opinions from the UN Working Group on Arbitrary Detention that her detention violated international law; engaged in political advocacy such as spearheading a letter from 112 former Presidents and Prime Ministers to UN Secretary-General Ban Ki-moon urging him to go to Burma to seek her release, which he did six weeks later; and published numerous op-eds and spoke widely to the media about her ongoing detention. Its representation of her ended when she was released from house arrest on 13 November 2010.
- Aung San Suu Kyi has been an honorary board member of International IDEA and ARTICLE 19 since her detention, and has received support from these organisations.
- The Vrije Universiteit Brussel and the University of Louvain (UCLouvain), both located in Belgium, granted her the title of Doctor Honoris Causa.
- In 2003, the Freedom Forum recognised Aung San Suu Kyi's efforts to promote democracy peacefully with the Al Neuharth Free Spirit of the Year Award, in which she was presented over satellite because she was under house arrest. She was awarded one million dollars.
- In June of each year, the U.S. Campaign for Burma organises hundreds of "Arrest Yourself" house parties around the world in support of Aung San Suu Kyi. At these parties, the organisers keep themselves under house arrest for 24 hours, invite their friends, and learn more about Burma and Aung San Suu Kyi.
- The Freedom Campaign, a joint effort between the Human Rights Action Center and US Campaign for Burma, looks to raise worldwide attention to the struggles of Aung San Suu Kyi and the people of Burma.
- The Burma Campaign UK is a UK-based NGO (Non-Governmental Organisation) that aims to raise awareness of Burma's struggles and follow the guidelines established by the NLD and Aung San Suu Kyi.
- St Hugh's College, Oxford, where she studied, had a Burmese theme for their annual ball in support of her in 2006. The university later awarded her an honorary doctorate in civil law on 20 June 2012 during her visit to her alma mater.
- Aung San Suu Kyi is the official patron of The Rafto Human Rights House in Bergen, Norway. She received the Thorolf Rafto Memorial Prize in 1990.
- She was made an honorary free person of the City of Dublin, Ireland in November 1999, although a space had been left on the roll of signatures to symbolize her continued detention. This was subsequently revoked on 13 December 2017.
- In November 2005 the human rights group Equality Now proposed Aung Sun Suu Kyi as a potential candidate, among other qualifying women, for the position of U.N. Secretary General. In the proposed list of qualified women Aung San Suu Kyi was recognised by Equality Now as the Prime Minister-Elect of Burma.
- The UN's special envoy to Myanmar, Ibrahim Gambari, met Aung San Suu Kyi on 10 March 2008 before wrapping up his trip to the military-ruled country.
- Aung San Suu Kyi was an honorary member of The Elders, a group of eminent global leaders brought together by Nelson Mandela. Her ongoing detention meant that she was unable to take an active role in the group, so The Elders placed an empty chair for her at their meetings. The Elders have consistently called for the release of all political prisoners in Burma. Upon her election to parliament, she stepped down from her post.
- In 2010, Aung San Suu Kyi was given an honorary doctorate from the University of Johannesburg.
- In 2011, Aung San Suu Kyi was named the Guest Director of the 45th Brighton Festival.
- She was part of the international jury of Human Rights Defenders and Personalities who helped to choose a universal Logo for Human Rights in 2011.
- In June 2011, the BBC announced that Aung San Suu Kyi was to deliver the 2011 Reith Lectures. The BBC covertly recorded two lectures with Aung San Suu Kyi in Burma, which were then smuggled out of the country and brought back to London. The lectures were broadcast on BBC Radio 4 and the BBC World Service on 28 June 2011 and 5 July 2011.
- 8 March 2012, Canadian Foreign Affairs Minister John Baird presented Aung San Suu Kyi a certificate of honorary Canadian citizenship and an informal invitation to visit Canada. The honorary citizenship was revoked in September 2018 owing to the Rohingya conflict.
- In April 2012, British Prime Minister David Cameron became the first leader of a major world power to visit Aung San Suu Kyi and the first British prime minister to visit Burma since the 1950s. In his visit, Cameron invited Aung San Suu Kyi to Britain, where she would be able to visit her "beloved" Oxford, an invitation that she later accepted. She visited Britain on 19 June 2012.
- In 2012, she received the honorary degree of Doctor of Civil Law from the University of Oxford.
- In May 2012, Aung San Suu Kyi received the inaugural Václav Havel Prize for Creative Dissent of the Human Rights Foundation.
- 29 May 2012 PM Manmohan Singh of India visited Aung San Suu Kyi. In his visit, the PM invited Aung San Suu Kyi to India as well. She started her six-day visit to India on 16 November 2012, where among the places she visited was her alma mater Lady Shri Ram College in New Delhi.
- In 2012, Aung San Suu Kyi set up the charity Daw Khin Kyi Foundation to improve health, education and living standards in underdeveloped parts of Myanmar. The charity was named after Aung San Suu Kyi's mother. Htin Kyaw played a leadership role in the charity before his election as President of Myanmar. The charity runs a Hospitality and Catering Training Academy in Kawhmu Township, in Yangon Region, and runs a mobile library service which in 2014 had 8000 members.
- Seoul National University in South Korea conferred an honorary doctorate to Aung San Suu Kyi in February 2013.
- University of Bologna, Italy conferred an honorary doctorate in philosophy to Aung San Suu Kyi in October 2013.
- Monash University, The Australian National University, University of Sydney and University of Technology, Sydney conferred an honorary degree to Aung San Suu Kyi in November 2013.

== In popular culture ==
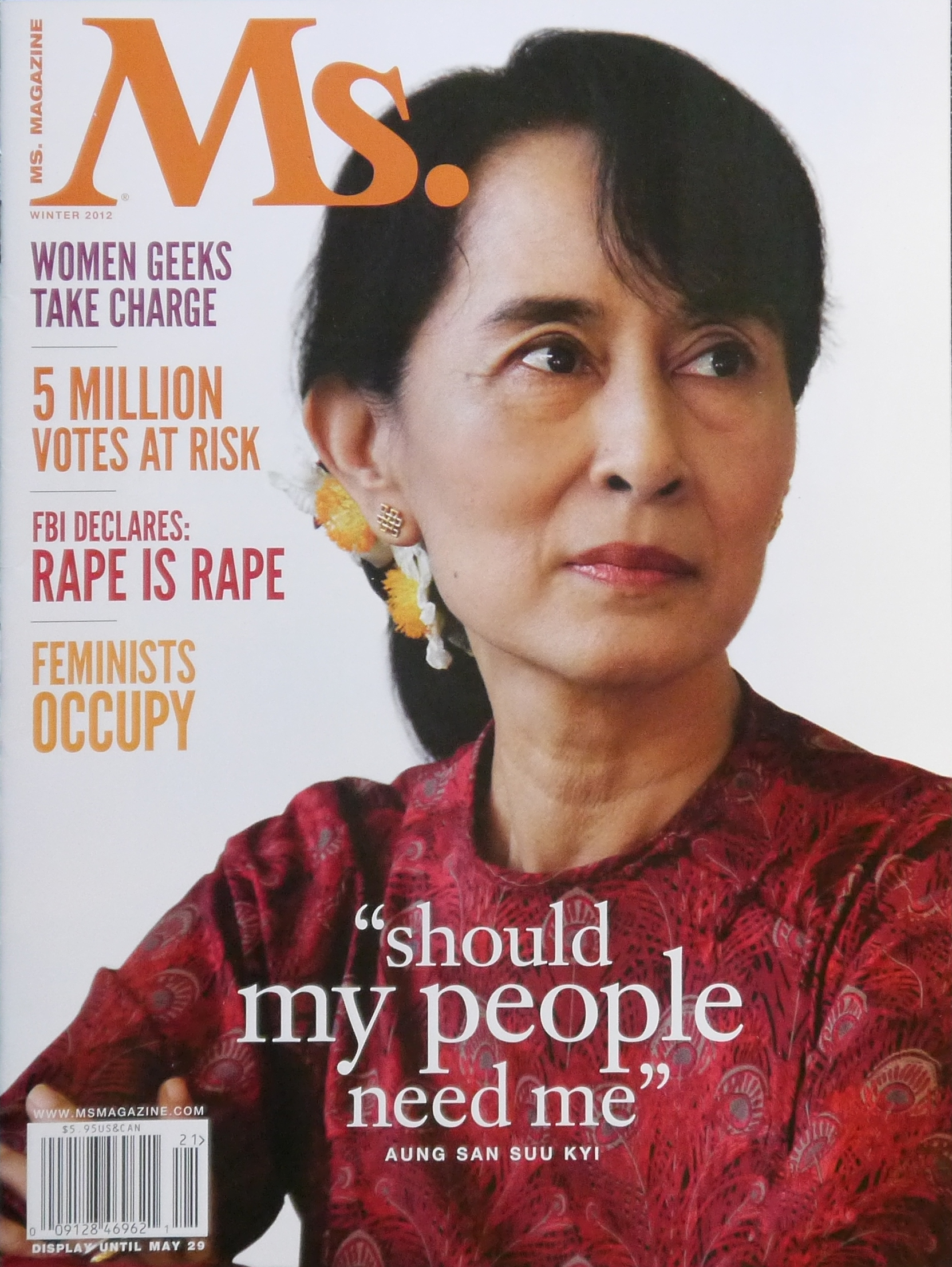
Aung San Suu Kyi on the cover of Ms. in 2012

The life of Aung San Suu Kyi and her husband, Michael Aris, is portrayed in Luc Besson's 2011 film The Lady, in which they are played by Michelle Yeoh and David Thewlis. Yeoh visited Aung San Suu Kyi in 2011 before the film's release in November. In the John Boorman's 1995 film Beyond Rangoon, Aung San Suu Kyi was played by Adelle Lutz.

Irish songwriters Damien Rice and Lisa Hannigan released in 2005 the single "Unplayed Piano", in support of the Free Aung San Suu Kyi 60th Birthday Campaign that was happening at the time.

Irish rock band U2 wrote the song "Walk On" in tribute to Aung San Suu Kyi. It is the fourth track on their tenth studio album, All That You Can't Leave Behind (2000), and would later be issued as a single. Lead singer Bono is wearing a T-shirt with her image and name on the front in their official video of the song. "Walk On" won Record of the Year at the 2002 Grammy Awards, which also featured U2 performing the song. Bono publicised her plight during the U2 360° Tour, 2009–2011.

Saxophonist Wayne Shorter composed a song titled "Aung San Suu Kyi". It appears on his albums 1+1 (with pianist Herbie Hancock) and Footprints Live!.

Meta whistleblower Sarah Wynn-Williams mentions Aung San Suu Kyi in her book Careless People. The two meet briefly at the World Economic Forum luncheon in June 2013.

== Health problems ==
Aung San Suu Kyi underwent surgery for a gynaecological condition in September 2003 at Asia Royal Hospital during her house arrest. She also underwent minor foot surgery in December 2013 and eye surgery in April 2016. In June 2012, her doctor Tin Myo Win said that she had no serious health problems, but weighed only 48 kilograms (106 lb), had low blood pressure, and could become weak easily.

After being arrested and detained on 1 February 2021, there were concerns that Aung San Suu Kyi's health was deteriorating. However, according to military's spokesperson Zaw Min Tun, special attention is given to her health and living condition. Don Pramudwinai also said that "she was in good health, both physically and mentally".

Although a junta spokesperson claimed that she is in good health, since being sent back to prison in September 2023, it is reported that her health condition is worsening and she is "suffering of toothache and unable to eat". Her request to see a dentist had been denied. Her son is urging the junta to allow Aung San Suu Kyi to receive medical assistance.

According to her son, Kim Aris, Aung San Suu Kyi is suffering from a heart condition. A cardiologist was requested, but he did not know if the request was granted.

== Books ==
- Freedom from Fear (1991) (ISBN 0-14-025317-3)
- Letters from Burma (1991) (ISBN 0141041447)
- Let's Visit Nepal (1985) (ISBN 978-0222009814)

== Honours ==
- List of awards and honours received by Aung San Suu Kyi

== See also ==
- List of deposed politicians
- List of elected or appointed female heads of state or government
- List of heads of state and government who were later imprisoned
- Politics of Myanmar

== Notes ==
Party political offices
New office	General Secretary of the National League for Democracy; 1988–present	Incumbent
New title	Chairperson of the National League for Democracy; 2011–2023	Office abolished
Assembly seats
Preceded by Soe Tint	Member of the House of Representatives for Kawhmu; 2012–2016	Vacant
Political offices
Preceded by Wunna Maung Lwin	Minister of Foreign Affairs; 2016–2021	Succeeded by Wunna Maung Lwin
Preceded by Aung Min; Hla Tun; Soe Maung; Soe Thein; Thein Nyunt	Minister of the President's Office; 2016–2021	Succeeded by TBA
New title	State Counsellor of Myanmar; 2016–2021	Succeeded by Min Aung Hlaing as Chairman of the State Administration Council
Awards and achievements
Preceded by Alexander Dubček	Recipient of the Sakharov Prize; 1990	Succeeded by Adem Demaçi
Preceded by Doina Cornea	Recipient of the Thorolf Rafto Memorial Prize; 1990	Succeeded by Yelena Bonner
Preceded by Péter Molnár	Recipient of the Thorolf Rafto Memorial Prize; 1990	Succeeded by Yelena Bonner
Preceded by Mikhail Gorbachev	Recipient of the Nobel Peace Prize; 1991	Succeeded by Rigoberta Menchú
Preceded by Maurice Strong	Recipient of the Jawaharlal Nehru Award; 1993	Succeeded by Mahathir Mohamad
Preceded by Dandeniya Gamage Jayanthi	Recipient of the Gwangju Prize for Human Rights; 2004 (withdrawn 2018)	Succeeded by Wardah Hafidz
Preceded by Denis Mukwege	Recipient of the Wallenberg Medal; 2011	Succeeded by Maria Gunnoe
