= Freedom from fear (disambiguation) =

Freedom from fear is one of the Four Freedoms described by U.S. president Franklin D. Roosevelt.

Freedom from fear may also refer to:

- Freedom from Fear (Aung San Suu Kyi), a 1991 book by Aung San Suu Kyi
- Freedom from Fear: The American People in Depression and War, 1929–1945, a 1999 book by David M. Kennedy
- Freedom from Fear (painting), by Norman Rockwell
