= List of awards and honours received by Aung San Suu Kyi =

Aung San Suu Kyi has received numerous honours and awards, including the 1991 Nobel Peace Prize and the Presidential Medal of Freedom, throughout her life for her peace and freedom activism in her homeland of Myanmar. However, since the start of the Rohingya genocide in 2016, many of these honours and awards have been revoked due to her perceived inaction to stop the crisis.

== Currently held ==
=== Orders, decorations and medals ===
Foreign

- Honorary Companion of the Order of Australia (AC) - Civil Division (24 May 1996).
- Presidential Medal of Freedom (6 December 2000)
- Commander of the National Order of the Legion of Honour (21 January 2012)
- Sultan of Brunei Golden Jubilee Medal (6 October 2017)

=== Other distinctions ===
- (Norway) Nobel Peace Prize (14 October 1991)
- (Sweden) Olof Palme Prize (2005)
- (United States) Congressional Gold Medal (6 May 2008)
- (England) Chatham House Prize (2011)
- (United States) The Wallenberg Medal from the University of Michigan (2011)
- (United States) In 2019, Time created 89 new covers to celebrate women of the year starting from 1920; it chose Aung San Suu Kyi for 1990 (2019)

=== Scholastic ===
University Degrees

Location	Date	School	Degree
England	1967	St. Hugh's College, Oxford	Bachelor of Arts (BA) in Philosophy, politics and economics
England	1988	SOAS, University of London	Master of Philosophy (M.Phil) in Burmese literature candidate

Chancellor, visitor, governor, rector, and fellowships

Location	Date	School	Position
Japan	1985 – 1986	Center for Southeast Asian Studies at Kyoto University	Visiting scholar
India	February 1987 – February 1989	Indian Institute of Advanced Study	Fellow
England	1990 –	St Hugh's College, Oxford	Honorary Fellow
England	1991 – 9 November 2017	LSE Students' Union	Honorary President
England	2009 –	Liverpool John Moores University	Honorary Fellow
Connecticut	2012 – 2013	Timothy Dwight College at Yale University	Chubb Fellow
Japan	15 April 2013 –	Kyoto University	Honorary Fellow
England	–	St Antony's College, Oxford	Honorary Fellow

=== Honorary degrees ===
Honorary degrees

Location	Date	School	Degree	Status
Ontario	November 1993	University of Toronto	Doctor of Laws (LL.D)	
District of Columbia	January 1997	American University	Doctor of Laws (LL.D)	
Czech Republic	10 January 1997	Charles University	Doctor of Laws (LL.D)	
Australia	1997	University of Technology Sydney	Doctor of Letters (D.Litt)	
South Africa	1997	University of Natal	Doctor of Laws (LL.D)	
England	1998	University of Bath	Doctor of Laws (LL.D)	
England	1998	University of Bristol	Doctor of Laws (LL.D)	
Australia	1998	University of Melbourne	Doctor of Laws (LL.D)	
New Zealand	1999	Victoria University of Wellington	Doctor of Laws (LL.D)	
Newfoundland and Labrador	May 2004	Memorial University of Newfoundland	Doctor of Laws (LL.D)	
Northern Ireland	2009	Ulster University	Doctor of Laws (LL.D)	
South Africa	October 2011	University of Johannesburg	Doctor of Philosophy (Ph.D)	
Maryland	2012	Johns Hopkins University	Doctor of Humane Letters (DHL)	
Hong Kong	15 March 2012	University of Hong Kong	Doctor of Laws (LL.D)	
Republic of Ireland	18 June 2012	Trinity College Dublin	Doctor of Laws (LL.D)	
England	20 June 2012	University of Oxford	Doctor of Civil Law (DCL)	
California	September 2012	University of San Francisco	Doctorate	
Australia	27 November 2013	University of Sydney	Doctor of Laws (LL.D)	
Australia	30 November 2013	Monash University	Doctor of Laws (LL.D)	
Australia	2013	Australian National University	Doctor of Letters (D.Litt)	
Taiwan	12 December 2015	National Chiao Tung University	Doctorate	
Japan	3 November 2016	Kyoto University	Doctorate	

=== Memberships and fellowships ===
Country	Date	Organisation	Position
Scotland	10 February 2015 –	Royal College of Surgeons of Edinburgh	Honorary Fellow

=== Freedom of the City ===
- (Italy) 1994: Rome (Collected on 27 October 2013)
- (England) 13 May 2011: Brighton and Hove

== Revoked or status otherwise withdrawn ==
=== Honorary citizenship ===
- Honorary Canadian citizenship (awarded 2007, due to concerns over the Rohingya genocide, revoked 27 September 2018 by unanimous vote of the House of Commons of the Parliament of Canada, with the unanimous concurrence of the Senate of Canada on 2 October 2018). She is the first recipient of honorary Canadian citizenship to have the honour withdrawn.

=== Distinctions of societies and associations ===
- (European Union) Sakharov Prize (1990), rescinded on 10 September 2020
- (United Kingdom) Amnesty International Ambassador of Conscience Award (2009), rescinded on 11 November 2018
- The Elie Wiesel Award from the United States Holocaust Memorial Museum (2012), rescinded on 6 March 2018.

=== Honorary degrees ===
- Ontario Queen's University Doctor of Laws (LL.D; awarded 1995, revoked 30 November 2018)
- Ontario Carleton University Doctor of Laws (LL.D; awarded 2011, revoked 19 October 2018)

=== Memberships and fellowships ===
- United Kingdom Hony. Member of UNISON (suspended 20 September 2017)

=== Freedoms of cities ===
- (England) 1997: Oxford (Revoked on 27 November 2017)
- (Republic of Ireland) 1 November 1999: Dublin (Revoked on 13 December 2017)
- (France) 2004: Paris (Revoked on 13 December 2018)
- (Scotland) 2005: Edinburgh (Revoked on 23 August 2018)
- (Republic of Ireland) 2005: Galway (Galway City Council revoked Freedom on 11 February 2019)
- (England) 2005: Sheffield (Revoked in November 2017)
- (Scotland) 2008: Dundee (Revoked in September 2018)
- (Scotland) 2009: Glasgow (Revoked on 3 November 2017)
- (England) 18 June 2011: Newcastle (Revoked in August 2018)
- (England) May 2017: London (Revoked on 5 March 2020)
