= Nattalin =

Town in Myanmar

Nattalin နတ်တလင်းမြို့
- Town
- Interactive map of Nattalin
- Coordinates: 18.43091°N 95.5515°E
- Country: Myanmar
- Region: Bago Region
- District: Nattalin District
- Township: Nattalin Township

Area
  - Total: 0.74 sq mi (1.9 km^{2})

Population (2023)
  - Total: 3,945
  - Density: 5,300/sq mi (2,100/km^{2})
- Time zone: UTC+6:30 (MMT)

Nattalin (Burmese: နတ်တလင်း) is the principal town of Nattalin Township and Nattalin District, located in northwestern Bago Region, Myanmar.
