= Zigon =

Zigon ဇီးကုန်း
- Town
- Location within Myanmar
- Coordinates: 18°20′18″N 95°37′23″E
- Country: Myanmar
- Region: Bago Region
- District: Nattalin District
- Township: Zigon Township

Population (2014)
  - Town: 67,523
  - Urban: 15,233
  - Rural: 52,290
- Time zone: UTC+6.30 (MST)

Zigon (Burmese: ဇီးကုန်း) is a town in Nattalin District, Bago Region of Myanmar. It is the administrative seat of Zigon Township.
