= Nyan Win =

Burmese major general and chief minister

His Excellency Nyan Win
- ဉာဏ်ဝင်း
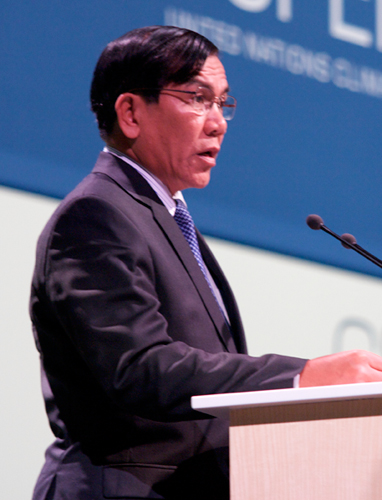
- Nyan Win at UN Climate Change Conference in Copenhagen, Denmark in December 2009.

1st Chief Minister of Bago Region
- In office 30 March 2011 – 30 March 2016
- Appointed by: President of Myanmar
- President: Thein Sein
- Preceded by: Office Established
- Succeeded by: Win Thein
- Constituency: Zigon Township

18th Minister of Foreign Affairs
- In office 18 September 2004 – 30 March 2011
- Leader: Than Shwe
- Preceded by: Win Aung
- Succeeded by: Wunna Maung Lwin

Deputy Chief of Armed Forces Training

Personal details
- Born: January 22, 1953 (age 73)
- Party: Union Solidarity and Development Party
- Spouse: Myint Myint Soe
- Children: Than Nyan Soe, San Nyan Soe, Kyaw Htoo Naing
- Education: Defence Services Academy; National Defence College, India
- Awards: Thiri Pyanchi

Military service
- Branch/service: Myanmar Army
- Rank: Major General

Nyan Win (Burmese: ဉာဏ်ဝင်း, pronounced [ɲàɰ̃ wɪ́ɰ̃]; born 22 January 1953) is a former Chief Minister of Bago Region, having served from 2011 to 2016. He won a Regional Hluttaw seat in an uncontested election in 2010, representing Zigon Township, and was appointed Chief Minister of the region on 30 March 2011. Prior to his election, he was the Minister of Foreign Affairs of Myanmar, having been appointed on 18 September 2004. He was a Major General in the Burmese Army. He was Deputy Chief of Military Training for the Myanmar Armed Forces before he became a member of the SPDC. He also served as Commandant of CGSC (Command and General Staff College). He graduated from the 15th intake of Defence Services Academy (DSA). He is married to Myint Myint Soe.
