= Nattalin Township =

Nattalin နတ်တလင်းမြို့နယ်
- Township
- Location in Nattalin District
- Coordinates: 18°23′N 95°48′E
- Country: Myanmar
- Region: Bago Region
- District: Nattalin District
- Capital: Nattalin

Area
  - Total: 527.94 sq mi (1,367.4 km^{2})
- Elevation: 100 ft (30 m)

Population (2023)
  - Total: 178,218
  - Density: 337.57/sq mi (130.34/km^{2})
  - Ethnicities: Bamar; Karen
- Time zone: UTC+6.30 (MMT)

Nattalin is a township in Nattalin District in the Bago Region of Myanmar. The township has two towns- the principal town of Nattalin and the slightly larger town of Tar Pun comprising a total of 7 urban wards. It also contains 364 villages grouped into 77 village tracts.
