= Thegon Township =

Township in Bago Region, Myanmar

Coordinates: 18°38′58″N 95°25′03″E

- Township
- Location in Nattalin District
- Country: Myanmar
- Region: Bago Region
- District: Nattalin District
- Capital: Thegon
- Time zone: UTC+6.30 (MMT)

Thegon Township is a township in Nattalin District in the Bago Region of Myanmar. The principal town is Thegon.
