= Letters from Burma =

Book of essays by Aung San Suu Kyi published in 1997

- Cover of 2010 printing
- Author: Aung San Suu Kyi
- Published: 1997
- ISBN: 9780141041445

Letters from Burma is a book of essays by Aung San Suu Kyi published in 1997. It has been published in English and Japanese.
