= Zigon Township =

Zigon Township Zigon
- Township
- Location in Nattalin District
- Coordinates: 18.3469°N 95.6628°E
- Country: Myanmar
- Region: Bago Region
- District: Nattalin District
- Capital: Zigon
- Time zone: UTC+6.30 (MMT)

Zigon Township is a township in the Nattalin District of the Bago Region in Myanmar. The principal town is Zigon.
