= Freedom from Fear (Aung San Suu Kyi) =

1991 essay and book by Aung San Suu Kyi

- Author: Aung San Suu Kyi
- Genre: Non-fiction
- Publisher: Penguin Books
- ISBN: 978-0-141-03949-7

Freedom from Fear is both an essay by Aung San Suu Kyi, as well as an anthology of her essays entitled “Sexual Politics,” published in 1991.

In honor of Aung San Suu Kyi and the human rights abuses in Burma, The Freedom Campaign released a feature documentary film entitled Freedom from Fear in 2008. A preview is available at the Freedom Campaign's website.
