= Honorary Canadian citizenship =

Title of honor conferred by the Parliament of Canada

Awarded by Parliament of Canada
- Type: Honorary citizenship
- Established: 1985
- Country: Canada

Statistics
- First induction: 1985
- Total inductees: 7

Honorary Canadian citizenship (French: citoyenneté canadienne honoraire) is an honour bestowed on foreigners of exceptional merit following a joint resolution by both Houses of the Parliament of Canada.

Honorary Canadian citizenship is purely symbolic; the recipient does not receive any of the rights, privileges, or duties typically held by a Canadian citizen.

== Recipients of honorary Canadian citizenship ==
Honorary Canadian citizenship revoked by parliamentary vote

| # | Name | Image | Award date | Country | Notes |
|---|---|---|---|---|---|
| 1 | Raoul Wallenberg (born 1912, disappeared 1945) | | 1985 (posthumous) | Sweden | Diplomat and humanitarian. Posthumous recipient of the U.S. Congressional Gold Medal, and posthumous honorary citizen of the United States. |
| 2 | Nelson Mandela (1918–2013) | | 2001 | South Africa | Anti-apartheid activist, first post-apartheid President of South Africa, and recipient of the 1993 Nobel Peace Prize. |
| 3 | Tenzin Gyatso (born 1935) | | 2006 | India (born in Tibet) | 14th Dalai Lama and recipient of the 1989 Nobel Peace Prize. |
| 4 | Aung San Suu Kyi (born 1945) | | 2007 | Myanmar | Opposition leader and recipient of the 1991 Nobel Peace Prize. Revoked by parliamentary vote in 2018 in response to the Rohingya genocide. |
| 5 | Prince Karim al-Husseini (1936-2025) | | 2010 | United Kingdom (born in Switzerland) | 49th Imam of the Shia Ismaili Muslims and Honorary Companion of the Order of Canada. |
| 6 | Malala Yousafzai (born 1997) | | 2014 (Note: Received award in 2017) | Pakistan | Women's rights and education activist, and recipient of the 2014 Nobel Peace Prize. |
| 7 | Vladimir Kara-Murza (born 1981) | | 2023 | United Kingdom (born in Russia) | Political activist, journalist, author, filmmaker. |

== Revocations ==
Canadian civil society groups and other protestors called for the revocation of Aung San Suu Kyi's honorary citizenship in response to UN allegations that the 2017 persecution by the Burmese military against the Rohingya, an ethno-religious minority group in Burma, constituted ethnic cleansing. This included an online Change.org petition addressed to Prime Minister Justin Trudeau and the House of Commons of Canada. The House of Commons voted unanimously on September 27, 2018, to revoke her honorary citizenship. The Senate of Canada approved a motion to the same effect unanimously on October 2, 2018. With revocation motions passed by both houses, the Government of Canada stated that it recognized Parliament's decision to revoke the honour.

== See also ==
- Citizenship
- Honorary citizenship of the United States
