= Asia Royal Cardiac & Medical Care Centre =

Hospital in Sanchaung, Yangon, Myanmar

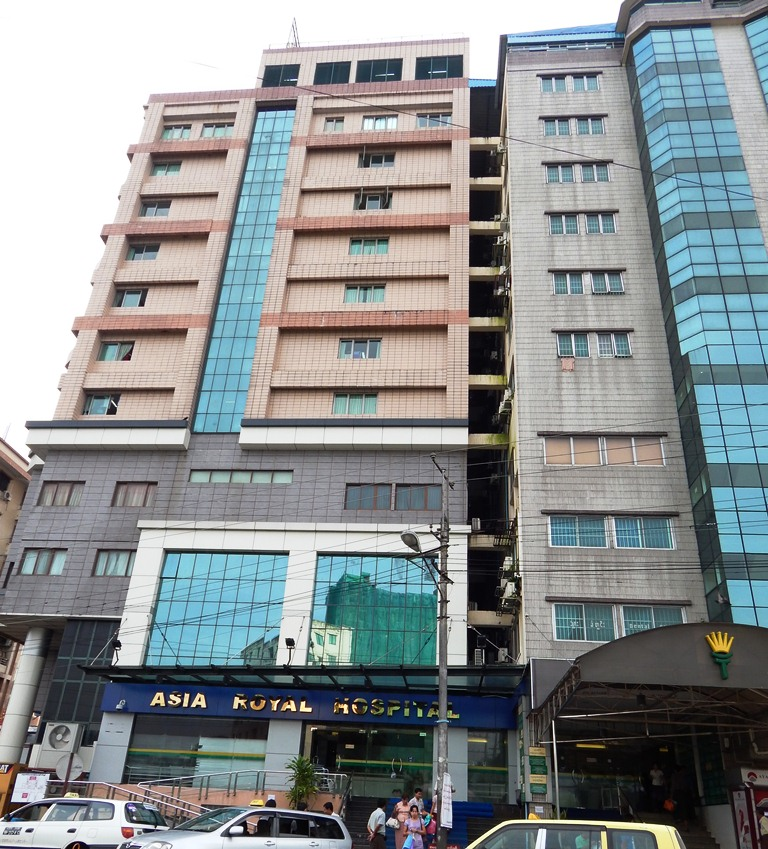

Geography
- Location: Sanchaung Township, Yangon, Myanmar
- Coordinates: 16.798485°N 96.131233°E

History
- Opened: 18 March 2000

Links
- Website: asiaroyalmedical.com
- Lists: Hospitals in Myanmar

Asia Royal Cardiac & Medical Care Centre (Burmese: အာရှတော်ဝင်ဆေးရုံ) is a private hospital located in No. 14, Baho Street, Sanchaung Township, Yangon, Myanmar. The eleven-story, twin-building hospital opened on 18 March 2000.
