= Nattalin District =

Nattalin District နတ်တလင်းခရိုင်
- District
- Location in Bago region
- Coordinates: 18°25′N 95°33′E
- Country: Myanmar
- Region: Bago Region

Nattalin District (Burmese: နတ်တလင်းခရိုင်) is a district of the Bago Region in central Burma (Myanmar). Nattalin Township is located in the district.

== Townships ==
Townships in Nattalin District Nattalin Zigon Paungde Thegon

The district contains the following townships:

- Nattalin Township
- Zigon Township
- Thegon Township
- Paungde Township
