= Aye Myint =

Burmese politician

Thura Aye Myint
- အေးမြင့်

Minister of Labour
- In office July 2013 – 30 March 2016
- Preceded by: Than Htay
- Succeeded by: Thein Swe

Minister of Industry
- In office August 2012 – July 2013

Minister of Science and Technology
- In office March 2011 – August 2012

Deputy Chairman of the Union Solidarity and Development Party
- In office October 2012 – August 2015
- Preceded by: Shwe Mann
- Succeeded by: Myat Hein

Member of the Pyithu Hluttaw
- In office March 2011 – March 2011
- Preceded by: Constituency established
- Succeeded by: Pyone Kathy Naing
- Constituency: Mawlamyine Township
- Majority: 47,141

Personal details
- Party: Union Solidarity and Development Party
- Spouse: Aye Aye
- Children: Nay Linn

Military service
- Allegiance: Burma
- Branch/service: Myanmar Army
- Rank: Major-general

Thura Aye Myint (Burmese: အေးမြင့်) was the Minister of Labour of Burmese from 2013 to 2016.

Aye Myint contested the 2010 Burmese general election as a Union Solidarity and Development Party candidate, winning a Pyithu Hluttaw seat for the Mawlamyine Township constituency. He served as Minister of Science and Technology from March 2011 to August 2012 and as Minister of Industry from August 2012 to July 2013.

A military officer, Aye Myint is a former major general in the Myanmar Army. During the State Peace and Development Council era, he served as Minister of Sports, and Deputy Minister of Defense. Aye Myint was elected Deputy chairman of the Union Solidarity and Development Party, in office from October 2012 to August 2015 succeeded by Myat Hein, former Minister for Communications and Information Technology and retired general. He is married to Aye Aye, and has a son, Nay Linn.
