= Oil and gas industry in Myanmar =

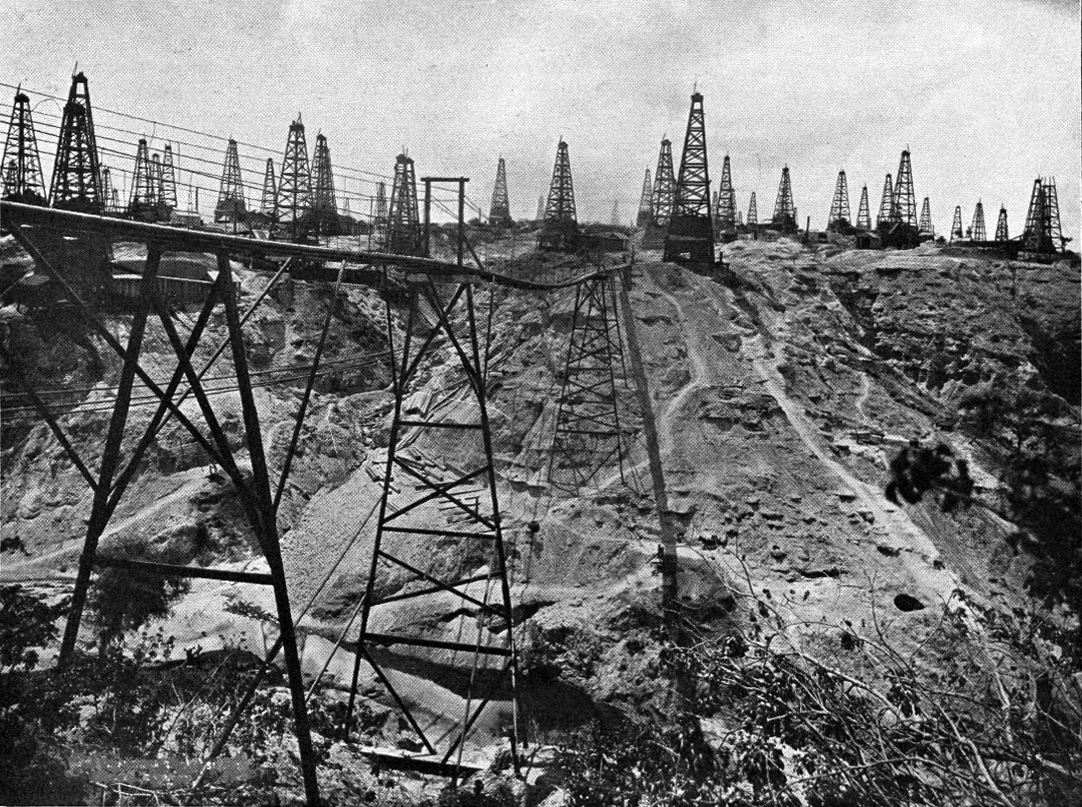
Oil wells in Yenangyaung, 1910

Myanmar, is a developing country and an important natural gas and petroleum producer in Asia. It is home to one of the world's oldest petroleum industries, with its first crude oil exports dating back to 1853. Today, the country is one of the major natural gas producers in the Asian continent. Decades of isolation, sanctions, a lack of technical capacity, opaque government policies and insufficient investment has impeded the country's efforts to develop an upstream hydrocarbon sector. Recent but slow political reform has led the international community to ease sanctions on Burma, giving rise to hopes of greater investment and economic growth. In 2015-2016, the petroleum industry attracted the highest-ever amount (USD 4.8 billion) of foreign direct investment (FDI) in the history of Myanmar.

== History ==
Early British explorers in Burma discovered a flourishing oil extraction industry in the town of Yenangyaung in 1795. The area had hundreds of hand-dug oil wells under the hereditary control of 24 Burmese families.

British Burma exported its first barrel of crude oil in 1853. The London-based Burmah Oil Company (BOC) was established in 1871 and began production in the Yenangyaung field in 1887 and the Chauk field in 1902. BOC enjoyed a monopoly in the sector until 1901, when the American Standard Oil Company launched operations in Burma. Oil supplies largely met the demand of British India. Prior to World War II and the Japanese invasion of Burma, oil production stood at 6.5 million barrels annually. After independence in 1948, the oil wells had dried up after decades of British extraction.

In 1963, the socialist military government led by Ne Win nationalized the sector, causing decades of economic stagnation.

After 1989, the military junta began opening up the country to more foreign investment. Shell discovered the Apyauk gas field 50 kilometres northwest of Yangon in 1991.

In 2015, Myanmar had four offshore natural gas producing fields, with the earliest Yadana field starting production in 1999. Onshore gas producing was older with the Mann field running since 1970. Gas pipelines with stakeholders from Korea, Thailand, India, China and the Myanma Oil and Gas Enterprise (MOGE). As a net gas exporter, Myanmar supplied gas to China and Thailand due to limited domestic consumption. The longest of these pipelines began pre-construction in 2004, and construction in 2008 between China National Petroleum Corporation and Daewoo International to connect the Shwe gas field to Chinese markets. This became part of the Sino-Myanmar pipelines which became controversial in the 2010s as developmental pressures increased domestic energy demand.

In 2021, the Myanmar military seized the oil and gas sector during the 2021 Myanmar coup d'état. In the ensuing civil war, the Sino-Myanmar pipelines became a point of focus for both sides to gain support from or leverage against Chinese interests, being increasingly caught between combatants.

== Current status ==
Myanmar is today primarily a natural gas producer. As of 2015, Myanmar exports gas to Thailand and China. Myanmar had proven gas reserves of 10 trillion cubic feet in 2012, with an annual production capacity of 416 BcF. Oil reserves in 2013 numbered at 50 million barrels, with a production capacity of 21,000 bbl/d. The Yenangyaung oil field continues to be in operation.

The country has classified 51 onshore blocks and 53 offshore blocks, including 26 deep water blocks, for oil and gas exploration.

The National Energy Management Committee regulates the sector under the Ministry of Energy. The industry consists of three key state players:

- Myanma Oil and Gas Enterprise, created in 1963; responsible for exploration, production and domestic gas transmission through a 1,200-mile onshore pipeline network.
- Myanma Petrochemical Enterprise, operates small refineries and fertilizer plants
- Myanmar Petroleum Products Enterprise, responsible for retail and wholesale distribution of petroleum products

Major international oil companies (IOCs) engaged in Myanmar include TotalEnergies, the Essar Group, CNOOC, PTTEP, Petronas and Sinopec. After some of the sanctions were lifted in 2012, many international investors such as for instance British Gas, Chevron, ConocoPhillips, ENI, Oil India, Ophir, PetroVietnam, Shell, Statoil, and Woodside entered Myanmar's petroleum market.

Local companies such as Parami Energy Group and MPRL are some who are leading players in this field. According to Kwong Weng Yap, Chief Operating Officer of Parami, he said in a speech to the ASEAN community that the Myanmar oil and gas industry requires a clean government and local inclusion for it to be sustainable in the near term.

The downstream distribution network in Myanmar remains very under-developed with limited access to foreigners.

== Conflict and Controversy ==
The natural gas on shore extraction sites have been areas of continued human rights violations against local ethnic groups. The modern oil and gas reforms entrenched historical wealth inequality built on a legacy of corruption, ethnic inequality, and systemic sexism promoted through the Tatmadaw’s State and Peace Development Council (1988-2010), which resulted in 20 families re-branding themselves as Urban Elites seeking foreign investment during market liberalisation efforts around 2013. The scramble to open up Burma for business has played a direct role in inflaming community tensions. One of the most prominent culprits is the Shwe Gas Project led by South Korean and Indian companies, to export natural gas via pipeline from Arakan state to China's Yunnan province. The 2,800 km overland pipeline is slated to become operational this year.

The project plans to produce 500 million cubic feet (mcfd) of gas per day for 30 years, supplying 400 mcfd to China, and the remaining 100 mcfd to factories owned by the Burmese government, military and associated business elites.

The losers from this venture are the Burmese people and environment. An extensive report by the Shwe Gas Movement (SGM), a Burmese community-based human rights network, documented the destruction of local fishing and farming industries, including confiscation of thousands of acres of land to "clear areas for the pipeline and associated infrastructure", from 2010 to 2011. Tens of thousands have been left jobless, with little or no compensation or employment opportunities.

In 2021, a coup d'état took place, removing Aung San Suu Kyi with a military junta. In 4 February 2021, French oil multinational TotalEnergies (known as Total S.A. at the time) announced it was reviewing the impact of the coup on its domestic operations and projects. The company would later issue a statement on April that it would not withhold payments to the military junta and would not cease operations in its Yadana offshore gasfield. On 22 January 2022, TotalEnergies and Chevron would later announce its departure from Myanmar in response to the human rights abuses from the military junta. TotalEnergies also calls for sanctions in response to such actions in Myanmar.

== See also ==
- Economy of Burma
- Solar power in Burma
