= Monywa =

Monywa မုံရွာမြို့
- Capital Town
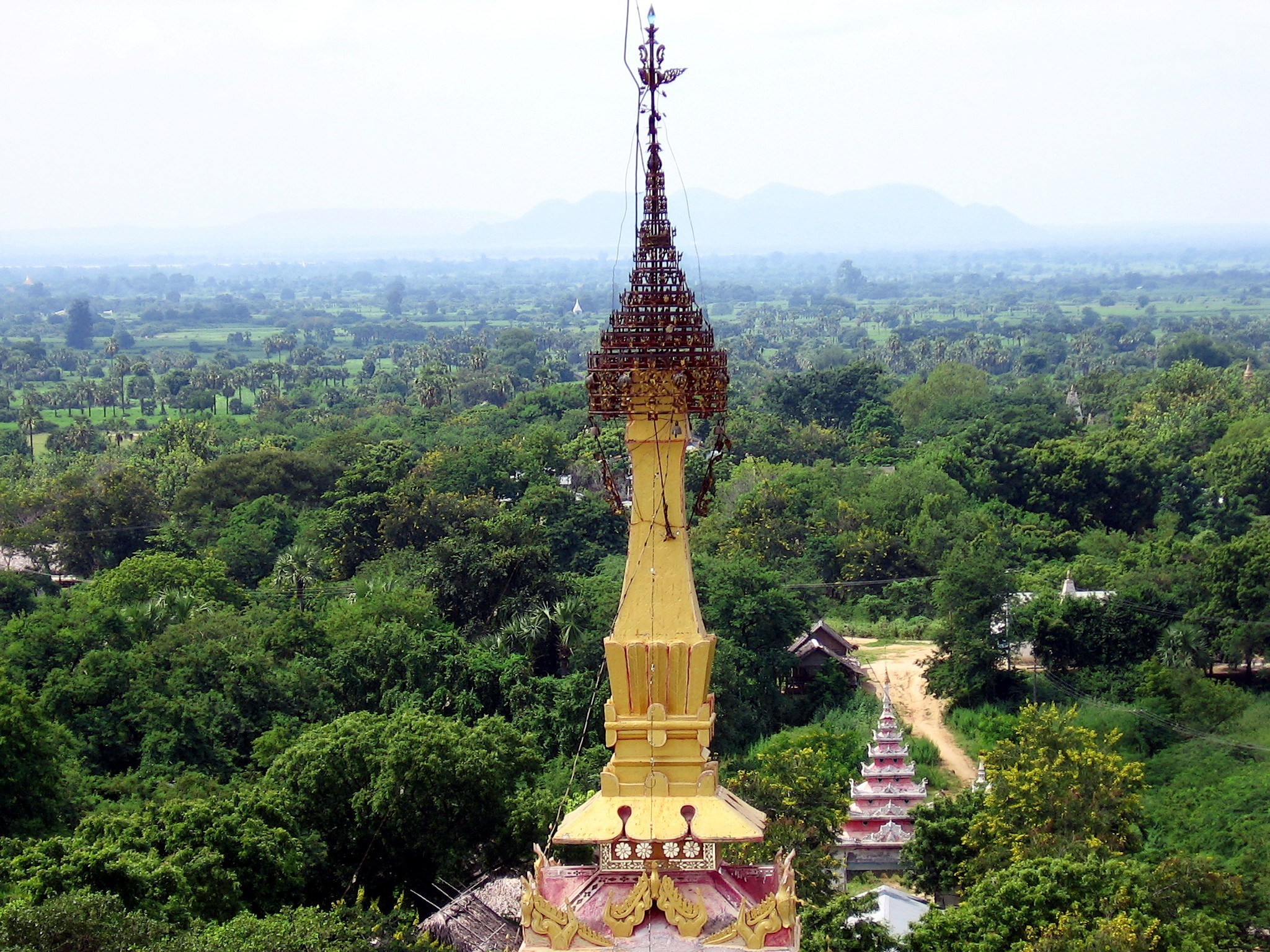
- Monywa

- Location in Myanmar
- Coordinates: 22°6′30″N 95°8′30″E
- Country: Myanmar
- Region: Sagaing Region
- District: Monywa District
- Township: Monywa Township

Government
  - Mayor: Dr. Thaung Naing (USDP)

Area
  - Capital Town: 27.56 sq mi (71.39 km^{2})

Population (2024)
  - Capital Town: 149,582
  - Density: 5,427/sq mi (2,095/km^{2})
  - Urban: 237,751
  - Rural: 164,606
  - Religions: Buddhism
- Time zone: UTC+6.30 (MMT)
- Area code: 71

Monywa (Burmese: မုံရွာမြို့, MLCTS: muṃ rwa mrui.; pronounced [mòʊɰ̃jwà mjo̰]) is a city in Sagaing Region, Myanmar, located 136 kilometres (85 mi) north-west of Mandalay on the eastern bank of the River Chindwin. Monywa is one of the most economically important cities in Myanmar. It is also known as 'Neem City' because many of the city's streets are lined with neem trees.

== Climate ==
Monywa and neighbouring parts of the “Dry Valley” are the only places in Southeast Asia where the hot semi-arid climate (Köppen BSh) occurs. The city misses the tropical savanna climate (Köppen Aw) classification due to the very high temperatures and resultant high evaporation levels, alongside a long dry season. The semi-aridity has to do with the “Dry Valley” being located in the rain shadow of the Arakan Mountains. Temperatures are very high throughout the year, although the winter months from December to February are significantly milder at around 21 °C or 69.8 °F in January. The early monsoon months from April to July are especially hot, with average high temperatures reaching 38.4 °C (101.1 °F) in April.

Monywa received 139 millimetres or 5.47 inches of rainfall on 19 October 2011. This was a new record for rainfall within 24 hours in October in Monywa for the last 47 years. The previous record was 135 millimetres or 5.31 inches on 24 October 1967.

Climate data for Monywa (1991–2020)
Month	Jan	Feb	Mar	Apr	May	Jun	Jul	Aug	Sep	Oct	Nov	Dec	Year
Record high °C (°F)	34.6 (94.3)	39.3 (102.7)	43.5 (110.3)	44.8 (112.6)	45.7 (114.3)	43.5 (110.3)	43.0 (109.4)	41.0 (105.8)	38.9 (102.0)	39.4 (102.9)	37.4 (99.3)	34.0 (93.2)	45.7 (114.3)
Mean daily maximum °C (°F)	29.2 (84.6)	33.0 (91.4)	37.0 (98.6)	39.4 (102.9)	38.1 (100.6)	36.4 (97.5)	36.2 (97.2)	35.0 (95.0)	34.1 (93.4)	32.9 (91.2)	31.3 (88.3)	28.9 (84.0)	34.3 (93.7)
Daily mean °C (°F)	21.5 (70.7)	24.4 (75.9)	28.2 (82.8)	31.4 (88.5)	31.7 (89.1)	31.1 (88.0)	31.1 (88.0)	30.3 (86.5)	29.5 (85.1)	28.2 (82.8)	25.4 (77.7)	22.1 (71.8)	27.9 (82.2)
Mean daily minimum °C (°F)	13.9 (57.0)	15.8 (60.4)	19.4 (66.9)	23.5 (74.3)	25.4 (77.7)	25.9 (78.6)	25.9 (78.6)	25.5 (77.9)	24.9 (76.8)	23.5 (74.3)	19.5 (67.1)	15.3 (59.5)	21.5 (70.7)
Record low °C (°F)	7.2 (45.0)	11.0 (51.8)	11.8 (53.2)	17.1 (62.8)	20.0 (68.0)	20.2 (68.4)	22.8 (73.0)	21.0 (69.8)	20.4 (68.7)	17.6 (63.7)	12.0 (53.6)	8.3 (46.9)	7.2 (45.0)
Average precipitation mm (inches)	2.9 (0.11)	1.3 (0.05)	7.0 (0.28)	31.5 (1.24)	97.5 (3.84)	80.6 (3.17)	62.4 (2.46)	121.6 (4.79)	172.3 (6.78)	135.8 (5.35)	23.3 (0.92)	3.6 (0.14)	739.8 (29.13)
Average precipitation days (≥ 1.0 mm)	0.4	0.5	0.8	3.4	8.5	6.6	6.3	9.3	10.3	8.8	1.9	0.7	57.5
Source 1: World Meteorological Organization
Source 2: Norwegian Meteorological Institute (extremes), Meteomanz(record)

== Capital status ==
All government offices of Sagaing Region are located in Monywa, including the regional parliament. The town is generally recognized as the capital of the region.

However, groups including the civil society group "Steering Committee for the Return of All Regional Offices to Sagaing City in Accordance with the Constitution" object to this, stating that the use of Monywa as the regional capital is unconstitutional per the 2008 Constitution of Myanmar.

== Culture ==
Monywa is a national hub for poets, and is often described as the center of poetry in Upper Myanmar. The town has served as home to many contemporary poets, including Min Swe Hnit, K Za Win, Kyi Zaw Aye, and Khat Thi.

== Transport ==
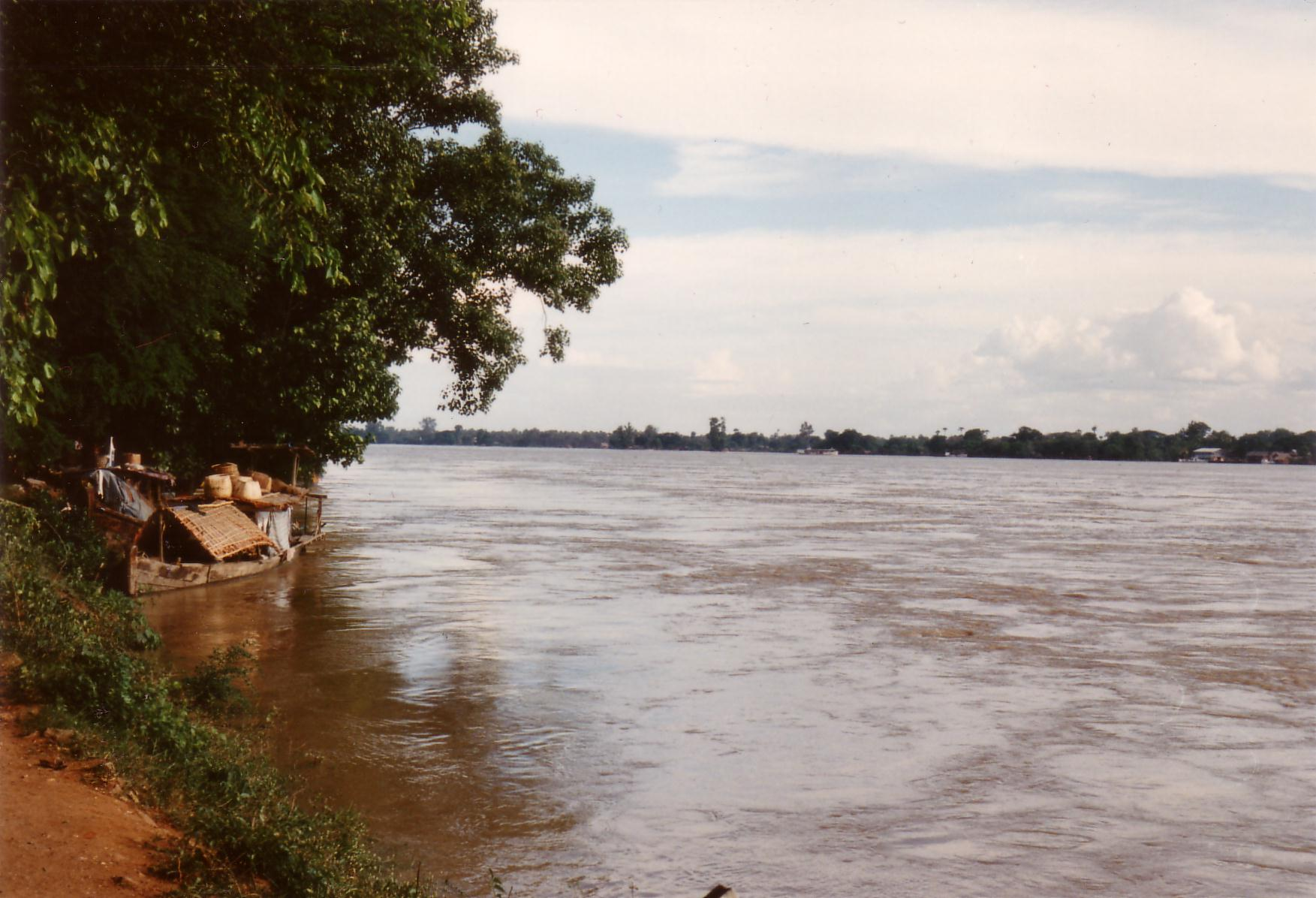
River Chindwin at Monywa

Monywa is served by the Mandalay-Budalin branch railway line, but is best reached by bus as the road from Mandalay is in reasonably good shape. Monywa is linked by road to Budalin, Dabayin, Ye-U and Kin-U, and by rail to Sagaing and the Mandalay - Myitkyina line. River transport on the Chindwin has always been important as it is navigable for 640 km (400 mi) to Hkamti during the monsoon season, and most of the year to Homalin. Monywa Airport also serves the area.

== Economy ==
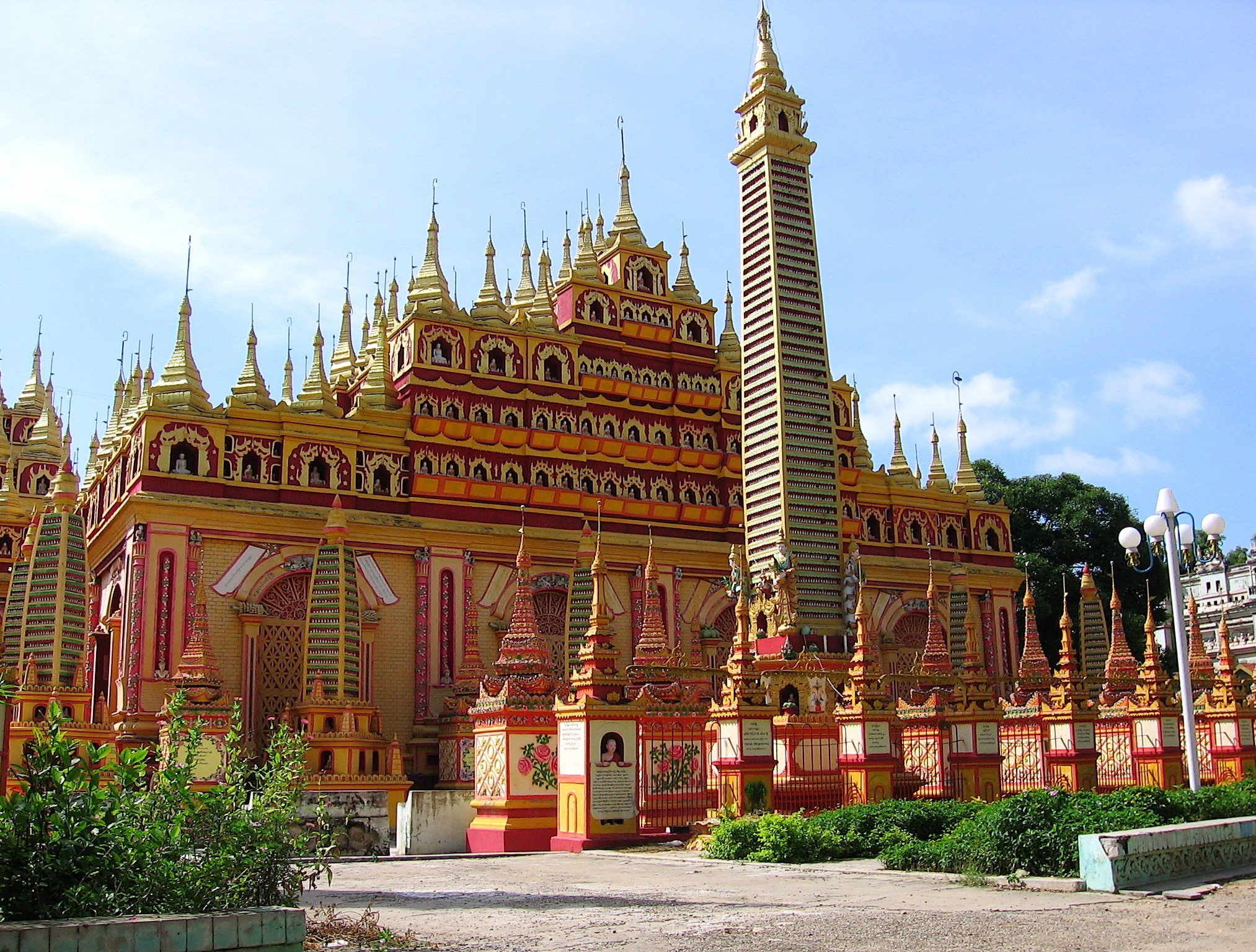
Thanboddhay Pagoda

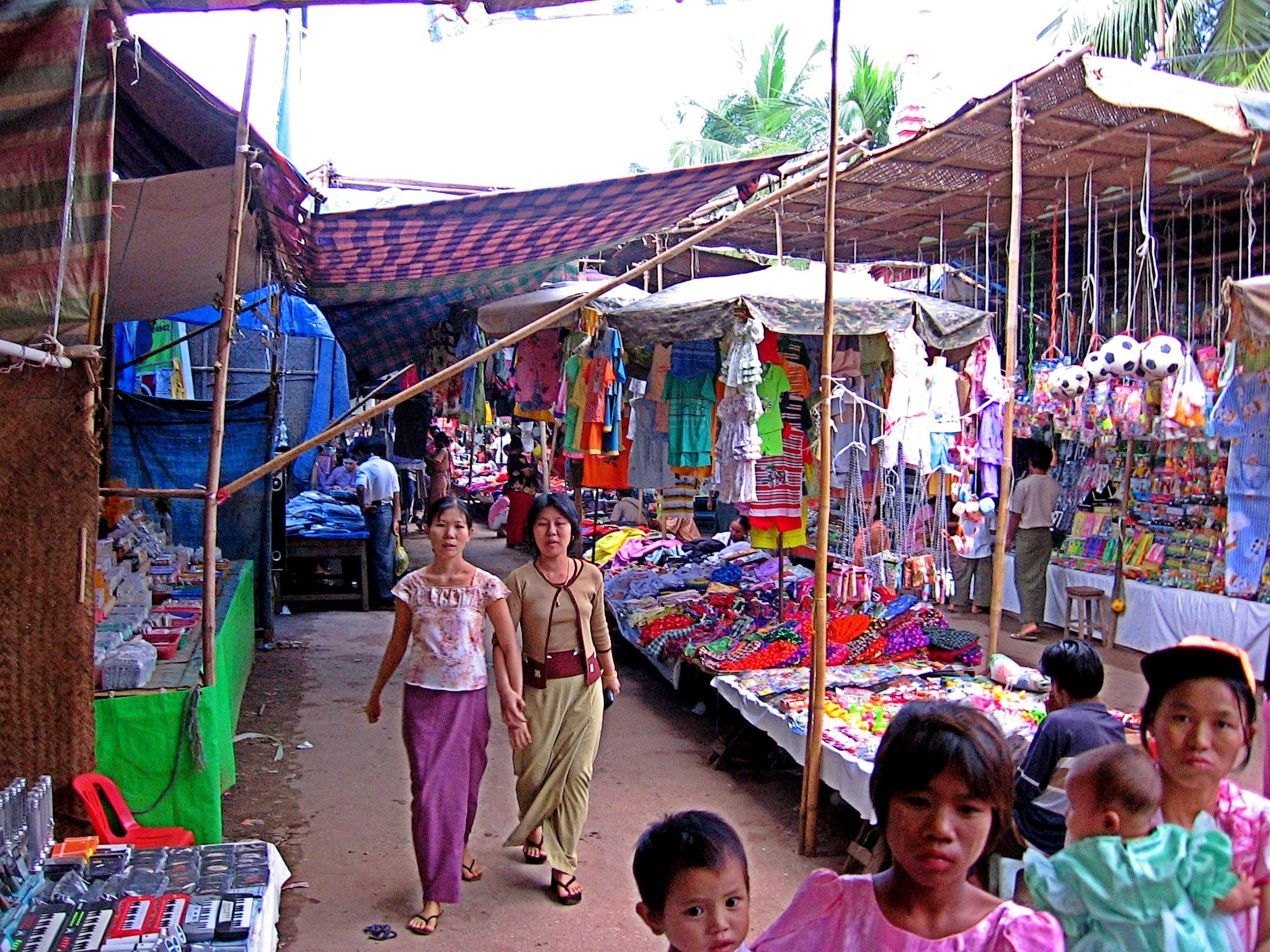
Market

Monywa is a major centre for trade and commerce and for agricultural produce from the surrounding Chindwin valley, especially beans, oranges, pulses and jaggery (palm sugar). In addition, the local industry includes mills for the production of cotton, flour, noodles, and edible oil. Sausages from Alon called wet udaunk are quite popular, and Budalin longyi (sarong) is known for the strength of the fabric and its checked patterns. Monywa's rough cotton blankets are famous throughout Myanmar (with Monywa providing 80% of the country's blankets for a century), and some can be found sewn up into knapsacks sold to unsuspecting tourists in Bangkok. Other regional crafts include bamboo and reed products, bullock carts and agricultural implements. The village of Kyaukka is well known for its lacquerware utensils for everyday use.

Black market goods from India, especially saris and bicycle parts, pass through Monywa on their way to other parts of Myanmar.

== Attractions ==
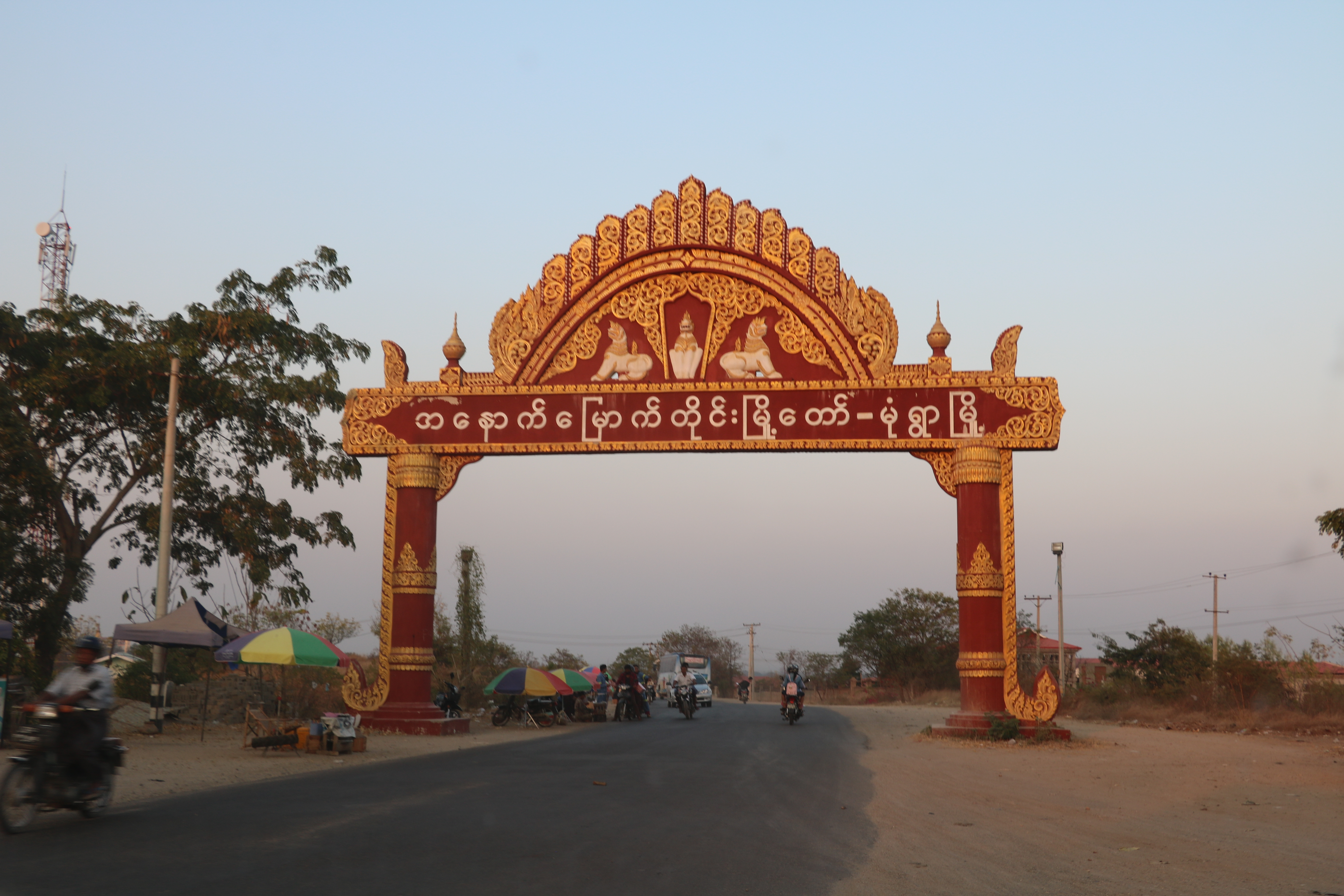
Entrance to Monywa

The major tourist attraction in Monywa is Thambuddhe Pagoda, a Buddhist temple with a huge stupa resembling Indonesia's Borobudur. It dates from 1303, although it was reconstructed in 1939. It is said to contain over 500,000 images of Buddha. Close by is the Maha Bodhi Tahtaung Laykyun Sekkya standing Buddha statue, the 3rd tallest statue in the world, at 115.82 metres (a total of 129.23 metres, including the pedestal). This is the focal point of a sprawling site filled with Buddha statues, bodhi trees, and pagodas, established by the Maha Bodhi Ta Htaung Sayadaw in the 1960s. It includes also a 95-metre long reclining Buddha statue.

Another attraction is the Phowintaung cave complex across the Chindwin River, approximately 25 kilometres (16 mi) west of Monywa.

Nyaung-gan Bronze Age cemetery, dated to between 1,500 BCE and 500 BCE, in Budalin with bronze tools, ceramics and stone artifacts is 60 minutes travel on a narrow road north of Monywa.

Very few tourists visit Monywa as its facilities are limited.

== Education ==
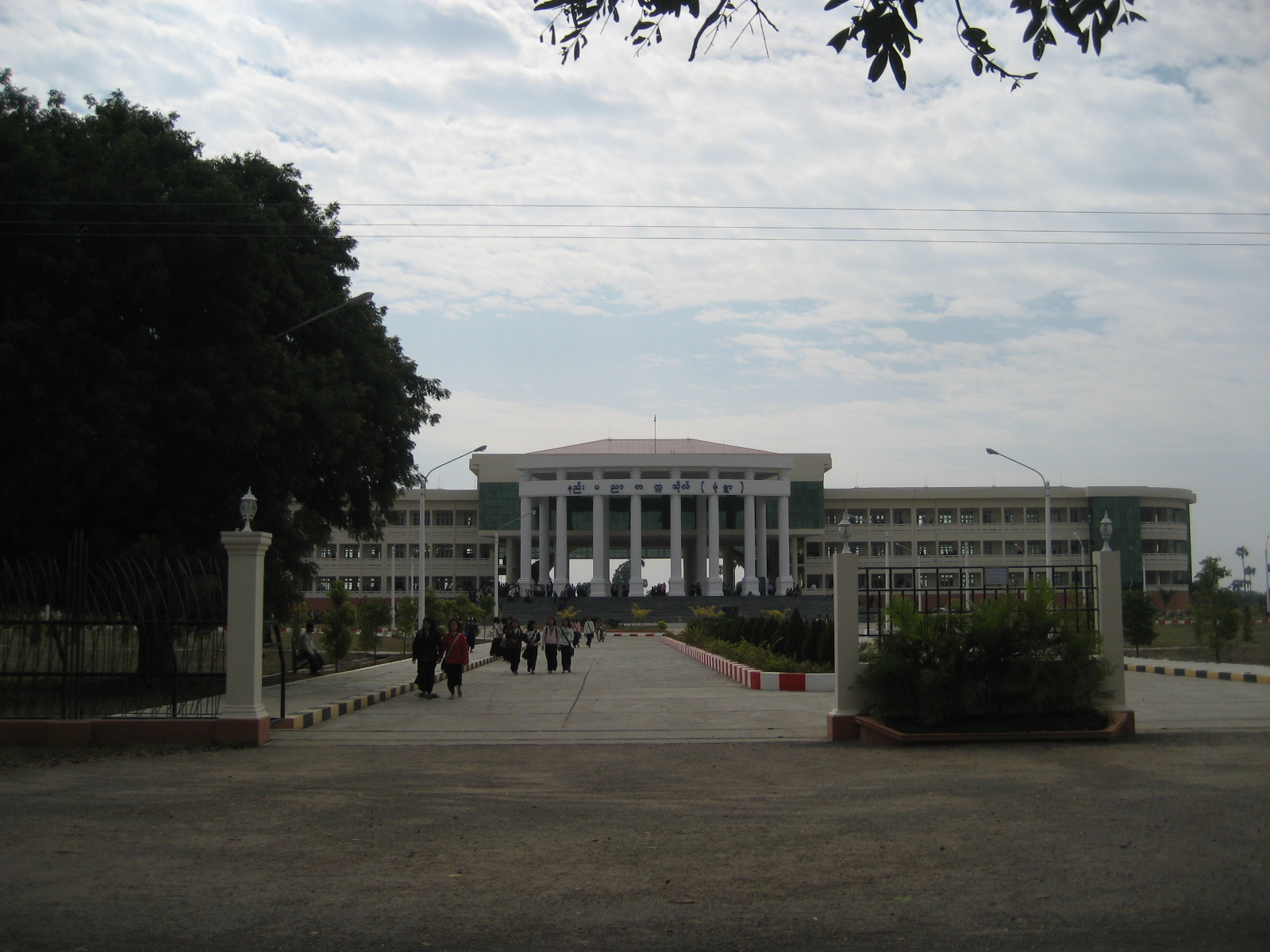
Technological University (Monywa)

The city is home to several higher education institutions:

1. Monywa University
2. Monywa Education College
3. Monywa University of Economics
4. Technological University, Monywa
5. Computer University, Monywa

== Healthcare ==
Monywa has two public hospitals:

- Monywa General Hospital
- Monywa Women and Children Hospital

== Politics ==
The insurgent Burmese Communist Party (BCP) was centred in the Monywa area (west of the Chindwin River) for many years. The Myanmar military presence in Monywa remains heavy.

== Notable residents ==
- Thant Sin Maung
- Tun Kyi
- Kyaw Hsan
- U Lu Tin

== Gallery ==
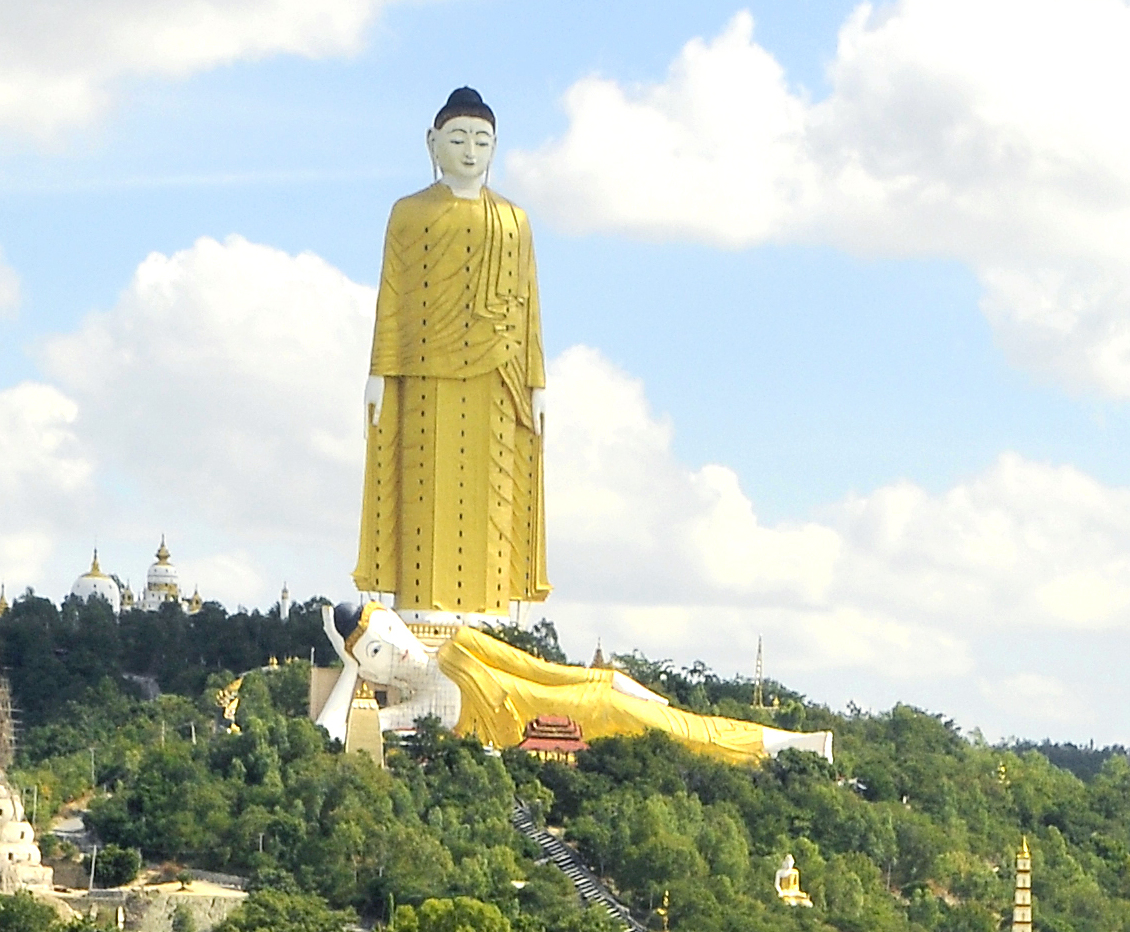
Giant reclining Buddha at Bodhi Tahtaung

Giant standing Buddha (under construction in the first picture)

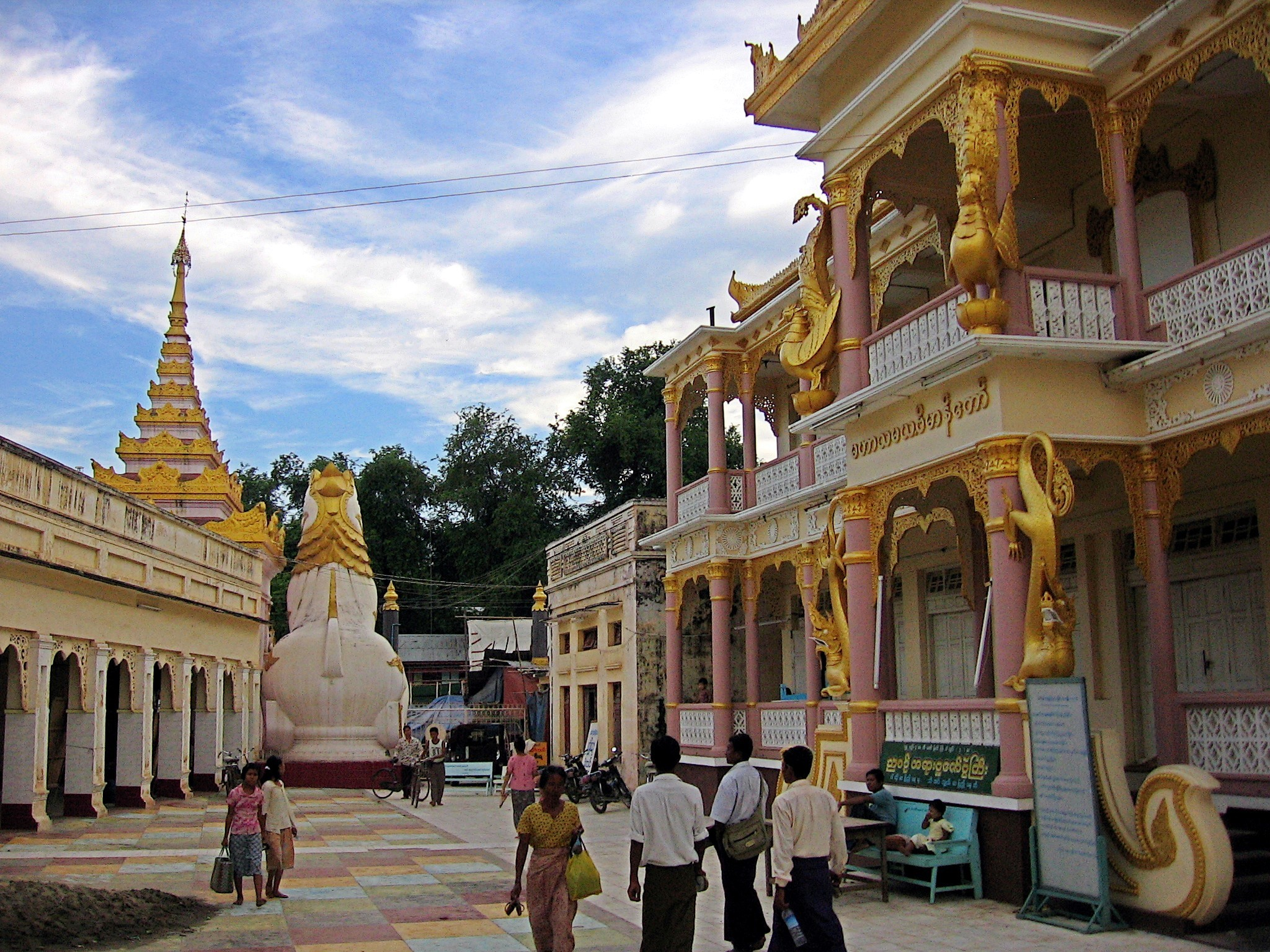
Shwezigon-Paya

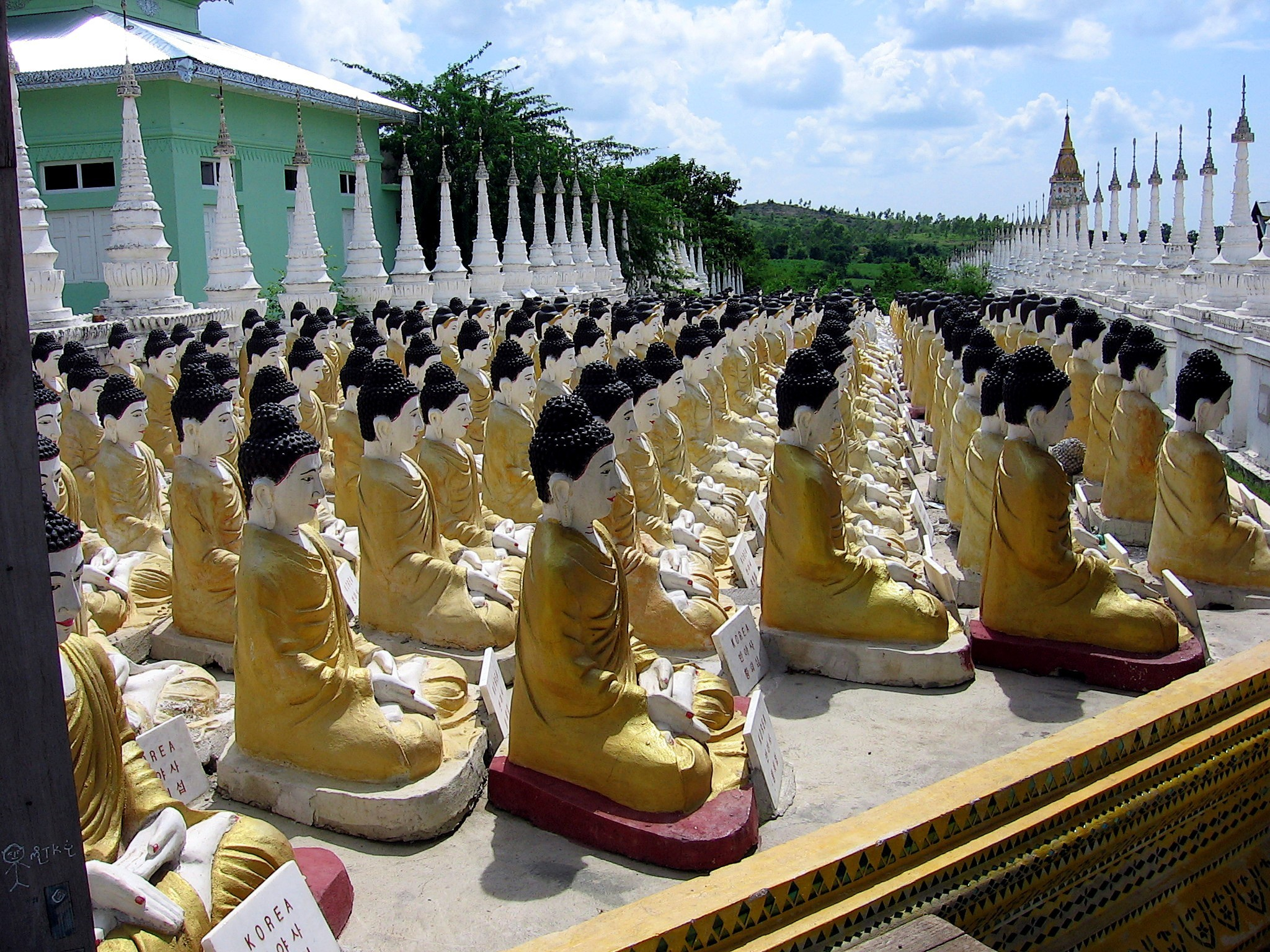
Aung Setkya Paya
