= Zeya Aung =

Military officer and a former Minister of Construction

- ဇေယျာအောင်

Minister of Energy
- In office July 2013 – 30 March 2016
- Preceded by: Than Htay
- Succeeded by: Aung San Suu Kyi

Minister for Communications and Information Technology
- In office 14 August 2015 – 30 March 2016
- Preceded by: Myat Hein
- Succeeded by: Thant Zin Maung

Minister of Rail Transportation
- In office September 2012 – July 2013
- Preceded by: Aung Min
- Succeeded by: Than Htay

Personal details
- Relations: Ye Htut; Jonathan Kyaw Thaung

Military service
- Allegiance: Myanmar
- Branch/service: Myanmar Army
- Rank: Major-General

Major-General Zeya Aung (Burmese: ဇေယျာအောင်; also spelt Zeyar Aung and Zayar Aung) is a military officer and a former Minister of Construction. He was appointed by President Thein Sein in August 2013, following the transfer of his predecessor, Than Htay, by presidential order, on 25 July 2013. He previously served as Minister of Rail Transportation from September 2012 to July 2013.

== Military career ==
A military officer, Zeya Aung graduated from the 23rd intake of the Defence Services Academy.

In 2007, he was appointed as commandant of the Defence Services Academy. He served as a commander of the Northern Command from August 2010 to September 2012, as well as a former Commander of the Light Infantry Division (LID) 88.

== Personal life ==
Zeya Aung is the brother-in-law of Ye Htut, and an uncle of Jonathan Kyaw Thaung of the KT Group, a local conglomerate.
