= K Za Win =

Burmese poet

- ကိုကေဇဝင်း
- Born: Chanthar Swe; 1982; Letpadaung, Burma
- Died: 3 March 2021 (aged 38–39); Monywa, Myanmar
- Occupations: Poet; Buddhist monk

K Za Win (Burmese: ကိုကေဇဝင်း; 1982 – 3 March 2021) was a Burmese poet and former Buddhist monk, best known for his collection of long-form poems, My Reply to Ramon.

== Early life and education ==
K Za Win was born Chanthar Swe (ချမ်းသာဆွေ) in 1982 in the town of Letpadaung, Sagaing Division, Burma to a peasant family. His family lost land to the Letpadaung Copper Mine, a Chinese-owned mine.

== Career ==
He published his first poem at the age of 16, in a school magazine. K Za Win became an activist, involved in educational reform and land rights. He participated in student-led protests to reform Myanmar's educational system, in opposition to the Myanmar National Education Law 2014. On 10 March 2015, he was jailed at Tharrawaddy Prison for over a year. He was a member of the Monywa Poet's Union.

In the aftermath of the 2021 Myanmar coup d'état, he organised anti-coup demonstrations in Monywa. On 3 March, security forces killed him by gunfire, after firing at a crowd of protesters in Monywa. He became one of at least four prominent poets, alongside Myint Myint Zin, Khet Thi, and Sein Win, to be killed that month.
