= Myat Hein =

Burmese politician and general

- မြတ်ဟိန်း
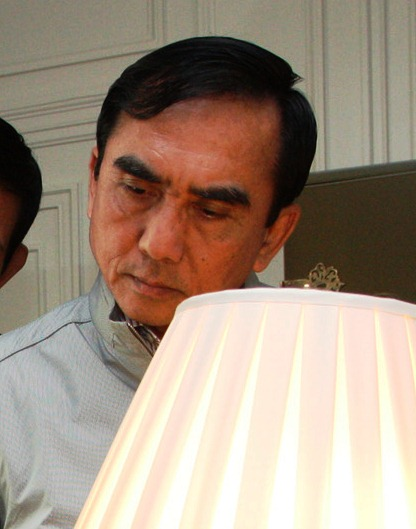
- Myat Hein in 2013

Member-elect of the Pyithu Hluttaw for Dakkhinathiri, Naypyidaw
- Assuming office 16 March 2026
- Succeeding: Vacant

Commander-in-Chief of the Air Forces of Myanmar
- In office 2003 – 13 February 2013

Minister for Communications and Information Technology
- In office 13 February 2013 – 12 August 2015
- Preceded by: Thein Tun (as Minister for Communications, Posts and Telegraphs)
- Succeeded by: Zeya Aung

Vice-Chairman of the Union Solidarity and Development Party
- Incumbent
- Assumed office 23 August 2016 Serving with Khin Yi (2019–2022)
- Chairman: Than Htay (2016–2022); Khin Yi (since 2022)
- Preceded by: Shwe Mann; Htay Oo; Aye Myint

Personal details
- Born: 27 April 1955 (age 71) Pegu, Pegu Division, Burma
- Party: Union Solidarity and Development Party
- Spouse: Htwe Htwe Nyunt
- Education: Defence Services Academy

Military service
- Allegiance: Myanmar
- Branch/service: Myanmar Air Force
- Years of service: 1975 – 2013
- Rank: General

General Myat Hein (Burmese: မြတ်ဟိန်း; born 27 April 1955) is a Burmese politician and former military official who served as the Minister for Communications and Information Technology from 2013 to 2015 and commander-in-chief of the Myanmar Air Force. He has served as Vice Chairman of the Union Solidarity and Development Party since August 2016, and is a member-elect of the Pyithu Hluttaw.

== Early life and education ==
Myat Hein was born on 27 April 1955 in Pegu, Pegu Division, Burma. He earned a master's degree from the Defence Services Academy.

== Military and governmental career ==
During 2001, Myat Hein held the rank of colonel and served as Chief of Staff (Air). The following year, Myat Hein remained as Chief of Staff (Air), and was promoted to brigadier general. By 2003 he had been appointed Commander-in-Chief (Air) and held the rank of major general. During his time as the Air Force commander, Myat Hein has maintained close links with China and India.

On 13 February 2013, he retired from the military and became Minister of Communications and Information Technology. The European Union has ordered that Myat Hein's funds be frozen inside its jurisdiction.

On 23 August 2016, he was elected vice-chairman of the Union Solidarity and Development Party, preceded by three deputy-chairman Shwe Mann, Htay Oo and Aye Myint, replacing former president Thein Sein.

Myat Hein ran and was elected as the USDP candidate for Pyithu Hluttaw in Dakkhinathiri Township, Naypyidaw Union Territory, in the 2025–26 Myanmar general election, considered a sham process by independent observers.

== Personal life ==
Myat Hain is married to Htwe Htwe Nyunt.

Military offices
Preceded by Myint Swe	Commander-in-Chief (Air) of the Myanmar Air Force c. 2003 - 2013	Succeeded by Khin Aung Myint
