= Myo Myint Oo =

Myanmar politician

U Myo Myint Oo is currently the Union Minister of the Ministry of Energy of Myanmar. He was appointed by State Administration Council on August 5, 2022. Before being appointed to this position, U Myo Myint Oo was the Ministry of Energy and the Ministry of Electricity and Energy. He served as the managing director of Myanmar's oil and natural gas industry.

U Myo Myint Oo is a graduate of Yangon University. He received his bachelor's degree in geology in 1981. After that, he obtained his master's degree from the University of Thailand. U Myo Myint Oo attended the cadet course and retired as a major and moved to Myanmar's oil and natural gas industry as a government employee. On August 22, 2013, he was promoted from the position of director (offshore) of Myanmar Oil and Natural Gas Industry to a probationary director, and on August 28, 2014, he was confirmed and appointed as a leading director. He retired as an employee on June 23, 2020.
