= Ministry of Electricity and Energy =

Ministry of Electricity and Energy may refer to:

- Ministry of Electricity and Energy (Egypt)
- Ministry of Electricity and Energy (Myanmar)
