= Than Htay =

Burmese politician

- သန်းဌေး
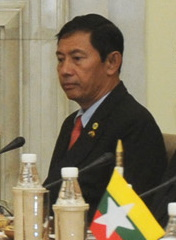
- Than Htay in 2011

Chairman of the Union Solidarity and Development Party
- In office 23 August 2016 – 12 September 2022
- Vice Chairman: Myat Hein (2016–2022); Khin Yi (2019–2022)
- Preceded by: Thein Sein
- Succeeded by: Khin Yi

Minister of Rail Transportation of Myanmar
- In office 25 July 2013 – 12 August 2015
- Preceded by: Zayar Aung

Minister of Energy of Myanmar
- In office 30 March 2011 – 25 July 2013
- Preceded by: Lun Thi
- Succeeded by: Zayar Aung

Member of the Pyithu Hluttaw
- In office 31 January 2011 – 30 March 2011
- Preceded by: Constituency established
- Succeeded by: Kyaw Myint (NLD)
- Constituency: Myanaung Township
- Majority: 81,996 (76.99%)

Deputy Minister of Energy of Myanmar
- In office 2010 – 30 March 2011

Personal details
- Born: 12 November 1954 (age 71) Myanaung Township, Burma
- Party: Union Solidarity and Development Party
- Spouse: Soe Wut Yee
- Education: Defence Services Academy

Military service
- Allegiance: Myanmar
- Branch/service: Myanmar Army
- Years of service: –2010
- Rank: Brigadier general

Than Htay (Burmese: သန်းဌေး; born 12 November 1954) is a Burmese politician who served as Chairman of the Union Solidarity and Development Party from August 2016 to September 2022, with his tenure ending due to medical treatment. He previously served as the Minister for Rail Transportation, and Minister for Energy. He is a retired brigadier general in the Myanmar Army.

== Early life ==
Than Htay was born on 12 November 1954 in Ayeyarwady Region. When he was 17, he was accepted into the Defence Services Academy and earned a bachelor of arts and a master’s degree in defense.

== Military and political career ==
Serving in the military until 2010, he peaked as a brigadier general. He left the army at the rank of brigadier general in 2003 to become deputy minister of energy, before being promoted to minister in 2011.

He joined the Union Solidarity and Development Party at its founding in the lead-up to the 2010 election. He won election to the Pyithu Hluttaw, representing Myanaung township, in the 2012 by-election. In 2013, he became minister for energy and for railways. In January 2013, his ministry awarded two new deep-water oil and gas blocks to Thai energy firm PTT Exploration and Production without using a bidding process. The ministry also approved MPRL E&P to extend its contract without a bidding process to operate the Mann oil field in central Myanmar. Due to his controversial decisions over the awarding of exploration licenses and production concessions as a minister, Than Htay was transferred to the Ministry of Rail Transportation on 25 July 2013. He resigned from the post after Thein Sein picked him as a USDP candidate for the 2015 general election.

He publicly supported the controversial Protection of Race and Religion Laws — a set of four laws to regulate religious conversion and population-control measures that passed under sustained lobbying from ultra-nationalist groups.

In November 2015, he ran for re-election but was defeated. In the 2020 Myanmar general election, he won a House of Representatives seat representing Naypyitaw's Zeyathiri Township. He served as Chairman of the Union Solidarity and Development Party from August 2016 to September 2022, with his tenure ending due to medical treatment.

== Personal life ==
Than Htay is married to Soe Wut Yee.
