= Thanboddhay Pagoda =

Buddhist temple in Monywa, Myanmar

Coordinates: 22°07′N 95°09′E

- သမ္ဗုဒ္ဓေဘုုရား
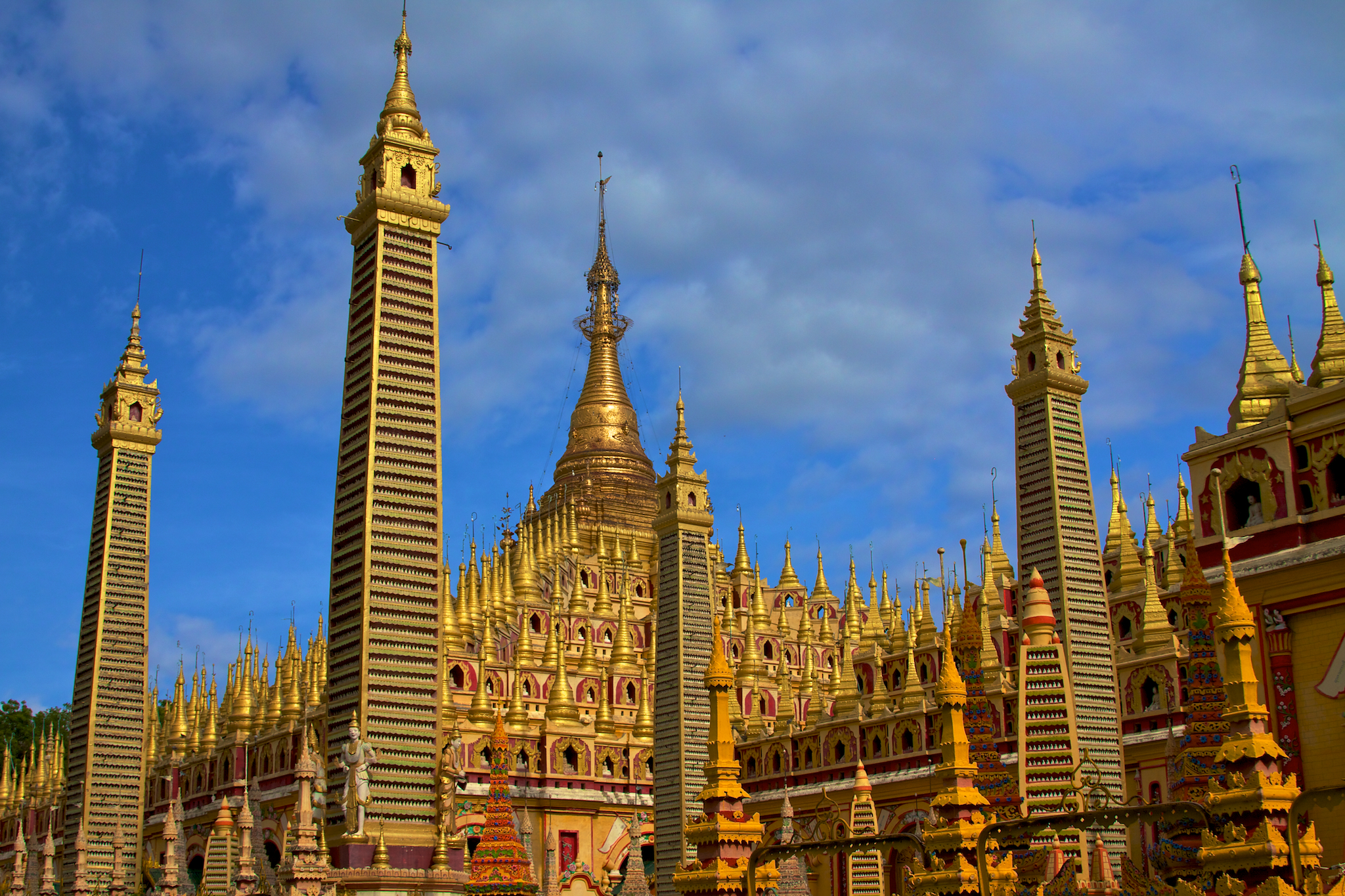
- View of the Temple

- Location within Myanmar

Religion
- Affiliation: Theravada

Location
- Country: Myanmar

Thanboddhay Pagoda (Burmese: သမ္ဗုဒ္ဓေဘုုရား) also known as Sambuddhe Pagoda (သမ္ဗုဒ္ဓေစေတီ) is a Buddhist temple complex located in Monywa, in the Sagaing Region. It has a vibrant architecture with over 580,000 Buddha images and is one of the most distinctive and visited religious sites in the country. The pagoda was constructed between 1939 and 1952.

== History ==
The construction of the pagoda began under the direction of the monk Thambuddhei Sayadaw, who was inspired by the architectural style of Borobudur in Indonesia. Construction began on June 20, 1939, on a site that previously housed a 14th-century monastery of which no remnants remain. The project was funded by local devotees and completed on March 2, 1952. During World War II, the temple grounds provided shelter for thousands of refugees fleeing conflict.

== Photo gallery ==
Thambuddhe Pagoda - သမ္ဗုဒ္ဓေဘုုရား

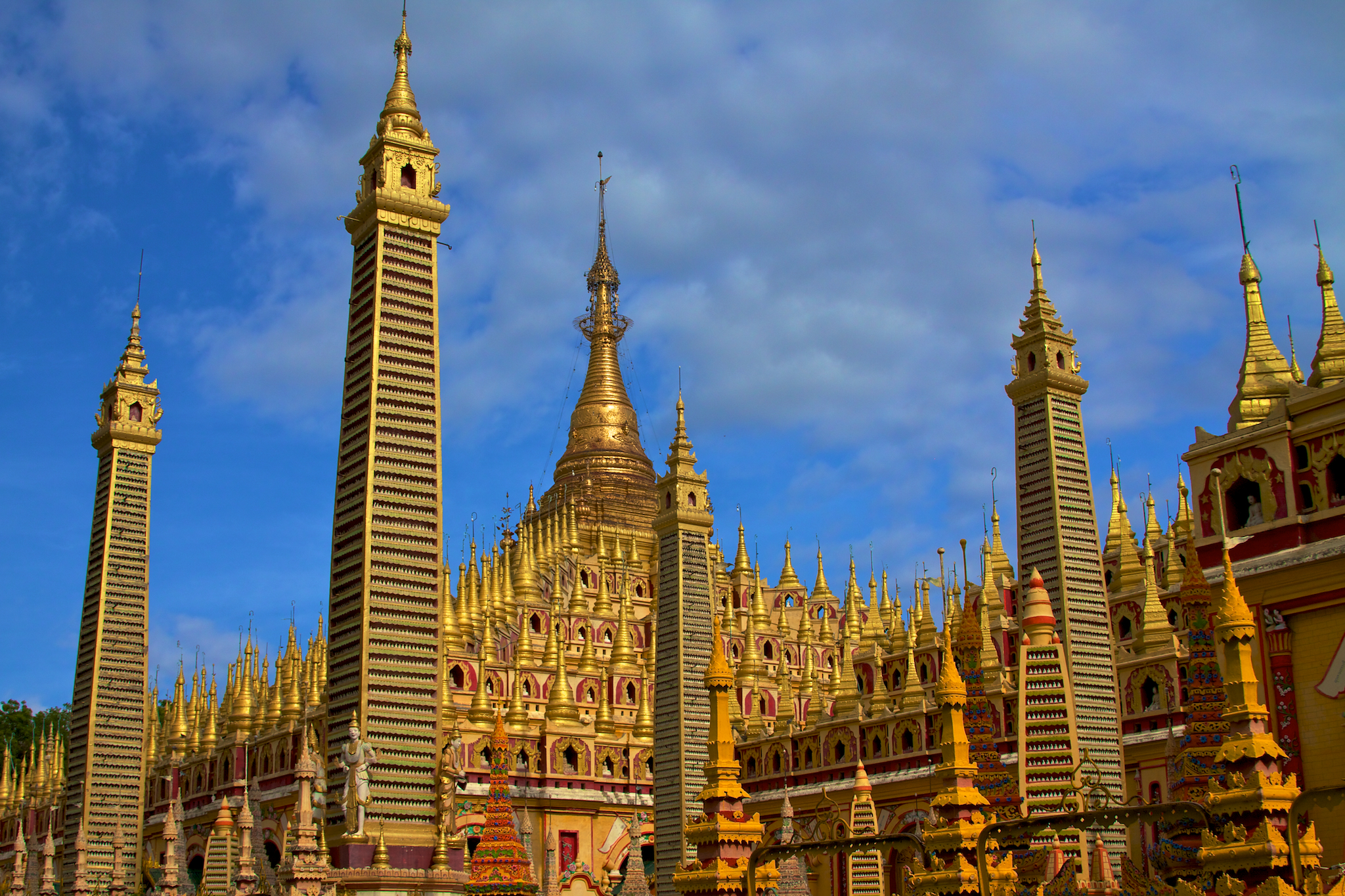

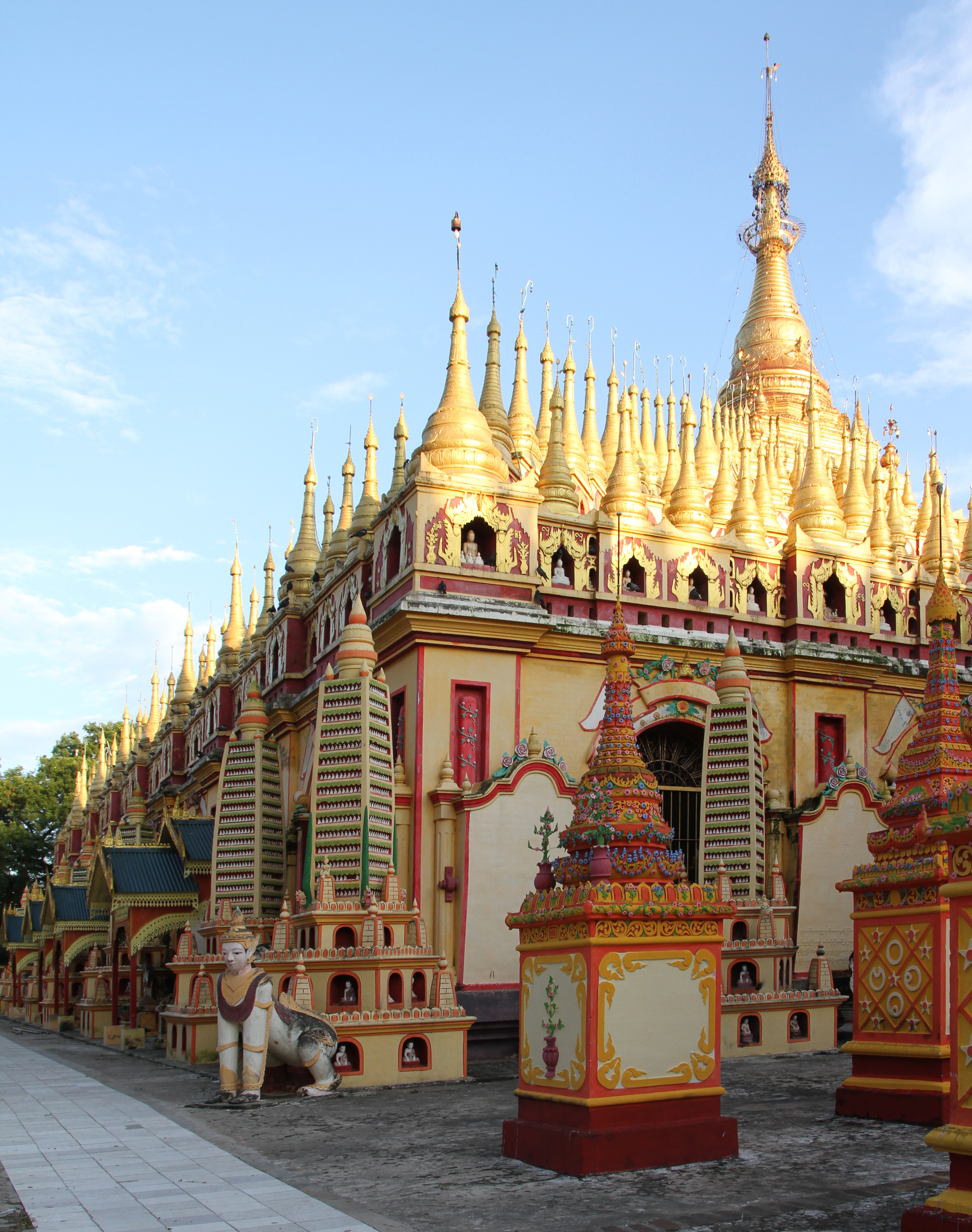

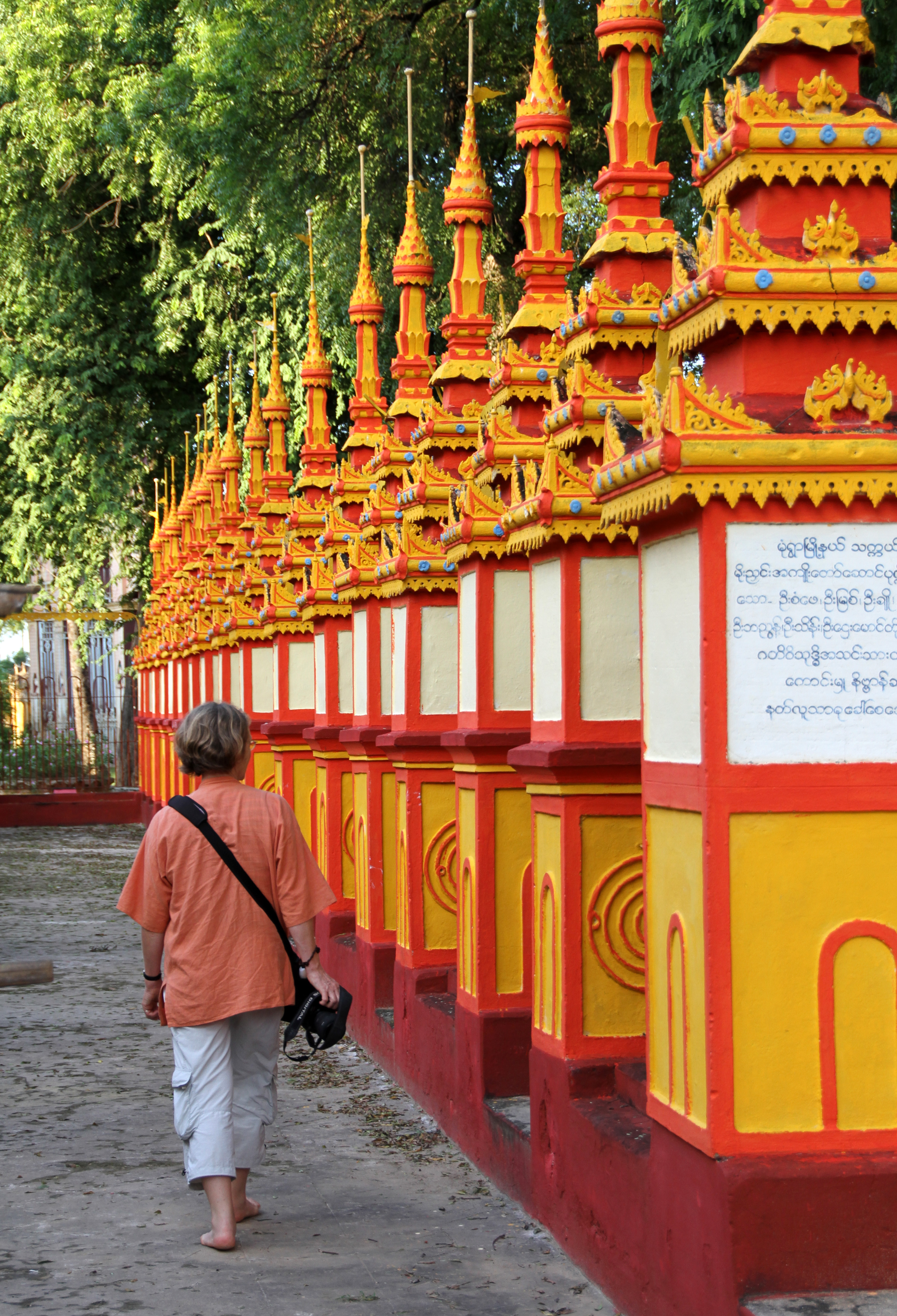

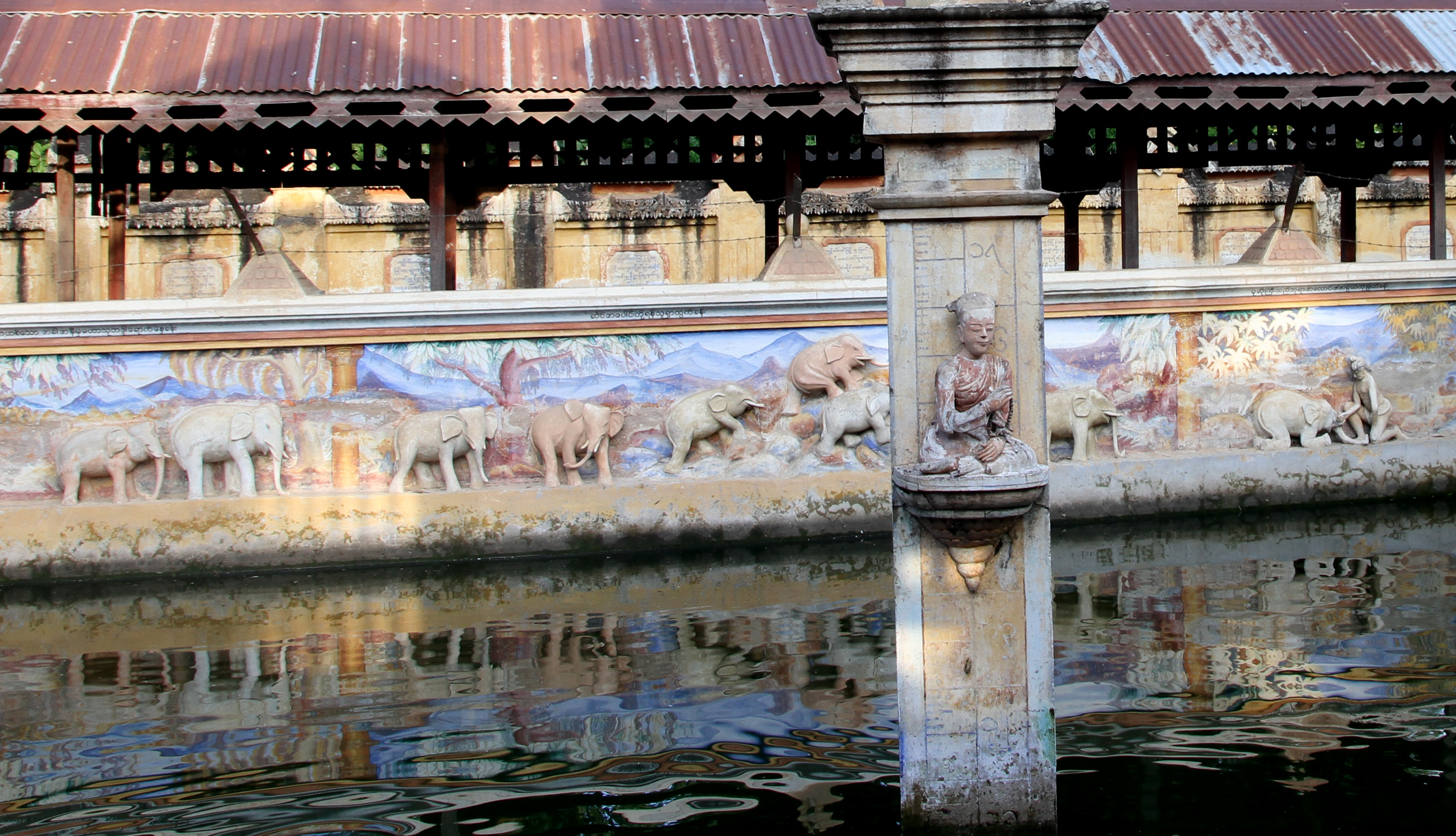

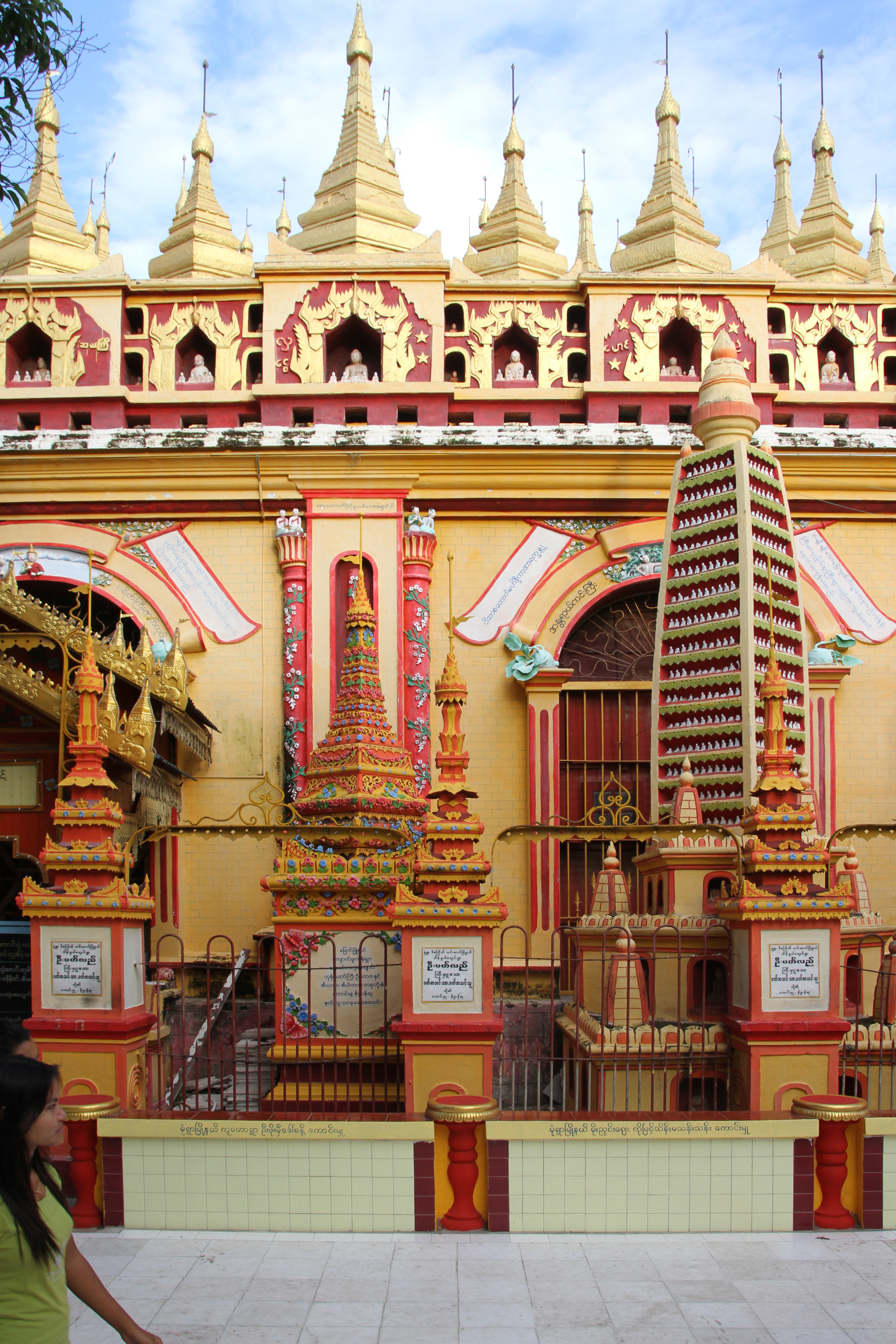

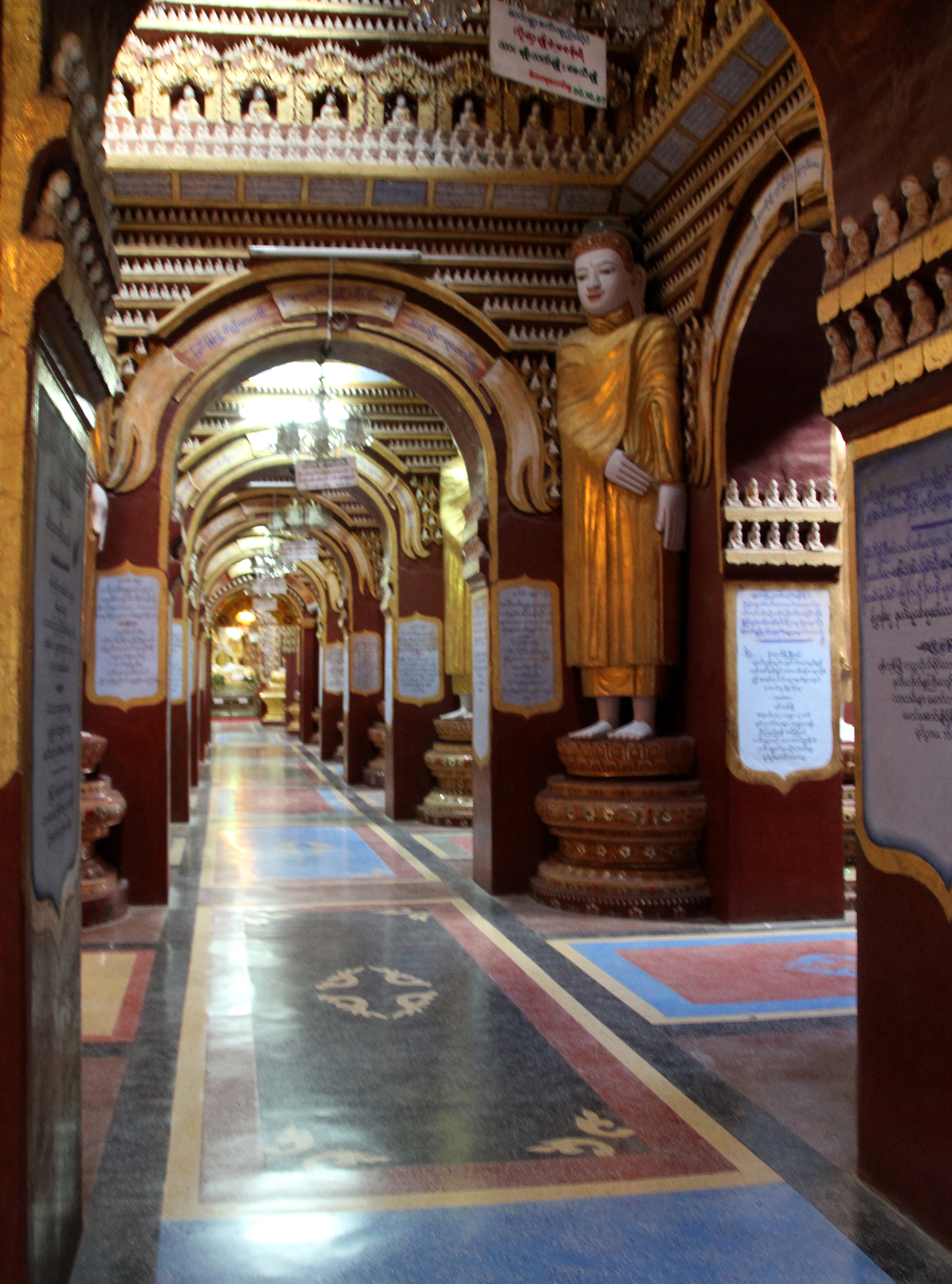

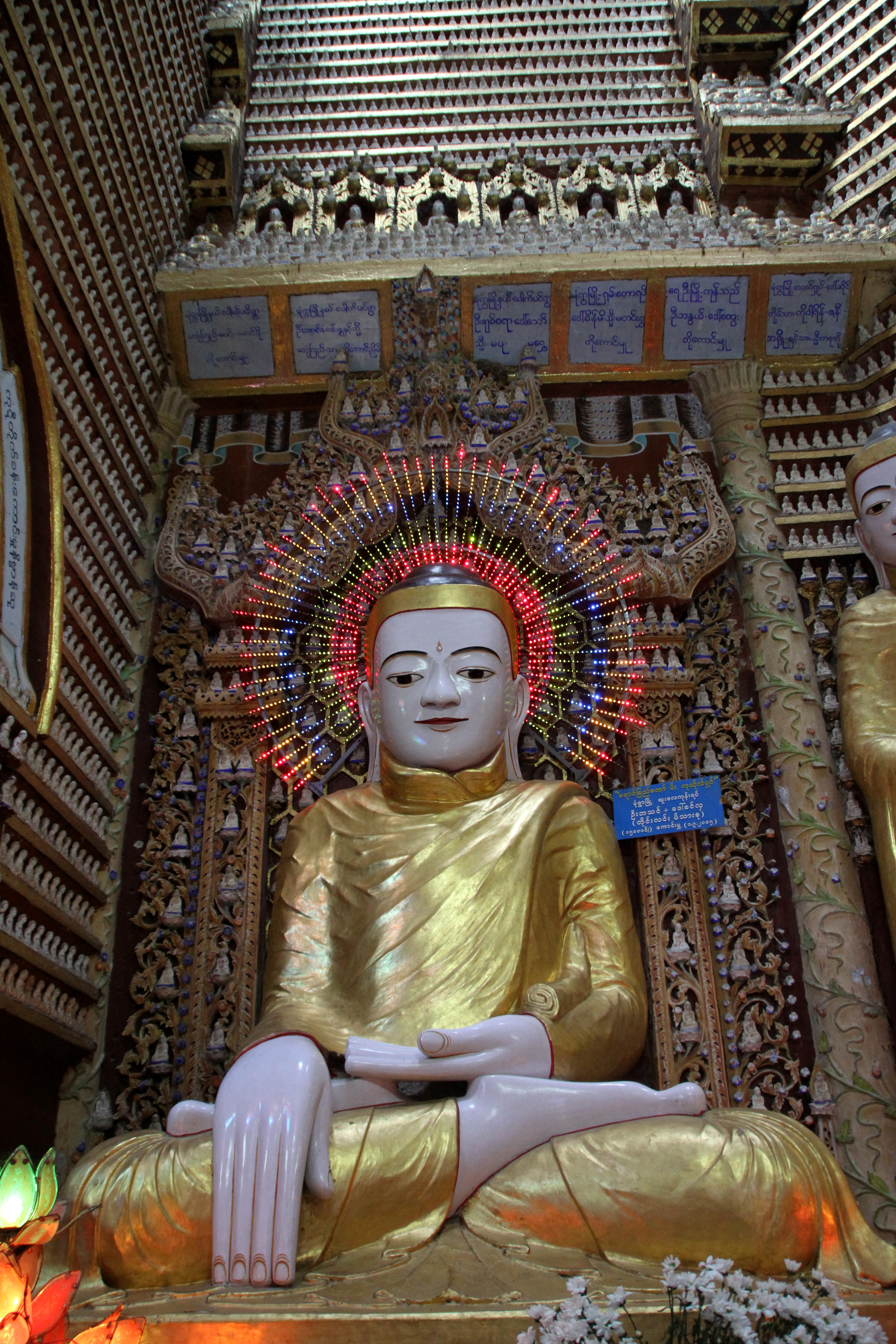

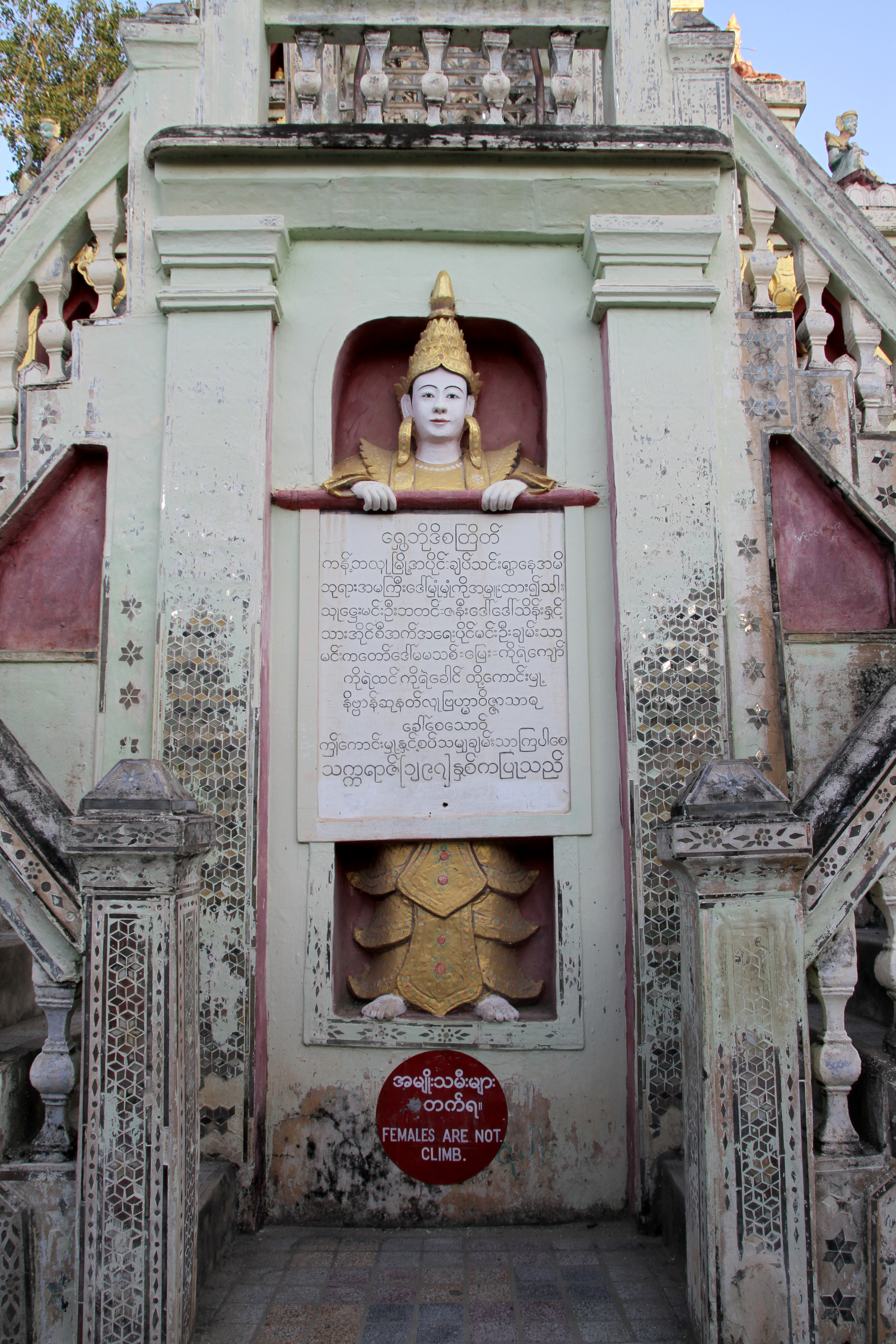

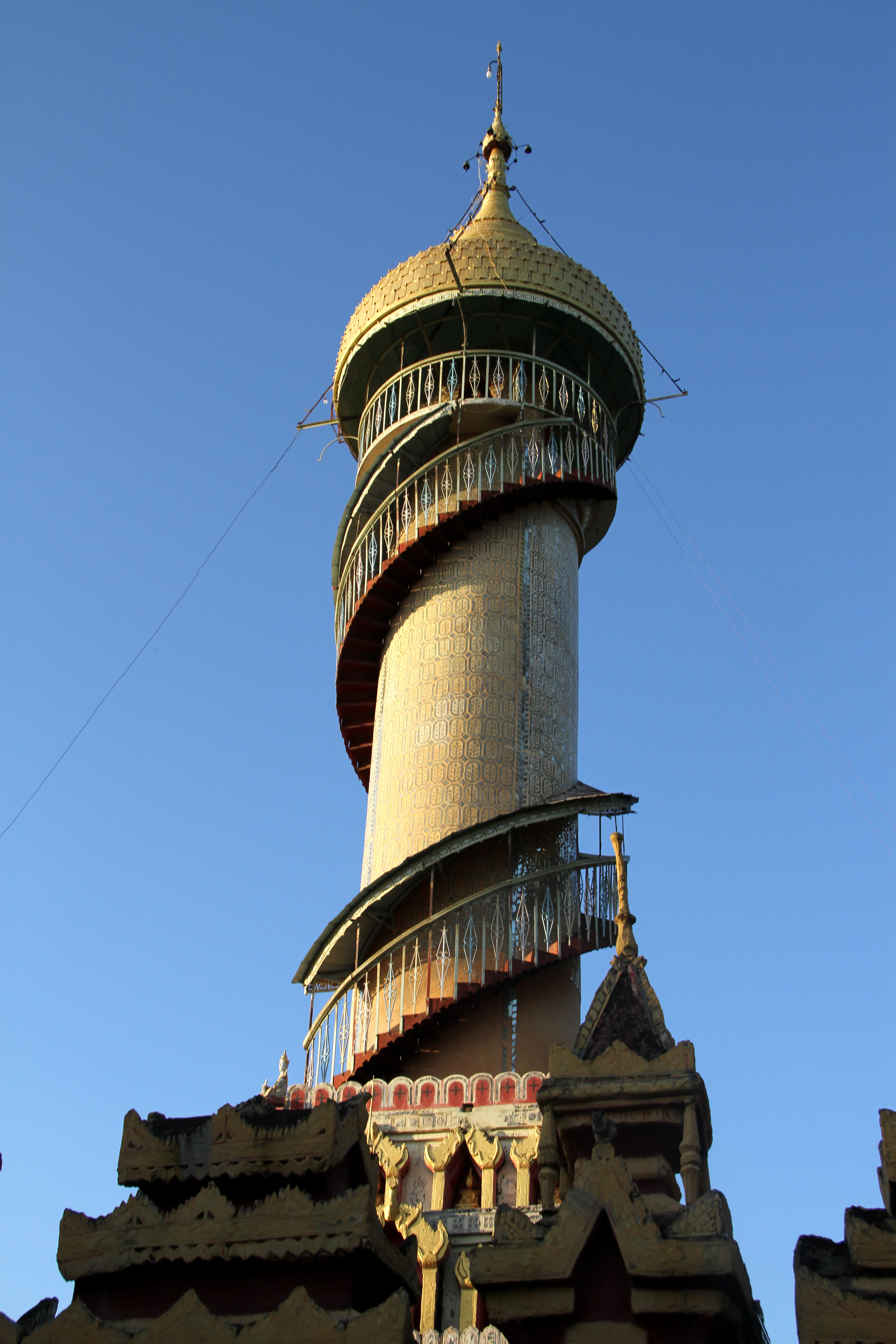
