= Lun Thi =

- လွန်းသီ
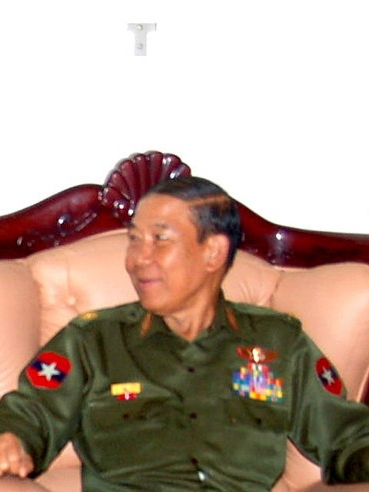
- Lun Thi in 2007

Member of the Pyithu Hluttaw
- In office 31 January 2011 – 29 January 2016
- Preceded by: None
- Succeeded by: Soe Thura Tun
- Constituency: Kungyangon Township
- Majority: 57,731 (86.59%)

Minister for Energy of Myanmar
- In office 20 December 1997 – 30 March 2011
- Preceded by: Khin Maung Thein
- Succeeded by: Than Htay

Personal details
- Born: 18 July 1940 (age 86) British Burma
- Party: Union Solidarity and Development Party
- Spouse: Khin Mar Aye
- Children: Mya Sein Aye; Zin Maung Lun
- Education: Defence Services Academy (4th intake)

Military service
- Allegiance: Myanmar
- Branch/service: Myanmar Army
- Years of service: –2010
- Rank: Brigadier-General

Lun Thi (Burmese: လွန်းသီ; born 18 July 1940) is a Burmese politician and retired Brigadier-General. He previously served as a member of the Pyithu Hluttaw, representing Yangon Region's Kungyangon Township. He also previously served as the Minister for Energy of Myanmar.
