= Thant Sin Maung =

Burmese politician

His Excellency Thant Sin Maung
- သန့်စင်မောင်

Minister for Transport and Communications
- In office 30 March 2016 – 1 February 2021
- President: Htin Kyaw; Myint Swe (acting); Win Myint
- Preceded by: Nyan Tun Aung (Transport); Zayar Aung (Communication)
- Succeeded by: Admiral Tin Aung San

Pyithu Hluttaw MP
- In office 1 February 2016 – 30 March 2016
- Succeeded by: Nyunt Aung
- Constituency: Monywa Township

Personal details
- Born: November 15, 1953 (age 72) Monywa Township, Sagaing Division, Burma (Myanmar)
- Party: National League for Democracy
- Spouse: Khin Than Aye
- Children: 3
- Education: Yangon University
- Occupation: Academic, Government Servant, Politician

Thant Sin Maung (Burmese: သန့်စင်မောင် [θa̰ɴ sɪ̀ɴ màʊɴ]; born 15 November 1953) is a Burmese politician and former Minister for Transport and Communications of Myanmar (Burma). On 22 March 2016, he was nominated as Minister for Transport and Communications in President Htin Kyaw's Cabinet. On 24 March, the Assembly of the Union confirmed his nomination.

He previously served as Pyithu Hluttaw MP for Monywa Township.

== Early life and education ==
Thant Sin Maung was born on 15 November 1953 in Monyway village, Monywa Township, Sagaing Division, Burma (now Myanmar) to Lu Lay and Ohn Kyi. He graduated from Rangoon Arts and Science University with M.Sc. in Mathematics.

== Career ==
Thant Zin Maung started working as a tutor in Pathein College and Rangoon Arts and Science University. He then moved to Myanmar Railways as an assistant manager, and worked in various positions until his retirement as a general manager.

In 2015 Myanmar general election, he was elected as a Pyithu Hluttaw MP for Monywa Township. In the aftermath of the military-led 2021 Myanmar coup d'état, the Myanmar Armed Forces asked Thant Sin Maung to vacate his ministerial residence. He was placed under house arrest.

== Personal life ==
He married Khin Than Aye, a medical doctor, and has three children, Arkar Thant Sin, Phoo Thant Sin, and Htoo Thant Sin. He also has 3 main grandchildren named Thitsar Thant Zin, Swan Htet Zarni and Khant Phone Lwin.
