= Ministry of Electric Power =

Government ministry of Myanmar

- လျှပ်စစ်စွမ်းအားဝန်ကြီးဌာန (Burmese)

Agency overview
- Formed: 15 November 1997 (1st); 2 May 2022 (2nd)
- Dissolved: March 30, 2016 (1st time)
- Superseding agency: Ministry of Electricity and Energy (Myanmar)
- Type: Ministry
- Jurisdiction: Government of Burma
- Headquarters: Naypyidaw
- Minister responsible: Nyan Tun
- Deputy Minister responsible: Aye Kyaw
- Website: www.moep.gov.mm

The Ministry of Electric Power (Burmese: လျှပ်စစ်စွမ်းအားဝန်ကြီးဌာန; abbreviated MOEP) administered Myanmar's electric power policies. Its last Union Minister was Nyan Tun, who replaced Thaung Han in August 2023.

== History ==
On 1 October 1951, Electricity Supply Board (ESB) was organized under the Ministry of Industry. On 16 March 1972, it was changed as Electric Power Corporation (EPC). On 1 April 1975, the Ministry of Industry was organized as No 1 and No 2, the EPC was composed under the Ministry of No 2 Industry. On 12 April 1985, the Ministry of No 2 Industry was changed as Ministry of Energy, so the EPC was composed under it. On 1 April 1989, the EPC was changed into Myanmar Electric Power Enterprise (MEPE).

On 15 November 1997, the Ministry of Electrical Power was started organized and there were three departments under it, Department of Electrical Power, Myanmar Electric Power Enterprise and Department of Hydropower. On 15 May 2006, the ministry was divided into No 1 and No 2. On 5 September 2012, they were composed as one Ministry as Ministry of Electrical Power (MOEP).

In the new Myanmar cabinet of U Htin Kyaw, the MOEP was composed with Ministry of Energy as Ministry of Electricity and Energy (MOEE).

After 2021 coup, the provisional government reorganized MOEE into Ministry of Electric Power (MOEP) and Ministry of Energy (MOE).

In 2026, after Min Aung Hlaing assumed the role of President of Myanmar, the Ministry of Electric Power was merged with the Ministry of Energy to reconstitute the Ministry of Electricity and Energy after it was split into the Ministry of Electric Power and Ministry of Energy in 2022.

== Ministers ==
- Thaung Han (2 May 2022 - Incumbent)

== Projects ==
Myanmar Engineering Society has identified at least 39 locations capable of geothermal power production and some of these hydrothermal reservoirs lie quite close to Yangon which is a significant underutilized resource.

Financing Geothermal projects in Myanmar use an estimated break even power cost of 5.3-8.6 U.S cents/kWh or in Myanmar Kyat 53-86K per kWh. This pegs a non-fluctuating 1$=1000K, which is a main concern for power project funding. The main drawback with depreciation pressures, in the current FX market. Between June 2012 and October 2015, the Myanmar Kyat depreciated by approximately 35%, from 850 down to 1300 against the US Dollar. Local businesses with foreign denominated loans from abroad suddenly found themselves rushing for a strategy to mitigate currency risks. Myanmar’s current lack of available currency hedging solutions presents a real challenge for Geothermal project financing.

== See also ==
- Cabinet of Burma
