= Monywa Education College =

Educational institute in Sagaing Region, Myanmar

Coordinates: 22°08′23.2″N 95°08′48.4″E

Monywa Education College (Burmese: မုံရွာပညာရေးကောလိပ်) is a college located in Monywa, Sagaing Region in northwestern Myanmar. The college has the overall capacity to train 650 teacher trainees. It employs about 100 staff trainers. Traditional subjects, such as Myanmarsar, English, Mathematics, Economics, Physics, History, and Education Theory are offered. Students are required to wear the traditional academic uniform of a white shirt and green longyi. They are expected to live, dine, and worship together on campus.
