= Parami Energy Group =

Myanmar-based energy conglomerate

Parami Energy Group of Companies
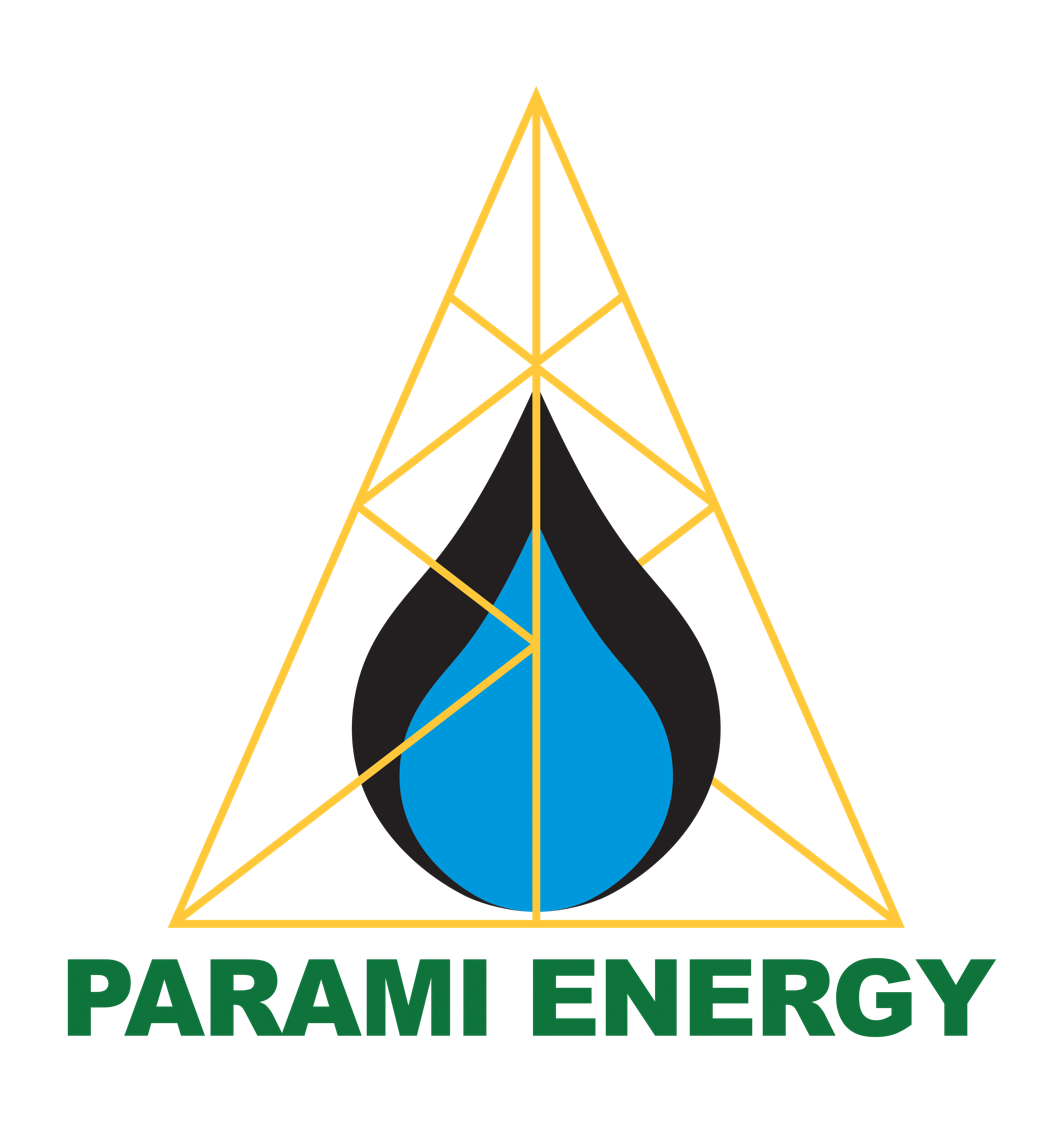
- Native name: ပါရမီ စြမ္းအင္ ကုမၸဏီ
- Company type: Privately held company
- Industry: Renewable & Clean Energy; Electric Power Generation; Oil & Gas Exploration
- Founded: 2004
- Founder: Ken Tun
- Headquarters: Yangon, Myanmar
- Key people: Ken Tun
- Website: www.parami.com

Parami Energy Group of Companies is a Myanmar-based energy conglomerate active in solar powered electricity generation, Liquefied petroleum gas (LPG) import and distribution, and oil & gas exploration and development.

== History ==
Parami Energy Group of Companies was founded in 2004 by Ken Tun as an engineering service provider. In 2009, Parami partnered India's Punj Lloyd Group in the construction of the landmark 40" x 205 km pipeline connecting the offshore Shwe natural gas field to China, a project that commissioned for operation in July 2013.

In 2012, Parami secured a license to explore and develop Myanmar’s PSC-I onshore oil and gas block with India’s Jubilant Energy. In 2014, it was awarded a license to explore and develop two offshore oil and gas blocks, AD-3 and A5, as minority shareholder with UK-based Ophir Energy and US-based Chevron.

In March 2017, Parami was selected by the Union Ministry of Agriculture, Livestock and Irrigation as the private sector developer and operator of solar-powered electrification projects in rural Magway and Mandalay regions as part of the Myanmar government's National Electrification Program supported by the World Bank.

In September 2017, Parami was awarded a contract by the Union Ministry of Electricity and Energy to operate a state-owned LPG import facility.

== Operations ==
The company currently operates two projects. Under its Parami Gas brand, it markets and distributes LPG to commercial and residential customers across Myanmar. Secondly, it operates two solar power projects on Yesagyo Island and in Gyaint Gyi township of Magway and Mandalay regions respectively.
