= Solar power in Myanmar =

Solar power in Myanmar has the potential to generate 51,973.8 TWh/year, with an average of over 5 sun hours per day. Even though hydropower is responsible for most electricity production in Myanmar, the country has rich technical solar power potential that is the highest in the Greater Mekong Subregion; however, in terms of installed capacity Myanmar lags largely behind Thailand and Vietnam. In 2023, solar power contributed 1.65% of the country's total energy mix.

In rural areas, photovoltaics are used for charging batteries and pumping water. 70% of the Myanmar population of live in rural areas.

Myanmar's opened its first solar power plant in Minbu, Magway Division, in November 2018. It can produce as much as 170MW of electricity.

In 2019, the government announced plans to build two solar energy plants—in Myingyan and Wundwin in Mandalay Division—each to have a generation capacity of 150 MW.

To accelerate the development of solar energy in the country, Myanmar needs to improve renewable energy governance, build an effective regulatory framework for renewable energy and simplify the business environment for investors. As of 2021, Myanmar is not yet a member of the International Renewable Energy Agency (IRENA), an international organization that facilitates cooperation and promotes the adoption of renewable energy; joining IRENA could help Myanmar receive external support and attract more investment in renewables.

== Gallery ==
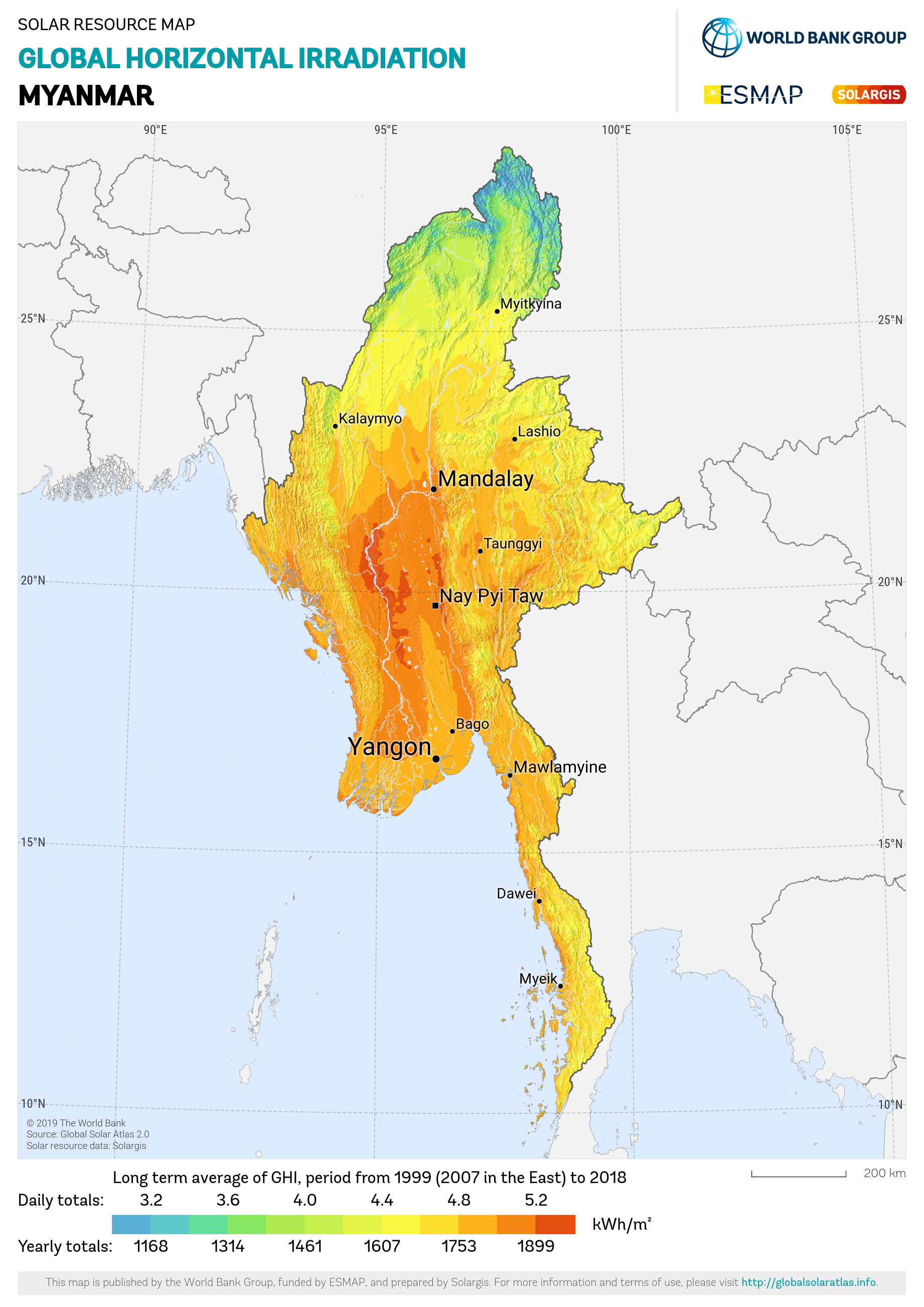
Solar potential map of Myanmar

Planned solar power projects in 2020

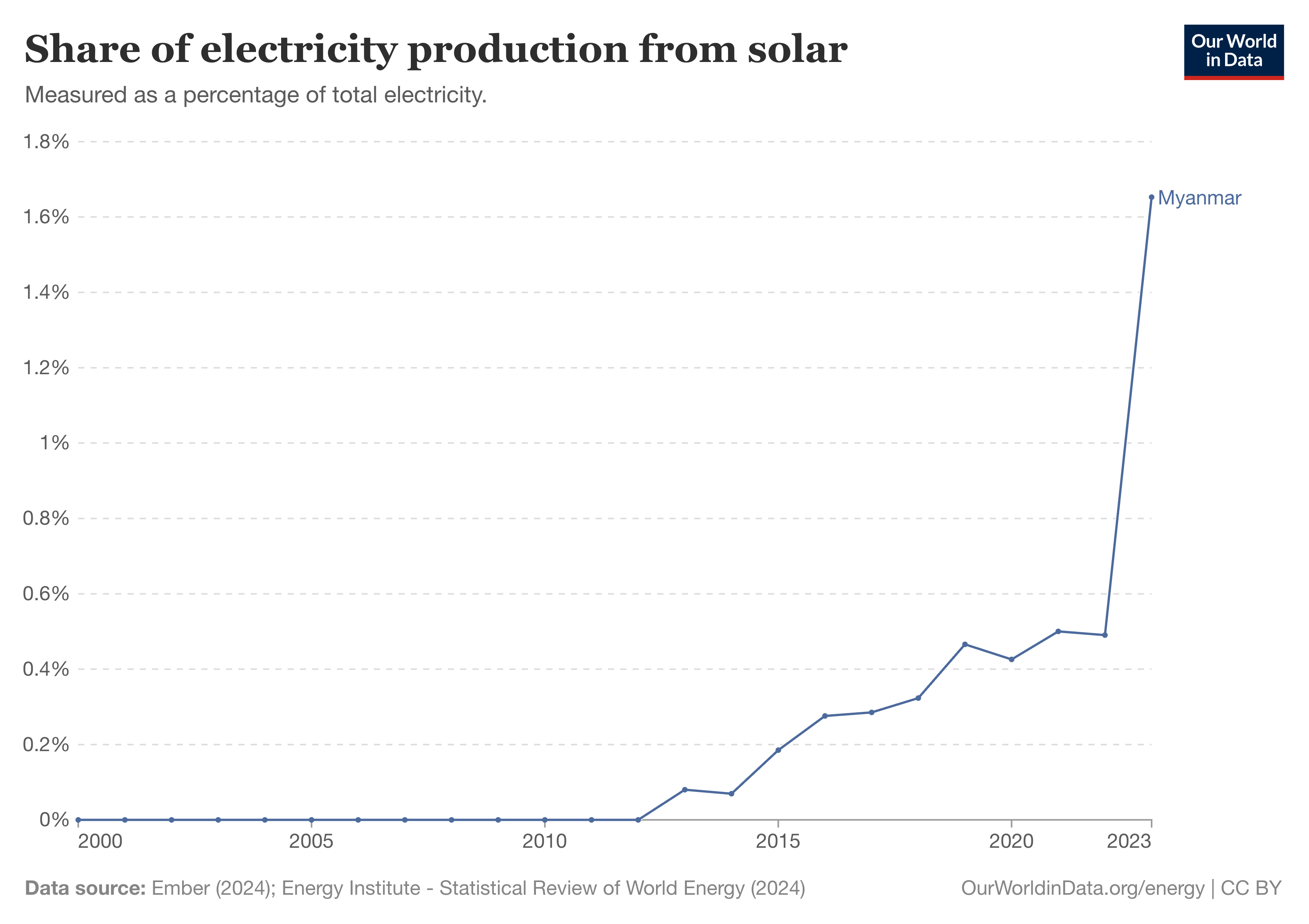
Share of solar in total national electricity production

== See also ==
- Energy in Myanmar
