= Aung Than Oo =

Burmese politician (born 1963)

Aung Than Oo is a Burmese politician who was previously Economy Minister for Yangon Region.

In June 2022 Aung Than Oo was dismissed by Myanmar's State Administration Council (SAC) per Order No. 41/2022, following Constitutional Article 419.

Before his ministerial tenure Aung Than Oo was the Vice-Chairman of the Myanmar Rice Federation and a Union Solidarity and Development Party member. He won the 2010 general election but lost to the NLD in 2015 and 2020 elections.
