= Khat Thi =

Burmese poet (1976–2021)

- ခက်သီ
- Born: Zaw Tun; 1976; Pale, Myanmar
- Died: 8 March 2021 (aged 44–45); Shwebo, Sagaing Region
- Resting place: Pale, Sagaing Region
- Occupation: The Martyr of Myanmar's Democracy
- Spouse: Chaw Su

Khat Thi (also spelt Khet Thi, Burmese: ခက်သီ; born Zaw Tun, 1976 — 8 March 2021), was a Burmese revolutionary poet who was killed during the 2021 Myanmar protests in Myanmar. His poems were widely used for Anti-junta resistance movement in Myanmar. Khet Thi was at least the third poet to die during protests since the coup (February 1). He became an icon of the anti-coup protest movement after he was dead. He is considered one of the most prominent heroes of Burma's pro-democracy movement and is remembered as a hero of Myanmar's Democracy.

He was named one of the "Outstanding People's Stars of 2021" by The Irrawaddy.

== Career ==
From 2004 to 2012, Khat Thi worked as a junior engineer (S.A.E.) on the Development Affairs Committee in Shwebo and Monywa Townships. He had been an engineer before quitting his job in 2012 to focus on his poetry and to support himself by making and selling ice cream and cakes.

His wife Chaw Su, is an officer for the Telecommunications Department who was active in the Civil Disobedience Movement (CDM) of work stoppages in opposition to military rule.

== Political activities ==
Khat Thi was active in the 1996 student uprising and the 2007 Saffron Revolution. Following the 2021 Myanmar coup d'état, he led anti-military protests in Pale. He wrote a post on Facebook two weeks after the coup;

"I don't want to be a hero, I don't want to be a martyr, I don't want to be a weakling, I don't want to be a fool". "I don't want to support injustice. If I have only a minute to live, I want my conscience to be clean for that minute."

— Khat Thi

His poem "Shin Than Chin Shindan" (ရှင်သန်ခြင်း ရှင်းတမ်း) was widely renowned among protesters. One of his most well known lines was, "They shoot in the head, but they don't know the revolution is in the heart." It was a poem that reminded him. Khat Thi was taken into custody on the night (at around 9PM) of May 8 for questioning at a detention center in the town of Shwebo in central Myanmar that has been the scene of heavy protests against military rule. Although his wife Chaw Su was detained at the Shwebo police station.

He was taken to an undisclosed location and died during his interrogation by the military. His body returned to his family hours later with his internal organs removed and had bruising on the chest, along the ribs, and on his wrists. But, authorities said that he had died of a heart attack. The junta forces did not disclose any information regarding Khet Thi's arrest or his cause of death.

His family has brought his body to home on the evening of May 10. His funeral on 10 May 2021 was attended by several thousands of protesters.

About 2,000 people protested in the Black Movementto mark the one-month anniversary of the death of Khat Thi. The protesters then recited poems in memory of Khat Thi and prayed for the fallen martyrs.

== Revolutionary poem ==
"Shin Than Chin Shindan" (Survival Explanations) composed by Khat Thi is used for anti-coup resistance in Myanmar.

Burmese script

သူတို့က ခေါင်းကိုပစ်တယ် တော်လှန်ရေးက နှလုံးသားမှာရှိတာ မသိကြဘူး
ငါ သေနတ် မပစ်တတ်ဘူး
ငါ သေနတ်မပစ်တတ်ဘူး
ငါ့လက်က ဂစ်တာတီးခဲ့တာ
ငါ သေနတ်မပစ်တတ်ဘူး
ငါ့လက်က ကဗျာပဲရေးတတ်တာ
ငါ သေနတ်မပစ်တတ်ဘူး
ငါ မွေးနေ့ကိတ်ပဲ အလှဆင်တတ်တာ
အခု ငါ့လူတွေ သေနတ်ပစ်ခံရတယ်
ငါကတော့ ကဗျာနဲ့ပဲ ပြန်ပစ်နိုင်ခဲ့တယ်
အဲ့ဒါဟာ မမျှတဘူးလို့ ခံစားနေရတယ်
လိပ်ပြာမလုံဘူးလို့ တွေးရိပ်ထင်နေတယ်
ငါ သေနတ်ပစ်မယ်
ငါ သေနတ်ပစ်မယ်
ပါးစပ်နဲ့မရတာ သေချာတဲ့အခါ
သေနတ်ကို သေသေချာချာ ရွေးချယ်ရတော့မယ်
ငါ သေနတ်ပစ်မယ်

English translation

They aim at head, little do they know; revolution lies in heart.
I can't shoot a gun
I can't shoot a gun
My hands played the guitar
I can't shoot a gun
My hand only writes poetry
I can't shoot a gun
I only decorate, birthday cakes
Now that my people are shot at
With poetry alone, could I shoot back
I feel that is not fair
I reflect, a guilty conscience
I will shoot
I will shoot
When it's sure, words can't render
Must I carefully choose a gun
I will fire.
