= Ministry of Energy (Myanmar) =

Government ministry of Myanmar

- စွမ်းအင် ဝန်ကြီးဌာန
- Seal of the Ministry of Energy

Agency overview
- Formed: 12 April 1985 (1st); 2 May 2022 (2nd)
- Dissolved: March 30, 2016 (1st time)
- Superseding agency: Ministry of Electricity and Energy
- Jurisdiction: Government of Myanmar
- Headquarters: Building No (6); Naypyidaw
- Minister responsible: Myo Myint Oo
- Deputy Minister responsible: Thant Zin
- Child agencies: Energy Planning Department; Myanma Oil and Gas Enterprise (MOGE); Myanma Petrochemical Enterprise (MPE); Myanma Petroleum Products Enterprise (MPPE)
- Website: www.energy.gov.mm

The Ministry of Energy (Burmese: စွမ်းအင် ဝန်ကြီးဌာန, 'MOE') was a ministry in the Burmese government that was responsible for the country's energy sector, in particular exploration of crude oil and natural gas and manufacture and distribution of petrochemicals and petroleum products.

== History ==
From 1948 to 1985, organizations for energy sector were organized under Ministry of Mines and Ministry of Industry (2). Ministry of Energy was formed on 1985 April (12) by Council of State. In 2016, newly elected president Htin Kyaw combined Ministry of Electric Power and Ministry of Energy as Ministry of Electricity and Energy.

In 2022 May, SAC reconstituted the ministry as Ministry of Electric Power and Ministry of Energy.

== Ministers ==
=== Ministers of MOE (2011 - 2016) ===
- Than Htay (30 March 2011 - 25 July 2013)
- Zayar Aung (14 August 2015 - 30 March 2016)

=== Ministers of MOEE (2016 - 2022) ===
- Aung San Suu Kyi (30 March 2016 - 6 April 2016)
- Pe Zin Tun (7 April 2016 - 1 August 2017)
- Win Khaing (2 August 2017 - 1 February 2021)
- Aung Than Oo (8 February 2021 - 2 May 2022)

=== Ministers of MOE ===
- Thaung Han (2 May 2022 - 5 August 2022)
- Myo Myint Oo (5 August 2022 - Incumbent)

=== Deputy Ministers ===
- Soe Aung (2011 - ??)
- Htin Aung (12 August 2012 - 25 July 2013)
- Myint Zaw (7 August 2013 - ??)
- Dr Tun Naing (12 September 2016 - 1 February 2021)
- Khin Maung Win (2018 - 1 February 2021)
- Thant Zin (11 March 2021 - Incumbent)

== Projects ==
Myanmar Engineering Society has identified at least 39 locations capable of geothermal power production and some of these hydrothermal reservoirs lie quite close to Yangon which is a significant underutilized resource for electrical generation to accelerate rural & economic development.
