= KT Group =

- Founded: 1956; 69 years ago
- Headquarters: Myanmar (Burma)
- Key people: Jonathan Myo Kyaw Thaung, CEO; Deborah Kyaw Thaung, Executive Director; Harriet Kyaw Thaung, Director

KT Group is a family-owned business enterprise in Myanmar, with business interests in aviation, real estate, container ports, and oil and gas. KT Group is led by Jonathan Kyaw Thaung, its CEO. The Kyaw Thaung family also operates a network of 28 subsidiaries and associated businesses, including Ky Tha Group. KT Group also operates a charitable arm, KT Care, founded in 2008.

KT Group has courted significant scrutiny for its close ties to the Burmese military. The group has partnerships with military-linked businessmen including Aung Pyae Sone, the son of Min Aung Hlaing, the country's military ruler.

In 2016, KT Group leased the Yangon's TMT Ports terminal (formerly Bo Aung Kyaw terminal) from the military-owned Myanma Economic Holdings Limited under a 50-year build-operate-transfer agreement worth US$3 million per year. In February 2020, Burma Campaign UK successfully pressured British companies using the port to terminate their relationship with KT Group due to military ties.

In August 2021, a United Nations fact-finding mission concluded that KT Group warranted criminal investigation for donating US$40,000 to the military to assist it with the Rohingya clearance operations in Rakhine State. In November 2021, KT Group signalled an interest in acquiring Telenor Myanmar. In December 2021, a New York Times investigation found that KT Group had been used by the Burmese military to circumvent sanctions to purchase military equipment and hardware, including the import of aircraft for the Burmese military's fleet, and a coastal radar technology system made by Thales, which is partially owned by the French government.
