= Ministry of Electricity and Energy (Myanmar) =

Government ministry in Myanmar

Agency overview
- Formed: 10 April 2026; 7 months ago
- Preceding agencies: Ministry of Electrical Power; Ministry of Energy
- Dissolved: 2 May 2022; 4 years ago
- Jurisdiction: Government of Myanmar
- Headquarters: Office No (27), Office No (8) Naypyidaw
- Minister responsible: Ko Ko Lwin
- Agency executive: Union Minister
- Website: www.moee.gov.mm

Ministry of Electricity and Energy (Burmese: လျှပ်စစ်နှင့်စွမ်းအင်ဝန်ကြီးဌာန; abbreviated as MOEE), also known as the Ministry of Electric Power and Energy, is the ministry of Myanmar composed by two ministries, Electrical Power (MoEP) and Energy (MoE). It was split into the MoEP and MoE in May 2022 by SAC. After Min Aung Hlaing became President of Myanmar, he merged the MoEP and the MoE back into the Ministry of Electricity and Energy.

== History ==
On March 30th, 2016, newly elected president Htin Kyaw combined Ministry of Electric Power and Ministry of Energy as Ministry of Electricity and Energy.

In 2022 May, SAC split the ministry into the Ministry of Electric Power and Ministry of Energy.

Then, the two ministries were merged back into the Ministry of Electricity and Energy after Min Aung Hlaing took office as President of Myanmar.

== Ministers ==
- Aung San Suu Kyi (March 2016- April 2016)
- Pe Zin Tun (April 2016- August 2017)
- Win Khine (August 2017- February 2021)
- Aung Than Oo (February 2021- 2 May 2022
- Taung Han ( 2022-2023 )
- Nyan Tun (2023 - 2026 April )
- Ko Ko Lwin ( 2026 April - present )

== Deputy Ministers ==
- Thant Zin ( 2021 February - 2023 )
- Aye Kyaw ( 2023 - present )

== Permanent Secretary ==
Htet Hlyan Phyo ( 2026 April - present)

== Departments ==
- Union Minister Office
- Oil and Gas Planning Department
- Myanmar Oil and Gas Enterprise
- Myanmar Petrochemical Enterprise
- Myanmar Petroleum Products Enterprise
- Department of Electric Power Planning
- Department of Hydropower Implementation
- Department of Power Transmission and System Control
- Electricity Supply Enterprise
- Electric Power Generation Enterprise
- Yangon Electricity Supply Corporation
- Mandalay Electricity Supply Corporation
