= Monywa Township =

- Township
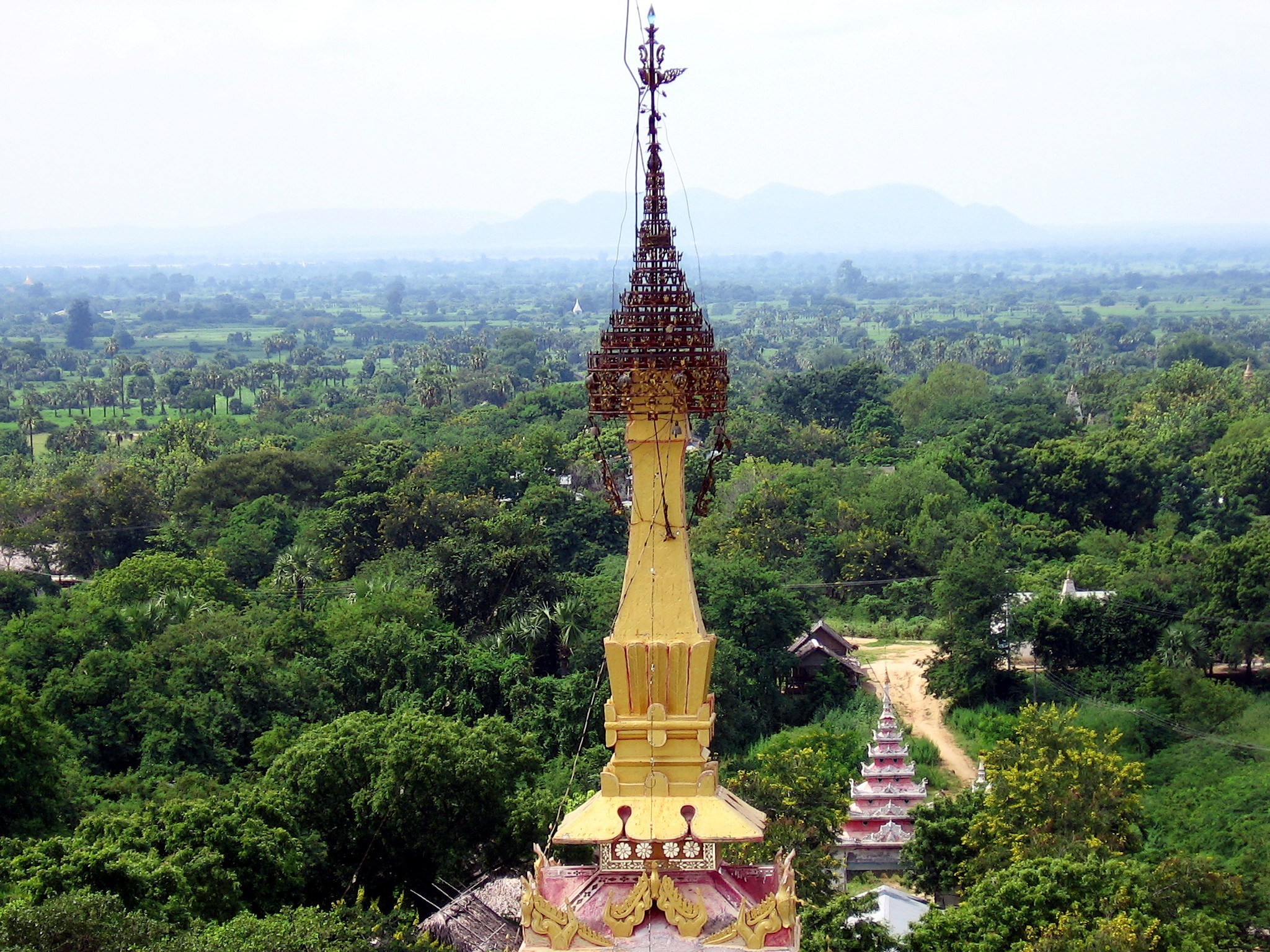

- Location in Myanmar
- Coordinates: 22°6′N 95°8′E
- Country: Myanmar
- Region: Sagaing Region
- District: Monywa District
- Capital: Monywa
- Time zone: UTC+6.30 (MST)

Monywa is a township in Monywa District in the Sagaing Region of Myanmar (Burma). The township seat is Monywa.
