= Ministry of Communications and Information Technology (Myanmar) =

Burmese government agency

- ဆက်သွယ်ရေးနှင့် သတင်းအချက်အလက် နည်းပညာဝန်ကြီးဌာန

Agency overview
- Preceding agency: Ministry of Communications, Posts and Telegraphs
- Dissolved: 30 March 2016
- Superseding agency: Ministry of Transport and Communications (Myanmar)
- Type: Ministry
- Jurisdiction: Government of Myanmar
- Headquarters: Naypyidaw
- Child agency: Myanma Posts and Telecommunications
- Website: www.mcit.gov.mm

The Ministry of Communications and Information Technology (Burmese: ဆက်သွယ်ရေးနှင့် သတင်းအချက်အလက် နည်းပညာဝန်ကြီးဌာန; abbreviated MCIT) was the government ministry of Myanmar. The ministry administered communications, postal services, and information technology.

In November 2012, the name was changed from the Ministry of Communications, Posts and Telegraphs (MCPT) to the MCIT with the cabinet reshuffle under Thein Sein's administration.

After that, with the reorganization of ministries in March 2016, the Ministry of Communications and Information Technology was merged with the Ministry of Transport and the Ministry of Rail Transportation to become the Ministry of Transport and Communications (MOTC).

== See also ==
- Economy of Myanmar
- Cabinet of Myanmar
