= Hpakant jade mine disaster =

Hpakant jade mine disaster may refer to:

- 2015 Hpakant jade mine disaster
- April 2019 Hpakant jade mine collapse
- July 2019 Hpakant jade mine collapse
- 2020 Hpakant jade mine disaster
- 2021 Hpakant jade mine disaster
- 2023 Hpakant jade mine disaster
