= 2021 Hpakant jade mine disaster =

Landslide in Myanmar

Coordinates: 25°36′N 96°18′E

- Hpakant jade mine (Myanmar)
- Date: 22 December 2021
- Time: 04:00 MST
- Location: Hpakant, Kachin State, Myanmar
- Deaths: 3–20
- Injuries: 25
- Missing: 70–100

On 22 December 2021, a landslide at a jade mine in the Hpakant township in Kachin State, Myanmar, killed at least three people, and left between 70 and 100 missing.

== Background ==
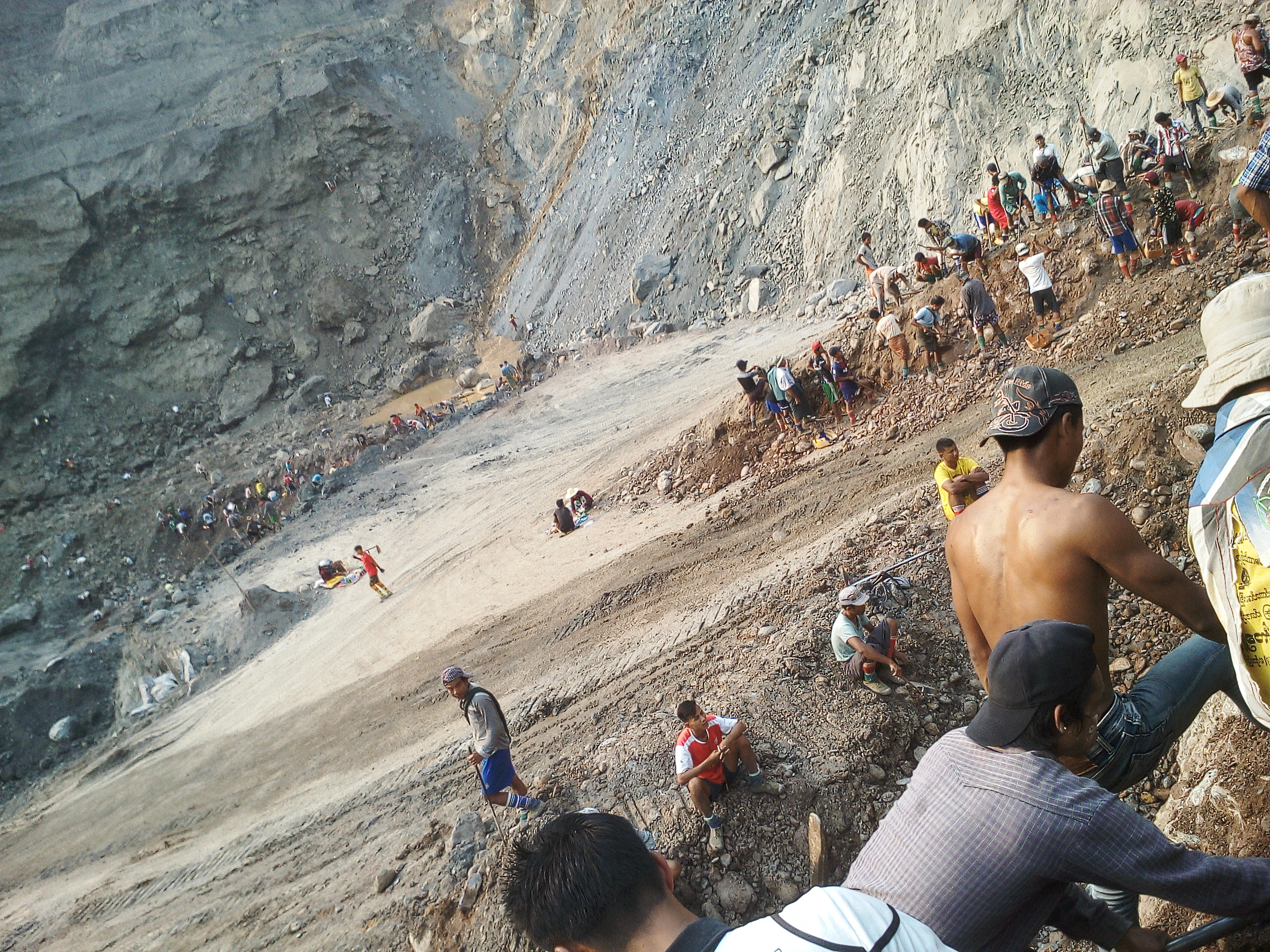
Workers at a jade mine in Kachin in 2018

Myanmar supplies 90% of all jade on the planet, in a trade worth US$790 million according to Myanmar's official statistics, though independent estimates put it at US$30–31 billion worth per year. According to Global Witness, the industry was worth US$31 billion. While Reuters, al Jazeera and Deutsche Welle do not say any number nor year. The industry is known for frequent accidents at its mining sites. Hpakant is home to the largest jade mine in the world.

Dozens of miners have been killed in recent years as a result of smaller accidents, with "jade pickers" who scavenge tailings from larger operators being at greater risk. These freelance miners live at the base of huge mounds of rubble that has been excavated by heavy machinery. The pickers are usually migrants from other regions of Myanmar and are unregistered, which makes identification of the missing people difficult. Hundreds of miners scavenge through tailings dumped by trucks at the site. The tailings are piled high forming steep and high slopes, in a moonscape of no vegetation, which is likely to collapse.

In 2015, a landslide killed at least 116 people in the mine. After the incident and the formation of Htin Kyaw's Cabinet, led by Htin Kyaw and Aung San Suu Kyi in 2016, the cabinet promised to reform the jade industry and reduce the accidents. Activists claim, however, that little has been done in practice since the Cabinet took power that same year. In 2019, fifty workers were buried in a mine collapse, resulting in the deaths of four miners and two rescue workers. According to the BBC at least 100 people died in that year.

In 2020, at least 175 people were killed in another landslide in the same mine. The 2020 disaster was the worst mining-related event in the country. The landslide was triggered by mining waste collapsing into the lake. More recently, a week before the 2021 landslide, another accident at a jade mine in the same area left ten miners missing.

Jade mining in Myanmar is prohibited till March 2022, but these imposed laws are broken by locals who are struggling amidst low employment and poverty. In 2018, the nation passed a new law to reform the corrupted industry. However, the coup d'état in February 2021 prevented any proper execution of the law.

== Landslide ==
The landslide occurred at just before daybreak at 04:00 local time on Wednesday 22 December 2021. It was located at an open mine near the village of Thayar Gone. The likely cause of the landslide was an overflow of mining waste dumped by trucks into the open-pit mine. Locals said that water had seeped into the soil along the slopes of the mine, causing it to destabilize and collapse. The landslide was an estimated 100 feet high by 150 feet wide and collapsed into a lake at the bottom of the mine. It triggered waves that swept away miners. The landslide also took down with it small shops on the waste mount.

== Casualties ==
At least one person was confirmed dead; according to The Irrawaddy on the day of the landslide, the fatality was a man aged 40. By 23 December, the death toll was revised to at least three, with the recovery of two bodies. In a statement by the Kachin News Group however, 20 miners are said to have been killed. A Red Cross member in Kachin said that as much as 100 people searching for jade are unaccounted. Agence France-Presse confirmed the death of a worker and 25 others were hospitalized for injuries. In a news report, the BBC believes majority of the victims were illegal miners. A local official of Kachin said that the missing also included all of the water treatment workers at the mine.

== Aftermath ==
Rescue workers arrived at the scene of the landslide at 07:00 local time. An image posted on social media showed people standing by the shore of the lake while rescuers search the water by boat. At least 200 rescuers went into the lake by boats to search for bodies, according to an official involved in the operation. No bodies were recovered even until 11:00 local time. An official said that the recovery of bodies could take four or five days, and possibly a week. Nearby trading shops were also affected by the landslide. Personals from the military were not present at the site of the disaster.

On 23 December, two more bodies were recovered, bringing the death toll to three. The Kachin Network Development Foundation stated that as much as 80 people have not been accounted while Myanmar Now placed that number at 100. Rescue workers said that chances of finding any survivors have diminished as no survivors have been found.
