= 2020 Hpakant jade mine disaster =

Landslide in Myanmar

- Hpakant jade mine (Myanmar)
- Date: 2 July 2020
- Location: Hpakant, Kachin State, Myanmar; 25°36′46″N 98°18′41″E
- Deaths: 175–200

On 2 July 2020, a major landslide at the Wai Khar jade mining site in the Hpakant area of Kachin State, Myanmar, killed between 175 and 200 miners in the country's deadliest-ever mining incident. At 06:30 local time (MMT) heavy rains triggered the collapse of a heap of mining waste, which came tumbling down into a lake. This generated a 6 metres (20 ft) wave of mud and water that buried those working at the Wai Khar mine. The miners killed or injured by the landslide were independent "jade pickers", who scavenge tailings from larger operators and who live in ramshackle quarters at the base of large mounds of rubble.

Myanmar's jade industry supplies 70% to 90% of the world jade supply. The industry had become known for its fatal accidents in the preceding years, with the previous deadliest accident in 2015 killing 116 people. While the government responded with promises of reforms in the jade mining industry, activists claim that little has been done in practice since then.

== Background ==
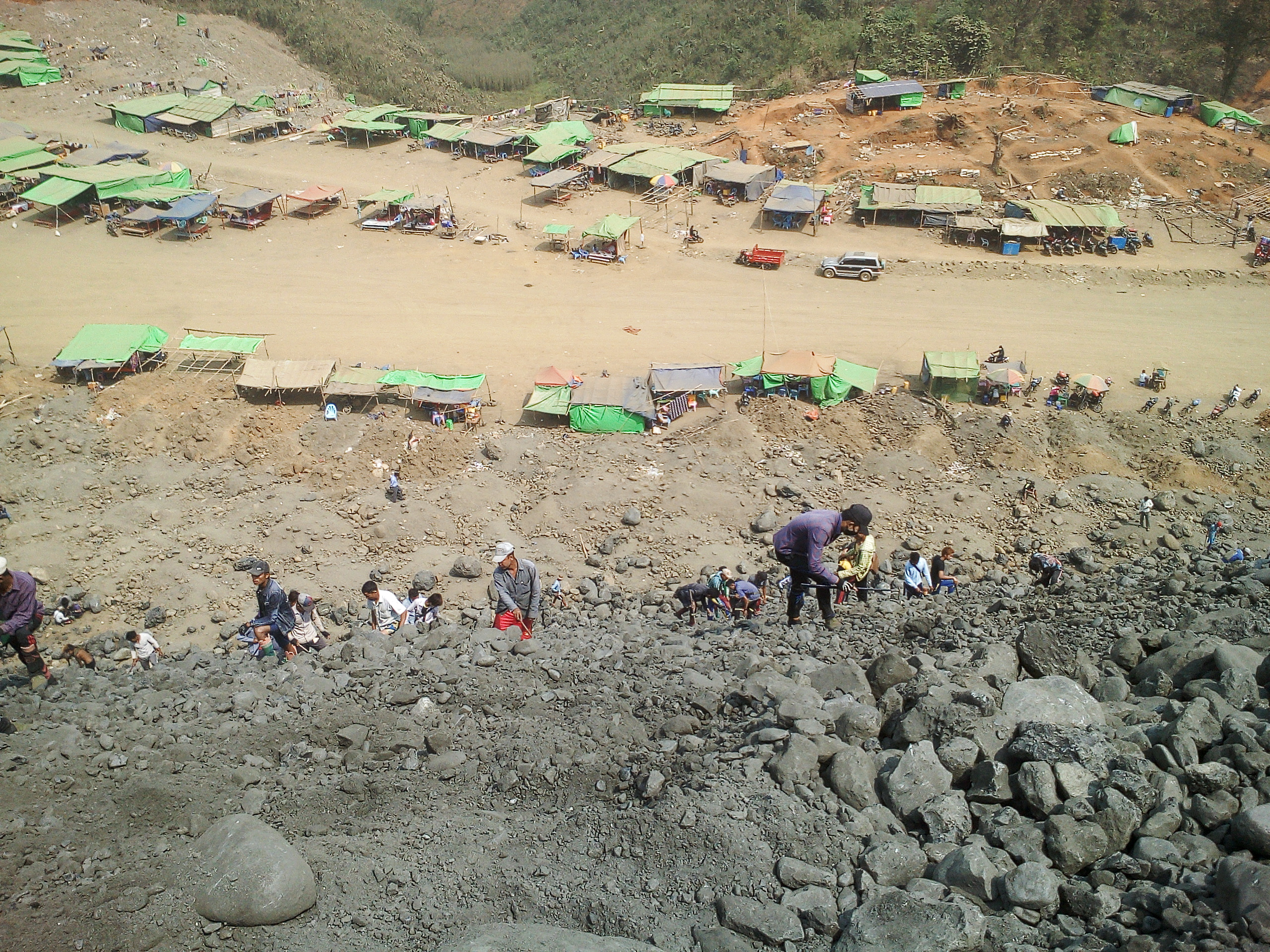
Looking down a rubble slope at a jade mine in Kachin State

Myanmar is the largest supplier of jade, providing between 70% and 90% of the world's supply. While Myanmar's official statistics for 2016–2017 put the jade trade value at US$750 million, independent estimates that include illegal mining put it at US$15–31 billion per year. (Note: BBC News in July 2021 does not mention a year, while in August 2020 BBC News cites a 2019 Natural Resource Governance Institute with a 15 billion dollar estimate. Various other sources, including CNN and Agence France-Presse, give "US$31 billion in 2014", while Reuters, Al Jazeera, and Deutsche Welle do not state any amount nor year.) The industry is known for frequent accidents at its mining sites. The largest jade mine in the world is at Hpakant in Kachin state.

Alongside the larger mining companies, independent "jade pickers" or freelance miners scavenge tailings from the larger operators. These freelance miners live in ramshackle quarters at the base of large mounds of rubble excavated by heavy machinery. Mining is performed at the Wai Khar jade mine site by hundreds of people who scavenge through tailings dumped by trucks at the site. The tailings form large slopes, described by BBC News as "an area denuded of trees and resembling a moonscape", which is susceptible to collapse. An estimated 400,000 people work as freelance miners in northern Myanmar, and as of 2018 Myanmar was ranked first among all countries in landslide fatalities.

Between 2015 and 2020, at least ten tailing dam and slope failures were reported in the Hpakant mines. Freelance miners are particularly at risk, as they work along the tailing heaps, scores have died in recent years. In 2015, a landslide killed at least 116 people in the mine. In 2019, fifty workers were buried in a mine collapse, resulting in the deaths of two rescue workers and four miners. According to the BBC at least 100 people died at Myanmar's jade mines in that year.

Jade mining in the region has raised environmental concerns. Mining companies often exceed government regulations on the height of piles of tailings that reach heights of hundreds of feet. In addition, large open mining pits are left behind by companies whose permit runs out. These pits fill with rainwater lakes that push against the tailing heaps triggering landslides. Mining debris has also disrupted the flow of natural streams in the region, causing flooding. After the 2015 landslide and the formation of Htin Kyaw's Cabinet, led by Htin Kyaw and Aung San Suu Kyi in 2016, the cabinet promised to reform the jade industry and reduce the accidents. Despite the enactment of a licensing moratorium in 2016 pursuant to companies completing an environmental impact assessment and submitting environmental management plans, mining has continued illegally.

== Landslide ==
External videos
- Landslide Kills At Least 162 in Myanmar's Jade Mining Hub (Bloomberg QuickTake News)

The day before the landslide, authorities issued a warning against mining in the area due to heavy rainfall. This warning was ignored by many miners. The Myanmar fire service said that at the time of the incident, the open-pit mine, which was owned by a local business conglomerate, was inactive. According to news reports, the workers at the Wai Khar site were freelancing scavengers who were scouring the tailings of the mine.

At 06:30 local time (MMT) (UTC+06:30), heavy rains triggered the collapse of a heap of mining waste which came tumbling down into a lake. This then generated a wave of mud and water which buried those working at the site. The wave was described by witnesses as being "20 feet high" (6 m). The collapse and the subsequent wave of mud and water was captured on video, as were the frantic attempts of escape by miners. A witness stated that the tailings pile showed signs of instability, but collapsed too quickly for workers to leave the area. The witness was quoted by Reuters as saying that "Within a minute, all the people at the bottom [of the hill] just disappeared. I feel empty in my heart ... There were people stuck in the mud shouting for help but no-one could help them".

== Death toll ==
The death toll is estimated to have been between 175 and 200 people. As of 4 July 2020, 174 bodies were recovered, and more than 100 people were reported missing. The Myanmar fire service reported that 54 injured people were evacuated to hospitals. Rescue efforts were hampered by the heavy rains.

Photographs from the area showed lines of recovered bodies placed on a hill. Dozens of recovered unidentified bodies were buried in a mass grave dug out by a mechanical digger near the landslide. While the Myanmar jade industry is known for fatalities and accidents, the 2020 disaster was the deadliest such incident to date. The freelance miners at the site are often migrants from other regions of Myanmar and are unregistered, which complicated identification of the missing people.

== Causes ==
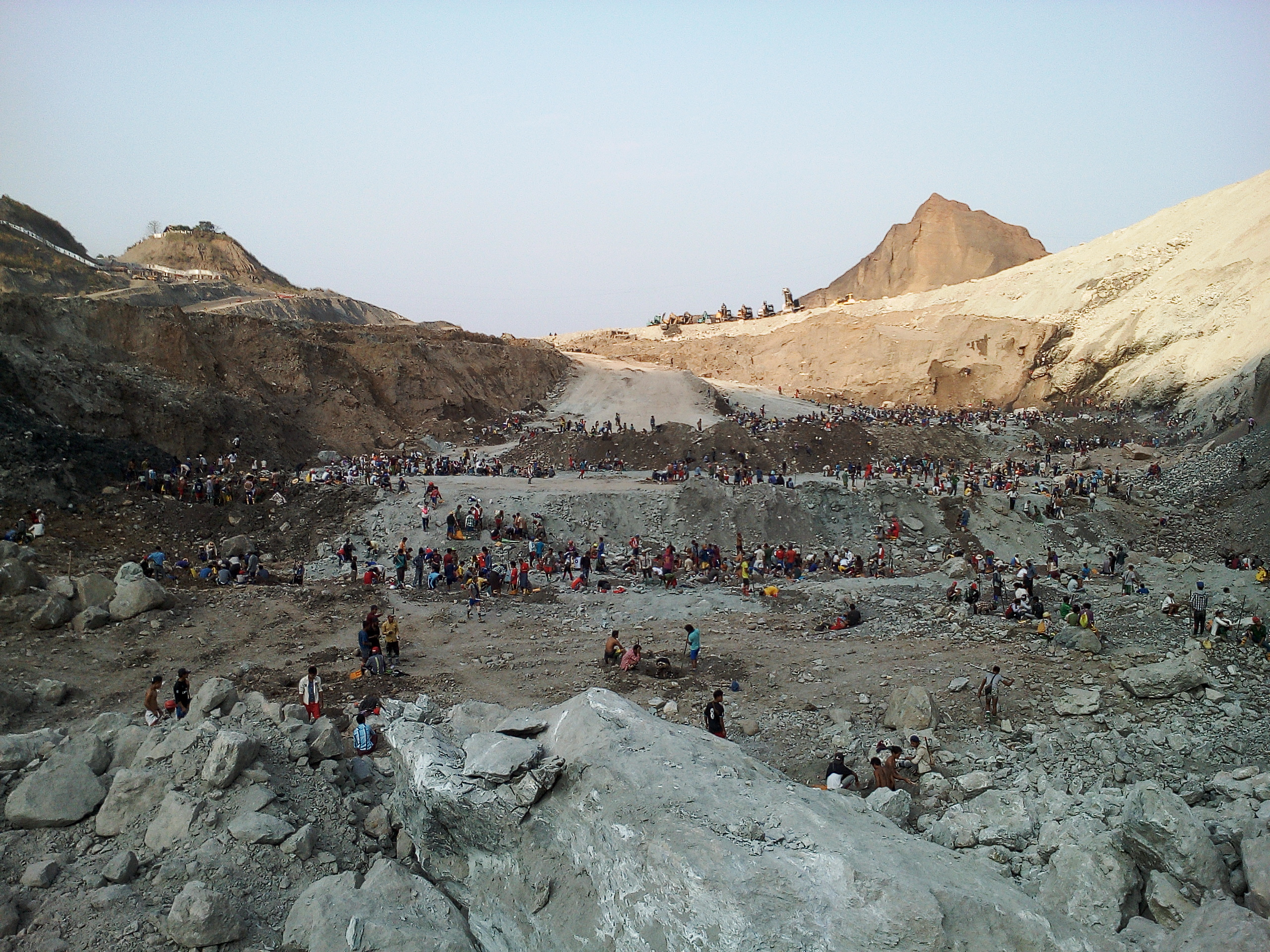
Jade mining in Kachin State

A 2021 study using six different remote sensing datasets, determined that poor design and mismanagement contributed to the disaster at the Wai Khar mine. The initial assumption, that the monsoon rains were the primary cause of the disaster, was not confirmed as the cumulative yearly rainfall at the mine was only 393 millimetres (15.5 in) which is lower than the annual average of 475 millimetres (18.7 in) suggesting that the slope wall was in a critical stress state even under normal weather conditions. The study determined that the walls of the mine were exceedingly steep given the weak rock structure around the pit, leading to periodic landslides between 2013 and 2020. In addition, piles of waste material at the site functioned as a sponge for groundwater and rainwater, and as a result leaking water led to erosion of the pit's walls.

== Aftermath ==
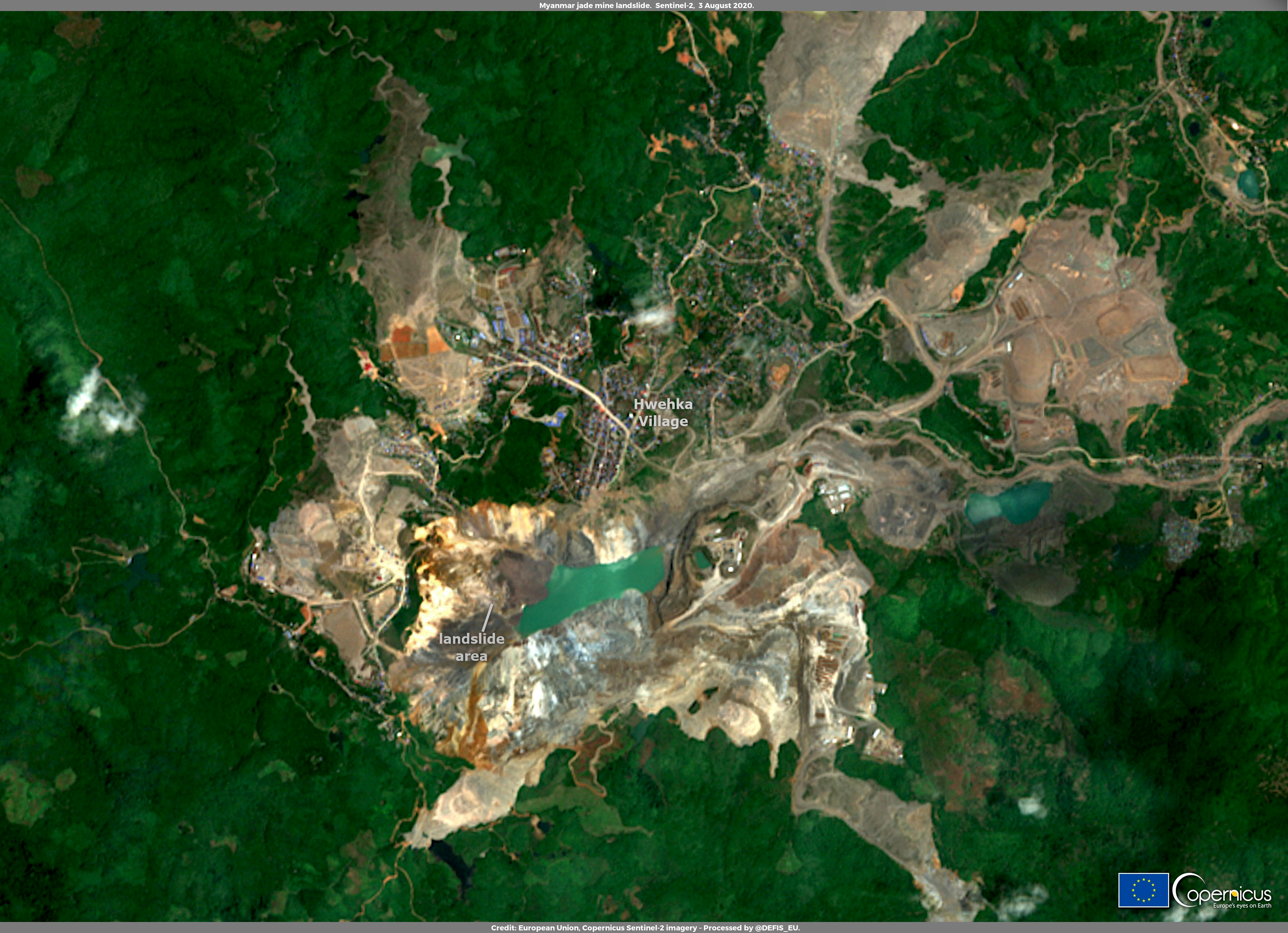
Satellite imagery of the site after the landslide

Families of the deceased were provided Ks.35,00,000/- (approx. US$2,500) in compensation by aid agencies and the government. However, in order to receive compensation a body had to be recovered, so no compensation was provided to the families of the missing.

The Myanmar Army removed Kachin Security and Border Affairs Minister Colonel Nay Lin Tun and another commander from their posts over the accident. Army spokesperson Brigadier General Zaw Min Tun stated that "they were responsible for reporting any trespassing in this restricted area" and that they failed in carrying this out. The Myanmar government set up an investigative body headed by Minister for Natural Resources and Environmental Conservation Ohn Win. Win, however, angered freelance miners when he suggested that the dead were "greedy". Aung San Suu Kyi, then de facto leader of Myanmar, blamed unemployment levels.

In the wake of the disaster, watchdog Global Witness issued a statement calling out the failure of the government to address hazardous mining practices and calling on the government to "immediately suspend large-scale, illegal and dangerous mining in Hpakant".

== See also ==
- Aberfan disaster, a similar disaster involving mining waste
