= MGE =

MGE is a three letter acronym, which may mean:

- Madison Gas and Electric
- Mahatma Gandhi Expressway
- Medial Ganglionic Eminence, a transitory structure in the development of the nervous system
- GM Medium Gasoline Engine
- MGE UPS Systems, maker of three-phase uninterruptible power supplies, a subsidiary of Schneider Electric since 2003
- MGE Office Protection Systems, maker of single-phase UPSes, bought from Schneider by Eaton Corporation in 2007
- Missouri Gas Energy, a natural gas distribution company
- Mobile genetic elements
- Modular GIS Environment
- Machine Gun Etiquette, an album by The Damned
- Myanma Gems Enterprise
- mg℮, a label of estimated mass (in milligrams)
