= Hpakant =

Town in Kachin State, Myanmar

Hpakant ဖားကန့်
- Town
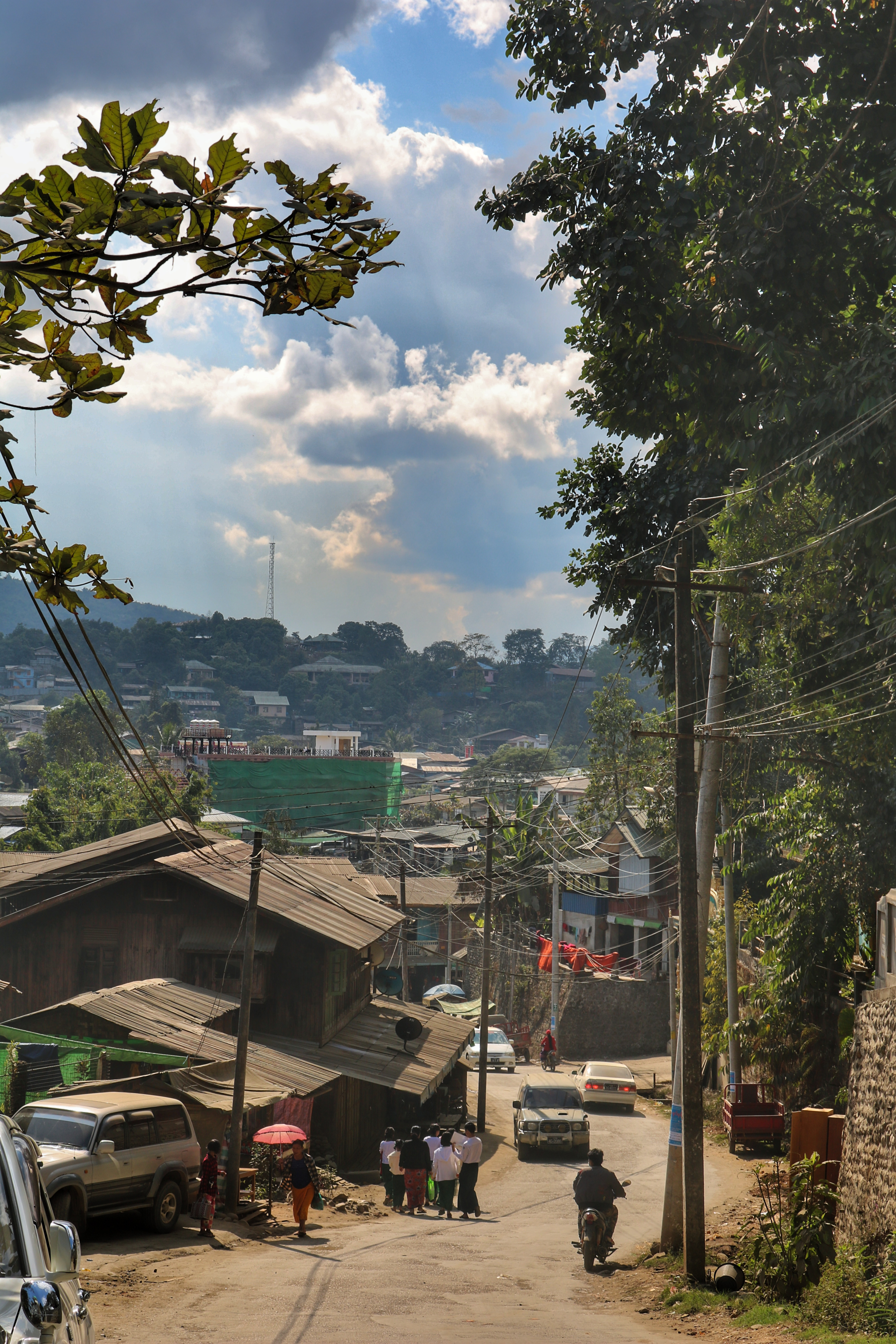

- Location in Myanmar (Burma)
- Coordinates: 25°36′46″N 96°18′41″E
- Country: Myanmar
- Division: Kachin State
- District: Mohnyin District
- Township: Hpakant Township

Population (2014)
  - Town: 312,278
  - Urban: 60,123
  - Rural: 252,155
  - Religions: Buddhism Christianity
- Time zone: UTC+6.30 (MMT)

Hpakant (Burmese: ဖားကန့်, Burmese pronunciation: [pʰá ga̰ɰ̃]; Shan: ၽႃၵၢၼ်ႉ, also Hpakan and Phakant) is a town in Hpakant Township, Kachin State in the northernmost part of Myanmar (Burma). It is located on the Uyu River 350 kilometres (220 mi) north of Mandalay. It is famous for its jade mines which produce gem-quality jadeite.

== History ==
The word Hpakant comes from the Shan language words for "rock fall" or "building up a wall." Hpakant was first established in 1832 as a village but shortly afterwards the village was destroyed in a landslide. Thereafter, Hpakant was established for the second time in 1836.

In 2011, fighting broke out between the Kachin Independence Army and the Myanmar Army in the area around the Hpakant jade mines, displacing an estimated 90,000 people by September 2012 and killing hundreds of others.

== Political economy ==
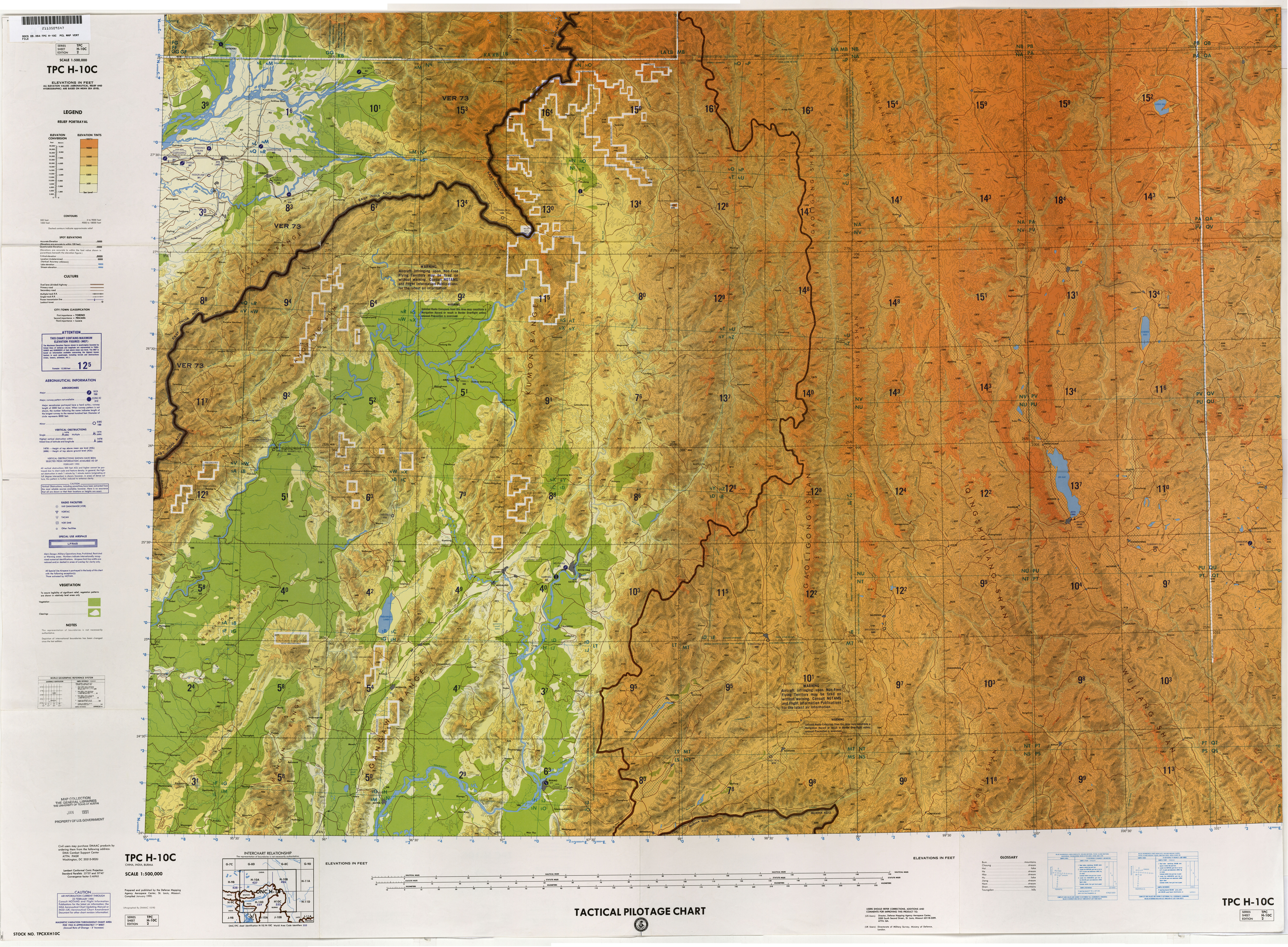
Map including the Hpakant area (DMA, 1990)

Since after the Kachin Independence Army (KIA) came into the area before negotiating a ceasefire agreement with Burma's military government in the early 1990s, heroin is no longer openly on sale on the streets of Hpakant. Both addicts and drug dealers were rounded up, taken to the nearby Uru River, shot and their bodies dumped in the river.

Concerns have been expressed regarding the encroachment on and destruction of the environment from deforestation and landslides resulting from mining activities and consequent flooding. The Uru River has also been affected by the dumping of soil. There have been instances of locals being forced to leave their homes when upland areas were bulldozed by the big mining companies.

The KIA however lost control of the jade mines once the ceasefire had been arranged, and firms from China, Hong Kong and Singapore started to operate in the area after winning concessions from the government. More recently however the mining contracts went to the well known Burmese tycoon Tay Za's Htoo Group and also to Myanmar Dagaung Co Ltd, a subsidiary of the Hong Pang Group headed by Wei Hsueh-kang, a former drug trafficker and leader of the Wa insurgent group UWSA turned entrepreneur after the cease-fire deal.

Maran Brang Seng, former chairman of the Kachin Independence Organisation (KIO) from 1976 until he died in 1994, was born in Hpakant in 1930.

== Mining hazards ==
One thousand miners apparently drowned in 2000 when flood waters of the Uru River rushed into the underground mines, but the news was hushed up by the authorities, according to the locals. An explosion at Hpakant Gyi mine on New Year's Eve 2008 killed two miners and injured seven. It is owned by another one of the ethnic ceasefire groups, the Pa-O National Army (PNA), headed by Aung Kham Hti.

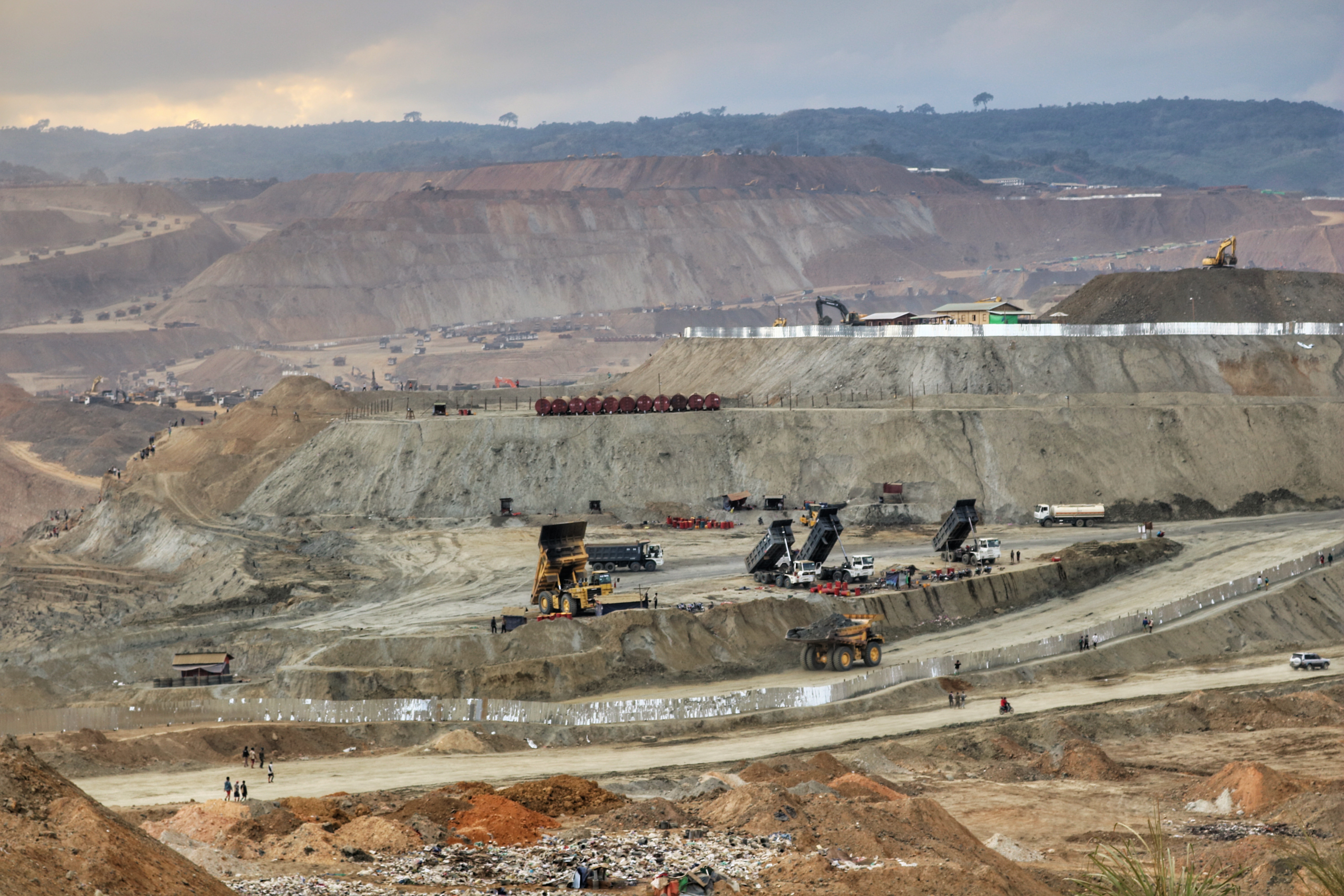
A large jade mine in Hpakant

More than 30 (and up to 70) people are believed to have been killed in a massive landslide near Hpakant in early July 2009; official figures are not available. The flood waters swept away homes, blocked roads and cut communications. The disaster is being blamed on jade mining, which creates large deposits of debris that block heavy rain from reaching natural rivers and drainage, including the Uru river.

About 100 jade mining companies operate in the Hpakant area. The Kachin Environmental Organization, based on the Sino-Burmese border, says that people living in the Hpakant area had appealed to the companies not to dump waste near the Uru River and to avoid environmental damage. The companies enjoy government backing, however, and local complaints are regularly ignored.

Over 100 people were killed in a landslide in the 22 November 2015 Hpakant jade mine disaster. Most of those killed were people living near the waste heap, who made their living scavenging through waste soil looking for jade remnants. At least 15 jade seekers in a closed mine were killed and 45 injured by a landslide in July 2018. Six people were killed in the April 2019 Hpakant jade mine collapse. More than 162 people were killed in a landslide in the 2 July 2020 Hpakant jade mine disaster. In 2021, a landslide at a jade mine killed 20 and swept up to 100 people into a lake. On 13 August 2023 a landslide killed 32 people in the 2023 Hpakant jade mine disaster. Another 32 people were killed during a similar landslide in Hpakant in the early hours of 13 January 2025.
