= Jade trade in Myanmar =

The jade trade in Myanmar consists of the mining, distribution, and manufacture of jadeite—a variety of jade—in the nation of Myanmar (Burma). The jadeite deposits found in Myanmar's northern regions are the source of the highest quality jadeite in the world, noted by sources in China going as far back as the 10th century. Chinese culture places significant weight on the meaning of jade; as their influence has grown in Myanmar, so has the jade industry and the practice of exporting the precious mineral.

Myanmar produces upward of 70 percent of the world's supply of high-quality jadeite. Most of the Myanmar's jadeite is exported to other nations, primarily Asian, for use in jewellery, art, and ornaments. The majority of the production is carried out by Myanma Gem Enterprise (MGE), a state-owned venture which has enough liquid assets to run itself for 172 years.

== Geography of jade deposits ==
Jadeite in Myanmar is primarily found in the "Jade Tract" located in Lonkin Township in Kachin State in northern Myanmar which encompasses the alluvial region of the Uyu River between the 25th and 26th parallels. Present-day extraction of jade in this region occurs at the Phakant-gyi, Maw Sisa, Tin Tin, and Khansee mines. Khansee is also the only mine that produces Maw Sit Sit, a type of jade. Mines at Tawmaw and Hweka are mostly exhausted. From to 1964 to 1981, mining was exclusively an enterprise of the Myanmar government. In 1981, 1985, and 1995, the Gemstone laws were modified to allow increasing private enterprise. In addition to this region, there are also notable mines in the neighboring Sagaing District, near the towns of Nasibon and Natmaw and Hkamti.

== Extraction of jade ==
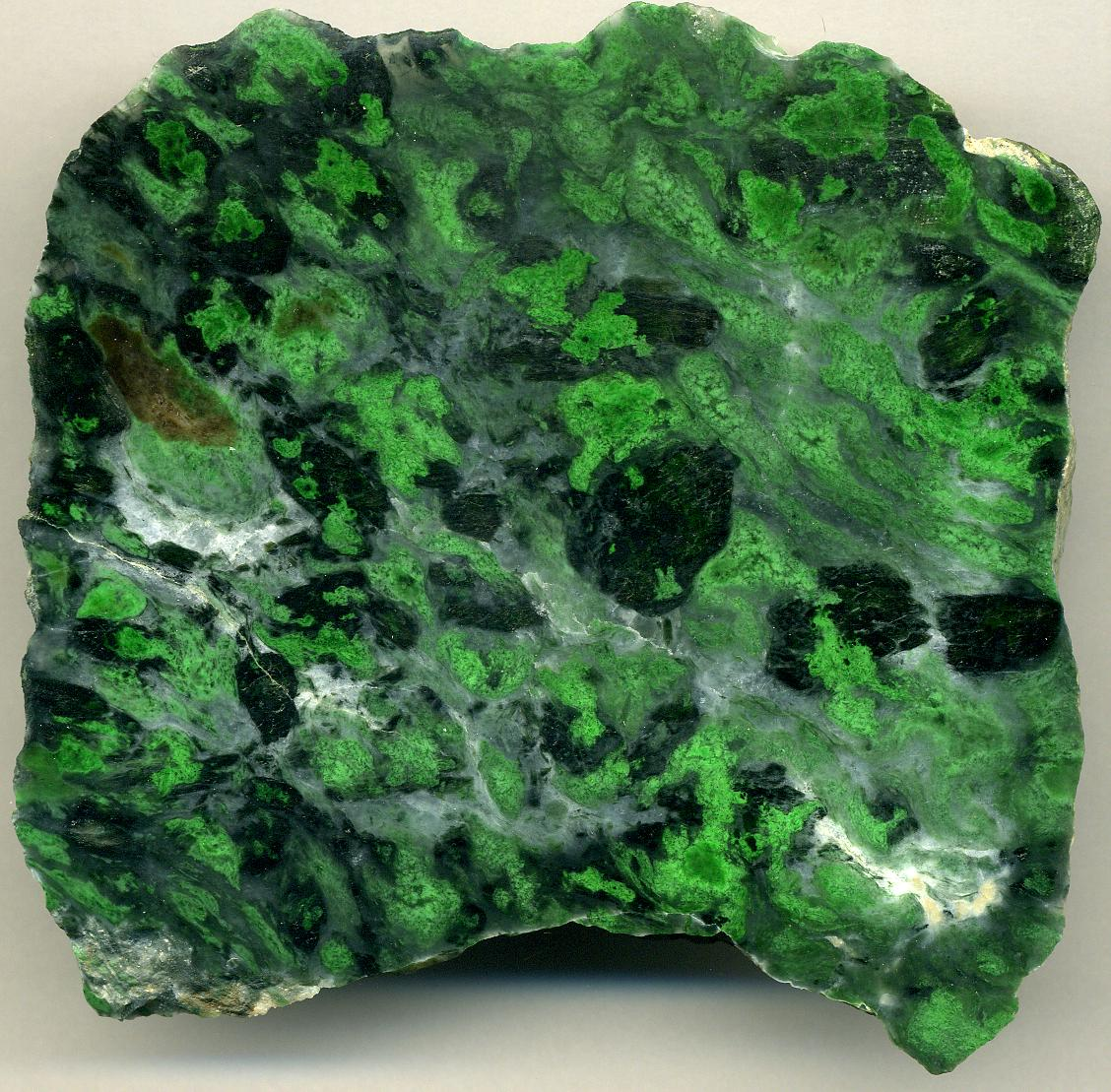
Jade mined in Myanmar.

Much of the extraction of jade in Myanmar is done by “boulder mining” which consists of removing the “overburden” layer of alluvial material to expose the rocks below, then separating the jade containing rocks and discarding the waste in a river. It is also found as water-worn pebbles in riverbeds. The skin of the boulder varies in thickness depending upon whether it is from the alluvial district or from the surrounding hills. Many of the old practices, mentioned in older books, have long since been abandoned. Now, modern methods are used. At the Maw Sisa mine, for example, large boulders are extracted by heavy earth-moving machines and then moved by truck to the nearby river for washing and processing. Since the jade is often encased in stone and cutting into the stone can harm the quality of the jade, a variety of methods were previously used to be employed by miners and merchants to identify jadeite containing stones, including observation for surface coloration, identification of the sound made upon tapping them with metal tools, and feeling of subtle differences in surface adhesion of the rock to skin when in water. These practices have mostly been abandoned. Today, Myanma Gems Enterprise (MGE) cuts through the whole boulder to reveal pockets of jade (see previous citation).

== Background ==
Jade holds a significant place in the Chinese culture as it is believed to be a bridge between heaven and hell. This belief stems from the antiquity associated with the gem as well as the virtues of righteousness and knowledge it symbolizes. Jade's virtues, such as fine texture, immense toughness and high hardness, contribute to the high luster and transparency, as well as the durability to withstand a high polish. The Chinese believe that the wearer of jade will be constantly reminded of the strength in resilience and toughness that build one's character. Thus by wearing jade, one is more virtuous by living these values. There is also a popular belief that jade protects the wearer from disasters and guides his/her fortune. For example, jade would break in the eve of a bad event as a warning to the wearer. However, a jade ornament will appear more brilliant and transparent if good fortune lies ahead.

=== Origins ===
It has been suggested that the production of Burmese jadeite might stretch as far back as the Pyu city-states period in Myanmar (roughly third to eighth centuries CE) on relatively small scales. The first indications of long-distance trade of the gem begin during the reign of Burma's King Anawratha (1044) to the kingdom of Nancho (present-day Yunnan province) and Beijing in China.The king, being a religious man and believing that the Chinese emperor possessed the relics of Buddha, wished to obtain some relics from the Chinese emperor in exchange for Burmese imperial jade. This pattern of trading jade for other artifacts has existed since then. During the Ming dynasty (1368-1644), jade was traded to China through Yunnan via caravan trade, but no notable pieces from this era are known to exist, as the Ming dynasty was more interested in ceramics. Some of the first jadeite artifacts begin to appear in tombs around this time in China. During subsequent dynasties, particularly during the reign of the Qianlong Emperor (1735–96), there was an explosion of interest in jade from Burma. The Qianlong Emperor went to extraordinary lengths to obtain green jade, and when the Burmese king refused to provide him with tribute, the emperor went to war against Burma. The war was a disaster for the Chinese emperor. His army suffered multiple failures, leading the Qianlong Emperor to say "my finest soldiers were scalded, divided, driven into gullies like cows in a pond. They perished pile on pile. My generals are a joke." The disgraced general Mingjui committed suicide. After this defeat, the Burmese king agreed to a peace treaty, which was signed in 1770 and allowed the export of jade to China. During the reign of Burma's King Mindon (1857–78), the jade trade flourished and expanded. King Mindon allowed the Chinese lapidaries to locate in Mandalay, where they could buy, process, and trade in jade between Burma and China and within Burma. Those lapidaries were expanded and continue to exist to this day.

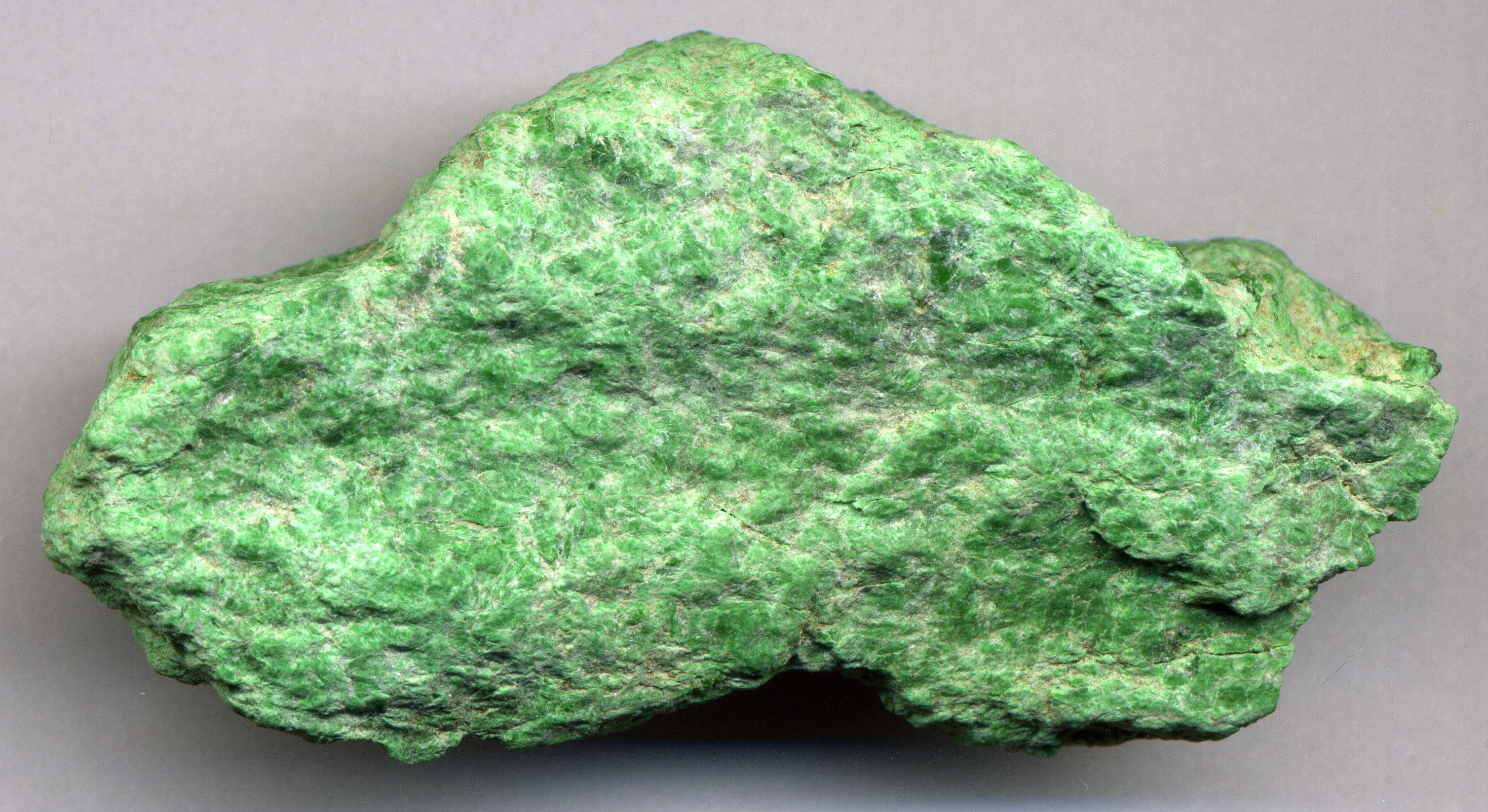
Chromian jade found in western Kachin State.

Based on artifacts recovered in China, the volume of green jade traded through Yunnan increased through the end of the Ming dynasty and the during the beginning of the Qing dynasty. W. Warry, a member of the Chinese Consular Service on an expedition to Burma in 1888 writes the following about the origin of Chinese demand for jade based on local lore.

The discovery that green jade of fine quality occurred in Northern Burma was made accidentally by a small Yunnanese trader in the thirteenth century. The story runs that on returning from a journey across the frontier he picked up a piece of stone to balance the load on his mule. The stone proved to be jade of great value and a large party went back to procure more of it. In this errand they were unsuccessful, nobody being able to inform them where the stone occurred. Another attempt, equally fruitless, was made by the Yunnan Government in the fourteenth century to discover the stone; all the members of the expedition, it is said, perished by malaria, or at the hands of hostile hill-tribes. From this time onwards, for several centuries, no further exploration in the jade country seems to have been undertaken by the Chinese. Small pieces of the stone occasionally found their way across the frontier, but the exact source of the supply continued unknown.

— W. Warry, Burma Gazetteer: Myitkyina District (1888)

Jade has been associated with China going as far back as the Liangzhu culture (3400-2250 BC) but this jade was primarily nephrite, a milky white stone more common than the green Burmese jadeite. Often the stone was used in the presence of copper in order to give the illusion of a deeper green color without access to jadeite. As stated in the previous paragraph, most notably during the Qing dynasty, during the Qianlong Emperor's lifetime, he acquired much jade from Burma. He and his court had a particular taste for the Burmese jadeite, or feicui as it was referred to. Empress Dowager Cixi (1835-1908 CE) was particularly noted for her interest in the stone, often using her political position to acquire the stone and using it in her public clothing. Trade continued under her reign.

=== Before 1949 ===
During the mid-18th century there was an expansion of jade mining and its subsequent export to China as a result of increased Chinese influence over the region, the discovery of new jade quarries, and growing demand for the gem among wealthy Chinese. With the support of the Burmese government, regular trade routes between the jade tract and China traveling north into Yunnan were established as early as 1798. Due to Kachin hostility this route was later replaced by overland trade along the Irrawaddy river as part of established cotton trading routes under the official sanction of the Burmese Crown, establishing Mogaung as the center for trade and taxation of Burmese jade production. The Kachins were granted ownership over the jade they mined in return for paying fees on the transport of their goods beyond Mogaung.

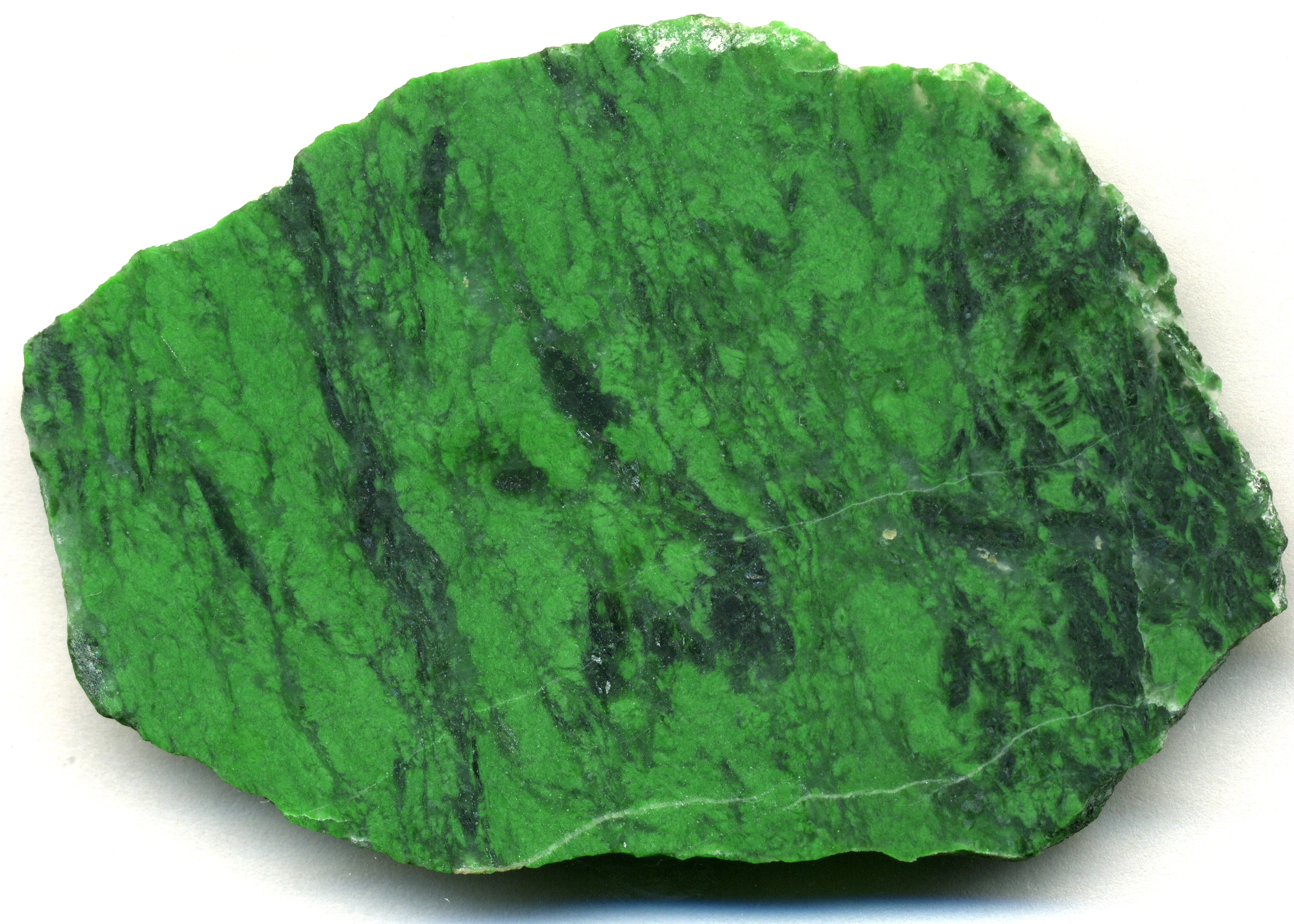
Maw sit sit, a kosmochlor-rich jade rock from Myanmar's Kachin state jade mines.

In 1861, as a result of loosening restrictions on coastal trade to China, Cantonese merchants mounted an expedition to Mandalay and brought back jade for trade, beginning the new practice of jade being imported to China via maritime routes. From this point onward the majority of the high-quality stone produced in Burma made its way into China through cities like Guangzhou, Hong Kong and Shanghai, whereas much of the medium-quality stone was still transported overland. During this period there was increased friction between Yunnanese gemstone miners and the Burmese crown over taxation and ownership of the gems leading to several periods of passive resistance carried out by the jade miners including the practice of production limiting.

In 1885, after the Third Anglo-Burmese War, the British seized control of the mines and, after a two-year period of conflict with the Kachin duwa, gained complete control over the jade mines. Having little experience in jade, the British set up regulations that controlled the mines. H. H. Keely became the administrator of the mines. Under British colonial rule the jade trade continued mostly unhindered, except by wars in China and Burma, up until the end of the Chinese Civil War. In 1942, Burma came under the control of the Japanese Imperial Army. They stripped the mines of all equipment and carried away all machinery and power equipment, to be used in their war effort. All jade mining activity ceased. In 1945, the British regained Burma but little progress was made in rehabilitating the mines, due to unsettled political conditions. Further conflict ensured after Mao Tse Tung launched his war against the Nationalist Chinese government.

=== After 1949 ===
After Burmese independence in 1948, some semblance of mining and trade returned under the civil government.

The end of the Chinese Civil War closed Yunnan's border and brought the jade trade with China to a halt. Consequently, the jade produced in the Kachin state was now transported by rail to Rangoon where it was then exported by sea to Hong Kong. This trade continued until the 1962 military coup in Burma, which nationalized the economy. In March 1969, the Burmese junta declared all gemological resources to be the property of the Myanmar state; private transactions involving such resources were declared illegal, virtually halting the trade. Smuggling exploded, and the Kachin ethnic minority operated surreptitiously, making the area unstable.

Jade traders fleeing across the border to Thailand as a result of nationalization began to create networks to facilitate the trade of Burmese jade through Thailand, originally through the border crossing at the town Mae Sai, Mae Sot, and Mae Hong Song. The transport of jade to the border often required the services of caravan companies that carried the jade by pack animal from the Mandalay onward to border towns where jade could be smuggled into Thailand. In 1966 the first jade trading company, The Qiujia Company, was founded in Thailand, which used connections to both border militias and the Thai government to facilitate transport of Burmese jade from the border to buyers in Hong Kong. Trading companies often served the role of providing capital services and risk insurance for jade sellers in the event of lost or stolen products. Often these companies would have preferential relationships with clients that had a reputation for skillfully identifying valuable jade stones for sale. Smuggling also took placer at the Ruili border crossing to China and Lwejel.

New trading companies opened operations at different Burmese-Thai border towns, resulting in the flow of jade through many sections of the border, notably the town of Chiang Mai where Yunnanese refugees could obtain temporary permits to cross the border into Thailand. The jade companies were usually aligned with a particular Burmese border militia which oversaw the flow of trade on the Burmese side of the border. Two notable militias were the KMT lead for a time by Mi Li and the army led by Khun Sa. Both armies often violently competed for control of black market trade of opium and other black market goods as well as jade for their respective trading companies. Additionally, expansion of Burmese government authority over the border regions during this period often resulted in changes to the black market smuggling of jade across the border.

After 1962, General Ne Win nationalized the mines and prohibited private mining and sale of jade and gems. All such trade was to be conducted only through the Ministry of Mines. From 1964 onwards, the Ministry of Mines set up the Myanmar Gems Enterprise to manage the sale of jade at government-controlled auctions in Rangoon. Smuggling of small quantities of jade continued, however. The Ministry of Mines now conducted the extraction and sale of jade exclusively through their auctions (emporiums). From 1964 to 1975, dollar volume of jade sales remained less than $1 million. The first time jade sales reached more than $1 million was in 1976. The amount of jade sold in dollar terms achieved $1 billion in 2010. Restrictions on private mining enterprises slowly eased throughout the 1980s and 1990s (see above).

== Present-day ==
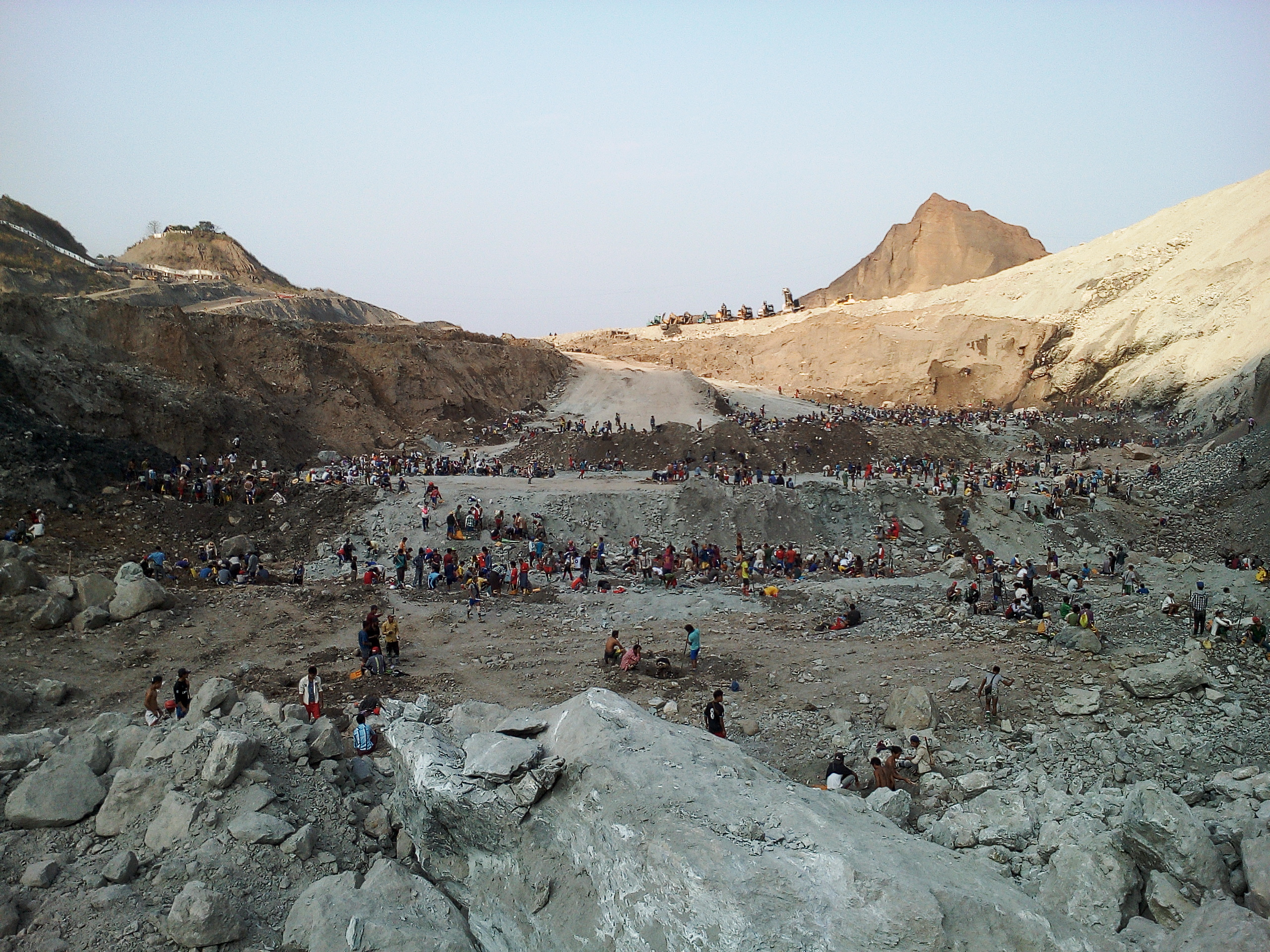
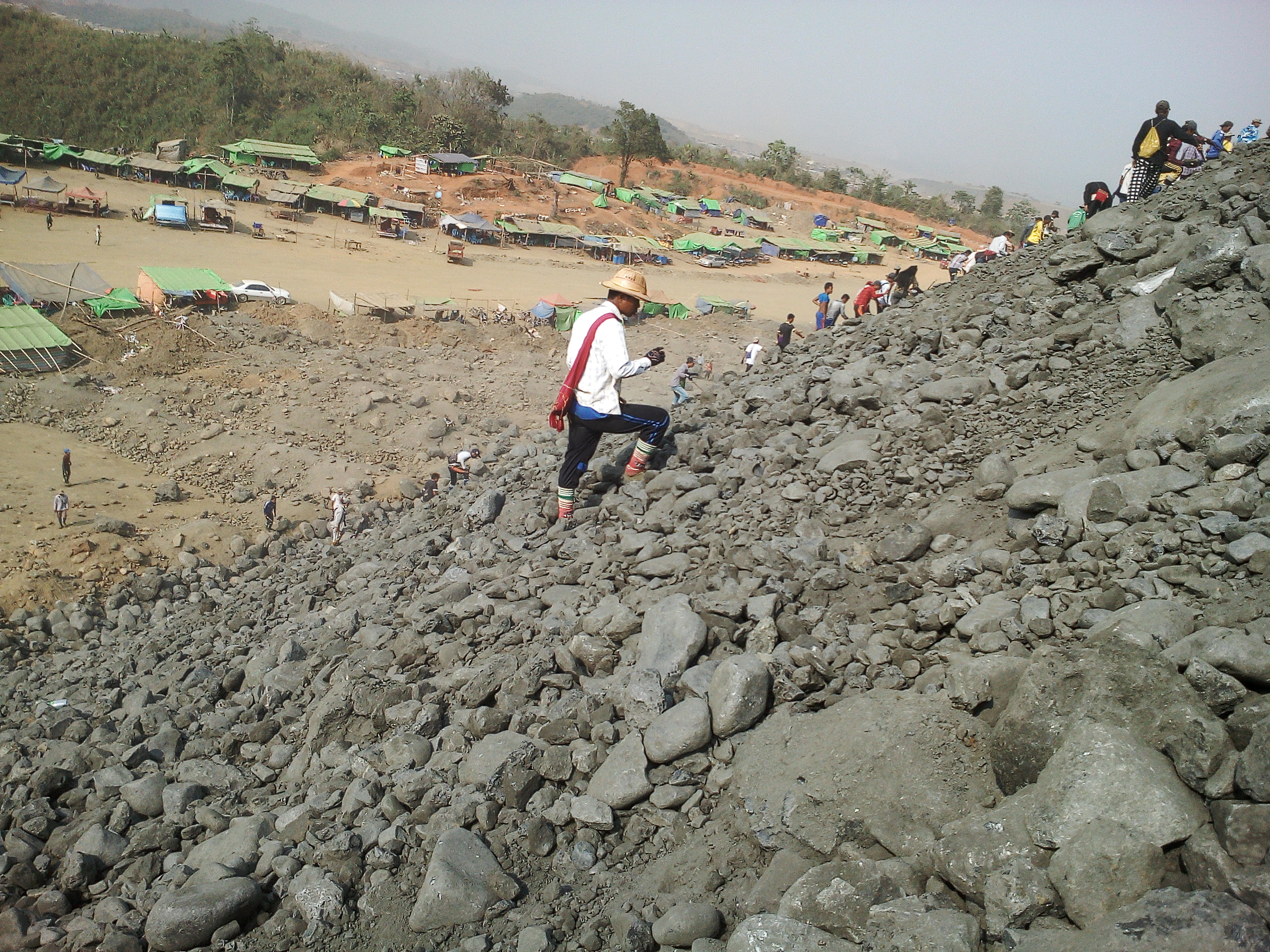
Hpakant jade mine

Until the capital of Myanmar was moved from Yangon (formerly Rangoon) to Naypyidaw, jade auctions were held in the city. The auction procedure was open only to invited buyers. Buyers were given time to view and examine the jade boulders with provisions for light, water, and other paraphernalia necessary for close examination. The auction was held over a 10-day period, with viewing occurring the first day, along with auctions of gems and pearls, followed by auction of jade. All registered buyers received catalogues and an assigned bidder number, which had to be recorded on their bid form. Bid forms were collected by MGE officials and opened by the auction committee.

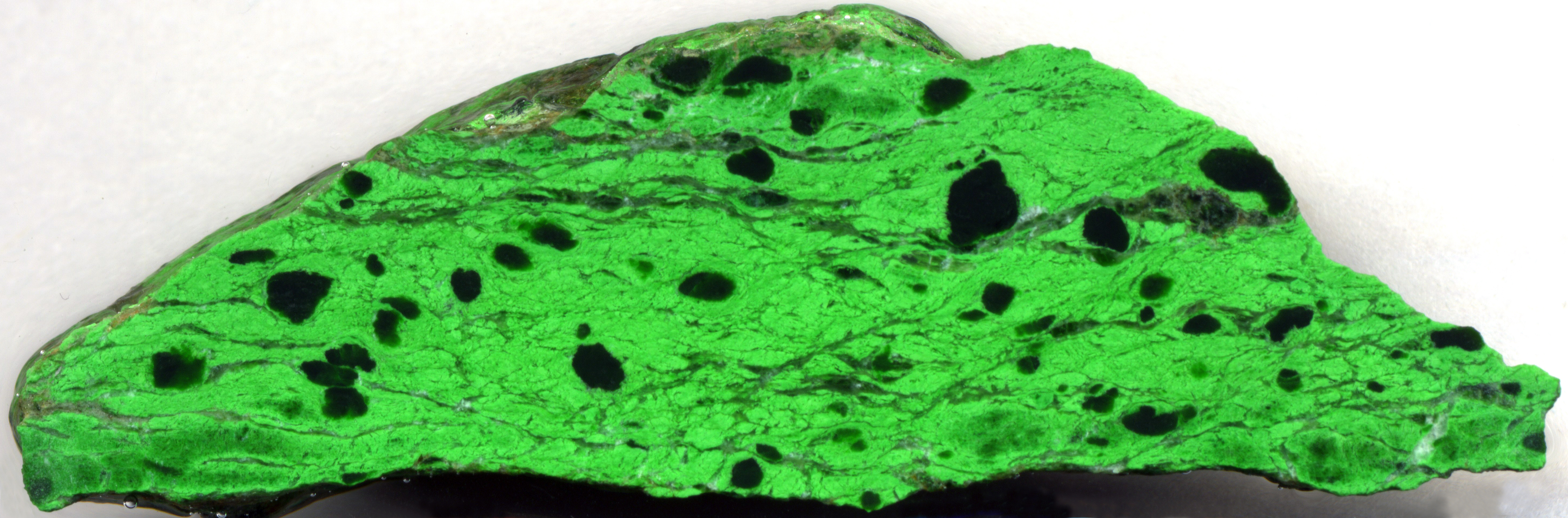
One of the many variants of jade found in Myanmar.

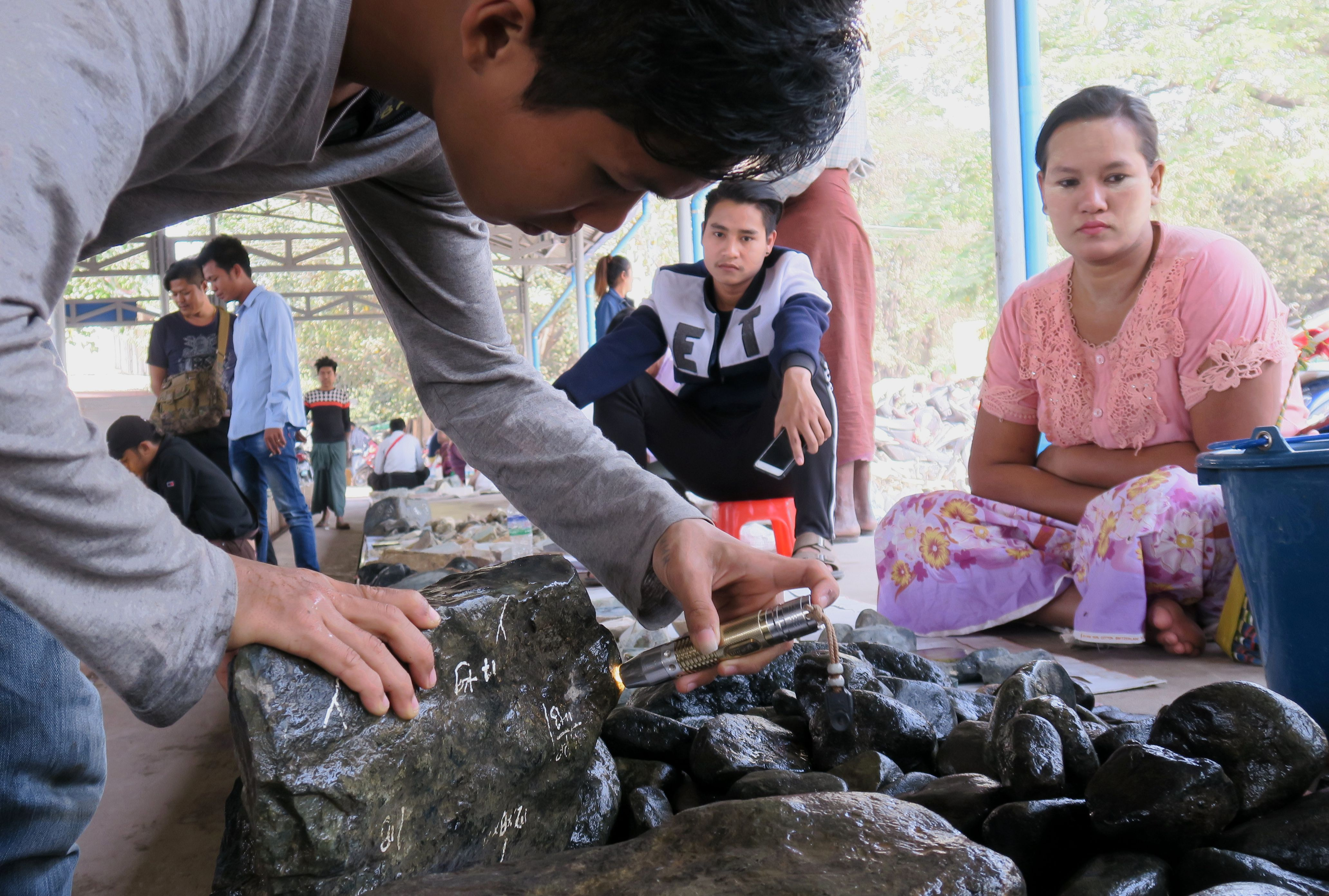
Jade rock inspection with a portable UV LED flashlight in Mandalay Jade Market.

MGE classifies jade into Imperial jade (7 grades): grade A brings the highest price. The catalog then lists Commercial jade (also 7 grades): higher grades of commercial jade, both cabochons and rough, are priced very close to imperial jade. The third grade is Utility jade, which is of such quality that it can be used only for carving and made into cups and saucers and other decorative items. This utility jade is commonly bleached and dyed. After the capital was moved to Naypyidaw, auctions were held there.

In the 1990s ceasefire agreements between the Burmese government and ethnic militias have opened up the jade business to third parties. Under the 1995 Myanmar Gemstone Law private individuals were once again officially given the rights to private ownership and sale of jade in exchange for a 10% tax on jade export which further expanded the jade market in Myanmar and lead to an influx of people seeking fortune to begin mining in the jade tract. Recently Myanmar's jade industry has expanded substantially in response to increasing demand for the stone in Chinese markets with jade export revenues rising from $150–300 million USD in the early 2000s to US$1.75 billion during the 2010-2011 fiscal year, which accounts for a fifth of Myanmar's total export revenue. Since 2010, the volume and dollar sales have reached astronomical levels. However, recent claims by Global Witness of sales of $31 billion remain unsubstantiated. MGE reports sales of US$61 million in second half of 2015.

Conflict between the Burmese army (Tatmadaw) and the Kachin Independence Organization (KIO) have had a severe impact of jade extraction and transportation. In 2015 the Burmese government negotiated peace agreements with 15 of the 17 ethnic groups, but conflict between the Tatmadaw and the KIO's army continues. As a matter of fact, the war between the two sides has intensified, causing great uncertainty about the future of Myanmar's jade trade.

=== International sanctions ===
As a response to the government's handling of the 2007 Saffron Revolution several nations have issued sanctions against the Burmese gemstone market. One such act is Tom Lantos Block Burmese JADE (Junta's Anti-Democratic Efforts) Act of 2008 which prevents import of Burmese gemstones to the United States through intermediary parties. The sanctions by western nations against the Burmese gemstone markets have primarily been ineffective in the case of jade since much of the demand for Burmese jade is fueled by China which did not take part in the sanctions.

=== Exploitation ===
Myanmar's jade trade makes up almost half of the nation's GDP. A 2015 report indicated that the trade is largely exploited by the nation's elites who have a controlling interest in the industry. It was ascertained that in 2014, Myanmar's ruling elite had appropriated roughly US$31 billion worth of jade, figuring nearly 50% of the nation's economy.

Global Witness estimated that corrupt politicians and connected businessmen had stolen approximately US$122.8 billion of jade over the past decade, and stated that Myanmar's jade trade is possibly the greatest natural resource racket around the world in modern history. It was also determined that over a hundred active jade mines are controlled by no more than fifteen of the same military-connected individuals. The inhabitants of jade-producing areas live in squalor while the elites profit heavily.

=== Accidents ===
Accidents are frequent at mining sites in Myanmar. In 2015 a landslide killed at least 116 people in the Hpakant jade mine disaster. In 2019, 50 workers were buried in the April 2019 Hpakant jade mine collapse, resulting in the death of four of them and two rescue workers. In the 2020 Hpakant jade mine disaster, at least 172 people were killed. As many as 100 people are feared missing after a landslide at a jade mine in Myanmar in December 2021. In August 2023, 34 miners are missing and eight hospitalized after a landslide consisting of wall of mud, rocks and floodwater at a jade mine in Hpakant. The people fell from around 300 meter height into a lake.
