= MTE =

The abbreviation MTE or M.T.E. may refer to:

- Materiel de Traction Electrique joint subsidiary of Creusot-Loire and Jeumont-Schneider
- MAC-then-Encrypt (MtE), one of approaches to Authenticated encryption
- Mathematical Table Errata, an increasingly numbered periodical column about errors in mathematical tables in the journal Mathematics of Computation
- MCA Television Entertainment, a former division of Universal Television
- Arm Memory Tagging Extension, a hardware implementation of tagged memory
- The Metabolic Theory of Ecology, which argues that ecological phenomena result from metabolic constraints
- The Brazilian Ministry of Labor and Employment
- Multicultural Toronto English, a sociolect dialect spoken by youth culture living in Southern Ontario, particularly the Greater Toronto Area.
- Myanma Timber Enterprise, a state-owned timber company
