= University of Forestry (Yezin) =

University in Myanmar

Coordinates: 19°50′10.1″N 96°16′38.1″E

University of Forestry and Environmental Science (Yezin)
- သစ်တောနှင့်ပတ်ဝန်းကျင်ဆိုင်ရာ တက္ကသိုလ် (ရေဆင်း)
- Former names: Institute of Forestry (1992); University of Forestry (2002)
- Motto: Knowledge Professional Service
- Type: public
- Established: 1923; 103 years ago
- Affiliations: Ministry of Natural Resources and Environmental Conservation
- Rector: Khin Maung Sint
- Administrative staff: 120
- Students: 100 students per intake
- Location: Yezin, Nay Pyi Taw, Myanmar
- Website: www.ufes.edu.mm

The University of Forestry and Environmental Science (Yezin) (Burmese: သစ်တောနှင့်ပတ်ဝန်းကျင်ဆိုင်ရာ တက္ကသိုလ် (ရေဆင်း), pronounced [θɪʔtɔ́ tɛʔkəθò (jèzɪ́ɰ̃)]), in Yezin near Nay Pyi Taw, is the only university specialized in forestry and environmental science in Myanmar. Founded in 1923 as the Forestry Department of Yangon University, in 1992, the University of Forestry and Environmental Science became a separate entity based in Yezin, Nay Pyi Taw. It mainly offers a five-year Bachelor of Science degree program in forestry and environmental science as well as two-year master's and three-year doctoral programs. The university is administered by the Ministry of Natural Resources and Environmental Conservation. Undergraduate students are required to take part in a field training program each winter from the third year. Graduates of the university typically become forestry officers at the Forestry Department, the Dry Zone Greening Department, the Environmental Conservation Department or the Myanma Timber Enterprise. Others find employment in non-governmental conservation organizations such as FREDA, UNDP, UNEP, FAO, JICA, WCS, WWF, FFI and other local and international research institutions and conservation organizations.

International collaboration includes staff training with the German Academic Exchange programme (DAAD); research cooperation with Kyoto University, (Japan); postgraduate scholarships with Ritsumeikan University (Japan) and engagement in regional networks such as the Mekong Wetland network and Himalayan Universities Consortium.

== History ==
Forestry education in Myanmar was first offered in Yangon University since 1923 and the first batch graduated in 1925. In 1985, the forestry study was moved to the Yezin campus, under the purview of the Department of Forestry at the Yezin Institute of Agriculture. In 1992, the Forestry Department was carved out and founded as the Institute of Forestry (Yezin). In 1996, post graduates courses were offered. In 2003, it was renamed the University of Forestry (Yezin). The Bachelor of Science (Forestry), B.Sc. (Forestry) degree, program used to take six years to complete; it has since been changed to five years program. In October 2017, the name was retitled as University of Forestry and Environmental Science, and offers both forestry and environmental subjects. It is the only institution majoring forestry and environment science in the Republic of Union of Myanmar. It is also one of the higher educational institution in Myanmar.

== Admissions ==
The annual intake of students has always been low. Up to 2005, the intake was only 50. No female students were admitted until 1995. Even now, female students make up just 5% to 10% of each incoming class; male candidates are given priority.. From 2011, the annual intake was 100 students- 80% male and 20% female.

To be eligible for admission of undergraduate program in the University, a candidate must: be Myanmar citizen with existing laws and regulations at the time of application; pass matriculation examination with science major-Myanmar, English, Mathematics, Physics, Chemistry and Biology; obtain (360) marks above in total at the matriculation examination; fit for field study (pass physical test by respective public hospital); and pass 20-mile physical test.

== Programs ==
The University offers a five-year bachelor's degree Program and a two-year master's degree program as well as doctoral program. The language instruction is English, and practical experiment, field study, presentation and interactive discussion, and final exam are compulsory.

1. Bachelor's Degree

Bachelor of Science (Forestry), and

1. Master's Degree

Master of Science (Forestry)

== Collaboration with other institutions ==
The University has collaboration with international institutions to offer better education to students, and to become a higher educational institution in Myanmar.

1. Academic cooperation with Emst-Moritz-Amdt-University Greifswald (EMAU), Germany
2. Improving the capacity of academic staff in collaboration with Natural Resources Institute Finland (LUKE)
3. Academic cooperation and student exchange with Kyoto University, Japan
4. Development of specimens collection in collaboration with Japanese Wildlife Research Center (JWRC)
5. Academic cooperation with Wildlife Conservation Society (WCS) Program, Myanmar

== Faculty ==
There are two main faculties- Faculty of Forestry and Environmental Science. Under the faculty of Forestry, there are three main departments: department of sustainable forestry and forest ecology; department of soil, water and climate; and department of biodiversity and wildlife conservation. For the faculty of environmental science, there are three main departments: department of environmental economics, policy and management; department of natural resource management; and department of pollution control and management.

== Campus facility ==
In the University of Forestry and Environmental Science, residential facilities are provided for all students for their safe, clean, comfortable and affordable living environment. The University Campus has 3 hostels - Yan Myo Aung; Yan Aung Myin; and Moe Ma Kha. Students can reach to any buildings including their class rooms by walking.

Within the campus, all students can participate in the followings:

1. Associations of literature and culture;
2. Locality-based student clubs;
3. Seminars talks;
4. Essay & impromptu contests;
5. Sport activities;
6. Religious activities;

Moreover, The University has high cultural and ethnic diversity as students come from around the country, and education is open to all irrespective of gender, race or social status.

== Professors/Head of Department of Forestry, Yangon University (1952-1991) ==
1. C.W.D.Kermode (1952-1958)
2. U Thein Han (1958-1959)
3. U Kyi (1959 - 1966)
4. U Tun Kyaw(1966-1974)
5. U Khin Maung Aye(1974-1975)
6. U Ye Lian Swam(1976-1982)
7. U Soe Kyi (1983 - 1991)

== List of rectors (1992 to present) ==
1. Saw Yan Aung C Doo (1992–1995)
2. U Soe Tint (1995-1996)
3. U Aung Kyin (1996–2000)
4. U Aung Than (2000–2001)
5. U Win Kyi (2002–2007)
6. U Khin Maung Zaw (2007–2010)
7. Dr. Myint Oo (2010–2019)
8. Dr. San Win (2019–2020)
9. Dr. Khin Maung Sint (2020–present)

== Notable alumni ==
Dr. Kyaw Tint: Director General (Retired) of Forest Department. He is considered as a god father of the contemporary forestry in Myanmar, due to his profound contributions to the sustainable forest management in Myanmar.

U Ohn Win: Graduated in 1976. M.S. (US), Union Minister, Ministry of Natural Resources and Environmental Conservation (2016 ~2021 )

U Tin Tun: Graduated in 1978. M.Sc. (AU), Member of the Nay Pyi Taw City Development Committee (2016 ~2021)

Dr. Moe Myint: Graduated in 1986. M.Sc. (AIT), D. Tech. Sc (AIT), M.S (Yale). very First Forestry Graduate from Yezin (before Forestry Graduates were from Yangon University). Outstanding Student. Contributing Forest management, Forest Inventory, Spatial Technology applications in Forestry sector and Statistics and Modeling tools for Forestry.

Win Myo Thu: Graduated in 1986. M.Sc. (AIT). Contributed to Community Forestry Development, Rural Development, Poverty Reduction, Renewable Energy Development and NGO sector Development in Myanmar. Member of EITI Myanmar and one of the top Environmentalists in country.

Tin Aung Moe: Graduated in 1994 Apr. M.Sc. (AIT). Served in AIT-UNEP's Regional Resource Center, Contributed Environmental Management and Assessment to Asia and the Pacific regional countries. Member of Rakhine Crisis Inquiry Commission (RCIC) - 2012, Member of Directors of Myanmar Peace Center (MPC) - 2013–2016. Founder of Environmental guard(e-guard)

Salai Cung Lian Thawng: Graduated in 2001. M.Sc. (AIT). Contributed in various ways to various sectors including Forestry Sector development and Policy Sector Development.
