= Maran Brang Seng =

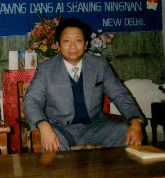
- Born: 16 June 1931; Hpakant, Frontier Areas, British Burma
- Died: 8 August 1994 (aged 63); Kunming, Yunnan, China
- Education: Kachin Baptist School; Rangoon University
- Occupation: Politician
- Known for: Chairman, Kachin Independence Organization (KIO)

Maran Brang Seng (16 June 1931 – 8 August 1994) was a Kachin politician and Chairman of the Kachin Independence Organization (KIO).

== Mr Maran Brang Seng ==
Maran was born in 1930 in Hpakan, Kachin State, Myanmar (Burma), and educated in Kachin Baptist School, Myitkyina. He entered Rangoon University in 1952, and obtained a BA and a BEd in 1955. Brang Seng was Burma's delegate to the YMCA to Singapore in 1957; headmaster of Myitkyina Baptist school 1957–60 and its principal 1961–63. In 1963 he went underground with Kachin Independence Organization. He led the first Kachin rebel delegation to China in 1967 and was Chairman of KIO since 1975. Made peace with the Communist Party of Burma in 1976 and led the delegation of National Democratic Front to the CPB's Panghsang headquarters in March 1986. He left Kachin State in late 1986 to travel abroad. He became vice chairman of Democratic Alliance of Burma on 18 November 1988 and was attached to its headquarters at Manerplaw on the Thai−Burma border until KIO made peace with Rangoon in April 1993. He suffered a stroke on 21 October 1993 in Kunming, Yunnan and died on August 8, 1994.

Chronology of Peace-talks
1st Talk:1980 (Shammed)
2nd Talk:1986 (Shammed)
3rd Talk:1988 (Interrupted by the Democracy Movement).
4th Talk:1994 (Cease-fire agreement was signed, it has been 13 years).

== Maran Brang Seng for Kachin people ==
Maran Brang Seng, the leader among the Kachin people for most of the last thirty years when he died on 8 August 1994, was Chairman of the Kachin Independent Organization Central Committee (KIOCC) and president of Kachin Independent Council (KIC). He had shown great commitment in adhering to the peace-making process.

Kachins always had an ancient homeland. Their ability to integrate and mutually accommodate, both politically and culturally, is age-old. What post-independence Burma denied them was the political self-determination which they had fully enjoyed through World War II.

Lack of self-determination rights led to blocking the progress in Kachin State and the call for reform went out. Brang Seng was one of the leaders of such reform. When the army of the Union of Burma, the Union's presumed protector, turned instead into usurper of citizen's freedom and rights, military engagement became inevitable.
