= Ministry of Environmental Conservation and Forestry (Myanmar) =

- ပတ်ဝန်းကျင်ထိန်းသိမ်းရေးနှင့် သစ်တောရေးရာ ဝန်ကြီးဌာန
- Seal of the Ministry of Environmental Conservation and Forestry

Agency overview
- Formed: 1948
- Preceding agencies: Ministry of Agriculture; Ministry of Forestry and Forests
- Dissolved: March 30, 2016
- Superseding agency: Ministry of Natural Resources and Environmental Conservation
- Jurisdiction: Government of Myanmar
- Headquarters: Naypyidaw; 19.8210144°N 96.1316358°E
- Minister responsible: Khin Maung Yee
- Deputy Minister responsible: Incumbent
- Child agencies: Minister’s Office; Planning and Statistics Department; Forest Department; Dry Zone Greening Department; Myanma Timber Enterprise; Survey Department; Environmental Conservation Department
- Website: www.moecaf.gov.mm

The Ministry of Environmental Conservation and Forestry (Burmese: ပတ်ဝန်းကျင်ထိန်းသိမ်းရေးနှင့် သစ်တောရေးရာ ဝန်ကြီးဌာန) was a ministry in the government of Myanmar responsible for the country's forestry and logging sectors. From 1948 to 5 March 1992, the Ministry was joined with the Ministry of Agriculture and Irrigation as the Ministry of Agriculture and Forests.

The Ministry was organized as Ministry of Natural Resources and Environmental Conservation by combination of Ministry of Mines.

== Organisations ==
The Ministry of Environmental Conservation and Forestry includes the following departments;

- Planning and Statistics Department
- Forest Department
- Dry zone Greening Department
- Environmental Conservation Department
- Survey Department
- Myanma Timber Enterprise

=== Planning and Statistics Department ===
The department is responsible for evaluation and monitoring the implementation of the forest policies, production and work targets, short and long-term planning and the project achievements of the Ministry of Environmental Conservation and Forestry.

The department coordinates with other Department and Enterprise within the Ministry of Environmental Conservation and Forestry on cases such as planning and statistics, international relations, business on wood-based industry, technical assistance from abroad and timber trade. The department is also responsible for evaluating and monitoring the implementation of planned targets of individual organisations under the Ministry to ensure the annual progress of the GDP accordingly. The activities of the department involve promotion of relation with international organisations, provision of assistance in the implementation of the projects by liaisoning with other Ministries, departments and international organisations. The department initiates appropriate regulations, reviews the market situation, observes the Government inputs and reports to the authorities concerned occasionally.

=== Forest Department ===
Since its inception 140 years ago, the Forest Department, in various forms through different areas and systems, has successfully performed its protection and production functions in harmony, based upon a policy of sustainable utilisation of valuable forest resources . While endeavouring to promote the status of the nation's economy, the Forest Department has been meeting the people's basic needs for timber, fuelwood, bamboo and other forest products using the methods of extraction with the least impact on the natural environment.

=== Dry zone Greening Department ===
Dry Zone Greening Department (DZGD) was formed under Ministry of Environmental Conservation and Forestry on 22 July 1997 with specific aim to implement greening of central Dry Zone of Myanmar. Headquarters consists of Director General's office, Admin Division, Planning Division and Engineering Division. Territorial offices include regional director offices, district offices and township offices. Sanctioned strength of the department is a total 3231, including 137 officers and 3094 staffs.

According to new amendment working area of Dry Zone Greening Department includes 3 regions, 12 districts and 54 townships (excluding Gangaw District), covering 20.17 million acres of dry land forests.

=== Environmental Conservation Department ===
The Environmental Conservation Department, one of the six departments under the Ministry of Environmental Conservation and Forestry is responsible for implementing National Environmental Policy, strategy, framework, planning and action plan for the integration of environmental consideration into in the national sustainable development process. And then to manage natural resources conservation and sustainable utilisation, the pollution control on water, air and land for the sustainable environment. And also to co-operate with other government organisations, civil society, private sectors and international organisations concerning with environmental management.

For example, the Myanmar Engineering Society has identified at least 39 locations capable of geothermal power production and some of these hydrothermal reservoirs lie quite close to Yangon which is a significant underutilized resource for power generation to accelerate rural economic development with minimal impact to the environment.

=== Survey Department ===
Survey Department mainly takes responsibilities for topographic mapping throughout the whole country and jointly carries out boundary demarcation works with neighbouring countries.
