= Ministry of Mines (Myanmar) =

- သတ္တုတွင်းဝန်ကြီးဌာန
- The seal of the Ministry of Mines of Myanmar.

Agency overview
- Dissolved: March 30, 2016
- Superseding agency: Ministry of Natural Resources and Environmental Conservation
- Type: Ministry
- Jurisdiction: Government of Burma
- Headquarters: Naypyidaw
- Website: www.mining.gov.mm

The Ministry of Mines (Burmese: သတ္တုတွင်းဝန်ကြီးဌာန; abbreviated MOM) administered Burma's mineral resources extraction, production, and export policies.

The Ministry of Mines was led by Myint Aung, who was appointed by President Thein Sein on 7 September 2012. In 2016, the Ministry was transformed into the Ministry of Natural Resources and Environmental Conservation by combination of Ministry of Environmental Conservation and Forestry.

== See also ==
- Cabinet of Burma
