= Maw sit sit =

Gemstone found in Myanmar

- metamorphic rock
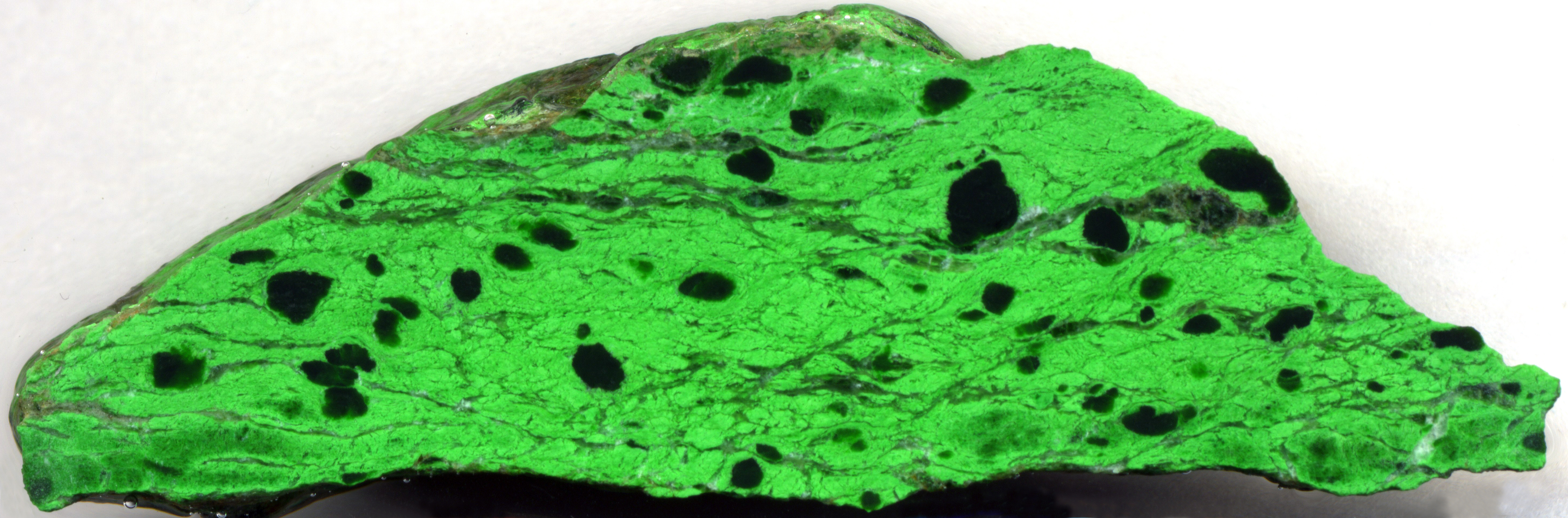

Composition
- kosmochlor, chromium-enriched jadeite, albite feldspar

Maw sit sit, also known as jade-albite, is a gemstone found exclusively in northern Myanmar. It was first identified in 1963 by the late Swiss gemologist Edward Gubelin and was named after the village close to where it was first found in the foothills of the Himalayas.

Typically maw sit sit is green with distinctive dark-green to black veins. Maw sit sit is technically a rock rather than a mineral. It is composed of several different minerals, including kosmochlor (also known as ureyite), varying amounts of chromium-enriched jadeite, and albite feldspar.

Maw sit sit can have a refractive index ranging from 1.52-1.68, and a hardness rating of 6 to 7 on the Mohs scale. Maw sit sit has a specific gravity ranging from 2.45 to 3.15. Clarity found within maw-sit-sit is typically translucent to opaque.
