= July 2019 Hpakant jade mine collapse =

2019 Hpakant jade mine landslide
- Date: 28 July 2019
- Location: Hpakant, Kachin State, Myanmar; 25°36′46″N 98°18′41″W
- Deaths: 17+
- Missing: Unknown

In the early morning of July 28, 2019, a landslide in a Hpakant jade mine killed at least 17 people, leaving others missing and two injured. The people killed were workers from Yarzahtarni Jade Mining Company, local police, and others unaffiliated with the mine.

== Landslide ==
Because of Myanmar's monsoon season, the government had previously ordered all mines in Hpakant to cease operation. However, several of the workers from Yarzahtarni Jade company were still sleeping in tents below the mine. According to local residents, there were also still people looking through the tailings of the mine, trying to find jade discarded by the miners. To prevent illegal mine activity, the government had stationed police officers at the mine. The policemen were also sleeping in tents below the mine, near the workers.

According to the local police, the area had experienced a lot of heavy rain in the week leading up to the collapse. Shortly after midnight on July 28, a landslide occurred, and at approximately 2:20 am MMT, the mine collapsed onto the workers and police sleeping below.

== Rescue and recovery ==
Two policemen were injured and required hospital attention. Initially, the bodies of 14 miners were recovered after the collapse, including the body of one police officer. Later in the day, the total dead was updated to 17, with the death and missing tolls still expected to rise.

Rescue efforts were organized by Myanmar police, who were assisted by the Thinkhar Philanthropic Society, a charity organization.

== Response ==
State Minister for Natural Resources and Environmental Conservation U La Sai ordered signs to be placed by the mining companies, warning that landslides could occur, and for local government to inspect the mines and make sure that they followed all safety precautions. According to Hpakant Director Kyaw Swa Aung, the workers had been in the mine to protect it at the instruction of the mine owners.
