= Eduard Gübelin =

Swiss jeweler, gemologist (1913–2005)

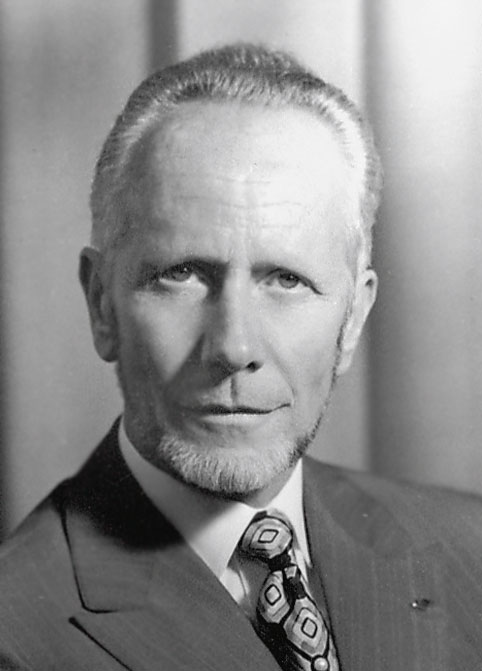
- Eduard Josef Gübelin.
- Born: Eduard Josef Gübelin; 16 March 1913; Lucerne, Switzerland
- Died: 15 March 2005 (aged 91)

Eduard Josef Gübelin (1913 – 2005), also known as Edward Joseph Gübelin was a Swiss gemstone researcher.

Gübelin's studies on gemstone inclusions laid the groundwork for the microscopic identification of gemstones. Gübelin used poetry to validate gemstones, as noted in the book Emeralds A Passionate Guide.

Gubelin was one of the first gemologists to recognise the butterfly wing effect in Colombian emeralds.

He also founded Gübelin Gem Lab.

== Biography ==
Gübelin was born on 16 March 1913 to Eduard Moritz Gübelin and Maria Gübelin (née Schriber) to a watch-making family. In 1923, his father established a gemological lab to support the jewelry part of the business. In 1932, he joined the family business at the age of 19.

He majored in mineralogy at the University of Zurich, whilst also studying art, history, literature and ancient languages. During the winter term in 1936–1937, he studied at the Institute of Precious Stones in Vienna under Hermann Michel, his father's tutor. He went on to complete his doctoral dissertation in 1938 at the University of Zurich, with the diploma awarded in 1941.

In 1939, he assumed leadership of the gemological lab that his father had established, which would later become the Gübelin Gem Lab.

Gübelin is considered one of the pioneers of modern gemology.
