= Ministry of Natural Resources and Environmental Conservation =

Government ministry of Myanmar

- သယံဇာတနှင့်သဘာဝပတ်ဝန်းကျင်ထိန်းသိမ်းရေး ဝန်ကြီးဌာန

Agency overview
- Formed: 30 March 2016
- Preceding agencies: Ministry of Mines; Ministry of Environmental Conservation
- Jurisdiction: Government of Myanmar
- Headquarters: Naypyidaw
- Agency executive: Khin Maung Yee, Union Minister
- Website: www.monrec.gov.mm

The Ministry of Natural Resources and Environmental Conservation (Burmese: သယံဇာတနှင့်သဘာဝပတ်ဝန်းကျင်ထိန်းသိမ်းရေး ဝန်ကြီးဌာန; MONREC) is a Myanmar government ministry, founded by the merger of the Ministry of Mines and the Ministry of Environmental Conservation and Forestry by then-president Htin Kyaw in 2016.

As of 2023, Myanmar possesses ten captive white elephants, which are in the custody of the Ministry's Forest Department. They are kept in inhumane conditions, instead of being allowed to roam, they are shackled for 22 hours a day and housed in small open-air pavilions.

== Departments ==
- Union Minister Office
- Forest Department
- Dry Zone Greening Department
- Environmental Conservation Department
- Survey Department
- Myanma Timber Enterprise
- University of Forestry and Environmental Science
- Department of Mines
- Department of Geological Survey and Mineral Exploration
- No. 1 Mining Enterprise
- No. 2 Mining Enterprise
- Myanma Gems Enterprise
- Myanma Pearl Enterprise
