= Moonscape =

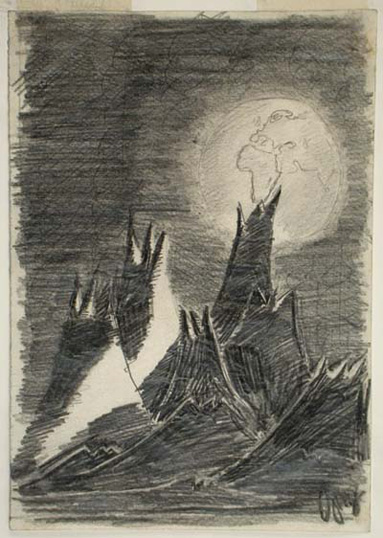
An example of a moonscape, by Petr Ginz.

A moonscape is an area or vista of the lunar landscape (generally of the Earth's moon), or a visual representation of this, such as in a painting. The term "moonscape" is also sometimes used metaphorically for an area devastated or flattened by war, often by shelling.

Moonscapes have been a popular subject in art and literature since the technology to observe the Moon surfaced, appearing in work such as a sketch drawn by Petr Ginz. It is currently residing in the Yad Vashem Museum Special Exhibit in Honor of Israeli Astronaut Col. Ilan Ramon.

In literature, the term appears most often over the last century in reference to cities damaged by ballistics, particularly when applied to post-WWII Berlin, as in David L. Robbins' The End of War, where he describes the city as a "moonscape of desolation".
