= April 2019 Hpakant jade mine collapse =

Fatal incident in Kachin State, Myanmar

2019 Hpakant jade mine collapse
- Date: 22 April 2019
- Location: Maw Wun Kalay, Hpakant, Kachin State, Myanmar; 25°37′30″N 96°16′48″E
- Deaths: 6 (including two rescue workers)
- Missing: 50+

On 22 April 2019, a landslide triggered the collapse of a jade mine near Maw Wun Kalay, Hpakant, Kachin State, Myanmar, trapping at least 54 miners. The deaths of four miners were confirmed, along with the later deaths of two rescue workers. The remaining miners were presumed to have died.

== Collapse ==
At 23:30 MMT, a mud-filled pond at a jade mine in Hpakant collapsed. The mud and tailings in the pond buried miners below it in up to 30.5 metres of mud. At the time, the miners were asleep in their residences, which were located below the mine. The miners belonged to two different companies: Myanmar Thura and Shwe Nagar Koe Kaung, while the mine was operated by Unity Co. A photo taken some time before the mine collapse and posted on Facebook showed a large pool of water being formed above the miners, while the Myanmar Thura company mined against the earth under the water.

== Rescue efforts ==
Rescue efforts were started on 23 April, the morning after the collapse. The efforts were coordinated by the local government and welfare organizations. According to Tin Soe, a politician representing the area, removing the mud "could cost millions of dollars." He also said that "they [the miners buried under the landslide] won’t survive. It is not possible because they are buried under mud." Four bodies were recovered. The search for more miners was cancelled on 26 April, after another landslide killed two of the rescue workers.

== Reactions ==
In response to the collapse, the acting UN Resident Coordinator to Myanmar called on the country to implement new safety legislation to protect mine workers. The natural resource minister of Kachin said that he would take action against the mining companies involved in the incident, and said that he wanted mining companies to work to improve the safety of their mines. Following the collapse, the Lonekhin Jade Office carried out a survey on the safety of other jade mines in the region, reporting to the Myanmar government that other mining blocks in the area were also dangerous. In response, the Myanmar central government suspended operations in seventeen mine blocks in Hapakant, affecting eleven companies. None of the companies the miners worked for or who operated the mine were shut down or found at fault by the Myanmar government. The Myanma Gems Enterprise instead blamed the collapse on "the instability of the earth." Some of the families of the miners were compensated, with one family receiving approximately $30,000USD, more than the average compensation for the victims of other industrial accidents in Hpakant.

Reporters from Frontier Myanmar said that their investigation found that the collapse was preventable, and blamed it on policy failures under the current National League for Democracy and previous governments. All three of Myanmar Thura's mining licenses had expired in 2017, and the company had never been licensed to work in this mine.

In May 2019, the government issued a three month ban on mining in Hpakant, to prevent a collapse during the monsoon season.

== See also ==
- Jade trade in Myanmar
