= Myanma Timber Enterprise =

State-owned timber company

- Native name: မြန်မာ့သစ်လုပ်ငန်း
- Formerly: State Timber Board (STB); Timber Corporation (TC)
- Company type: Public
- Industry: Wood industry
- Founded: 1948; 78 years ago
- Headquarters: Yangon, Myanmar
- Products: Timber
- Owner: Myanmar Government
- Parent: Ministry of Natural Resources and Environmental Conservation
- Website: www.mte.com.mm

Myanma Timber Enterprise (Burmese: မြန်မာ့သစ်လုပ်ငန်း; abbreviated MTE) is the national timber company of Myanmar. It operates under the supervision of the Ministry of Natural Resources and Environmental Conservation. Founded in 1948 as the State Timber Board, MTE is a state-owned monopoly that regulates the harvest and sale of timber in the country, drawing a percentage of the country's total timber export revenue. Myanmar's forest product regulations deem only wood under the control of the MTE to be legal. The MTE has been accused of corruption, specifically of accepting bribes and subcontracting to allow illegal export of mislabeled or illegally logged wood, in violation of both Myanmar law and laws on timber import in the European Union and the US.

== History ==
The State Timber Board was founded in 1948, after Burma achieved independence. It was renamed the Timber Corporation in 1974, and again renamed the Myanma Timber Enterprise in 1989, after the 8888 Uprising.

In the aftermath of the 2021 Myanmar coup d'état, the United States, European Union, Canada, Switzerland, and the United Kingdom banned MTE for its role in generating revenue for the military regime in April 2021. These countries continue to import teak from Myanmar, evading sanctions by using illegal private brokers or intermediaries to acquire Burmese teak, importing a total of $37 million in teak between February and November 2021.

== See also ==
- Deforestation in Myanmar
