= 2023 Hpakant jade mine disaster =

Landslide in Myanmar

Coordinates: 25°36′N 96°16′E

The 2023 Hpakant jade mine disaster occurred on 13 August 2023, when the Hpakant Jade Mines experienced the third documented landslide in the area. Hpakant is located in Kachin, Myanmar. The landslide killed 32 people when tailings (mining waste) swept the miners into a nearby lake. Myanmar is considered the sodium alumina silicate (jade) capital of the world because it has the highest concentration of jade. Hpakant provides 70% of the world's jade. It is estimated that Myanmar's jade industry is worth more than 31 billion dollars annually, about half of its GDP. Despite the 1974 Nationalisation of Industry Act, most of Myanmar's jade is sold illegally. Chinese companies work with the military to create untraceable Chinese-owned shell companies like Wai Kharmine. Myanmar's jade industry is contentious because it degrades the environment and endangers miners, while supporting political turmoil by financially aiding the military junta (Tatmadaw) and ethnic militias.

Since its independence from the British in 1948, Myanmar has been in an almost constant state of civil war. In 2021, the Tatmadaw overthrew the democratic system. However, the Tatmadaw is not the singular ruling body. There are several rival ethnic military states such as Kachin's Kachin Independence Army (KIA). These groups have created their own governing systems. There are also ousted democratic groups such as the National Democracy League (NDL), seeking to regain control. During the NDL's rule, Myanmar signed a Global Trans Initiative to encourage a more transparent system and temporarily "closed" jade mine licenses in 2016.

Currently, the KIA and Tatmadaw enforce their own taxes, corruption system, and control over the jade-filled mountains. Because of corruption, Myanmar is losing 80–90% of potential public funding that could be generated from the billion-dollar jade industry. The continuous coups have prevented Myanmar from developing infrastructure systems that serve all citizens. The Tatmadaw, militias, Chinese, and drug dealers function as one economic mechanism that uses Hkapant's 300,000 jade miners to further their political and financial gains.

The Tatmadaw and KIA monitor the jade industry and movement around Hkapant via checkpoints. They forbid foreigners from entering Hkapant, but "allow" known drug dealers and Chinese traders to enter. Drug dealers work with the different ruling factions to create a vicious circle that consists of jade miners working long days, being paid little, and using their income to buy drugs like heroin. Drug use, prostitution, and unsafe living circumstances have led to the increase in HIV and Hepatitis C.

Myanmar's governing systems view jade miners as disposable and not worthy of protection. The ruling factions stay in power by economically harnessing China's voracious demand for jade. They avoid creating safeguards for miners because safeguards would empower workers but decrease jade production and the government's potential profits. As long as the Tatmadaw and militia keep whistleblowers away from Hpakant, there will be no regulations to safeguard jade miners. The lack of regulations will allow for an increase in mudslides and environmental disasters from jade mining. These disasters will lead to an increase in poverty, HIV, environmental desecration, and premature deaths.

== Physical and environmental impact ==
The extraction of natural minerals, including gold, lithium, and jade, has been associated with adverse environmental impacts. These mining activities give rise to various hazards — prominently among them being land subsidence and landslides, as observed in the Hpakant Jade mines, notably in August 2023, and in prior occurrences during 2020 and 2021.

The repercussions of these landslides are extensive — affecting both the natural environment and human lives significantly. Primarily, recent landslides have resulted in the tragic loss of miners' lives. In 2020, the landslide disaster claimed over 175 lives. The recent 2023 Hpakant landslides led to over 30 fatalities, primarily among the breadwinners of families, resulting in substantial economic setbacks. Consequently, the nation experiences a depletion of human capital — incurring long-term economic ramifications. Additionally, survivors often endure injuries and physical deformities, such as spinal injuries, leading to paralysis, and amputations, imposing enduring challenges on their quality of life. These circumstances not only burden affected families but also lead to a loss of vital workforce for the government, further amplifying economic repercussions.

Furthermore, the jade mining activities and resultant landslide disasters contribute to deforestation and the obliteration of natural habitats. The disasters dismantle the dwelling places of organisms, forcing some to flee and causing fatalities due to landslides, resulting in a loss of biodiversity. Moreover, landslides extensively induce soil erosion, depleting natural and topsoil, rendering land infertile for agricultural purposes. The disintegration of mountains, which function as natural habitats and water sources, inflicts severe damage on the natural environment.

An undeniable environmental consequence of landslides is pollution, evident in the contamination of water bodies in the Hpakant community due to mining-related chemical discharges. This pollution introduces health risks to consumers, affecting aquatic life with detrimental effects on fish and other organisms. Air pollution is another consequence, depleting air quality in the Hpakant community, leading to respiratory diseases and contributing to an increase in noncommunicable diseases, such as cancers and chronic obstructive pulmonary disease in Myanmar.

== Health implications ==
Besides being famous for jade, Myanmar is also the world's second largest producer of opium and mining sites such as those in Hpakant are known to be the epicentre for drug use. While there's limited statistics on percentage of drug use among those working at jade mines, it is estimated that 72% of new HIV infections are due to contamination from intravenous needles used for drugs. Furthermore, the state of Kachin has the highest prevalence of HIV at 2.8% compared to a national rate of 0.57%. Miners have reported that it is common to find drug camps — also known as "shooting galleries" — set up around mining sites where they can buy and use drugs publicly.

During the day, miners inject themselves with a concoction of methamphetamine and caffeine (known locally as "yaba") to help them cope with the harsh environment and long hours of laborious work searching for lumps of jade. At night, they use heroin to relieve pain, relax, or fall asleep.

The use of drugs has serious health implications on these jade miners. The initial use of yaba gives jade miners an energy boost but after the influence of drugs wear off, they may experience prolonged sleep and depression. The physical effects of using yaba include dental problems, seizures, aggression, mental health problems, and heart failure resulting in death. Research has also shown that chronic use of methamphetamine can alter one's state of mind — affecting thoughts, emotions, and behaviours to the point where sense of reality is lost.

While yaba is a stimulant that give jade miners the energy they need to scavenge for precious stones, heroin is used as a depressant to help them relax, manage pain, and sleep after hard work. Using heroin through needles increases risk of transmission of communicable diseases like HIV, Hepatitis B, and C. Drug users who have been diagnosed as HIV positive or having other diseases have also experienced stigmatisation from their community — increasing their vulnerability to physical violence, anxiety, and depression.

== Incident response ==
=== Emergency team response ===
The rescue was led by a local response team who searched the man-made lake — a product of the excessive mining — since the landslide carried miners down into the body of water. The rescue operations are often delayed or suspended due to downpours that occur in the rainy season and these heavy rains are what often trigger the emergency event in conjunction with bad mining practices. At the time of this incident, divers were unable to enter the lake and could only hang hooks from the motorboats to drag the water for remains as soil, rocks, and waste continued to spill down nearby cliffs. This effort was undertaken by 150 rescuers and five small boats.

=== Government response ===
The Tatmadaw's spokesperson told reporters that only 10 people were reported missing or injured, and that government authorities were providing assistance where possible. These numbers do not align with earlier reports that were coming out of the region.

The local NDL member of parliament for Hpkant stated that landslides in the township were caused by the permeation of rainwater during monsoon season, as opposed to tailing dams left behind by mining companies and slope failures.

In past landslide events, the government blamed unemployment for the tragedies or greedy miners who ignored official advice. Currently, the Myanmar government does not conduct routine investigations to determine the cause of repeat landslides, it does not have effective gemstone or mining regulations, and it allows for armed groups to operate within the extractive sectors.

=== Mining company response ===
Most mining companies do not comment on research studies that prove that aggressive mining cycles, tailing dams and poor mine designs have led to landslides, wall collapses and deaths. Between 2015 and 2020, there were 17 incidents of tailing dams or slope failures in the Hpkant area, all of which resulted in approximately 630 deaths. There are more than 500 companies using heavy mining machinery in Hpkant, making it difficult to pinpoint responsible figures for each event. There is no official comment from mining companies regarding these incidents.

== Drug incident response ==
=== International organisation response ===
Since 1996, Medecins du Monde (MdM) has provided services targeted at reducing HIV transmission among people who inject drugs in the Kachin state. As of 2019, in conjunction with other aid organisations, MdM has managed to distribute over 20 million sterile syringes within Kachin. In addition to clean needles and syringes, MdM also has drop-in centres that provide HIV counselling, testing, and therapies.

=== Social group response ===
In 2014, a Christian group called Pat Jasan developed in Kachin with the objective of eradicating illegal drug production and consumption. Members of Pat Jasan carry out drug raids that involve body searches, capturing and detaining people, and destroying properties. Their efforts to rehabilitate individuals and curb drug proliferation are highly controversial as it often results in physical violence and harm but does produce some results in the face of government inaction.

== Emerging lessons ==
The conflict between KIA and Tatmadaw has impoverished the population — forcing them to rely on illegal jade mining as their income source. Establishing and maintaining a cease fire between the government and regional ethnic groups will create peace for the region's stability, allowing local businesses to thrive, stimulating local economy and improving the population's lifestyle.

With many miners relying on illicit drugs to work and survive, many develop an unhealthy addiction, accelerated by cheap and easily accessible drugs in the region. Drug rehabilitation programmes and public education in conjunction with local leaders' support to pinpoint effective measures to combat drug addiction within the community would lead to a sustainable reduction in drug consumption. Reducing drug availability under strict government regulations reduces the hazards of illegal jade mining.

Sufficient government oversight and enforcement over jade would provide useful groundwork for a thriving regulated jade market which increases protection for miners and beneficiaries alike, with support from well-funded and trained government departments for a smooth and seamless operation. Greater transparency of the government's ties to the military junta, Chinese companies and other major stakeholders can be established from transparent and in-depth reporting of these mining companies. Stringent regulations on jade mining and sales supported by effective enforcement and judicial services are an effective tool to reduce the likelihood of corruption.

Local mining companies are often proxies for Chinese firms that cannot legally own mines, with Chinese firms creating joint ventures to circumvent the law prohibiting foreigners from investing in jade mining. The business structures of these organisations are opaque, making accountability with its leadership and stakeholders difficult. With most jade demand originating from China, assistance from Chinese officials is beneficial to enforce strict regulations over illegally mined jade, mandating the declaration of the jade's origins, and confiscating any jade mined illegally from Myanmar.

In 2021, the United States of America, United Kingdom, and Canada re-established economic sanctions and the prohibition on Myanmar jade imports and associated companies. These sanctions have prevented individuals and corporations from performing financial transactions with the Myanmar state-owned enterprise overseeing all gemstone activities in Myanmar. The sanctions led to a decrease of the operations of illegal jade mining and were effective in disincentivising others from dealing with illegal jade.
