= 2015 Hpakant jade mine disaster =

2015 landslide in northern Myanmar

Coordinates: 25.6168°N 96.2902°E

Hpakant jade mine disaster
- Hpakant jade mine (Myanmar)
- Date: 21 November 2015
- Location: Hpakant, Kachin State, Myanmar
- Deaths: 116
- Injuries: N/A
- Missing: 100

On 21 November 2015, a major landslide in Hpakant, Kachin State, northern Myanmar killed at least 116 people near a jade mine, with around 100 more missing.

== Landslide ==
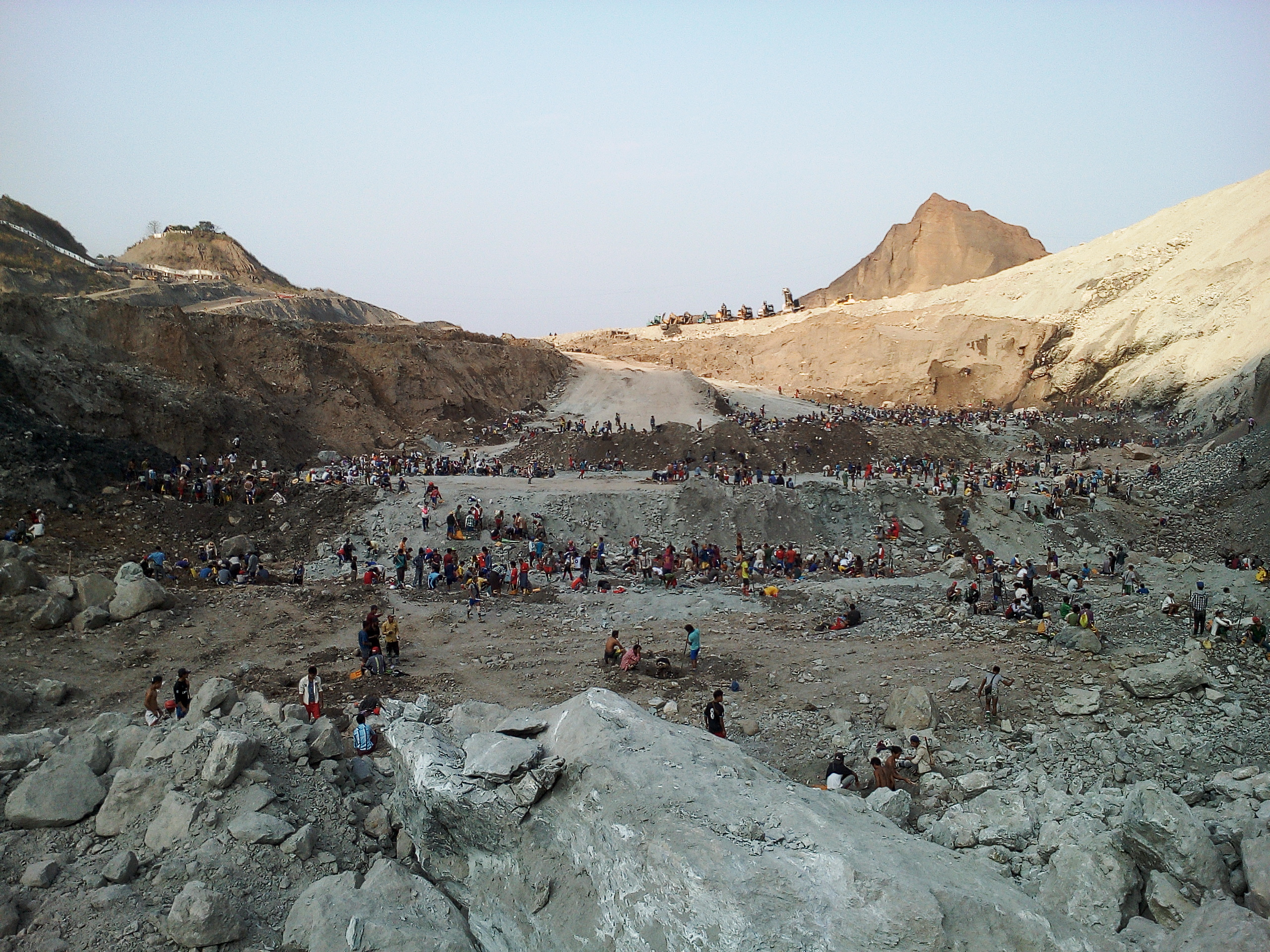
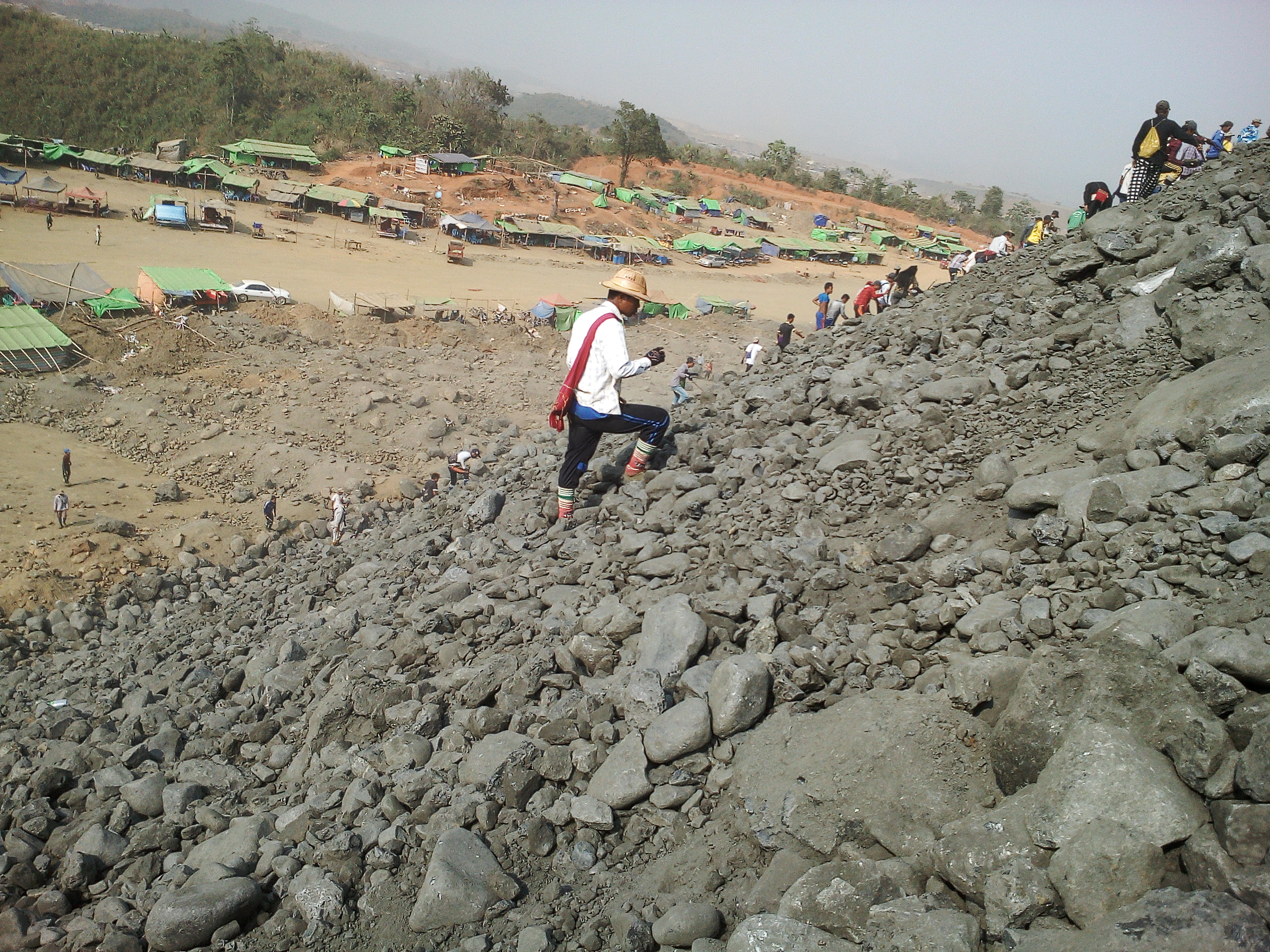
Hpakant jade mine in 2018

The landslide occurred in the early morning hours, when a man-made heap of waste soil from the nearby jade mine collapsed. Many of those killed were people living in a small village near the waste heap, including both miners and those who scavenged through the waste soil looking for jade remnants to sell. The cause of the collapse is not known.

Rescue efforts by the Myanmar Red Cross and other groups were made to find and recover survivors; one person was pulled alive from the rubble, but subsequently died from injuries. At least 116 bodies were reportedly recovered and around 100 people were reported missing. The total number of casualties could not be accurately estimated, as the precise number of people who lived near the site was not known. According to a Hpakant Township General Administration Department official, people had been warned to avoid living near the waste heap because of risk of landslides.

== Investigation ==
The jade industry in Myanmar generates estimated annual revenues of US$31 billion. It is presently unclear which companies are responsible for the waste dump, although it is known that prior to the 2015 democratic election, many of these were controlled by the military leadership of the country, leading to questionable safety practices and corruption. Deaths from similar landslides are common, but none have matched the scale of the Hpakant landslide. A spokesman for the National League for Democracy party said they will investigate the companies and the practices that led to this disaster.

== See also ==
- 2015 Myanmar floods
