= Myanma Gems Enterprise =

State-owned gems company

- Native name: မြန်မာ့ကျောက်မျက်ရတနာ ရောင်းဝယ်ရေး လုပ်ငန်း
- Formerly: Burma Gems Corporation
- Company type: Public
- Industry: Gemstones
- Founded: 1976; 50 years ago
- Headquarters: Myanmar
- Products: Gemstones; Jade; Rubies
- Owner: Myanmar Government
- Parent: Ministry of Natural Resources and Environmental Conservation
- Website: www.mge.gov.mm

Myanma Gems Enterprise (Burmese: မြန်မာ့ကျောက်မျက်ရတနာ ရောင်းဝယ်ရေး လုပ်ငန်း; abbreviated MGE) is a state-owned enterprise of Myanmar, operating under the Ministry of Natural Resources and Environmental Conservation. MGE manages the mining, marketing, and sales of Burmese jade and gemstones, and administers gemstone regulations and licensing, participates in joint ventures for mining operations, and collects royalties. MGE organises biannual gem emporiums for extracted jade and gemstones. MGE generates approximately half of the Burmese government's annual revenue.

== History ==
Gemstone mining was nationalised in Burma following the 1962 Burmese coup d'état. In 1976, the Burma Gems Corporation was established to mine and market gemstones. It was renamed the Myanma Gems Enterprise in 1989, after the 8888 Uprising.

Following the 2015 Myanmar general election, which was won by National League for Democracy, the military-owned Myanma Economic Holdings Limited quickly secured 58% of MGE's jade and gemstone mining licence, becoming the country's largest licence holder.

In the aftermath of the 2021 Myanmar coup d'état, the United States, European Union, and the United Kingdom banned MGE for its role in generating revenue for the military regime.
