= 2016 Myanmar presidential election =

- 15 March 2016

652 members of the Electoral College 327 electoral votes needed to win
- Turnout: 652 (99.23%)
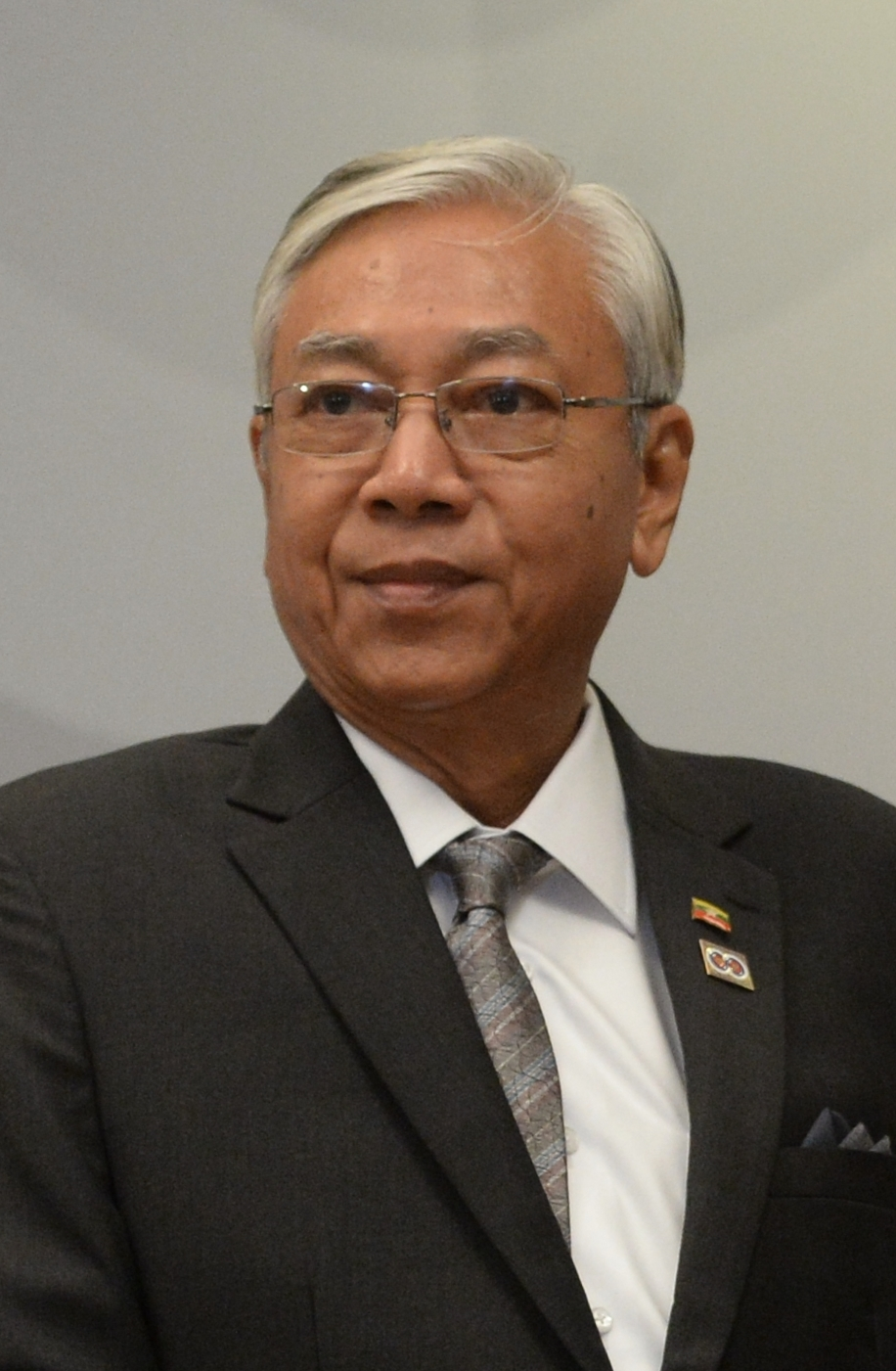

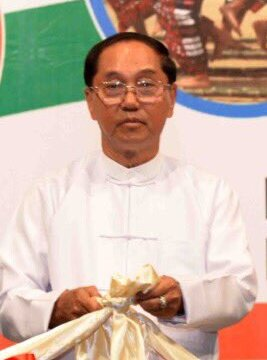

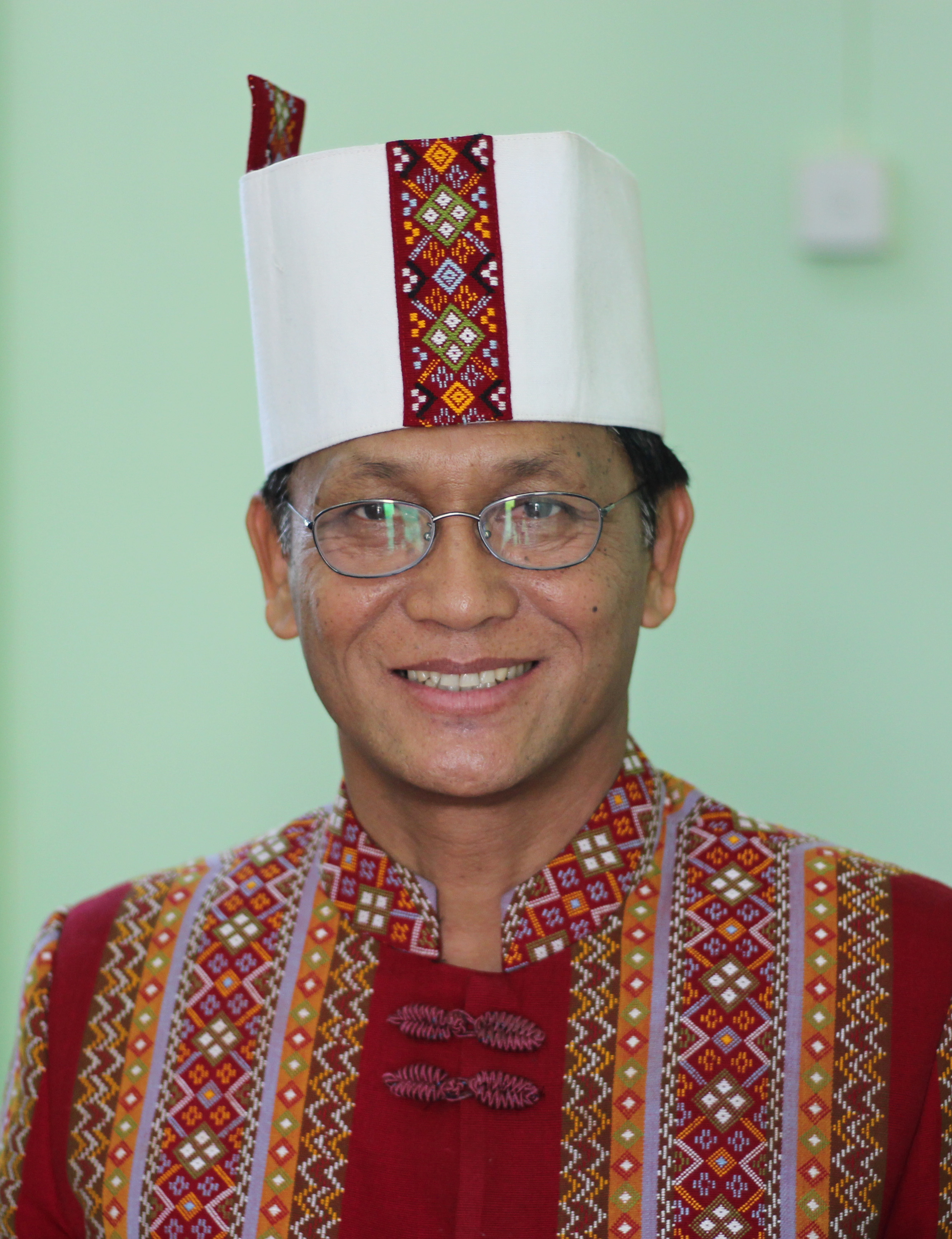
| Nominee | Htin Kyaw | Myint Swe | Henry Van Thio |
| Party | NLD | USDP | NLD |
| Electoral vote | 360 | 213 | 79 |
| Percentage | 55.21% | 32.67% | 12.12% |
| Committee | Pyithu Hluttaw | Tatmadaw | Amyotha Hluttaw |
President before election
Thein Sein
USDP
Elected President
Htin Kyaw
NLD
Vice Presidents before election
Sai Mauk Kham (First)
USDP
Nyan Tun (Second)
USDP
Elected Vice Presidents
Myint Swe (First)
USDP
Henry Van Thio (Second)
NLD

Indirect presidential elections were held in Myanmar on 15 March 2016, after the 2015 general election. Members of the Assembly of the Union voted for the country's President, and two Vice-Presidents.

The elections were the second presidential elections held under the 2008 constitution.

Htin Kyaw, Myint Swe, and Henry Van Thio were elected President, First Vice-President, and Second-Vice President respectively.

== Background ==
Myanmar, previously known as Burma, has been under a dictatorship for the majority of its independent history. First, under Ne Win and his Burma Socialist Programme Party, and then under a military junta. In 2007, large scale demonstrations took place during the Saffron Revolution, which was organized by the vast monastic community of Myanmar. The revolution was suppressed, but lead to political reforms and the 2008 constitution.

In the yearly 2010s, Myanmar transitioned into a state of semi-democracy, finally culminating in the 2015 elections, where democracy leader Daw Aung San Suu Kyi became State Counsellor, and her party the National League for Democracy won a landslide victory. This put the party in a very powerful position ahead of the presidential elections.

== Electoral system ==
Under the 2008 constitution, Myanmar has a President, and two Vice-Presidents. They are elected by the Pyidaungsu Hluttaw, the national legislature.

The Pyidaungsu Hluttaw consists of two chambers, Pyithu Hluttaw, and Amyotha Hluttaw. Most seats are directly elected, but a quarter of the seats in both chambers are appointed by the Tatmadaw.

| Chamber | Type | MPs |
|---|---|---|
| Pyithu Hluttaw | Directly-elected | 330 |
| Pyithu Hluttaw | Military-appointed | 110 |
| Amyotha Hluttaw | Directly-elected | 168 |
| Amyotha Hluttaw | Military-appointed | 56 |

The Presidential Electoral College is made up of three committees:

- The directly elected MPs from Pyithu Hluttaw (330).
- The directly elected MPs from Amyotha Hluttaw (168).
- The military appointees in both chambers (166).

Each committee nominates a single candidate. The whole Pyidaungsu Hluttaw then votes, with all three nominees on the ballot together and each of the 664 MPs being entitled to one vote. The vote is a secret ballot. The candidate that receives the highest number of votes is President, the candidate with the second highest number of votes is 1st Vice-President, and the remaining candidate is 2nd Vice-President. This system guarantees the military at least one Vice-President.

== Candidates ==
The candidates were nominated on 11 March 2016.

=== Pyithu Hluttaw committee ===
Htin Kyaw was nominated by the committee from Pyithu Hluttaw. He was not a member of parliament. Sai Mauk Kham, incumbent 1st Vice-President, was nominated by the USDP. Thein Sein, the committee nominee in the 2011 election did not run for re-election.

| Candidate | Party | Votes | % |
|---|---|---|---|
| Htin Kyaw | National League for Democracy | 274 | 90.43 |
| Sai Mauk Kham (incumbent) | Union Solidarity and Development Party | 29 | 9.57 |
| Total | | 303 | 100.00 |
| Valid votes | | 303 | 95.58 |
| Invalid/blank votes | | 14 | 4.42 |
| Total votes | | 317 | 100.00 |
| Registered voters/turnout | | 323 | 98.14 |
Source: The Irrawdday

Seven Pyithu Hluttaw seats were vacant.

=== Amyotha Hluttaw committee ===
Henry Van Thio was nominated by the committee from Amyotha Hluttaw. He was a member of that house from the Chin State's 3rd constituency. The USDP nominated former Speaker of the Amyotha Hluttaw Khin Aung Myint, who was a member of that house from Mandalay's 8th constituency. He had also served as Minister of Culture under the junta. Sai Mauk Kham, the committee's nominee in the previous election was instead nominated by the Pyithu Hluttaw.

| Candidate | Party | Votes | % |
|---|---|---|---|
| Henry Van Thio | National League for Democracy | 148 | 91.93 |
| Khin Aung Myint | Union Solidarity and Development Party | 13 | 8.07 |
| Total | | 161 | 100.00 |
| Valid votes | | 161 | 96.41 |
| Invalid/blank votes | | 6 | 3.59 |
| Total votes | | 167 | 100.00 |
| Registered voters/turnout | | 168 | 99.40 |
Source: The Irrawdday

=== Military committee ===
Myint Swe was nominated by the committee of military appointed members. He was Chief Minister of the Yangon Region. He is a member of the USDP. Nyan Tun, incumbent 2nd Vice-President who was nominated by the Tatmadaw committee in the 2012 by-election did not run for re-election.

| Candidate | Party | Votes | % |
|---|---|---|---|
| Myint Swe | Union Solidarity and Development Party | 166 | 100.00 |
| Total | | 166 | 100.00 |
| Total votes | | 166 | – |
| Registered voters/turnout | | 166 | 100.00 |
Source: The Irrawdday

== Results ==
The election was held on 15 March 2016.

| Candidate | Party | Votes | % |
|---|---|---|---|
| Htin Kyaw (elected president) | National League for Democracy | 360 | 55.21 |
| Myint Swe (elected first vice-president) | Union Solidarity and Development Party | 213 | 32.67 |
| Henry Van Thio (elected second vice-president) | National League for Democracy | 79 | 12.12 |
| Total | | 652 | 100.00 |
| Registered voters/turnout | | 657 | – |
Source: The Irrawdday

Seven Pyithu Hluttaw seats were vacant.

The elected candidates were sworn in on 30 March 2016.

== 2018 by-election ==
A by-election was held for president in 2018.
