= 2026 Myanmar presidential election =

- 3 April 2026

586 members of the Electoral College 294 electoral votes needed to win
- Turnout: 584 (99.66%)
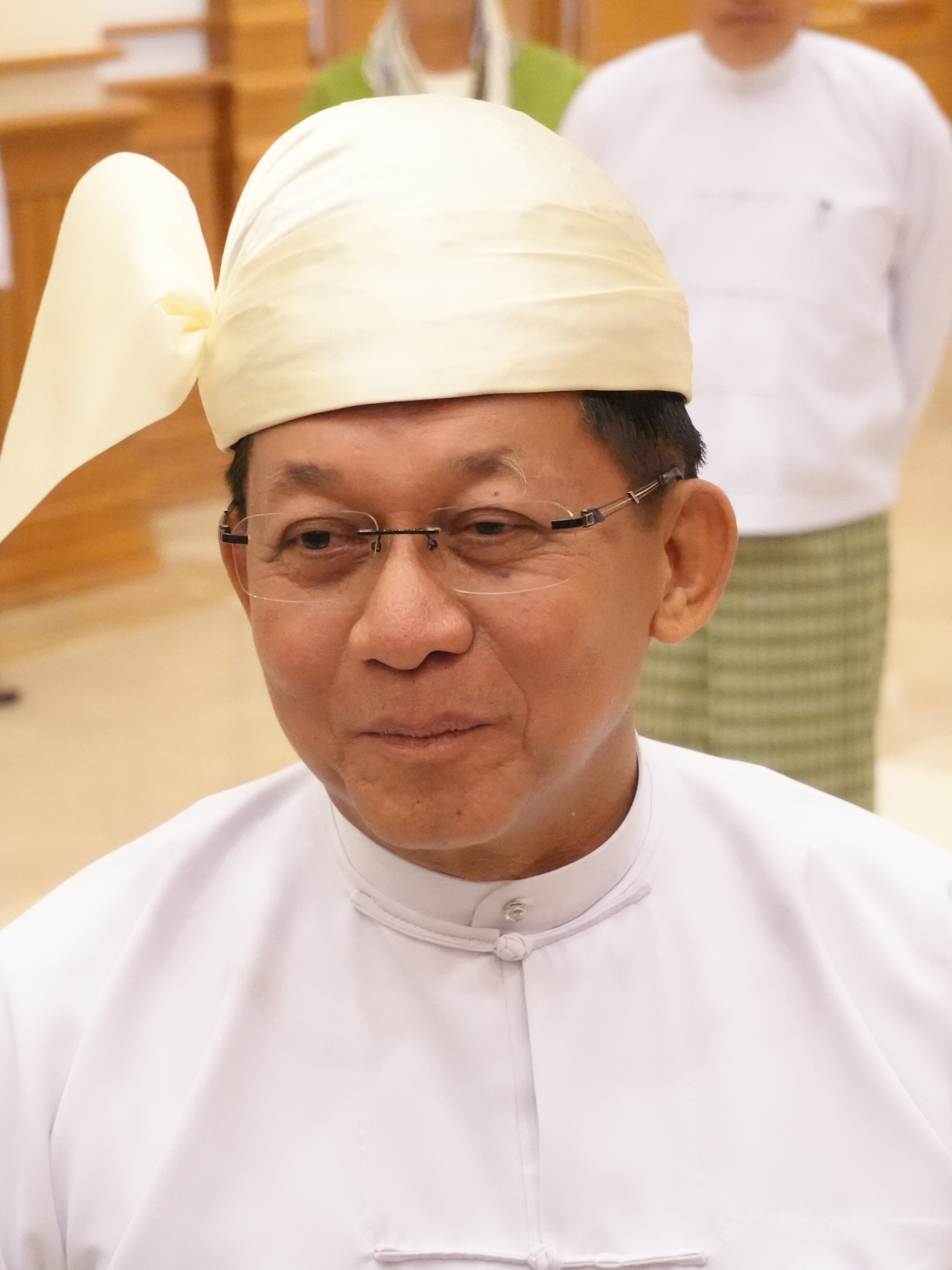

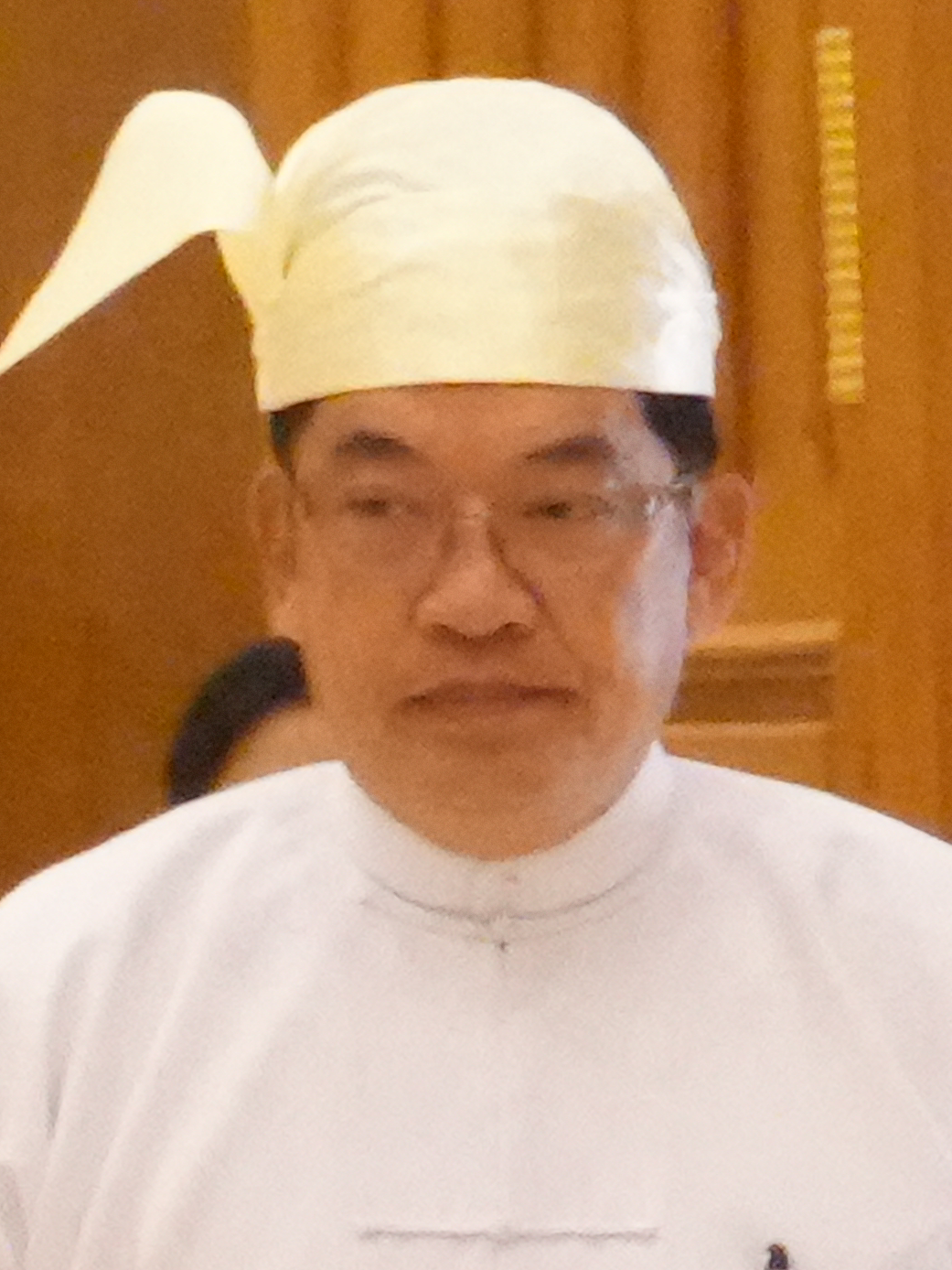

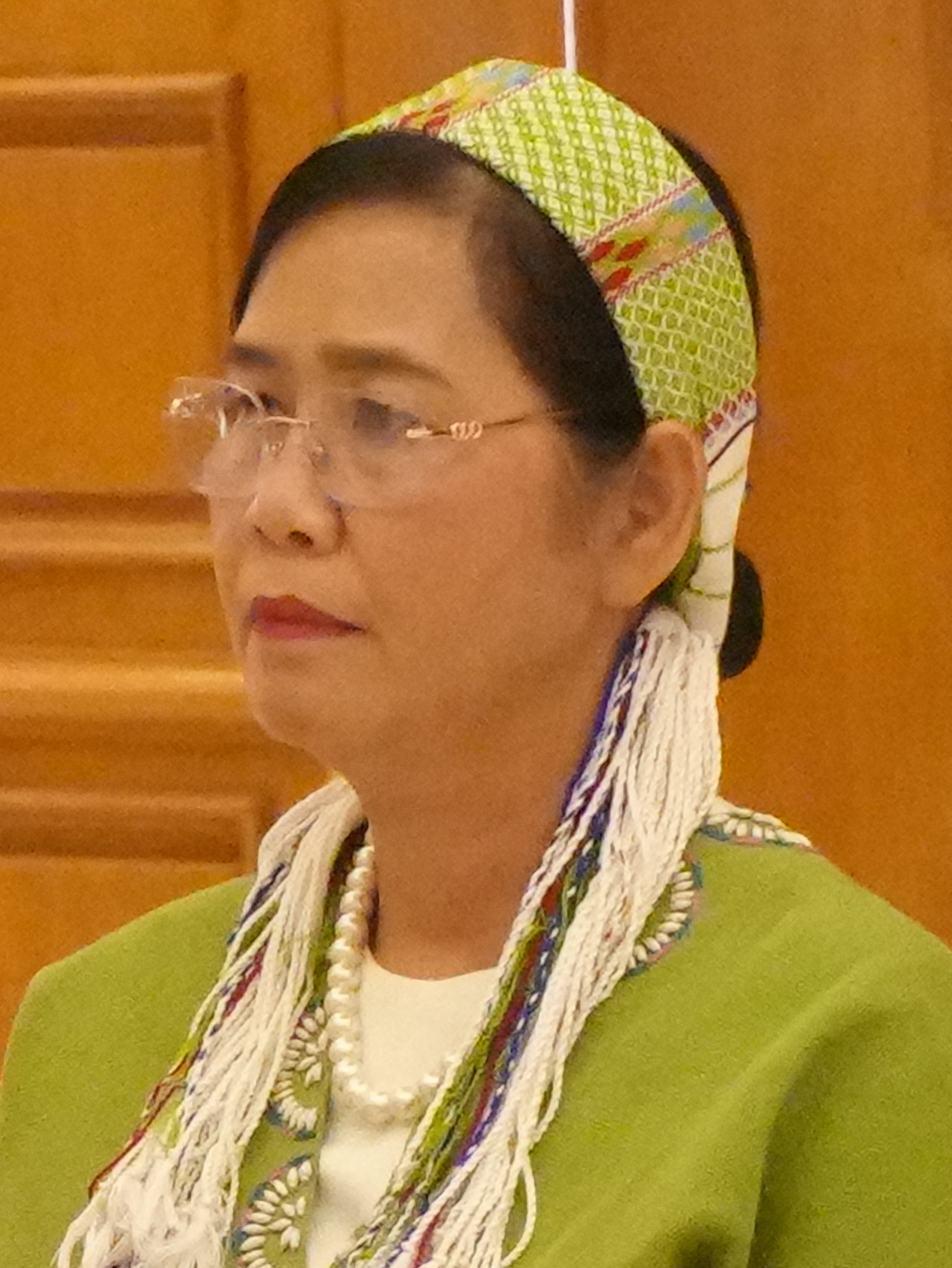
Nominee	Min Aung Hlaing	Nyo Saw	Nan Ni Ni Aye
Party	Independent	USDP	USDP
Electoral vote	429	126	29
Percentage	73.46%	21.58%	4.97%
Committee	Pyithu Hluttaw	Tatmadaw	Amyotha Hluttaw
President before election
Min Aung Hlaing (acting)
Military
Elected President
Min Aung Hlaing
Independent (Supported by USDP)
Vice Presidents before election
First VP vacant
Second VP vacant
Elected Vice Presidents
First VP Nyo Saw
Second VP Nan Ni Ni Aye
USDP

An indirect presidential election was held in Myanmar on 3 April 2026, following the 2025–26 Myanmar general election. Min Aung Hlaing, the country's military leader since the 2021 coup, won the election, while Nyo Saw and Nan Ni Ni Aye were elected as vice presidents. The winners were inaugurated on 10 April.

The election was the first since the 2018 Myanmar presidential election and the 2021 Myanmar coup d'état. The nomination process for the Presidential Electoral College began on 30 March, and the election was held at the Pyidaungsu Hluttaw, chaired by Speaker Aung Lin Dwe.

== Process ==
The Presidential Electoral College appoints the president, consisting of the Pyithu Hluttaw committee (elected MPs only), the Amyotha Hluttaw committee (elected MPs only), and the Tatmadaw committee (serving military personnel appointed to both houses by the commander-in-chief of Defence Services). Each committee nominates one candidate. Aung Lin Dwe presided over the election in his capacity as Speaker of the Pyidaungsu Hluttaw.

== Potential candidates ==
Military ruler Min Aung Hlaing was expected by most analysts to be a candidate and likely winner, though he declined to reveal his intentions publicly before being nominated. He was expected to step down as Commander-in-Chief before the nomination process began on March 30, as presidential candidates are constitutionally barred from concurrently holding another office, and did so on 30 March, with the NDSC appointing Ye Win Oo to replace him.

== Candidates ==
The committees of the Pyithu Hluttaw and Amyotha Hluttaw convened on March 30, 2026, to decide on the nominations. The selection was made through a vote the following day, March 31, 2026.

=== Pyithu Hluttaw committee ===
Two candidates were put forward for nomination by members of the Pyithu Hluttaw committee. USDP member Kyaw Kyaw Htay proposed the acting president Min Aung Hlaing. Kyaw Swe of National Unity Party was also put forward.

Candidate	Party	Votes	%
Min Aung Hlaing	Independent	247	96.11
Kyaw Swe	National Unity Party	10	3.89
Total		257	100.00
Valid votes		257	98.85
Invalid/blank votes		3	1.15
Total votes		260	100.00
Registered voters/turnout		260	100.00

=== Amyotha Hluttaw committee ===
The Amyotha Hluttaw committee is considering Kachin State People's Party's chairman Manam Tu Ja and Kayin State Hluttaw member Nan Ni Ni Aye of USDP.

Candidate	Party	Votes	%
Nan Ni Ni Aye	Union Solidarity and Development Party	117	75.48
Manam Tu Ja	Kachin State People's Party	38	24.52
Total		155	100.00
Valid votes		155	100.00
Invalid/blank votes		0	0.00
Total votes		155	100.00
Registered voters/turnout		155	100.00

=== Military committee ===
Candidate	Party	Votes	%
Nyo Saw	Union Solidarity and Development Party	166	100.00
Total		166	100.00
Registered voters/turnout		166	–

== Results ==
On 30 March 2026, Nan Ni Ni Aye was nominated for the vice presidency by the Amyotha Hluttaw and was elected on 31 March with 117 votes, becoming the first woman to hold the office in the country's history. Also Nyo Saw and Min Aung Hlaing were also elected to vice-presidency, before one of them becomes president.

The results of the election held at the Pyidaungsu Hluttaw on 3 April 2026 are as follows.

Candidate	Party	Votes	%
Min Aung Hlaing	Independent	429	73.46
Nyo Saw	Union Solidarity and Development Party	126	21.58
Nan Ni Ni Aye	Union Solidarity and Development Party	29	4.97
Total		584	100.00
Valid votes		584	100.00
Invalid/blank votes		0	0.00
Total votes		584	100.00
Registered voters/turnout		584	100.00

== Inauguration ==
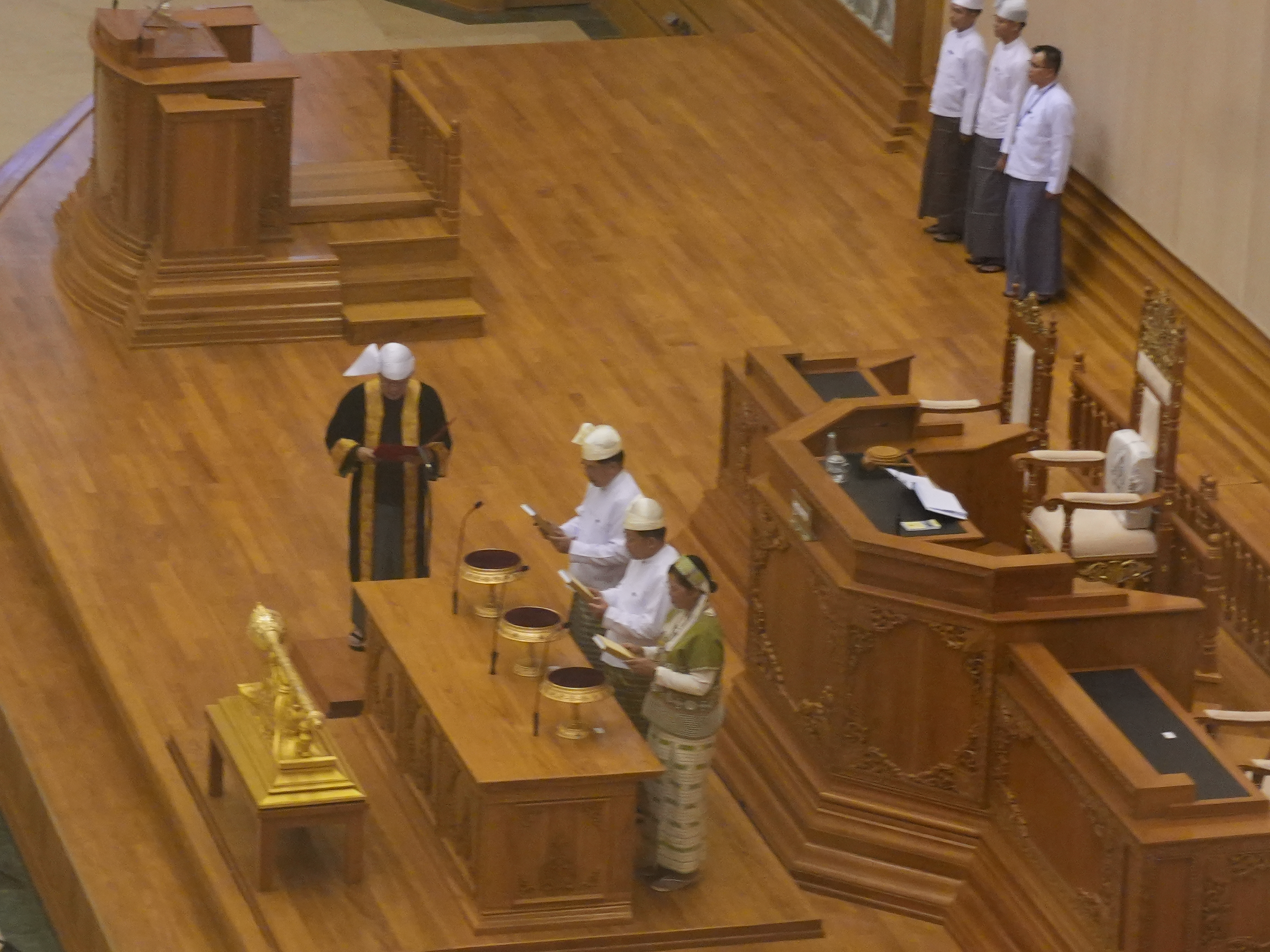
Min Aung Hlaing, Nyo Saw, and Nan Ni Ni Aye taking the oath of office at the Pyidaungsu Hluttaw, administered by Speaker Aung Lin Dwe, on 10 April 2026

On 10 April 2026, Min Aung Hlaing was inaugurated as president at the Pyidaungsu Hluttaw, alongside his two vice presidents. That same day, he established a new Union Government of Myanmar, appointing many individuals who had served in his previous ministries.

== Political position of the candidates ==
Min Aung Hlaing is reportedly a supporter of Burmese Way to Socialism, while formerly supporting privatization. The political positions of both Nyo Saw and Nan Ni Ni Aye are not known. They are members of the Union Solidarity and Development Party, which supports Min Aung Hlaing and his military junta.

== Reactions ==
=== Domestic ===
The United Wa State Army, National Democratic Alliance Army, and Ta'ang National Liberation Army express congratulations over the inauguration of Min Aung Hlaing as president.

=== International ===
- Belarus: President Alexander Lukashenko sent a congratulatory message to Min Aung Hlaing.
- Cambodia: King Norodom Sihamoni congratulated Min Aung Hlaing on his election in a statement on 6 April.
- China: President Xi Jinping sent a congratulatory message to Min Aung Hlaing.
- India: Prime Minister Narendra Modi invited Min Aung Hlaing to New Delhi for an "official visit" shortly after he was inaugurated, with the Ministry of External Affairs referring to Min Aung Hlaing as the "civilian" president of Myanmar, effectively recognizing his election. It became Min Aung Hlaing's first foreign visit after becoming the president.
- Japan: Japan made no statement on Min Aung Hlaing's election, and Chief Cabinet Secretary Minoru Kihara refused to comment when asked.
- Kazakhstan: President Kassym-Jomart Tokayev congratulated Min Aung Hlaing on his election in a statement on 4 April.
- Nicaragua: Co-presidents Daniel Ortega and Rosario Murillo congratulated Min Aung Hlaing in a joint statement on April 3.
- North Korea: The Ministry of Foreign Affairs said North Korea took note of the parliamentary election and the presidential inauguration and that it country respects "the aspirations and choice of the people of Myanmar to achieve solid socio-political stability and create a peaceful and sustainable development environment in Myanmar."
- Russia: President Vladimir Putin had already congratulated Min Aung Hlaing in February on the results of the general election. Security Council Secretary Sergei Shoigu reiterated Russia's support by congratulating Min Aung Hlaing specifically on his appointment as President in April.
- Thailand: Prime minister Anutin Charnvirakul sent a letter of congratulation to Min Aung Hlaing, becoming the first ASEAN country leader to do so.
- United States: The US State Department did not comment on Min Aung Hlaing winning the election. Secretary Marco Rubio had put a new policy in place in 2025 that the Department would no longer comment on the legitimacy of other countries' elections, a decision which the editorial board of The Washington Post linked to the upcoming Myanmar general election.
