= Second Min Aung Hlaing cabinet =

Government of Myanmar

- 6th Union Government of Myanmar
- 2026–present
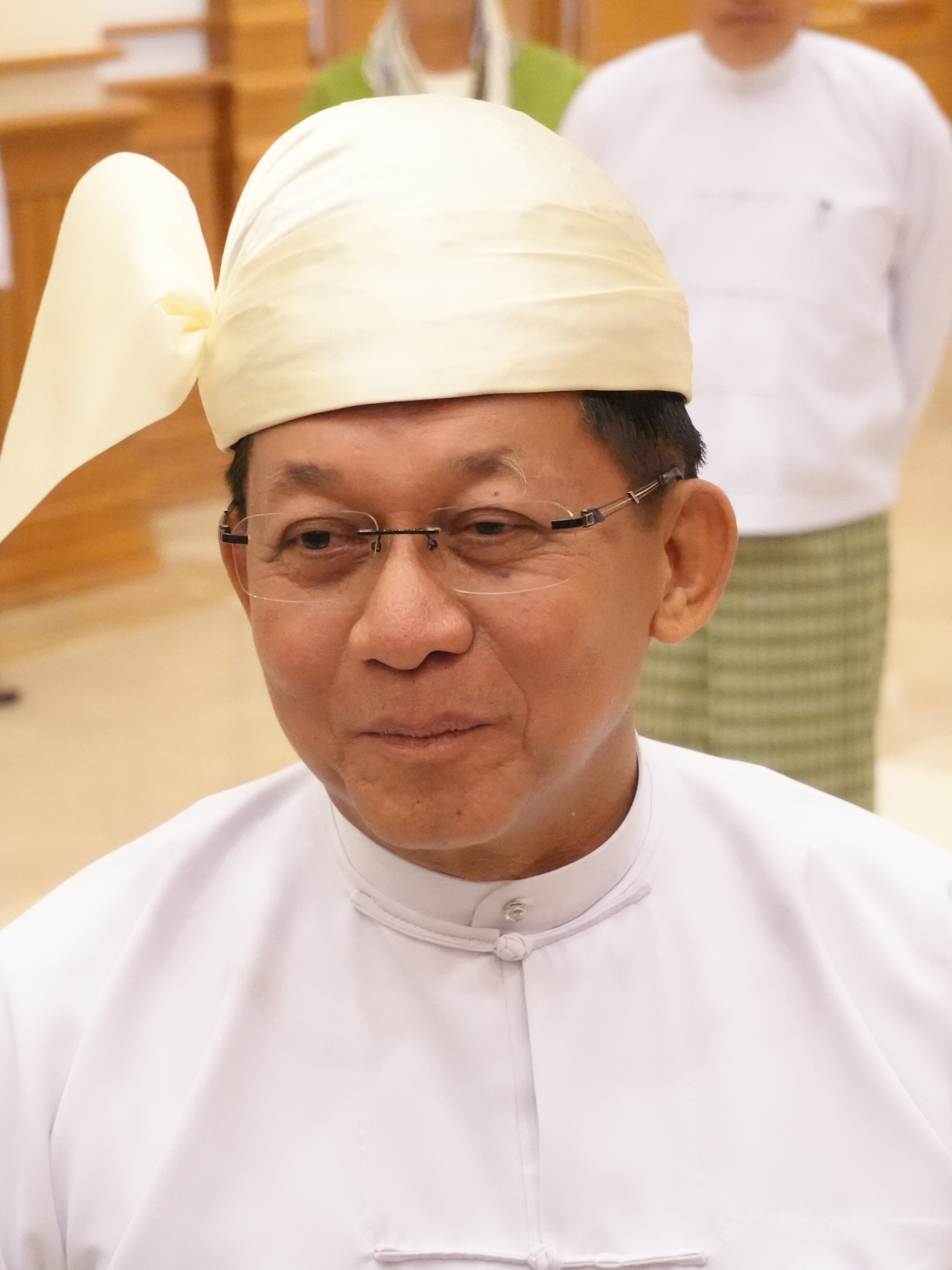
- President Min Aung Hlaing in 2026
- Date formed: 10 April 2026

People and organisations
- Head of state: Min Aung Hlaing
- Head of government: Min Aung Hlaing
- Deputy head of government: Nyo Saw (1st Vice President); Nan Ni Ni Aye (2nd Vice President)
- No. of ministers: 34
- Member party: Tatmadaw; Union Solidarity and Development Party

History
- Incoming formation: 2026 Myanmar presidential election
- Predecessor: Cabinet of Nyo Saw

The second cabinet of Min Aung Hlaing (officially Union Government of the Republic of the Union of Myanmar), was formed after 2025-2026 general election. It is the current executive body of Myanmar and the sixth government of Myanmar under the 2008 constitution and the third cabinet after 2021 Myanmar coup d'état.

Min Aung Hlaing was elected as 11th President of Myanmar by the 3rd Pyidaungsu Hluttaw on 3 April 2026.

== History ==
On 6 April 2026, the president-elect submitted the proposal to set 31 Union ministries and 30 Union ministers to the Pyidaungsu Hluttaw session.

On 10 April 2026, Min Aung Hlaing and his cabinet are officially sworn into office. A 34-member Union Government of Myanmar was formed.

== Cabinet ==
=== Executive Branch ===
		Term in Office		
	Name	Took Office	Left Office	Duration
President	Min Aung Hlaing	10 April 2026	Incumbent	223 days
Vice President-1	Nyo Saw	10 April 2026	Incumbent	223 days
Vice President-2	Nan Ni Ni Aye	10 April 2026	Incumbent	223 days

=== Ministers ===
On 10 April 2026, the President's Office Order 1/2026 announced the formation of the Union Government of Myanmar with the following members.

Following government reshuffle in October 2026, Union MInisters are as follows:

	Name	Portfolio
1	Min Aung Hlaing	President
2	Nyo Saw	Vice President
3	Nan Ni Ni Aye	Vice President
4	Khin Maung Yi	Union Minister attached to the Office of the President
5	Tin Aung San	Union Minister of the President's Office
6	Mya Tun Oo	Union Minister for Transport
7	Tun Aung	Union Minister for Digital Development and Communications
8	Lt General Yar Pyae	Union Minister for Defence
9	General Ko Ko Oo	Union Minister for Home Affairs
10	Tin Maung Swe	Union Minister for Foreign Affairs
11	Aung Kyaw Hoe	Union Minister for National Planning, Investment and Foreign Economic Relations
12	Dr Kan Zaw	Union Minister for Finance and Revenue
13	Lt. General Phone Myat	Union Minister for Border Affairs
14	Than Maung	Union Minister for Ethnic Affairs
15	Dr Thida Oo	Union Minister for Legal Affairs
16	Chaw Chaw Sein	Union Minister for Education
17	Dr Myo Thein Kyaw	Union Minister for Science and Technology
18	Dr Soe Win	Union Minister for Health
19	Dr Thet Thet Zin	Union Minister for Women's Affairs
20	Thein Lin	Union Minister for Information
21	Tin Oo Lwin	Union Minister for Religious Affairs
22	Min Naung	Union Minister for Agriculture, Livestock and Irrigation
23	Myo Zaw Thein	Union Minister for Cooperatives and Rural Development
24	San Oo	Union Minister for Natural Resources and Environmental Conservation
25	Ko Ko Lwin	Union Minister for Electricity and Energy
26	Dr Charlie Than	Union Minister for Industry and MSMEs Development
27	Myint Kyaing	Union Minister for Immigration and Population
28	Maung Myint	Union Minister for Labour
29	Tun Ohn	Union Minister for Commerce
30	Ye Myint Tun	Union Minister for Sports
31	Dr Maung Thin	Union Minister for Youth Affairs
32	Myo Thant	Union Minister for Construction
33	Dr Ko Ko Lwin	Union Minister for Social Welfare, Relief and Resettlement
34	Khin Maung Soe	Union Minister for Culture, Hotels and Tourism
35	Permanent Secretary	Secretary, Union Government Office

=== Deputy Ministers ===
A total of 46 deputy ministers were also appointed on 10 April 2026.

No	Ministry	Name	Took office	Left office
1	Ministry of President’s Office	Khin Latt	10 April 2026	
2	Ministry of President’s Office	Htin Kyaw Thu	10 April 2026	
3	Ministry of Transport	Aung Myaing	10 April 2026	
4	Ministry of Transport	Tun Lu	10 April 2026	
5	Ministry of Digital Development and Communications	Min Zeyar Hlaing	10 April 2026	
6	Ministry of Digital Development and Communications	Thet Win Aung	10 April 2026	
7	Ministry of Defence	Maj-Gen Aung Myo Thant	10 April 2026	
8	Ministry of Home Affairs	Maj-Gen Min Thu	10 April 2026	
9	Ministry of Foreign Affairs	Naing Min Kyaw	10 April 2026	
10	Ministry of Foreign Affairs	Ko Ko Kyaw	10 April 2026	
11	Ministry of National Planning, Investment and Foreign Economic Relations	Kyaw Htin	10 April 2026	
12	Ministry of National Planning, Investment and Foreign Economic Relations	Thant Sin Lwin	10 April 2026	
13	Ministry of Finance and Revenue	Than Than Lin	10 April 2026	
14	Ministry of Finance and Revenue	Han Win Aung	10 April 2026	
15	Ministry of Border Affairs	Maj-Gen Kyaw Swa Oo	10 April 2026	
16	Ministry of Ethnic Affairs	Sai Tun Nyo	10 April 2026	
17	Ministry of Legal Affairs	Htein Linn Oo	10 April 2026	
18	Ministry of Education		10 April 2026	
19	Ministry of Education	Nay Myo Hlaing	10 April 2026	
20	Ministry of Science and Technology	Nay Chi Lei Lei Thein	10 April 2026	
21	Ministry of Health		10 April 2026	
22	Ministry of Women’s Affairs		10 April 2026	
23	Ministry of Information	Ye Tint	10 April 2026	
24	Ministry of Religious Affairs	Lin Aung	10 April 2026	
25	Ministry of Agriculture, Livestock and Irrigation	Bo Bo Kyaw	10 April 2026	
26	Ministry of Agriculture, Livestock and Irrigation	Ye Tun Win	10 April 2026	
27	Ministry of Agriculture, Livestock and Irrigation	Ye Tint Tun	10 April 2026	
28	Ministry of Cooperatives and Rural Development	Thaik Soe	10 April 2026	
29	Ministry of Natural Resources and Environmental Conservation	Khin Latt Gyi	10 April 2026	
30	Ministry of Natural Resources and Environmental Conservation	Thaung Naing Oo	10 April 2026	
31	Ministry of Electric Power and Energy	Aye Kyaw	10 April 2026	
32	Ministry of Electric Power and Energy	Kyaw Naing Win	10 April 2026	
33	Ministry of Industry and MSME Business Development	Thwin Aung	10 April 2026	
34	Ministry of Industry and MSME Business Development	Aung Zeya	10 April 2026	
35	Ministry of Immigration and Population	Lin Zaw Tun	10 April 2026	
36	Ministry of Immigration and Population	Khaing Khaing Soe	10 April 2026	
37	Ministry of Labour	Maung Maung Than	10 April 2026	
38	Ministry of Commerce	Min Min	10 April 2026	
39	Ministry of Commerce	Win Myint Khaing	10 April 2026	
40	Ministry of Sports	Nyi Nyi	10 April 2026	
41	Ministry of Youth Affairs	Sitt Naing	10 April 2026	
42	Ministry of Construction	Myo Myint	10 April 2026	
43	Ministry of Social Welfare, Relief and Resettlement	Than Soe	10 April 2026	
44	Ministry of Social Welfare, Relief and Resettlement	Thant Zaw Lwin	10 April 2026	
45	Ministry of Culture, Hotels and Tourism	Aye Tun	10 April 2026	
46	Ministry of Culture, Hotels and Tourism	Phyo Zaw Soe	10 April 2026	
