= 2018 Myanmar presidential election =

2018 Myanmar presidential by-election
- 28 March 2018

636 members of the Electoral College 319 electoral votes needed to win
- Turnout: 636 (96.80%)
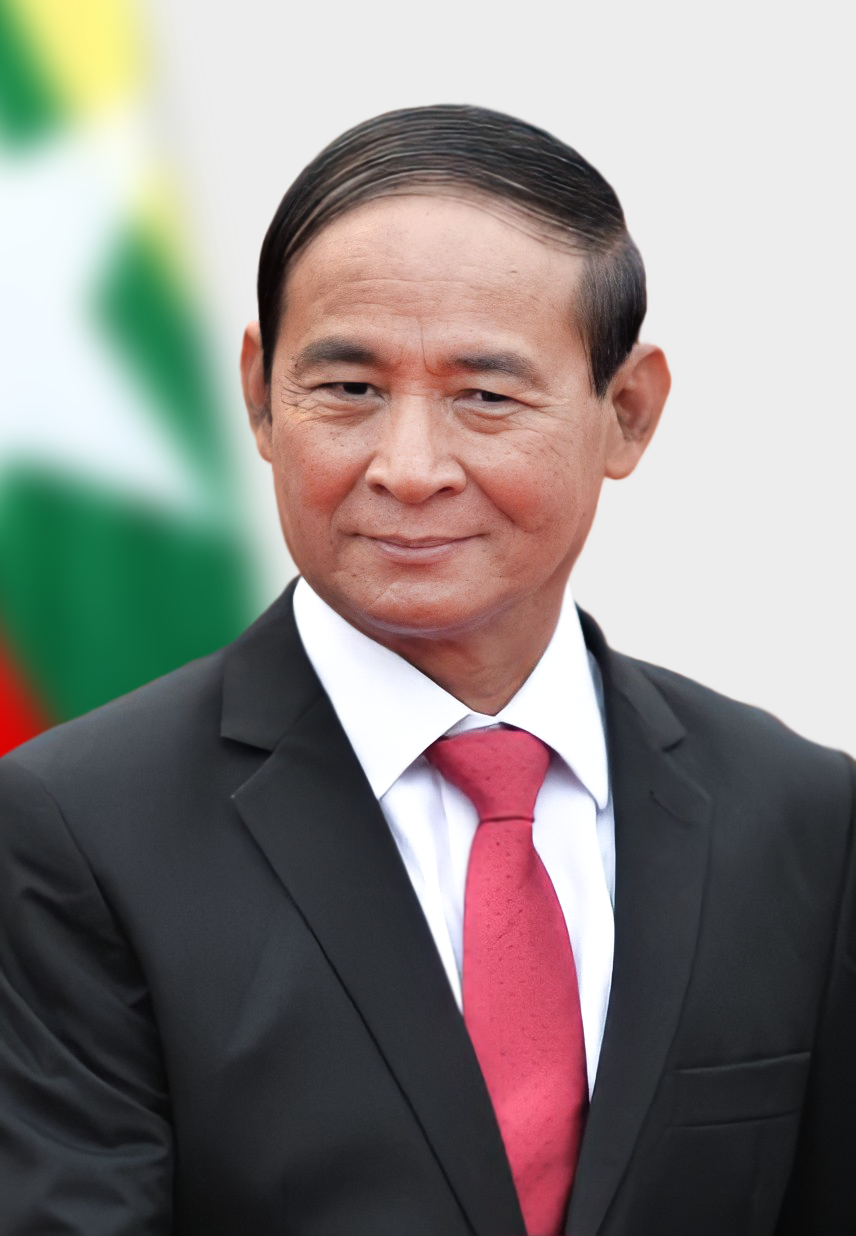

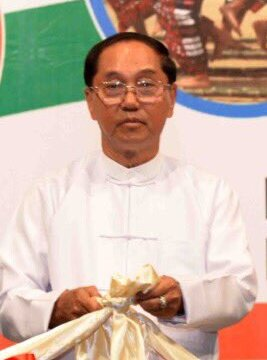

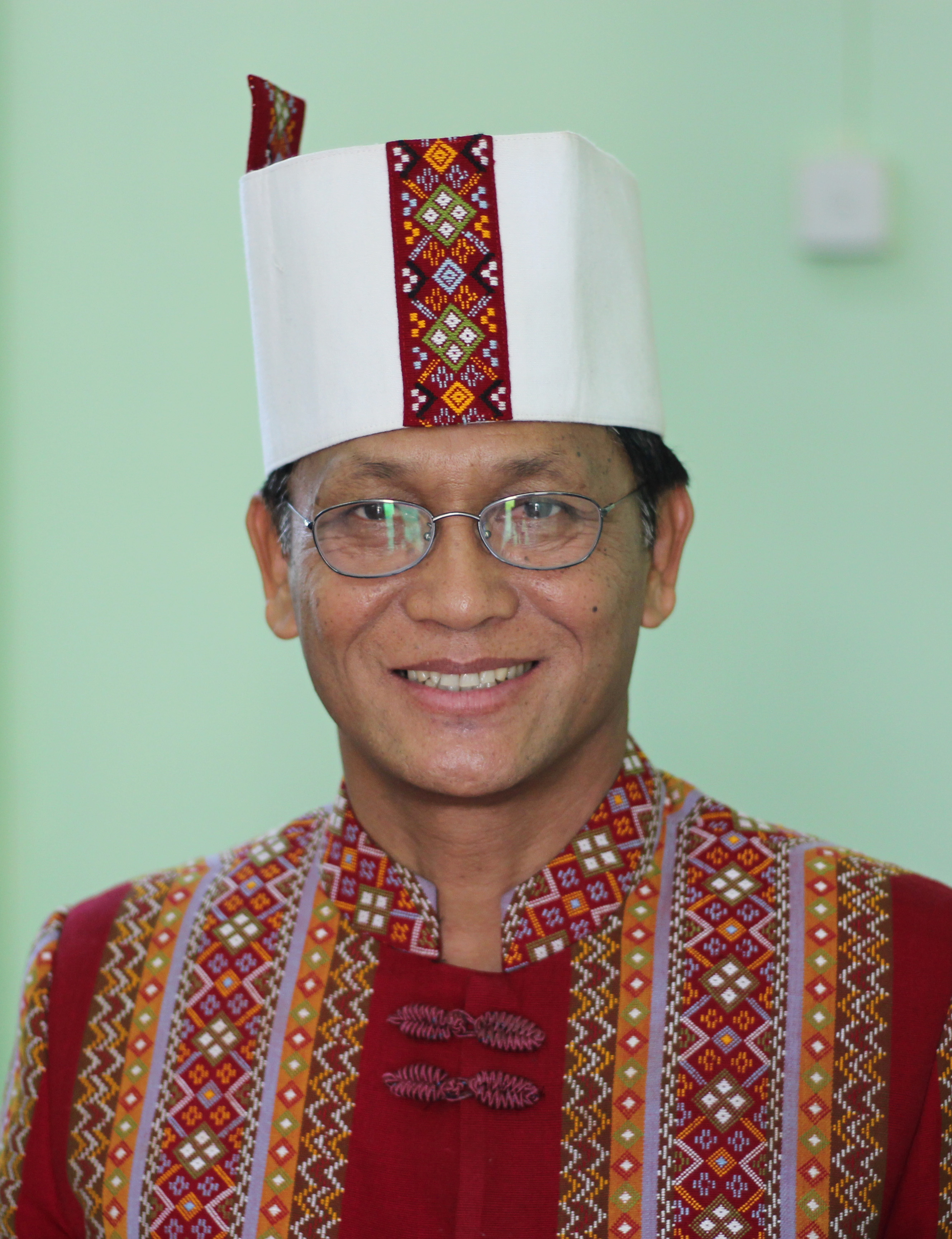
Nominee	Win Myint	Myint Swe	Henry Van Thio
Party	NLD	USDP	NLD
Electoral vote	403	211	18
Percentage	63.77%	33.39%	2.85%
Committee	Pyithu Hluttaw	Tatmadaw	Amyotha Hluttaw
President before election
Myint Swe (acting)
USDP
Elected President
Win Myint
NLD
Vice Presidents before election
Myint Swe (First)
USDP
Henry Van Thio (Second)
NLD
Elected Vice Presidents
Myint Swe (First)
USDP
Henry Van Thio (Second)
NLD

An indirect presidential by-election was held in Myanmar on 28 March 2018, after the resignation of Htin Kyaw. Members of the Assembly of the Union voted for his replacement.

The election was the first by-election presidential election held under the 2008 constitution.

Win Myint was elected president.

== Resignation of Htin Kyaw ==
President Htin Kyaw of the National League for Democracy party resigned on 21 March 2018, due to ill health. 1st Vice-President, Myint Swe, was sworn in as acting president.

== Electoral system ==
Under the 2008 constitution, Myanmar has a president, and two vice-presidents. They are elected by the Pyidaungsu Hluttaw, the national legislature.

The Pyidaungsu Hluttaw consists of two chambers, Pyithu Hluttaw, and Amyotha Hluttaw. Most seats are directly elected, but a quarter of the seats in both chambers are appointed by the Tatmadaw.

Chamber	Type	MPs
Pyithu Hluttaw	Directly-elected	330
Pyithu Hluttaw	Military-appointed	110
Amyotha Hluttaw	Directly-elected	168
Amyotha Hluttaw	Military-appointed	56

The Presidential Electoral College is made up of three committees:

- The directly elected MPs from Pyithu Hluttaw (330).
- The directly elected MPs from Amyotha Hluttaw (168).
- The military appointees in both chambers (166).

Each committee nominates a single candidate. The whole Pyidaungsu Hluttaw then votes, with all three nominees on the ballot together and each of the 664 MPs being entitled to one vote. The vote is a secret ballot. The candidate that receives the highest number of votes is president, the candidate with the second highest number of votes is 1st vice-president, and the remaining candidate is 2nd vice-president. This system guarantees the military at least one vice-president.

In the event of the resignation, death, permanent disability or otherwise vacant nature of the office of the president, the constitution calls for the 1st vice-president to serve as acting president. An election must be held within 21 days. The committee that nominated the candidate that subsequently was elected president nominates a replacement, and the other two vice-presidents are automatically candidates.

== Candidates ==
Win Myint was nominated by the committee from Pyithu Hluttaw. He was a member of that house from the Tamwe Township. He was also the Speaker. Thaung Aye, a member of the Pyithu Hluttaw from the Pyawbwe Township, was nominated by the USDP.

The nomination election occurred on 23 March 2018.

Candidate	Party	Votes	%
Win Myint	National League for Democracy	273	91.00
Thaung Aye	Union Solidarity and Development Party	27	9.00
Total		300	100.00
Valid votes		300	98.68
Invalid/blank votes		4	1.32
Total votes		304	100.00
Registered voters/turnout		323	94.12

Seven Pyithu Hluttaw seats were vacant.

Myint Swe (USDP) and Henry Van Thio (NLD) were the vice-presidents, and therefore became candidates.

== Results ==
The election was held on 28 March 2018.

Candidate	Party	Votes	%
Win Myint	National League for Democracy	403	63.77
Myint Swe	Union Solidarity and Development Party	211	33.39
Henry Van Thio	National League for Democracy	18	2.85
Total		632	100.00
Valid votes		632	99.37
Invalid/blank votes		4	0.63
Total votes		636	100.00
Registered voters/turnout		657	96.80
Source: Index Mundi

Seven Pyithu Hluttaw seats were vacant.

Win Myint was sworn in as President of Myanmar on 30 March 2018.
