= Ministry of National Planning and Economic Development =

Government ministry of Myanmar

- အမျိုးသားစီမံကိန်းနှင့် စီးပွားရေးဖွံ့ဖြိုးတိုးတက်မှုဝန်ကြီးဌာန

Ministry overview
- Formed: 1948; 78 years ago (first); 17 February 1993; 33 years ago (second); 31 July 2025; 12 months ago (current)
- Dissolved: 15 March 1972; 54 years ago (first); 30 March 2016; 10 years ago (second)
- Jurisdiction: Government of Myanmar
- Headquarters: Naypyidaw
- Minister responsible: Ret. Gen Nyo Saw, Minister of National Planning and Economic Development
- Deputy Minister responsible: Kyaw Htin, Deputy Minister of National Planning and Economic Development
- Website: www.mnped.gov.mm

The Ministry of National Planning and Economic Development (Burmese: အမျိုးသားစီမံကိန်းနှင့် စီးပွားရေး ဖွံ့ဖြိုးတိုးတက်မှု ဝန်ကြီးဌာန; abbreviated MNPED) was a ministry that administered Myanmar's economic development and national planning policies.

MNPED was led by Nyo Saw, a man who was appointed by Min Aung Hlaing, the Chairman of the now defunct State Security and Peace Commission, on 31 July 2025 to the position of Prime Minister. Nyo Saw is currently serving as Vice-President of Myanmar.

== History ==
After 1948, the new government organized the Ministry of National Planning to rebuild the country.

The ministry is composed with Ministry of Industry, Ministry of Religious Affairs and Union Culture and Ministry of Defence. In 1964, it became reserve as Ministry of National Planning. In those years, the ministry performed as National Planning Board, Economic Planning Board, Economic and Social Board.

On 15 March 1972, it was composed with Ministry of Finance and Taxas Ministry of Planning and Finance. On February 17, 1993, the Ministry of Planning and Finance was organized as the Ministry of National Planning and Economic Development and Ministry of Finance and Tax.

On 30 March 2016, the president Htin Kyaw composed those two ministries as Ministry of Planning and Finance.

== See also ==
- Economy of Burma
- Cabinet of Burma
