= Anna Sui Hluan =

Burmese linguist

Her Excellency Anna Sui Hluan
- အန်နာရွှေလွှမ်း

Second Lady of Myanmar
- In office 30 March 2016 – 22 April 2024
- Vice President: Henry Van Thio
- Preceded by: Khin Aye Myint

Personal details
- Born: Chin State, Burma
- Spouse: Henry Van Thio
- Children: 3
- Parent: Ral Buai (father)
- Education: University of Otago

Anna Sui Hluan (Burmese: အန်နာရွှေလွှမ်း) is a Burmese linguist, researcher, Christian preacher, and social activist. She was the Second Lady of Myanmar from 2016 to 2024 during her husband Henry Van Thio's Vice Presidency.

== Early life and education ==
Anna Sui Hluan was born in Chin State, Burma, into a family of Christian pastors, and grew up in Yangon. Her father, Rev. Ral Buai, was a preacher who founded the Apostolic Christian Bible College (ACBC). In 1988, many schools were closed due to nationwide protests, so she enrolled in a nearby Bible college instead. She is married to Henry Van Thio and has three children. When she gained a scholarship to study theology at the University of Otago, the family moved to New Zealand to live in the Dunedin suburb of North East Valley in 2011.

== Career ==
Anna Sui Hluan's work has focused on research, social activism, and women's leadership. She is a lecturer at the Myanmar Evangelical Graduate School of Theology. She worked as an assistant pastor and women's commission member of the Myanmar Evangelical Christian Fellowship for twelve years before becoming its president. She is the patron of the Dingdi Dream Organization, which is dedicated to assisting individuals and communities in Chin State.

On 30 March 2016, she became Second Lady of the country when her husband Henry Van Thio was sworn in as Second Vice President of Myanmar under the Constitution of Myanmar. She led the first Myanmar Women Leaders Program, which was held in Europe in 2019. She was named one of the most influential and talented Burmese women of the year 2019. She published "Silence" in Translation in 2022.

== Works ==
- "Silence" in Translation (2022)

Honorary titles
Preceded by Khin Aye Myint	Second Lady of Myanmar; 2016–present	Incumbent
