= Iran–Myanmar relations =

- Iran: Myanmar

Iran–Myanmar relations refers to the bilateral relationship between Iran and Myanmar.

== History ==
The relationship deteriorated during the Rohingya genocide. Iranian Foreign Minister Javad Zarif condemned Myanmar on behalf of the Iranian government, urging the international community to take action before it was too late. In September 2017, he said "The international community has no excuse to allow the genocide of Rohingya Muslims to continue in front of our eyes". Iranian President Hassan Rouhani said his country would work to mount pressure on Myanmar from international side to resolve the Rohingya crisis. during a meeting with Bangladeshi Prime Minister Sheikh Hasina, he said "We will work to create international pressure on Myanmar (to resolve the Rohingya crisis)." Supreme Leader Ali Khamenei also condemned the persecution of Rohingya Muslims in Myanmar and called Myanmar's leader laureate Aung San Suu Kyi a "brutal woman".

The relationship started improving following the 2021 Myanmar coup d'état and the subsequent start of the Myanmar civil war. In January 2022, an Iranian government delegation secretly visited Myanmar to sell guided missiles and other military equipment. Iran has also become an important supplier of jet fuel to Myanmar, allowing the Tatmadaw to gain an advantage during the civil war. According to Reuters, from October 2024 to December 2025, Iran delivered a total of about 175,000 tons of jet fuel to Myanmar. From 2023 to 2026, Iran has also been the largest supplier of urea to Myanmar, used for manufacturing explosives, with shipments ranging from 400,000 to 600,000 tons. In December 2025, Iranian President Masoud Pezeshkian met with Myanmar Prime Minister Nyo Saw in Turkmenistan. Iran was invited to observe the 2025–26 Myanmar general election.
