= Presidential Electoral College =

Elects the President of Myanmar

The Presidential Electoral College (Burmese: သမ္မတရွေးချယ်တင်မြှောက်ရေးအဖွဲ့) is an electoral college made up of MPs that elects the President of Myanmar.

== Composition ==
It consists of three separate committees:

1. MPs who represent the proportions of MPs elected from each Region or State (the Amyotha Hluttaw)
2. MPs who represent the proportions of MPs elected from each township population (the Pyithu Hluttaw)
3. Military-appointed MPs personally nominated by the Tatmadaw Commander-in-Chief (the combined military representatives from both above houses of the Pyidaungsu Hluttaw)

== Nomination and selection ==
Each of the three committees nominate a presidential candidate. Afterward, all the Pyidaungsu Hluttaw MPs vote for one of three candidates—the candidate with the highest number of votes is elected President, while the other two are elected as Vice Presidents. The Vice Presidents are designated as First and Second Vice President based on who received the second and third highest number of votes.

== 2011 election ==
The election was held on 4 February 2011.

Candidate	Party	Votes	%
Thein Sein (elected president)	Union Solidarity and Development Party	408	62.39
Tin Aung Myint Oo (elected first vice-president)	Union Solidarity and Development Party	171	26.15
Sai Mauk Kham (elected second vice-president)	Union Solidarity and Development Party	75	11.47
Total		654	100.00
Registered voters/turnout		659	–
Source: Asia News

Five Pyithu Hluttaw seats were vacant.

The elected candidates were sworn in on 30 March 2011.

== 2016 election ==
The election was held on 15 March 2016.

Candidate	Party	Votes	%
Htin Kyaw (elected president)	National League for Democracy	360	55.21
Myint Swe (elected first vice-president)	Union Solidarity and Development Party	213	32.67
Henry Van Thio (elected second vice-president)	National League for Democracy	79	12.12
Total		652	100.00
Registered voters/turnout		657	–
Source: The Irrawdday

Seven Pyithu Hluttaw seats were vacant.

The elected candidates were sworn in on 30 March 2016.

== 2018 by-election ==
The election was held on 28 March 2018.

Candidate	Party	Votes	%
Win Myint	National League for Democracy	403	63.77
Myint Swe	Union Solidarity and Development Party	211	33.39
Henry Van Thio	National League for Democracy	18	2.85
Total		632	100.00
Valid votes		632	99.37
Invalid/blank votes		4	0.63
Total votes		636	100.00
Registered voters/turnout		657	96.80
Source: Index Mundi

Seven Pyithu Hluttaw seats were vacant.

Win Myint was sworn in as President of Myanmar on 30 March 2018.

== 2026 election ==
On 30 March 2026, Nan Ni Ni Aye was nominated for the vice presidency by the Amyotha Hluttaw and was elected on 31 March with 117 votes, becoming the first woman to hold the office in the country's history. Also Nyo Saw and Min Aung Hlaing were also elected to vice-presidency, before one of them becomes president.

The results of the election held at the Pyidaungsu Hluttaw on 3 April 2026 are as follows.

Candidate	Party	Votes	%
Min Aung Hlaing	Independent	429	73.46
Nyo Saw	Union Solidarity and Development Party	126	21.58
Nan Ni Ni Aye	Union Solidarity and Development Party	29	4.97
Total		584	100.00
Valid votes		584	100.00
Invalid/blank votes		0	0.00
Total votes		584	100.00
Registered voters/turnout		584	100.00
