= Union Government of Myanmar =

Executive body of the Burmese government

Union Government
- Burmese: ပြည်ထောင်စုအစိုးရအဖွဲ့
- State seal of Myanmar

Overview
- Established: 30 March 2011 (as Union Government)
- State: Republic of the Union of Myanmar
- Leader: President of Myanmar (Min Aung Hlaing)
- Appointed by: Pyidaungsu Hluttaw
- Ministries: Thirty-one
- Responsible to: Pyidaungsu Hluttaw
- Headquarters: Presidential Palace, Naypyidaw
- Website: Official website

The Union Government (Burmese: ပြည်ထောင်စုအစိုးရအဖွဲ့), is the executive body of the government of Myanmar led by the president of Myanmar.

The second cabinet of Min Aung Hlaing is the current cabinet.

== Qualifications ==
The 2008 Constitution of Myanmar stipulates that Union Ministers must be Burmese citizens who have been living in the country for at least ten consecutive years:

1. persons who have attained the age of 40 years;
2. persons who have qualifications, with the exception of the age limit, prescribed in Section 120 for Pyithu Hluttaw representatives;
3. persons whose qualification does not breach the provisions under Section 121 which disqualify a person from standing for election as Pyithu Hluttaw representatives;
4. persons loyal to the Union and its citizens

The Commander-in-Chief appoints the Ministers of Defence, Home Affairs and Border Affairs, selecting candidates from within the Defence Services (Tatmadaw), while the President appoints the remainder.

The President also appoints the Deputy Ministers of the respective ministries, following the same qualifications as those for Union Ministers, with the exception of age (35 years, instead of 40).

== Historical names and cabinets ==
Cabinet name changes		Head of Government			Cabinet
Period	Cabinet name	Title	Name	Tenure	Cabinet
4 Jan 1948 – 16 Mar 1952	Provisional Union Government	Prime Minister	Nu	4 Jan 1948 – 12 Jun 1956	
16 Mar 1952 – 29 Oct 1958	Union Government	Prime Minister	Nu	4 Jan 1948 – 12 Jun 1956	
16 Mar 1952 – 29 Oct 1958	Union Government	Prime Minister	Ba Swe	12 Jun 1956 – 1 Mar 1957	
16 Mar 1952 – 29 Oct 1958	Union Government	Prime Minister	Nu	1 Mar 1957 – 29 Oct 1958	
29 Oct 1958 – 4 Apr 1960	Caretaker Government	Prime Minister	Ne Win	29 Oct 1958 – 4 Apr 1960	Ne Win's First Cabinet
4 Apr 1960 – 2 Mar 1962	Union Government	Prime Minister	Nu	4 Apr 1960 – 2 Mar 1962	
2 Mar 1962 – 4 Mar 1962	State Revolutionary Government / Revolutionary Government of the Union of Burma	Chairman	Ne Win	2 Mar 1962 – 4 Mar 1962	ပြည်ထောင်စုမြန်မာနိုင်ငံ တော်လှန်ရေးအစိုးရ
4 Mar 1974 – 18 Sep 1988	Council of Ministers	Prime Minister	Sein Win	4 Mar 1974 – 29 Mar 1977	
4 Mar 1974 – 18 Sep 1988	Council of Ministers	Prime Minister	Maung Maung Kha	29 Mar 1977 – 26 Jul 1988	
4 Mar 1974 – 18 Sep 1988	Council of Ministers	Prime Minister	Tun Tin	26 Jul 1988 – 18 Sep 1988	
20 Sep 1988 – 30 Mar 2011	Government of the Union of Burma/Myanmar	Prime Minister	Saw Maung	20 Sep 1988 – 23 Apr 1992	ဦးစောမောင်အစိုးရ
20 Sep 1988 – 30 Mar 2011	Government of the Union of Burma/Myanmar	Prime Minister	Than Shwe	23 Apr 1992 – 25 Aug 2003	ဦးသန်းရွှေအစိုးရ
20 Sep 1988 – 30 Mar 2011	Government of the Union of Burma/Myanmar	Prime Minister	Than Shwe	23 Apr 1992 – 25 Aug 2003	ဗိုလ်ချုပ်မှူးကြီးသန်းရွှေ၏ ဒုတိယအစိုးရ
20 Sep 1988 – 30 Mar 2011	Government of the Union of Burma/Myanmar	Prime Minister	Khin Nyunt	25 Aug 2003 – 18 Oct 2004	ဗိုလ်ချုပ်ကြီးခင်ညွန့်အစိုးရ
20 Sep 1988 – 30 Mar 2011	Government of the Union of Burma/Myanmar	Prime Minister	Soe Win	19 Oct 2004 – 12 Oct 2007	ဗိုလ်ချုပ်ကြီးစိုးဝင်းအစိုးရ
20 Sep 1988 – 30 Mar 2011	Government of the Union of Burma/Myanmar	Prime Minister	Thein Sein	12 Oct 2007 – 7 Nov 2010	ဦးသိန်းစိန်၏ ပထမအစိုးရ
20 Sep 1988 – 30 Mar 2011	Government of the Union of Burma/Myanmar	Prime Minister	(vacant)	7 Nov 2010 – 30 Mar 2011	
30 Mar 2011 – 19 Feb 2021	Union Government	President	Thein Sein	30 Mar 2011 – 30 Mar 2016	Cabinet of Thein Sein
30 Mar 2011 – 19 Feb 2021	Union Government	President	Htin Kyaw	30 Mar 2016 – 21 Mar 2018	Cabinet of Htin Kyaw
30 Mar 2011 – 19 Feb 2021	Union Government	Acting President	Myint Swe	21 Mar 2016 – 30 Mar 2018	Cabinet of Htin Kyaw
30 Mar 2011 – 19 Feb 2021	Union Government	President	Win Myint	30 Mar 2018 – 1 Feb 2021	Cabinet of Win Myint
30 Mar 2011 – 19 Feb 2021	Union Government	( (Note: Exercised the power as the Commander-in-Chief of Defence Services without any other special titles on 1.2.2021. Took the Chairmanship of the State Administrative Council on 2 Feb 2021. Took the Chairmanship (equivalent to prime minister) of the Management Committee (equivalent to cabinet) on 19 Feb 2021))	Min Aung Hlaing	1 Feb 2021 – (Note: The cabinet meeting on 2 Feb 2021 still used the name "Union Government") 19 Feb 2021	Military cabinet of Min Aung Hlaing
19 Feb 2021 – 1 Aug 2021	Management Committee of the State Administration Council	Chairman (Note: Chaimanship of the Management Committee. Min Aung Hlaing maintained his chairmanship of SAC after the management committee and its chairman had been replaced by the provisional government and the prime minister.)	Min Aung Hlaing	19 Feb 2021 – 1 Aug 2021	Military cabinet of Min Aung Hlaing
1 Aug 2021 – 11 Sep 2021	Provisional Government of the Republic of the Union of Myanmar	Prime Minister	Min Aung Hlaing	1 Aug 2021 – 31 Jul 2025	Military cabinet of Min Aung Hlaing
11 Sep 2021 – present	Union Government	Prime Minister	Min Aung Hlaing	1 Aug 2021 – 31 Jul 2025	Military cabinet of Min Aung Hlaing
11 Sep 2021 – present	Union Government	Prime Minister	Nyo Saw	31 Jul 2025 – 10 Apr 2026	Cabinet of Nyo Saw
11 Sep 2021 – present	Union Government	President	Min Aung Hlaing	10 Apr 2026 – present	Second Min Aung Hlaing cabinet

== Historical titles of ministers ==
- 1948–1962: Minister for (Ministry)
- 1962–1972: Commissar for (Department)
- 1972–2011: Minister for (Ministry)
- 2011–present: Union Minister for (Ministry)
