= Nan Ni Ni Aye =

Burmese politician

Her Excellency Maha Thiri Thudhamma Nan Ni Ni Aye
- နန်းနီနီအေး
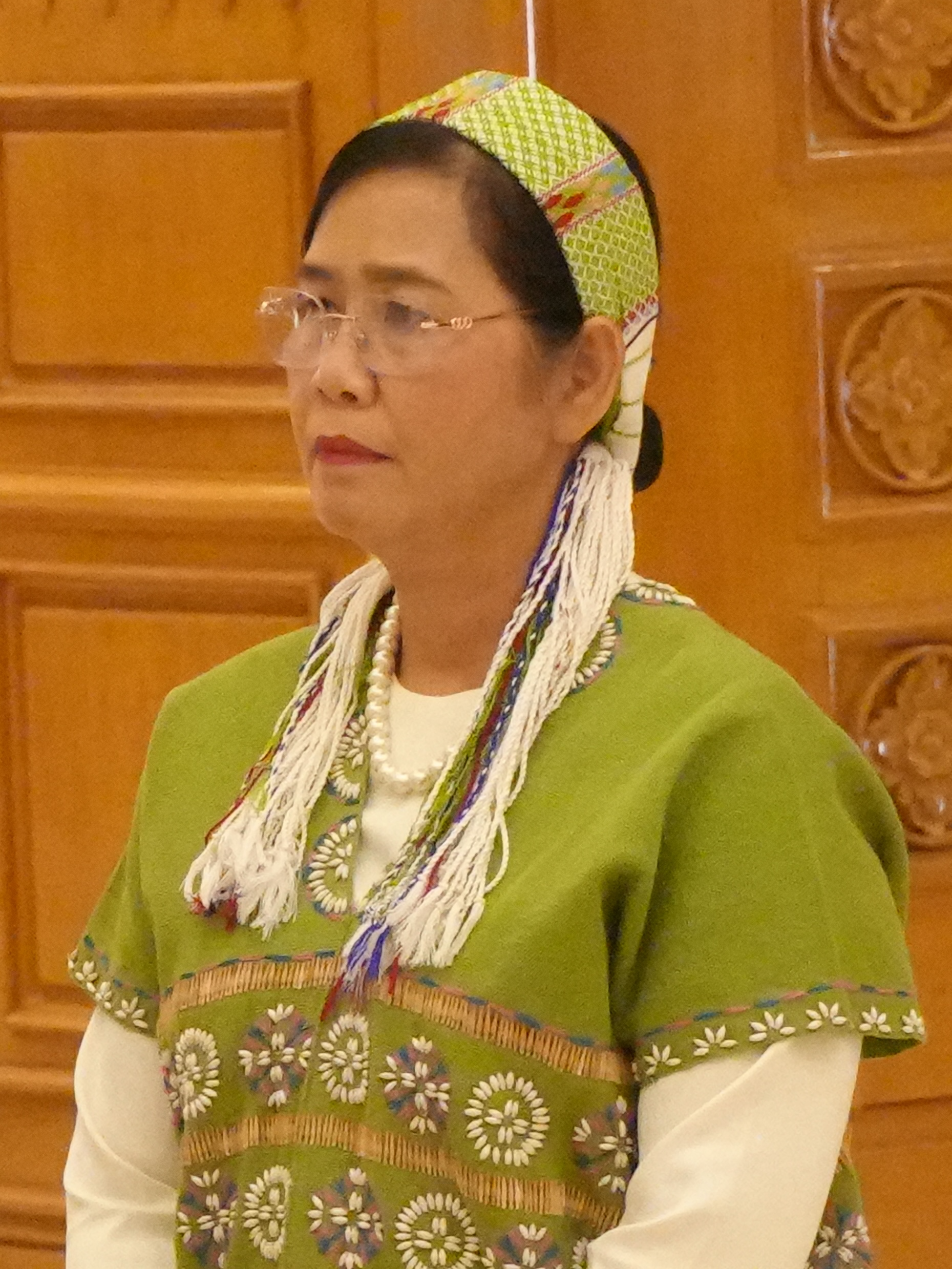
- Nan Ni Ni Aye in 2026

4th Second Vice President of Myanmar
- Incumbent
- Assumed office 10 April 2026 Serving with Nyo Saw
- President: Min Aung Hlaing
- Preceded by: Henry Van Thio

Member of the Kayin State Hluttaw
- In office 20 March 2026 – 3 April 2026
- Constituency: Hpa-An № 2

Member of the Amyotha Hluttaw
- In office 1 February 2016 – 1 February 2021
- Constituency: Kayin State № 6
- In office 31 January 2011 – 28 January 2016
- Constituency: Kayin State № 6

Personal details
- Born: 12 October 1969 (age 56) Hpa-An, Myanmar
- Party: Union Solidarity and Development Party
- Parent(s): Saw Boe Ni (father); Nan Kyi Aye (mother)
- Education: Hap-an College; Mawlamyine University; University of Computer Studies, Yangon
- Occupation: Politician

Nan Ni Ni Aye (Burmese: နန်းနီနီအေး; born 12 October 1969) is a Burmese politician and former educator who has served as the fourth Second Vice President of Myanmar since April 2026. A member of the Union Solidarity and Development Party (USDP), she previously served in the Amyotha Hluttaw as the representative for Kayin State Constituency No. 6 for two consecutive terms.

== Early life and education ==
Nan Ni Ni Aye was born on 12 October 1969 in Hpa-an, Kayin State. Her father, Saw Boe Ni, was also a member of parliament from Kayin State during the era of the Revolutionary Council. She studied zoology at Hap-an College and Mawlamyine University and later pursued a master's degree in information science at the University of Computer Studies, Yangon. Before entering politics, she served as a state school teacher and later as an assistant lecturer at her alma mater, the computer university, for a total of 17 years in public service.

== Political career ==
After the 2010 general election, Nan Ni Ni Aye became an MP in the Amyotha Hluttaw (Upper House) for Kayin State Constituency No. 6, which comprised Hpapun Township, a position to which she was re-elected in the 2015 general election. She is the chair of the Union Solidarity and Development Party in Kayin State, and was a member of the Amyotha Hluttaw's Bill Committee for two terms. She competed for the Kayin State Hluttaw in the 2020 general election but lost; however, she won a seat in the 2025–26 general election for the State Hluttaw for Hpa-an Constituency No. 2 as a proportional representative.

On 30 March 2026, Nan Ni Ni Aye was nominated for the vice presidency by the Amyotha Hluttaw and was elected on 31 March with 117 votes. At the presidential election held at the Pyidaungsu Hluttaw on 3 April 2026, she was elected as the second vice-president—after Min Aung Hlaing and Nyo Saw became the president and the first vice-president respectively— the first woman to hold the office in the country's history.

Political offices
Preceded by Henry Van Thio	Second Vice President of Myanmar; 2026–present	Incumbent
