= Henry Van Thio =

Former Vice-president of Myanmar

His Excellency Henry Van Thio
- ဟင်နရီဗန်ထီးယူ
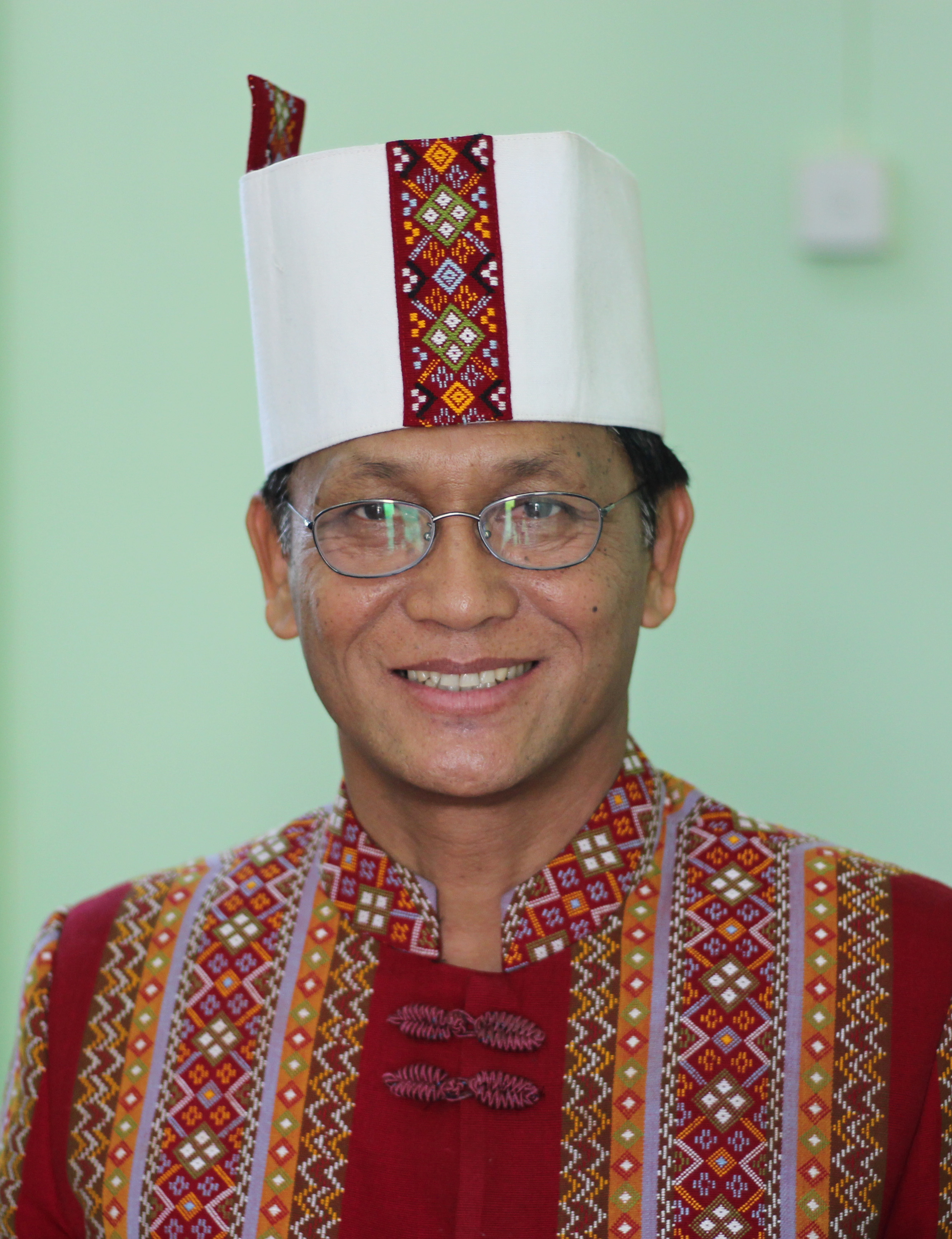
- Henry Van Thio in 2016

3rd Second Vice President of Myanmar
- In office 30 March 2016 – 22 April 2024 Serving with Myint Swe
- President: See list: Htin Kyaw Myint Swe (acting) Win Myint Myint Swe (acting)
- Prime Minister: Min Aung Hlaing (2021–2024)
- State Counsellor: Aung San Suu Kyi (2016–2021)
- Preceded by: Nyan Tun
- Succeeded by: Nan Ni Ni Aye

Amyotha Hluttaw member of parliament for Chin State № 3 constituency
- In office 3 February 2016 – 30 March 2016

Personal details
- Born: 9 August 1958 (age 68) Thantlang Township, Myanmar
- Party: National League for Democracy (until 2023)
- Spouse: Anna Sui Hluan
- Children: 3
- Education: Mandalay University; Rangoon Arts and Science University

Military service
- Allegiance: Myanmar
- Branch/service: Myanmar Army
- Rank: Major

Henry Van Thio (Burmese: ဟင်နရီဗန်ထီးယူ, MLCTS: hang na.ri banhti: yu; born 9 August 1958) is a Burmese politician who was the second vice president of Myanmar from 30 March 2016 to 22 April 2024. He previously served as a member of Amyotha Hluttaw (House of Nationalities). In the 2015 election, he contested and won the Chin State No. 3 constituency for a seat in the country's upper house.

After the February 2021 coup d'état, Van Thio was believed to have been placed under house arrest by the military junta whilst continuing to be recognized as vice president. Van Thio was announced by the junta to have resigned as vice president for "health reasons" on 22 April 2024.

== Early life and military career ==
Henry Van Thio is an ethnic Chin who graduated with a Bachelor of Arts in geography from Mandalay Arts and Science University, with a graduate diploma in law from Rangoon Arts and Science University. He previously served as a major in the Burmese Army.

== Vice presidency ==
On 10 March 2016, he was nominated as one of the vice presidents of Myanmar by National League for Democracy.

On 11 March 2016, 148 MPs nominated him as one of the vice presidents of Myanmar from the House of Nationalities and on 15 March 2016, he received 79 votes out of 352 in the Assembly of the Union, becoming the Second Vice President of Myanmar. He was sworn in on 30 March 2016.

After the 2021 Myanmar coup d'état on 1 February, Van Thio was believed by analysts to have been placed under house arrest by the military junta whilst still being recognized as vice president under the Constitution of Myanmar. Since the coup, he has missed several meetings of the National Defence and Security Council, during which the council extended the military junta's rule. In January 2023, he was allegedly hospitalised after falling at home. He made his first public appearance at the National Defence and Security Council Meeting on 31 July. On 9 August, the NLD released a press statement expelling Van Thio from the party.

== Personal life ==
He is married to Anna Shwe Lwan (also spelled Anna Sui Hluan) and has three children. When his wife gained a scholarship to study theology at the University of Otago, the family moved to New Zealand to live in the Dunedin suburb of North East Valley in 2011. He supported the family through casual work, like picking fruit in Nelson and shift work at the freezing works at Finegand, near Balclutha. The family returned to Myanmar in early 2015.

He is a devout Christian, making him the first non-Buddhist to hold the office of the Vice President of Myanmar. He is a member of the United Pentecostal Church International.

Political offices
Preceded by Nyan Tun	Second Vice President of Myanmar; 2016–2024	Succeeded by Nan Ni Ni Aye
