= Htin Kyaw =

President of Myanmar from 2016 to 2018

- ထင်ကျော်
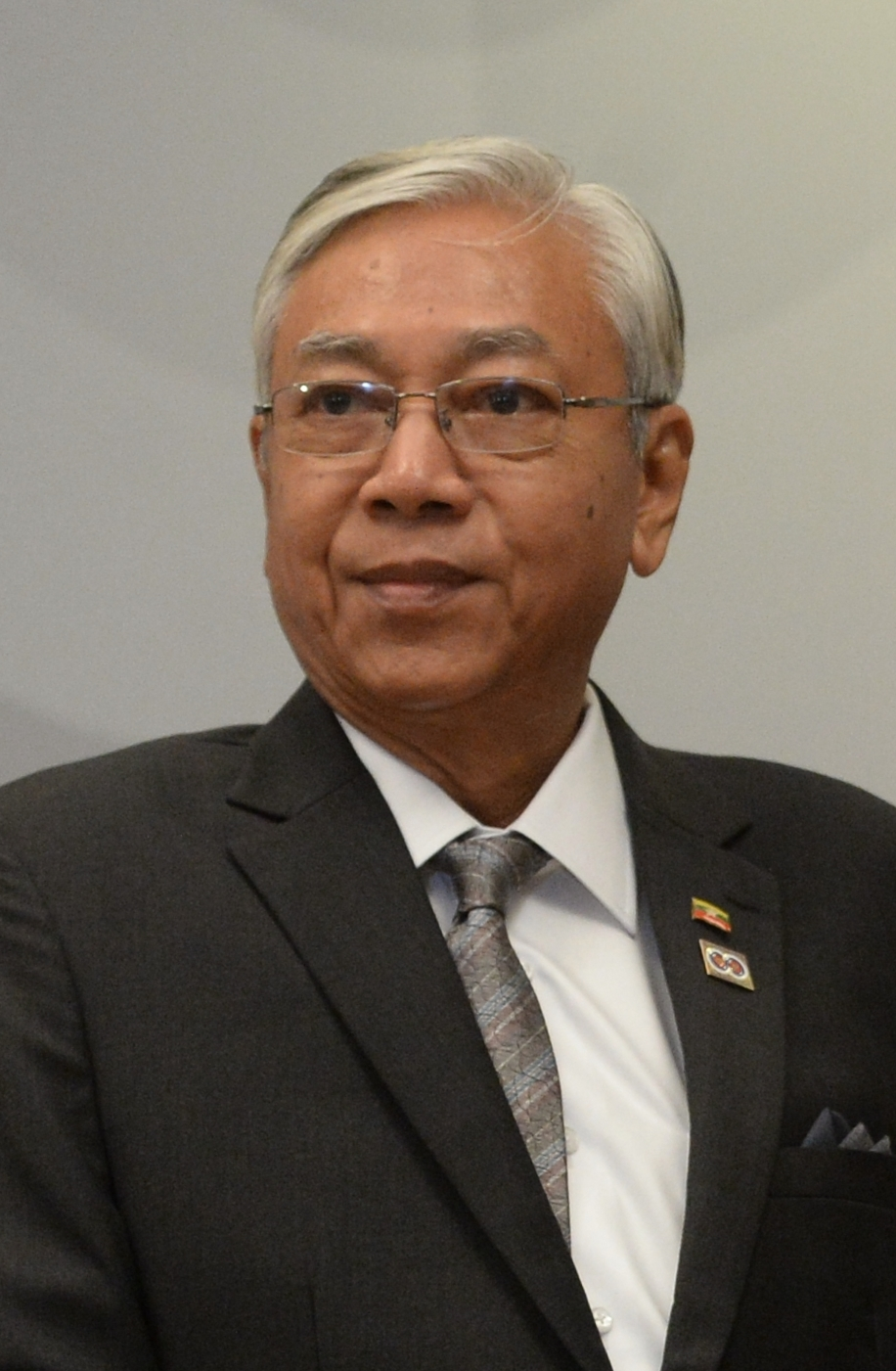
- Htin Kyaw in 2016

9th President of Myanmar
- In office 30 March 2016 – 21 March 2018
- State Counsellor: Aung San Suu Kyi
- Vice President: First Vice President; Myint Swe; Second Vice President; Henry Van Thio
- Preceded by: Thein Sein
- Succeeded by: Win Myint (Note: Myint Swe served as acting president between Htin Kyaw's resignation and Win Myint's inauguration.)

Personal details
- Born: 20 July 1946 (age 80) Rangoon, British Burma (now Yangon, Myanmar)
- Party: NLD
- Spouse: Su Su Lwin (m. 1973)
- Parent(s): Min Thu Wun (father); Kyi Kyi (mother)
- Education: Yangon Institute of Economics; University of London; Hult International Business School
- Website: Government website

Htin Kyaw (Burmese: ထင်ကျော်, pronounced [tʰɪ̀ɴ tɕɔ̀] or [tʰɪ̀ɴ dʑɔ̀]; born 20 July 1946) is a Burmese politician, writer and scholar who served as the ninth president of Myanmar from 2016 until his resignation in 2018. He was the first elected president to hold the office with no ties to the military since the 1962 coup d'état. The second son of scholar Min Thu Wun, Htin Kyaw had held various positions in the education, planning and treasury ministries in prior governments.

The ethnic Mon-Bamar politician is viewed as an important ally of the National League for Democracy (NLD) leader and State Counsellor Aung San Suu Kyi, who is constitutionally barred from the presidency.

== Early life and education ==
Htin Kyaw was born in Rangoon, British Burma (now Yangon, Myanmar), to the late Burmese scholar and poet Min Thu Wun and Kyi Kyi. His father was of Mon descent. His childhood name given by his father was Dala Ban, a royal name of ancient Mon commanders. (He later used it as his pen name).

Htin Kyaw completed his high school education at the English Methodist High School in 1962. He enrolled at the Rangoon Institute of Economics (then part of Rangoon Arts and Science University) and graduated with an M.Econ. in statistics in 1968. He started working as a tutor while studying towards his master's degree. He then moved to the University Computer Centre as a programmer/system analyst in 1970.

Htin Kyaw pursued further studies on a scholarship to the Institute of Computer Science, University of London in 1971–1972 and attended computer studies in Asia Electronics Union, Tokyo in 1974. He completed his second master's degree in 1975. He attended the Hult International Business School (then known as the Arthur D. Little School of Management), in Cambridge, Massachusetts, in 1987.

== Career ==
In 1975, Htin Kyaw joined the Ministry of Industry 2 as a Deputy Division Chief. In 1980, he was appointed as a deputy director in the Foreign Economic Relations Department, Ministry of Planning and Finance, and resigned from government service in 1992.

He was arrested on 22 September 2000, and spent four months in Insein prison for assisting Aung San Suu Kyi's trip outside Yangon. From 2012, he worked as a senior executive for Daw Khin Kyi Foundation, founded by Aung San Suu Kyi and named after her mother Khin Kyi. Though not a veteran member of the NLD, Kyaw worked very closely with Aung San Suu Kyi at the Office of NLD Chairperson.

He was mentioned as a possible presidential pick after the NLD won a sweeping victory in the 2015 general election. Aung San Suu Kyi was constitutionally barred from the presidency, since her late husband and both of her children are British citizens; the constitution does not allow a president, his parents, his spouse, or his children to "owe allegiance to a foreign power." Upon his nomination, Aung San Suu Kyi said she had chosen him for his truthfulness, loyalty and respectable education.

== Presidency ==
On 10 March 2016, he was nominated as one of the Vice Presidents of Myanmar by the NLD for the House of Representatives (Lower House). On 11 March 2016, 274 MPs out of 317 (during Elected MPs assembly) voted him as one of the vice presidents. On 15 March 2016, 360 MPs out of 652 of the Assembly of the Union (Union Parliament) voted him as the president, ahead of Myint Swe and his party colleague Henry Van Thio. He thus became the first civilian elected president in 53 years.

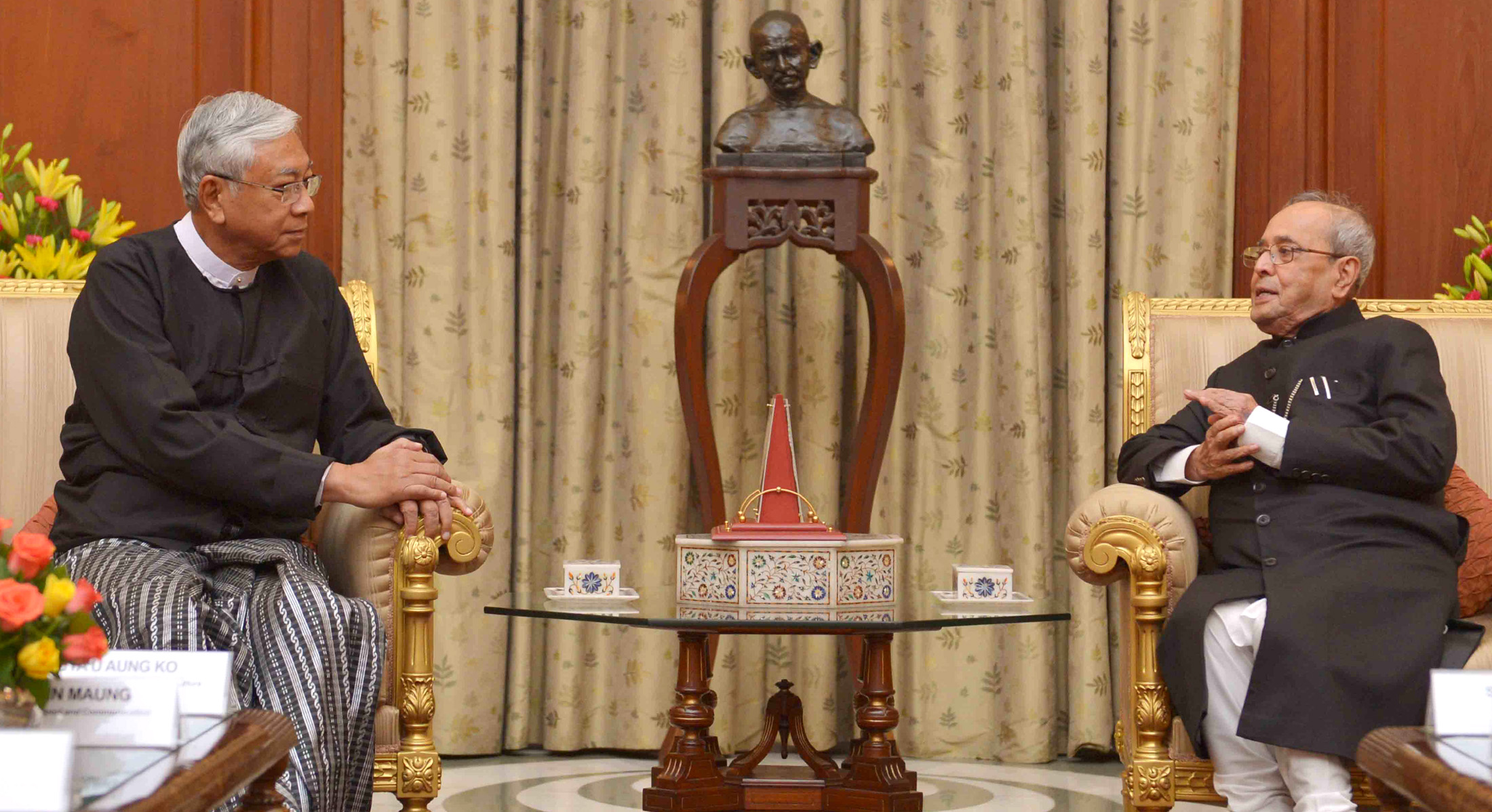
Htin Kyaw and Pranab Mukherjee in New Delhi

On 17 March 2016, Htin Kyaw proposed a cabinet of 21 ministries. On 21 March 2016, he delivered a speech in the Assembly of the Union for the first time regarding the proposal of the formation of ministries and the MPs of the Union Parliament approved it.

On 30 March 2016, Htin Kyaw was sworn in as President of Myanmar, becoming the first president since U Nu's overthrow in 1962 to have no ties to the military. Despite Htin Kyaw being a nominally independent leader, Aung San Suu Kyi said that she would in fact direct the actions of the president and lead the country through him. It was thought before the elections that Aung San Suu Kyi would "be above the president” and make all key decisions. Indeed, the post of State Counsellor–equivalent to a prime minister–was created for her.

On 21 March 2018, amid speculations of ill health, it was suddenly announced that Htin Kyaw had resigned from his position as president, citing health issues and the 'need for rest'. Myint Swe, first vice president of Myanmar, succeeded Htin Kyaw as president under the constitution of Myanmar, which also called for a new president to be selected by the Pyidaungsu Hluttaw within seven days of Htin Kyaw's resignation.

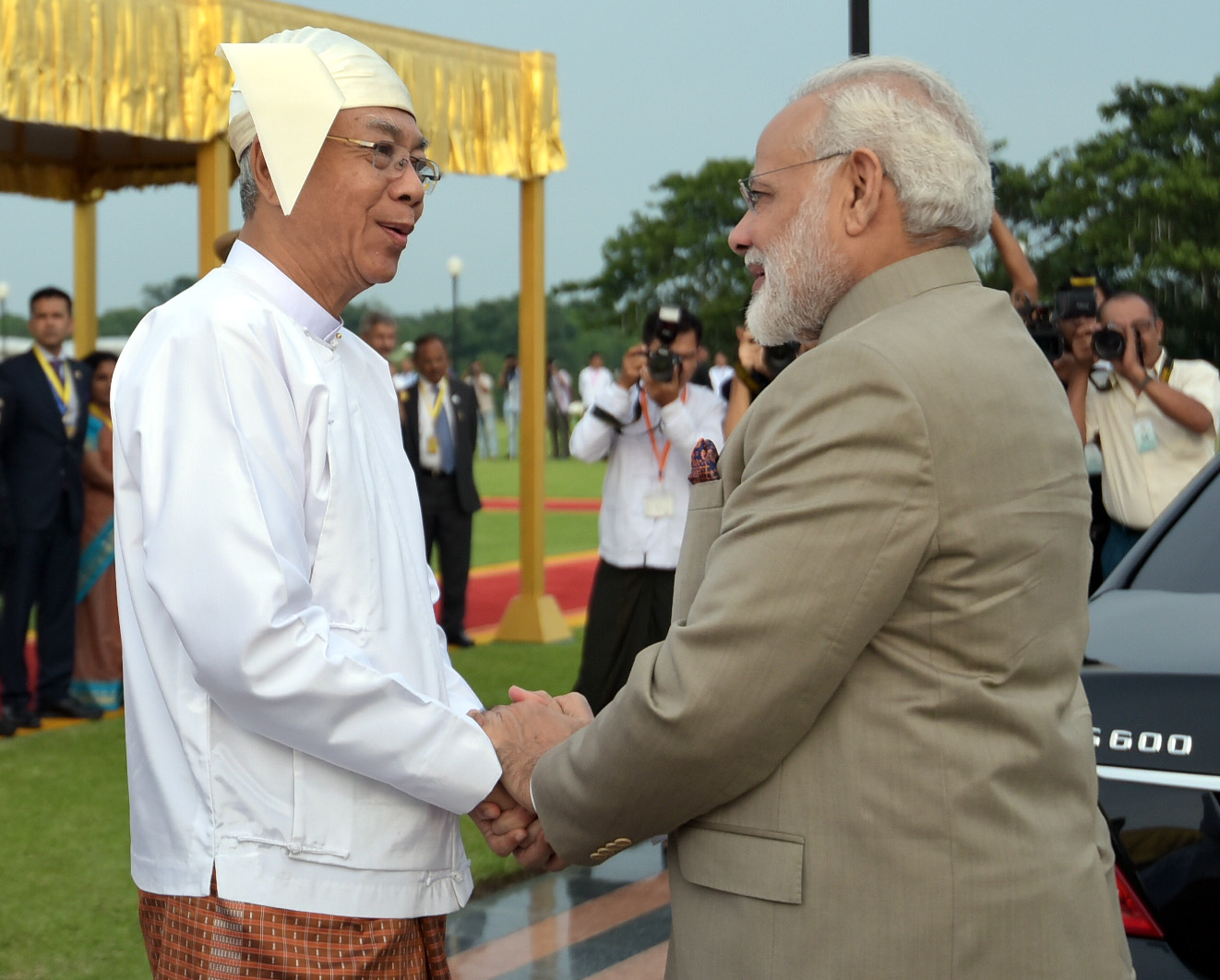
Htin Kyaw and Narendra Modi in Presidential Palace

== Post-presidency ==
On 14 February 2025, a court in Argentina, acting on a petition from the Burmese Rohingya Organisation UK and citing the principle of universal jurisdiction, issued arrest warrants against Htin Kyaw and other incumbent and former officials in Myanmar on charges of "genocide and crimes against humanity" against the Rohingyas during Htin Kyaw's presidency.

== Personal life ==
Htin Kyaw has been married to Su Su Lwin since 1973; she is the incumbent House of Representatives MP for Thongwa Township and a member of the International Relations Committee of the House of Representatives. The couple have no children.

His father was the writer, poet and scholar Min Thu Wun, who won a seat in the 1990 election. His father-in-law, U Lwin, was a co-founder of the National League for Democracy. He also acted as the secretary of the party from 1995 to 2010.

== Literary works ==
Htin Kyaw writes under the pen name Dala Ban, a prominent title of ancient Mon commanders. He wrote a biographical book about his father Min Thu Wun: The Father’s Life: Glimpses of my Father (Aba Bawa Aba Akyaung Tase Tasaung). He also wrote various articles about his family life with his father in weekly journals.

== Health problems ==
Htin Kyaw went to Bangkok in September 2017 to have medical examinations taken and to be given necessary treatment. There has been speculations about his ill health among people but they were denied by officials. He departed to Singapore on 23 January 2018 to have a medical check-up.

== Notes ==
Political offices
Preceded by Thein Sein	President of Myanmar; 2016–2018	Succeeded by Win Myint
