= Myint Swe =

Acting President of Myanmar (2018; 2021–2025)

Sado Thiri Thudhamma Myint Swe
- မြင့်ဆွေ
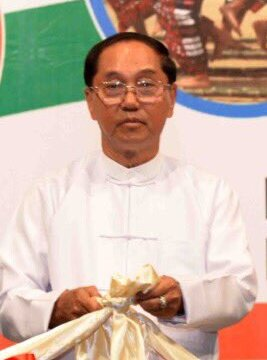
- Myint Swe in 2018

Acting President of Myanmar
- In office 1 February 2021 – 7 August 2025 (Note: Myint Swe took medical leave on 18 June 2024, and temporarily transferred NDSC-related presidential duties to Min Aung Hlaing (the chairman of the State Administration Council) on 22 July, for the duration of the medical leave, with Myint Swe remaining in office. Myint Swe died in office on 7 August 2025.)
- Prime Minister: Min Aung Hlaing
- Vice President: First Vice President; Himself; Second Vice President; Henry Van Thio
- Preceded by: Win Myint
- Succeeded by: Min Aung Hlaing
- In office 21 March 2018 – 30 March 2018
- State Counsellor: Aung San Suu Kyi
- Vice President: First Vice President; Himself; Second Vice President; Henry Van Thio
- Preceded by: Htin Kyaw
- Succeeded by: Win Myint

3rd First Vice President of Myanmar
- In office 30 March 2016 – 7 August 2025 Serving with Henry Van Thio (2016–2024)
- President: Htin Kyaw; Himself (acting); Win Myint; Himself (acting); Min Aung Hlaing (Pro Tem)
- Preceded by: Sai Mauk Kham
- Succeeded by: Nyo Saw

1st Chief Minister of Yangon Region
- In office 30 March 2011 – 30 March 2016
- Preceded by: Office established
- Succeeded by: Phyo Min Thein

Personal details
- Born: 24 June 1951 Mandalay, Union of Burma
- Died: 7 August 2025 (aged 74) Naypidaw, Myanmar
- Party: USDP
- Spouse: Khin Thet Htay
- Children: 2
- Education: Defence Services Academy
- Awards: Sado Thiri Thudhamma

Military service
- Allegiance: Myanmar
- Branch/service: Tatmadaw; Myanmar Army
- Years of service: 1969–2010
- Rank: Lieutenant general

Myint Swe (Note: Burmese: မြင့်ဆွေ; pronounced [mjɪ̰ɰ̃ sʰwè]) (24 June 1951 – 7 August 2025) was a Burmese politician and army officer who served as the third first vice president of Myanmar from 2016 until his death in 2025. A member of the Union Solidarity and Development Party (USDP), Myint Swe served as acting president of Myanmar in 2018 and again from 2021 to 2025. (Note: Myint Swe has assumed the acting presidency twice: the first time between the resignation of Htin Kyaw on 21 March 2018 and the election of Win Myint on 30 March, and the second time between the depositon of Win Myint following the 2021 coup d'état until his death in 2025.)

Myint Swe was installed as acting president by the Tatmadaw through a coup d'état on 1 February 2021, after which he immediately declared a state of emergency and formally transferred power to coup leader Min Aung Hlaing. Throughout his political career, Myint Swe worked to ensure the Tatmadaw's influence in politics. He was rarely seen in public after the coup, with Min Aung Hlaing serving as the face of the government. Myint Swe's main role in the military government was to formally grant and renew Min Aung Hlaing's emergency powers.

== Military career ==
Myint Swe graduated from the Defence Services Academy in 1973 as part of the 15th intake. He became a brigadier general and commander of Light Infantry Division 11 in 1997. He was appointed Commander of Southeastern Command and member of State Peace and Development Council in 2001. He was transferred as Commander of Yangon Command and promoted to major general. He also acted as Chairman of Yangon Division Peace and Development Council. He became the Chief of Military Security Affairs after General Khin Nyunt was purged in 2004. He became Chief of Bureau of Special Operations – 5 (BSO-5) in January 2006. He was the first ethnic Mon to be promoted to the rank of Lieutenant General in 2005. He was promoted to Quartermaster General and was rumored to be the next in line to replace Vice-Senior General Maung Aye in 2009.

He executed 3 major events while he was commanding the Yangon Command, arresting family members of General Ne Win in 2002 after an alleged coup conspiracy was uncovered, arresting Khin Nyunt and his associates in 2004, in the purge of the Military Intelligence faction and crushing the Saffron Revolution in 2007. His actions after Cyclone Nargis were criticized. He dealt with activists harshly in the pre-2010 general election period.

== Political career ==
=== Chief Minister of Yangon Region ===
Myint was nominated as chief-minister of the Yangon Region after the general election by President Thein Sein. He was tipped to be nominated to become Vice President of Burma after Tin Aung Myint Oo's resignation in 2012, but did not qualify per the Constitution of Burma, as his son-in-law was an Australian citizen at the time.

=== Vice Presidency ===
On 11 March 2016, military-appointed MPs of the Assembly of the Union nominated him as one of the Vice Presidents of Myanmar. He received 213 votes on 15 March 2016 and became First Vice President of Htin Kyaw's Cabinet. He was sworn in on 30 March 2016.

=== Acting President ===
On 21 March 2018, following the sudden resignation of Htin Kyaw as President of Myanmar, Myint Swe was sworn in as acting president under the Constitution of Myanmar, which also called for the Assembly to select a new president within seven days of Htin Kyaw's resignation.

On 1 February 2021, President Win Myint was removed from office in a coup and detained by the Tatmadaw (Myanmar's military), so Myint Swe would become Acting President, allowing him to call a meeting of the military-controlled National Defence and Security Council (NDSC) and declare a state of emergency and formally transfer power to coup leader Min Aung Hlaing. The military maintains that Myint Swe constitutionally assumed the presidency because the constitution states the first vice president becomes acting president if the presidency becomes vacant due to "resignation, death, permanent disability or any other cause". However, according to the International Institute for Democracy and Electoral Assistance, this interpretation is questionable as the military had no legal authority to detain Win Myint and the constitution provides for an impeachment and removal process which was not followed.

Myint extended the state of emergency five times by six month periods at meetings of the NSDC, but did not otherwise participate in government. The third extension was especially controversial because the constitution says up to two extensions are "normally" allowed. According to some international observers such as the International Crisis Group, the third extension was unconstitutional. Myint Swe justified the extension due to what he said are "extraordinary circumstances". The junta-packed Constitutional Tribunal affirmed his interpretation.

In a November 2023 meeting of the NSDC, Myint Swe warned that the country was at risk of being "split into various parts" amid the civil war.

On 18 July 2024, state media in Myanmar reported that Myint Swe was suffering from neurological disorders and peripheral neuropathy disease, adding that he had been receiving medical treatment since early in 2024 and was unable to eat or carry out other basic functions. On 22 July 2024, he took medical leave and temporarily transferred his NDSC-related duties as president to Min Aung Hlaing on an acting basis, while remaining in office.

== Personal life and death ==
Born on 24 June 1951 in Mandalay, Myint Swe was of Mon descent. He was married to Khin Thet Htay, and had two children.

On 7 August 2025, Myint Swe died at a military hospital in Naypyitaw, following a long illness involving neurological disorders and peripheral neuropathy. He was 74. The government announced that he would be accorded a state funeral and that five days of national mourning from 7 to 11 August would be observed.

Political offices
New office	Chief Minister of Yangon Region; 2011–2016	Succeeded by Phyo Min Thein
Preceded by Sai Mauk Kham	First Vice President of Myanmar; 2016–2025	Succeeded by Nyo Saw
Preceded by Htin Kyaw	Acting President of Myanmar; 2018	Succeeded by Win Myint
Preceded by Win Myint	Acting President of Myanmar; 2021–2025	Succeeded by Min Aung Hlaing
