= State Counsellor of Myanmar =

2016–2021 de facto head of government of Myanmar

- မြန်မာနိုင်ငံတော် အတိုင်ပင်ခံပုဂ္ဂိုလ်

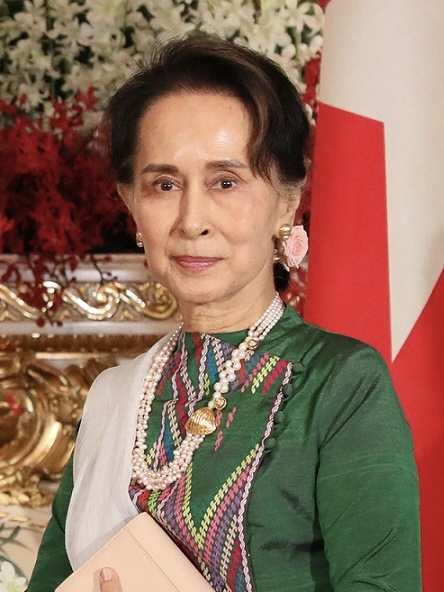
- Only officeholder Aung San Suu Kyi; 6 April 2016 – 1 February 2021
- Style: His/Her Excellency (formal); State Counsellor (informal)
- Type: Head of government (de facto)
- Status: Office abolished
- Seat: Naypyidaw
- Nominator: Assembly of the Union
- Appointer: President
- Term length: Equivalent to incumbent President (5 years, renewable once)
- Inaugural holder: Aung San Suu Kyi
- Formation: 6 April 2016
- Abolished: 1 February 2021
- Superseded by: Chairman of the State Administration Council
- Website: www.statecounsellor.gov.mm

The State Counsellor of Myanmar (Burmese: နိုင်ငံတော်၏ အတိုင်ပင်ခံပုဂ္ဂိုလ်) was the de facto head of government of Myanmar, equivalent to a prime minister, from 2016 to 2021. The office was created in 2016 after Aung San Suu Kyi's National League for Democracy won the 2015 Myanmar general election so she could lead the government despite being constitutionally ineligible for the presidency. The officeholder could “contact ministries, departments, organizations, associations and individuals” in an official capacity, while being accountable to parliament. The office was abolished by Aung San Suu Kyi's political adversary, Commander-in-Chief of Defence Services Min Aung Hlaing, after he seized power from her in a 2021 military coup d'état.

== Background ==
Constitutionally, the post was created on 6 April 2016 to allow for a greater role for Aung San Suu Kyi within the Government of Myanmar. Aung San Suu Kyi's National League for Democracy won a landslide victory in the 2015 Myanmar general election; however she is constitutionally barred from becoming President of Myanmar as her late husband Michael Aris was British and her two children also hold British nationality.

The bill to create the post was passed by the upper house of the Assembly of the Union on 1 April 2016 and by the lower house on 5 April 2016, and signed by President Htin Kyaw on 6 April 2016. The law explicitly references Aung San Suu Kyi, and references several priorities, including cultivation of a multi-party democratic system, proper implementation of a market economy system, establishment of a federal union, and establishment of domestic peace and development.

== Roles and responsibilities ==
The post was similar to that of a prime minister in that it allowed the holder to work across all areas of government and to act as a link between the executive and legislative branches. The State Counsellor had a term of five years, the same term as that of the president.

== List of state counsellors ==
Portrait	Name (Born–Died)	Term of Office			Political Party	Cabinet		President	Assembly
Portrait	Name (Born–Died)	Term start	Term end	Term in office	Political Party	Cabinet		President	Assembly
	Aung San Suu Kyi (born 1945)	6 April 2016	1 February 2021	4 years, 301 days	National League for Democracy	II	NLD—Mil.	Htin Kyaw, Win Myint	2 (2015)
	Aung San Suu Kyi (born 1945)	Prior to being removed from office in a coup d'état on 1 February 2021, Aung San Suu Kyi concurrently served as the Minister for Foreign Affairs and for the Office of the President as well as leader of the majority party, the National League for Democracy.							

== State Counsellorship of Aung San Suu Kyi ==
State Counsellorship of Aung San Suu Kyi (2016–2021)
Category	Key Initiatives & Achievements
Diplomacy	Led Myanmar's re-engagement with the West, including a major visit to the United States in 2016 to meet with Barack Obama, resulting in the lifting of key U.S. sanctions.; Represented Myanmar at ASEAN summits, including the 37th ASEAN Summit and ASEAN Plus Three meetings, promoting regional cooperation.; Facilitated Myanmar's participation in global forums such as the United Nations.; Aung San Suu Kyi's meeting with US President Barack Obama in 2016
Economic Reform	Championed a transition toward a market economy, introducing policies to liberalize sectors such as banking and telecommunications.; Focused on attracting foreign investment, including from China and Japan, boosting the country's economy after years of isolation.; Supported economic development through infrastructure projects, such as the Myanmar–China Pipeline and Special Economic Zones.
Education & Youth	Founded the Daw Khin Kyi Foundation, which operates educational and vocational training programs, especially for marginalized communities.; Promoted youth development by expanding access to education, particularly in rural areas.; Served as Head of the Myanmar Scout Federation, an organization fostering leadership and civic engagement among youth.
Ethnic Relations	Led the 21st Century Panglong Conference, aimed at achieving peace and reconciliation with ethnic armed groups.; Emphasized a federal system of governance and greater autonomy for ethnic minorities within the framework of Myanmar's constitution.; Participated in state-level ethnic cultural events to promote unity and peace, including the Rakhine State peace-building efforts.; Aung San Suu Kyi's arrival in the US for foreign diplomacy
International Standing	Defended Myanmar at the International Court of Justice (ICJ) in 2019, responding to allegations of genocide against the Rohingya people.; Despite international criticism, she retained considerable domestic political support, bolstering Myanmar's international influence.; Aung San Suu Kyi's joint media briefing with India Prime Minister Narendra Modi in 2017

== See also ==
- Politics of Myanmar
- President of Myanmar
- Vice President of Myanmar
- Prime Minister of Myanmar
- Ministry of State Counsellor’s Office
- Chairman of the State Administration Council
