= Vice President of Myanmar =

Deputy head of state of Myanmar

Vice Presidents of the Republic of the Union of Myanmar
- ပြည်ထောင်စုသမ္မတမြန်မာနိုင်ငံတော် ဒုတိယသမ္မတများ
- State Seal of Myanmar

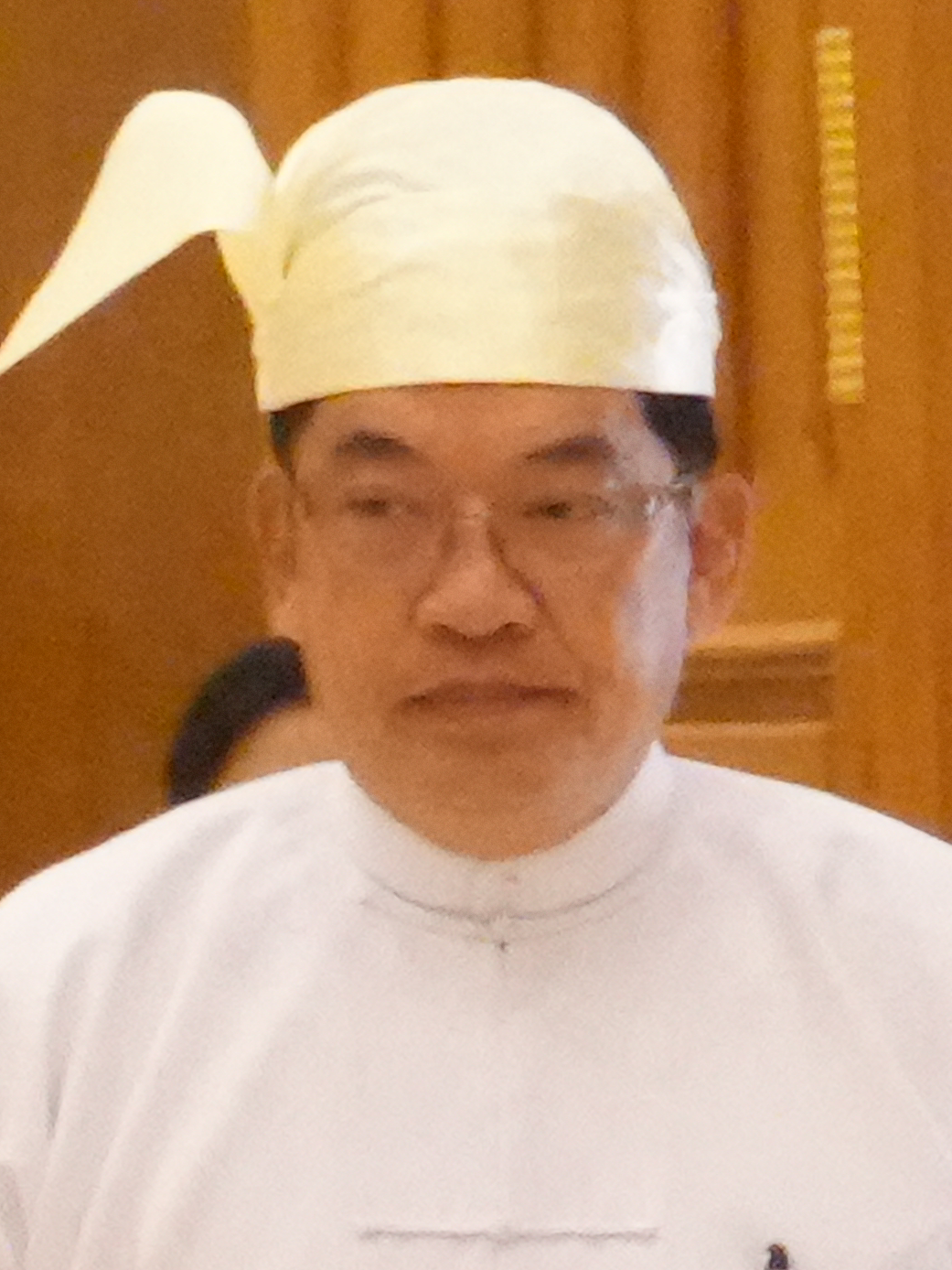
Nyo Saw

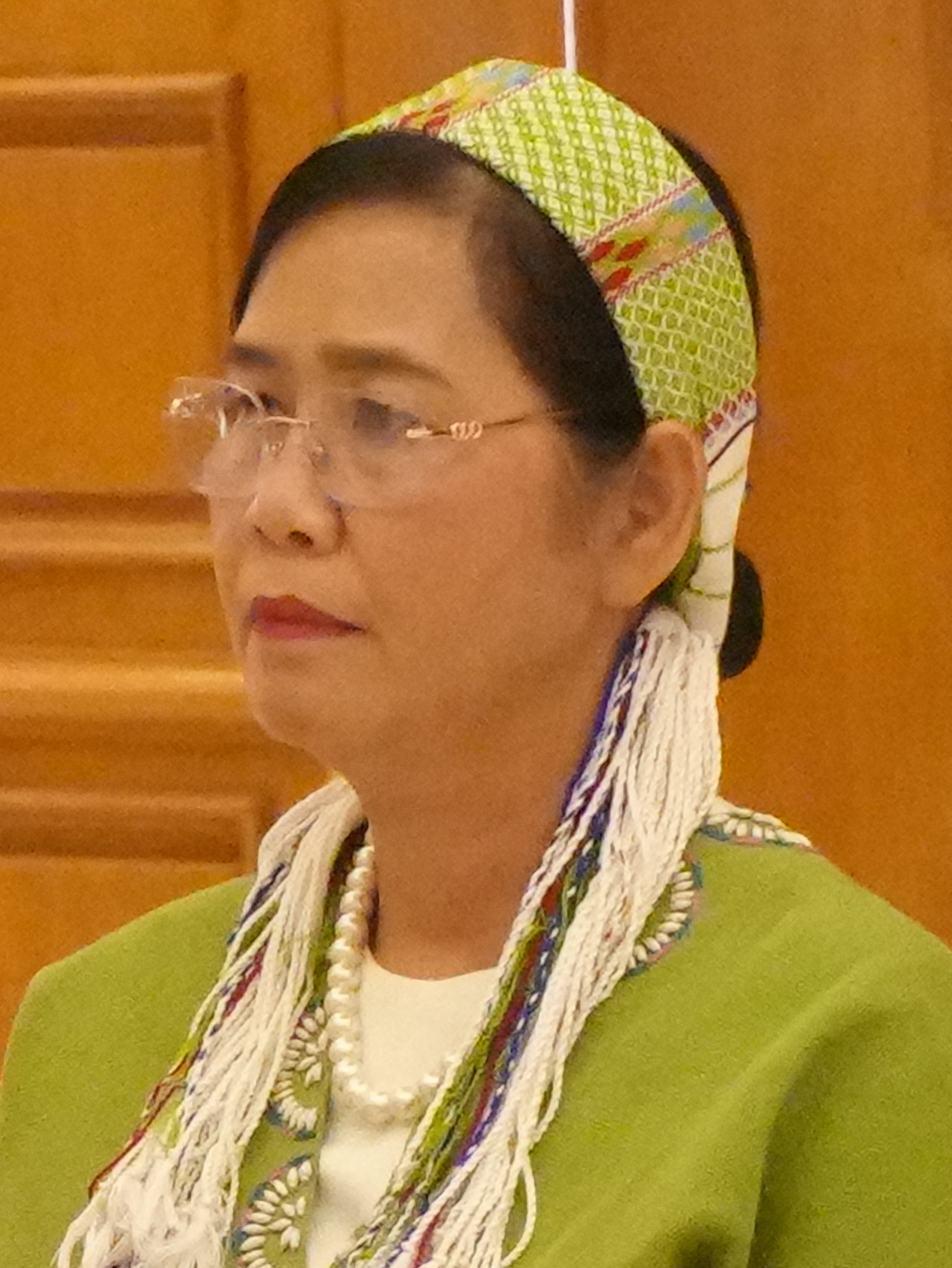
Nan Ni Ni Aye
Incumbents
Nyo Saw
Nan Ni Ni Aye
since 10 April 2026
- Style: His Excellency (formal)
- Member of: Cabinet; National Defence and Security Council
- Residence: Presidential Palace
- Seat: Naypyidaw
- Nominator: Assembly of the Union
- Appointer: Presidential Electoral College
- Term length: Five years, renewable once
- Constituting instrument: Constitution of Myanmar
- First holder: Tin Aung Myint Oo; Sai Mauk Kham
- Salary: K4 million / month

The vice presidents of Myanmar are the second highest-ranking posts in the government of the Republic of the Union of Myanmar. The offices were established by the 2008 Myanmar constitution and rank directly below the president. The offices came into effect on 30 March 2011, when the new government assumed de jure power and essentially function in the same manner as any other deputy head of state. There are two vice-presidential posts in the government, but no distinction is officially made between them. It can be assumed that the posts follow the order of seniority, much like the ones practised by the Vice Premier of the People's Republic of China.

The 2008 Constitution establishes that the President and Vice-Presidents are elected by the Pyidaungsu Hluttaw. The way they are elected are as follows:

- The elected members of the Amyotha Hluttaw nominate one person.
- The elected members of the Pyithu Hluttaw nominate one person.
- The combined bloc of military personnel from both houses nominate one person.
- Then, in a full, joint session of the Pyidaungsu Hluttaw, the person with the highest number of votes is elected President.
- The two other persons become Vice-Presidents.

== List of officeholders ==
=== Vice-presidents in Socialist Republic of the Union of Burma ===
The position of vice president of Socialist Republic of the Union of Burma was created in 1985 by two changes in the Constitution of Burma and in the basic law of the Burma Socialist Programme Party.

Portrait	Name (Birth–Death)	Term of office			Political party	President(s)	Notes
Portrait	Name (Birth–Death)	Took office	Left office	Time in office	Political party	President(s)	Notes
	Aye Ko (1921–2006)	December 1985	27 July 1988	2 years, 9 months	Burma Socialist Programme Party	San Yu	
	Aye Ko (1921–2006)	27 July 1988	12 August 1988	2 years, 9 months	Burma Socialist Programme Party	Sein Lwin	
	Aye Ko (1921–2006)	19 August 1988	18 September 1988	2 years, 9 months	Burma Socialist Programme Party	Maung Maung	

=== First vice-presidents after 2011 ===
Portrait	Name (Birth–Death)	Term of office			Political party	President(s)
Portrait	Name (Birth–Death)	Took office	Left office	Time in office	Political party	President(s)
	Tin Aung Myint Oo (born 1949)	30 March 2011	1 July 2012 (resigned)	1 year, 93 days	Union Solidarity and Development Party	Thein Sein
	Sai Mauk Kham (born 1949)	1 July 2012	30 March 2016	3 years, 273 days	Union Solidarity and Development Party	Thein Sein
	Myint Swe (1951–2025)	30 March 2016	7 August 2025 (died in office)	9 years, 130 days	Union Solidarity and Development Party	Htin Kyaw
	Myint Swe (1951–2025)	30 March 2016	7 August 2025 (died in office)	9 years, 130 days	Union Solidarity and Development Party	Himself
	Myint Swe (1951–2025)	30 March 2016	7 August 2025 (died in office)	9 years, 130 days	Union Solidarity and Development Party	Win Myint
	Myint Swe (1951–2025)	30 March 2016	7 August 2025 (died in office)	9 years, 130 days	Union Solidarity and Development Party	Himself
	Nyo Saw (born unknown)	10 April 2026	Incumbent	175 days	Union Solidarity and Development Party	Min Aung Hlaing

=== Second vice-presidents after 2011 ===
Portrait	Name (Birth–Death)	Term of office			Political party	President(s)
Portrait	Name (Birth–Death)	Took office	Left office	Time in office	Political party	President(s)
	Sai Mauk Kham (born 1949)	30 March 2011	1 July 2012	1 year, 93 days	Union Solidarity and Development Party	Thein Sein
	Nyan Tun (born 1954)	15 August 2012	30 March 2016	3 years, 228 days	Union Solidarity and Development Party	Thein Sein
	Henry Van Thio (born 1959)	30 March 2016	28 March 2023 (Note: Union Election Commission banned NLD)	8 years, 23 days	National League for Democracy	Htin Kyaw
	Henry Van Thio (born 1959)	30 March 2016	28 March 2023	8 years, 23 days	National League for Democracy	Myint Swe
	Henry Van Thio (born 1959)	30 March 2016	28 March 2023	8 years, 23 days	National League for Democracy	Win Myint
	Henry Van Thio (born 1959)	28 March 2023	22 April 2024 (resigned)	8 years, 23 days	Independent	Myint Swe
	Nan Ni Ni Aye (born 1969)	10 April 2026	Incumbent	175 days	Union Solidarity and Development Party	Min Aung Hlaing

== See also ==
- Myanmar
  - Politics of Myanmar
  - List of colonial governors of Burma
  - President of Myanmar
  - List of heads of state of Myanmar since 1948
  - List of heads of state of Myanmar
  - Prime Minister of Myanmar
  - List of prime ministers of Myanmar
  - State Counsellor of Myanmar
  - Chairman of the State Administration Council
- Lists of office-holders
