= President of Myanmar =

Head of state

President of the Republic of the Union of Myanmar
- ပြည်ထောင်စုသမ္မတမြန်မာနိုင်ငံတော်‌ နိုင်ငံတော်သမ္မတ (Burmese)
- State seal of Myanmar

- Flag of Myanmar

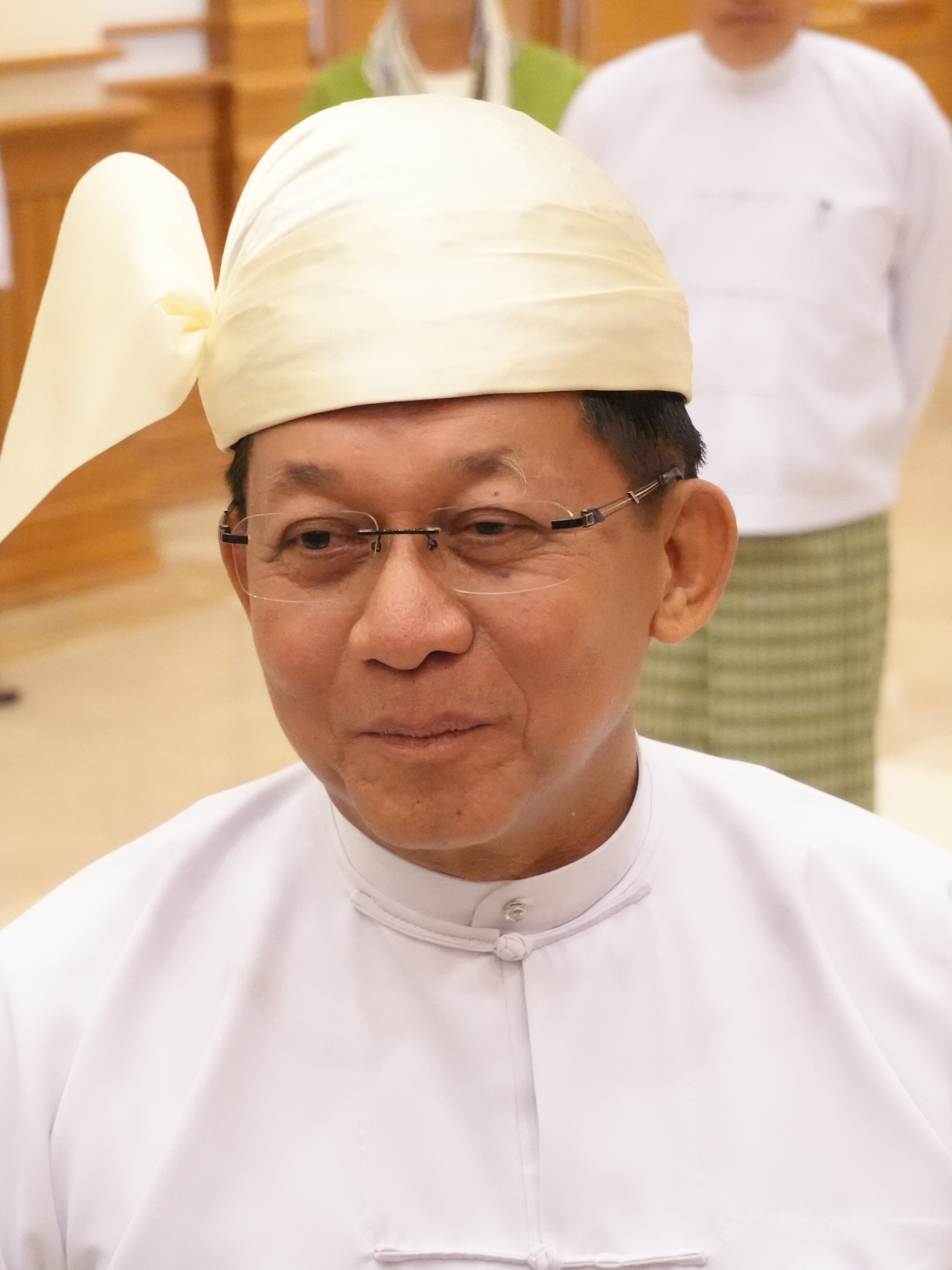
- Incumbent; Min Aung Hlaing since 10 April 2026
- Style: Mr. President (informal); His Excellency (formal)
- Type: Head of state Head of government
- Member of: Union Government; National Defence and Security Council
- Residence: Presidential Palace
- Seat: Naypyidaw
- Nominator: Pyidaungsu Hluttaw
- Appointer: Presidential Electoral College
- Term length: Five years, renewable once
- Constituting instrument: Constitution of Myanmar
- Precursor: Governor of Burma
- Formation: 4 January 1948; 78 years ago
- First holder: Sao Shwe Thaik
- Deputy: Vice president
- Salary: K5 million/US$ 2,385 per month
- Website: Official website

The president of the Republic of the Union of Myanmar (Burmese: နိုင်ငံတော်‌သမ္မတ, MLCTS: nuing ngam tau samma.ta., lit. 'President of the State') is the head of state and head of government of Myanmar. The president chairs the National Defence and Security Council and leads the Union Government (Cabinet), the executive branch of the Myanmar government.

The presidency was established in 1948, when Burma gained its independence from the British Empire. During this period, the president was the ceremonial head of state while prime minister is the actual head of government. The presidency was abolished following the 1962 coup d'etat, when Ne Win assumed the powers of both head of state and head of government as the Chairman of the Revolutionary Council and the Revolutionary Government. The 1974 Constitution reintroduced the presidency, to be held by the Chairman of the Council of State. The 1988 coup d'etat again led to the presidency's abolishment, with the Chairman of the State Law and Order Restoration Council (reconstituted in 1997 as the State Peace and Development Council) assuming the functions of the head of state.

The 2008 Constitution introduced a presidential system, where the president is both the head of state and government. Thein Sein assumed the presidency in 2011. After the 2015 election, the extraconstitutional post of State Counsellor of Myanmar was created for Aung San Suu Kyi, the leader of the majority party, the National League for Democracy, because she was ineligible for the presidency. She served as the de facto head of government until she was deposed in the 2021 coup d'état by Commander-in-Chief of Defence Services Min Aung Hlaing, who created the extraconstitutional posts of chairman of the State Administration Council and prime minister for himself to lead the government.

The president is elected by members of parliament, not by the general population; specifically the Presidential Electoral College, a three-committee body composed of members of parliament, elects the president. Each of the three committees, made up of Amyotha Hluttaw, Pyithu Hluttaw members of parliament, or military-appointed lawmakers, nominates a candidate for presidency. The presidency is the most powerful position in the civilian leadership structure. Even when an elected civilian government is in place, the president has no command authority over the Tatmadaw, and his executive authority is counterbalanced by the significant governance powers of Commander-in-Chief of Defence Services. The current president is Min Aung Hlaing, who assumed office 10 April 2026, having previously exercised the duties of the role from 2024 to 2026. (Note: Myint Swe died in office as Pro Tem President, as stated by state media and independently verified by outlets including The New York Times. Up to that point, Min Aung Hlaing was using the title Pro Tem President (On Duty) when signing legislation by the National Defence and Security Council (NDSC), based on Myint Swe's delegation of authority starting with his medical leave on 22 July 2024. When the NDSC met for the first time after Myint Swe's death, in February 2026, Min Aung Hlaing signed NDSC legislation as Acting President.)

== History ==
The president was only the head of state under previous constitutions but under current constitution, it is both the head of state and head of government. The position of president as a head of state was created in 1948, with the adoption of the Burmese Declaration of Independence from the United Kingdom. Since then, eleven people have officially held the office. The office of the president was abolished twice when direct military rule was imposed by the coups of 1962 and 1988.

In the parliamentary system practised in 1948–1962, the "President" was the ceremonial head of state while prime minister is the actual head of government. The first president of 1948–1952 period was titled "Provisional President" because he had been elected by the Constituent Assembly of Burma, not by the Union Parliament. The first "President" elected by the Union Parliament took office in 1952.

The 1962 coup d'etat abolished both offices of the President and the Prime Minister, and the junta leader assumed the powers of both head of state and head of government as the "Chairman" of "Revolutionary Council" and "Revolutionary Government".

The 1974 Constitution reintroduced the office with the title "President of the Republic", to be ex officio held by the "Chairman of the Council of State". In fact, the chairmanship of the Council of State is the main title of the head of state which was used in promulgation of legislations and orders while the presidency is more like a ceremonial title to represent the country.

Both of these positions were abolished again by the 1988 coup d'etat in which the State Law and Order Restoration Council replaced them. The SLORC was abolished and the junta was reconstituted as the State Peace and Development Council in 1997. During the 1988–2011 period, no president was appointed and the chairman of the junta assumed the position of head of state.

The 2008 Constitution introduced the presidential system, in which the "President" is both the head of state and the head of government. This presidential system was adopted upon the inauguration of former prime minister retired general U Thein Sein as the first president under 2008 Constitution in 2011.

In 2021 coup d'état, the then vice-president assumed the title "Pro Tem (President)", called the National Defence and Security Council and proclaimed a nation-wide state of emergency, transferring the powers of executive, legislative and judiciary to the Commander-in-Chief of Defence Services. In 2024, citing health reason, the "Pro Tem President" transferred his powers related to the National Defence and Security to the Commander-in-Chief of Defence Services who used the title "Pro Tem President (On Duty)" from then onward until early 2026 when he started to use the title Acting President instead. After he was elected as the president, he used both the titles "President-elect" and "Acting President" until he was officially sworn in as the "President".

== Qualifications ==
The Constitution of Myanmar sets the principle qualifications that the candidate must meet to be eligible for the office of the President. in Chapter 1: The President, Part I: The Federation of Myanmar in the Constitution of Myanmar. President has to be:

- A citizen of Myanmar.
- At least 45 years of age.
- Qualified to be elected as member of the Pyidaungsu Hluttaw.

According to the Constitution of Myanmar, the president:

1. shall be loyal to the Union and its citizens;
2. shall be a citizen of Myanmar who was born of both parents who were born in the territory under the jurisdiction of the Union and being Myanmar Nationals;
3. shall be an elected person who has attained at least the age of 45;
4. shall be well acquainted with the affairs of the Union such as political, administrative, economic and military;
5. shall be a person who has resided continuously in the Union for at least 20 years up to the time of his election as President
  (Proviso: An official period of stay in a foreign country with the permission of the Union shall be counted as a residing period in the Union)
6. shall he himself, one of the parents, the spouse, one of the legitimate children or their spouses not owe allegiance to a foreign power, not be subject of a foreign power or citizen of a foreign country. They shall not be persons entitled to enjoy the rights and privileges of a subject of a foreign government or citizen of a foreign country;
7. shall possess prescribed qualifications of the President, in addition to qualifications prescribed to stand for election to the Hluttaw.

Moreover, upon taking oath in office, the president is constitutionally forbidden from taking part in any political party activities (Chapter III, 64).

== Powers and duties ==
Under the 2011 Constitution of Myanmar, the president is given the powers:

- To grant a pardon or amnesty.
- To appoint the Commander-in-Chief of Defence Services
- Declare a state of emergency with the approval from the National Defence and Security Council
- Appoint and remove Cabinet ministers

== Election process ==
The president is not directly elected by Burmese voters; instead, they are indirectly elected by the Presidential Electoral College (သမ္မတရွေးချယ်တင်မြှောက်ရေးအဖွဲ့), an electoral body made of three separate committees. One committee is composed of MPs who represent the proportions of MPs elected from each Region or State; another is composed of MPs who represent the proportions of MPs elected from each township population; the third is of military-appointed MPs personally nominated by the Defence Services' commander-in-chief.

Each of the three committees nominates a presidential candidate. Afterward, all the Pyidaungsu Hluttaw MPs vote for one of three candidates—the candidate with the highest number of votes is elected president, while the other two are elected as vice-presidents. The president serves for a term of 5 years. Should a president resign for any reason or die in office, the Presidential Electoral College will meet and each of the three committees will nominate a candidate to finish out the prior President's term so that the terms of the legislature and presidency are synchronised. The candidate who receives the most votes from the nominees is elected.

This process is similar to the one prescribed by the 1947 Constitution, in which MPs from the Parliament's Chamber of Nationalities and Chamber of Deputies elected the president by secret ballot. The President was then responsible for appointing a prime minister (on the advice of the Chamber of Deputies), who was constitutionally recognised as the head of government and led the Cabinet.

== See also ==
- Myanmar
  - Politics of Myanmar
  - List of heads of state of Myanmar
    - List of Burmese monarchs
    - List of heads of state of Myanmar since 1948
  - List of colonial governors of Burma
  - Vice President of Myanmar
  - Prime Minister of Myanmar
    - List of heads of government of Myanmar since 1948
  - State Counsellor of Myanmar
- Lists of office-holders
