= Nyo Saw =

First Vice President of Myanmar since 2026

U Nyo Saw
- ညိုစော
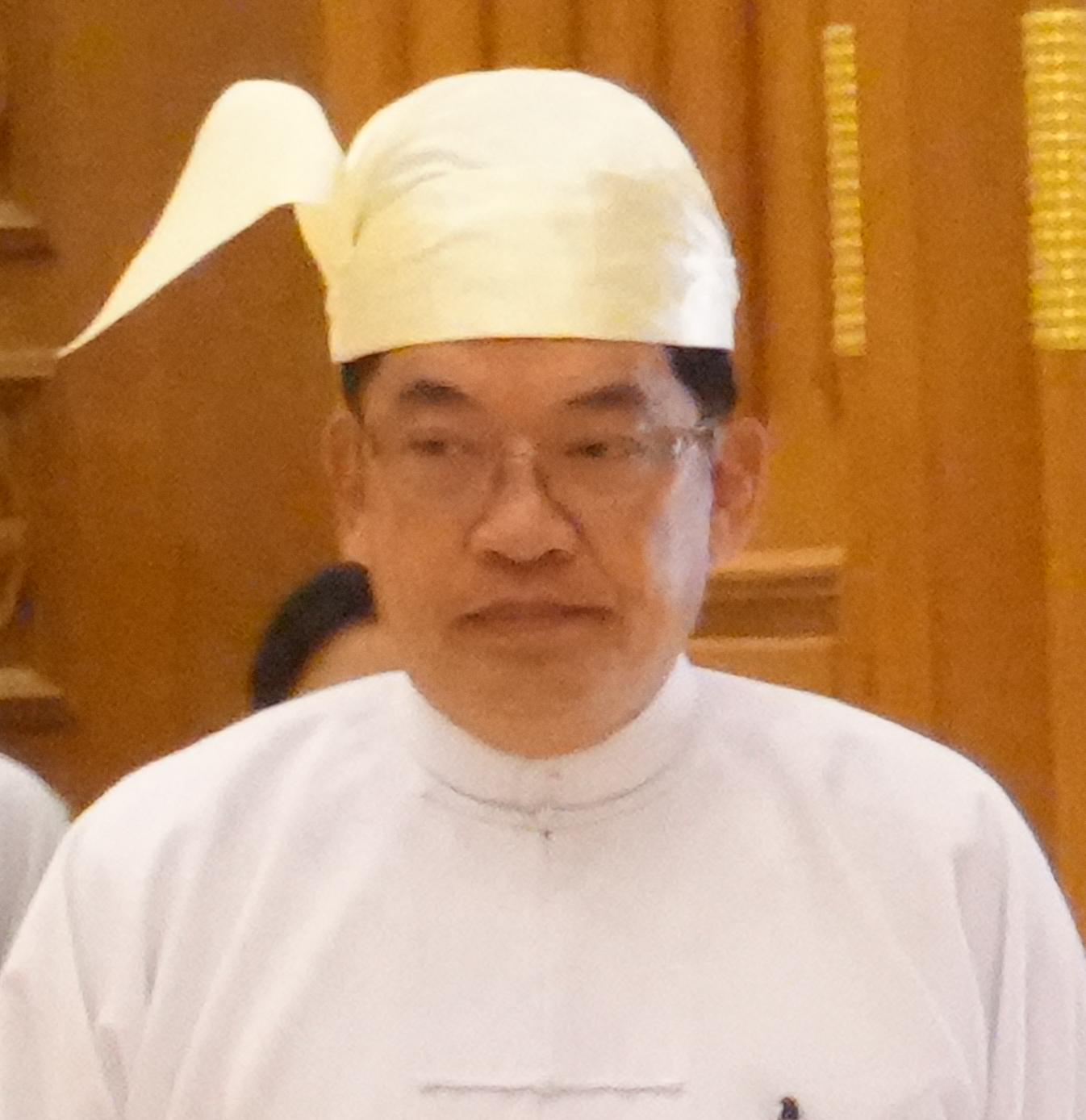
- Nyo Saw in 2026

4th First Vice President of Myanmar
- Incumbent
- Assumed office 10 April 2026 Serving with Nan Ni Ni Aye
- President: Min Aung Hlaing
- Preceded by: Myint Swe

13th Prime Minister of Myanmar
- In office 31 July 2025 – 10 April 2026
- President: Min Aung Hlaing (acting)
- Preceded by: Min Aung Hlaing
- Succeeded by: Office abolished

Member of the Pyithu Hluttaw for Cocokyun Township
- In office 16 March 2026 – 10 April 2026
- Preceded by: Thura Thet Swe
- Succeeded by: Vacant
Other positions held
Minister of National Planning and Economic Development
In office 31 July 2025 – 10 April 2026
Prime Minister	Himself
Deputy	Kyaw Htin
Preceded by	Kan Zaw
Succeeded by	Aung Kyaw Hu
Chairman of the Myanmar Economic Corporation
In office 2014 – 10 April 2026
Preceded by	Tin Aung Myint Oo
Member of the State Security and Peace Commission
In office 31 July 2025 – 10 April 2026
Member of the State Administration Council
In office 25 September 2023 – 31 July 2025
Preceded by	Soe Htut and Moe Myint Tun

Personal details
- Party: USDP
- Spouse: San San Aye
- Children: 3
- Education: Defence Services Academy

Military service
- Allegiance: Myanmar
- Branch/service: Tatmadaw; Myanmar Army
- Years of service: 1980–2020
- Rank: General

Nyo Saw (Burmese: ညိုစော), commonly known as U Nyo Saw, is a Burmese politician and former military officer who has served as the fourth first vice president of Myanmar since April 2026. A member of the Union Solidarity and Development Party (USDP), he previously served as the 13th Prime Minister and Minister of National Planning and Economic Development from 2025 to 2026, Chairman of the Myanmar Economic Corporation from 2014 to 2026, and was also a member of the State Administration Council (SAC) from 2021 to 2025 and then the State Security and Peace Commission (SSPC) from 2025 to 2026.

Born in an unknown location, Nyo Saw was educated in Defence Services Academy, where he graduated and entered service with a posting as a brigadier general staff officer under the Yangon Command where he held multiple senior roles. Nyo Saw was promoted to quartermaster general in 2014 and was also appointed Chairman of the Myanmar Economic Corporation (MEC) that year. He retained both those roles after retiring from the Myanmar Army in 2020. In 2023, Nyo Saw was appointed a member of the SAC, the then-ruling military junta of Myanmar.

In July 2025, the State Administration Council was abolished and was replaced by the State Security and Peace Commission, and as well as the state of emergency. The junta leader Min Aung Hlaing appointed Nyo Saw as Prime Minister, Minister of National Planning and Economic Development, and a member of the newly formed commission. His appointment came as the country was getting ready for general elections later in the year.

== Early life and education ==
Nyo Saw graduated from the 23rd intake of the Defence Services Academy.

== Career ==
Nyo Saw began his career as a grade one general staff officer at the Yangon command. He served as the commandant of the Defence Services Technological Academy and the Defence Services Academy, and also headed the country's central and southern commands.

Nyo Saw served as quartermaster general from 2014 to April 2020.

As of August 2022, he serves as the chairman of the Myanmar Economic Corporation. In July 2023, he was appointed as the advisor to the chairman of State Administration Council.

On 25 September 2023, he was appointed to the State Administration Council.

On 31 July 2025, a meeting of the National Defence and Security Council was convened. Following this, Acting President Senior General Min Aung Hlaing signed and issued an order announcing the formation of the new Union Government in which Nyo Saw was appointed as the Prime Minister. In addition to his role as Prime Minister, he also concurrently serves as the Union Minister of the Ministry of National Planning.

Nyo Saw ran and was elected as the Union Solidarity and Development Party candidate in the 2025–26 Myanmar general election for Pyithu Hluttaw in Cocokyun Township, Yangon Region, considered a sham process by independent observers.

== Personal life ==
Nyo Saw is married to San San Aye and have three children.

== Personal sanctions ==
On 11 December 2023, the European Council imposed personal restrictions on Nyo Saw due to his direct contribution to dismantling and undermining democracy and stability in Myanmar as a member of the State Administration Council, a body established by the junta to facilitate and legitimize their rule over Myanmar after the 2021 coup d'état.

Political offices
Preceded by Min Aung Hlaing	Prime Minister of Myanmar; 2025–2026	Office abolished
Preceded by Kan Zaw	Minister of National Planning and Economic Development; 2025–2026	Succeeded by Aung Kyaw Hu
Preceded by Myint Swe	First Vice President of Myanmar; 2026–present	Incumbent
