= Armed Forces Day (Myanmar) =

Public holiday in Myanmar (27 March)

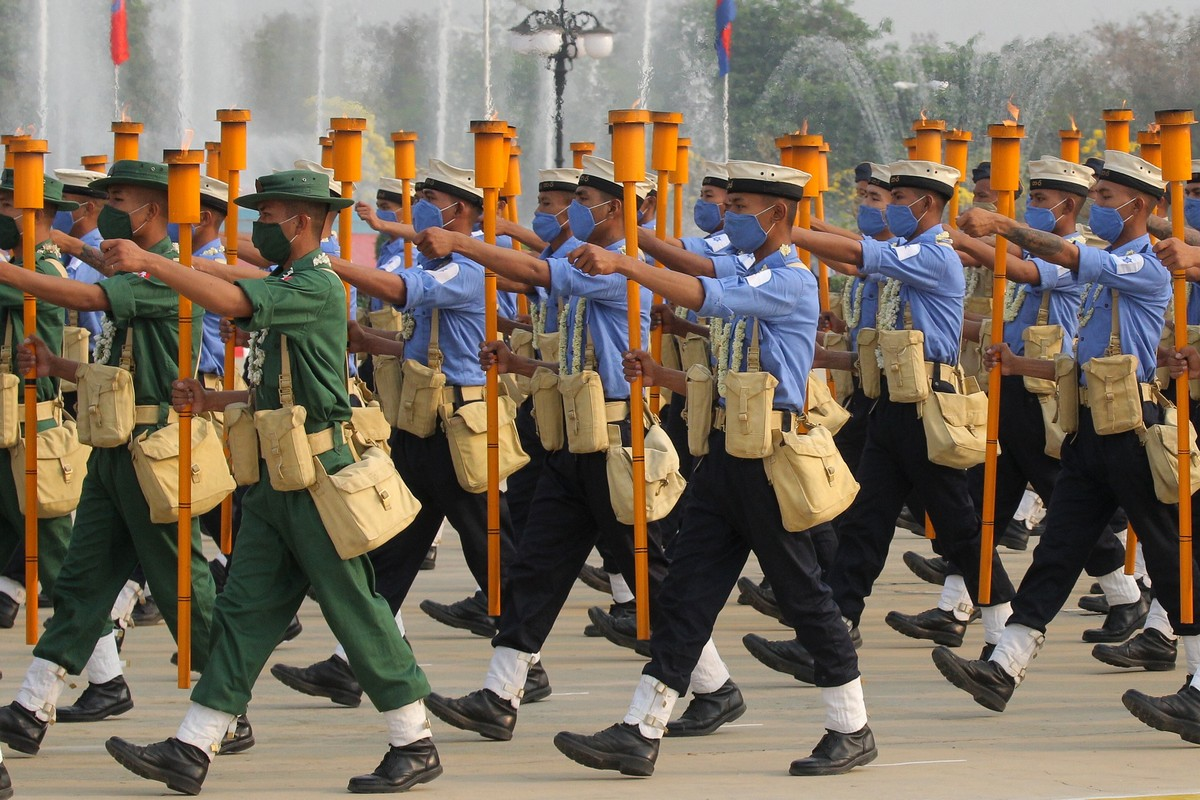
- Armed Forces Day parade in 2021
- Official name: တပ်မတော်နေ့
- Also called: တော်လှန်ရေးနေ့ Revolution Day
- Observed by: Myanmar
- Type: National
- Significance: Commemorates the start of the Burma National Army's resistance to Japanese occupation in 1945
- Celebrations: Military parades, fireworks
- Date: 27 March
- Frequency: Annual

Armed Forces Day (Burmese: တပ်မတော်နေ့), also known as Revolution Day (Burmese: တော်လှန်ရေးနေ့), is the professional holiday of the Tatmadaw (lit. 'Armed Forces'), celebrated annually on 27 March. It commemorates the start of Burmese Army's resistance to Japanese occupation in 1945. It was initially named as the Revolution Day and celebrated in each of the individual military units from 1946 to 1953, and the reenactment of the march of the revolutionary forces was started to be paraded in 1954. Since the evening of 27 March 1955, the Revolution Day has been renamed to the Defence Services Day or the Armed Forces Day. The holiday has been referred to as Anti-Fascist-Resistance Day by participants in the 2021 Myanmar protests.

== Holiday events ==
=== Military parade ===
The main event of the holiday is a military parade in central Naypyidaw, the capital, and formerly held in Yangon. The reviewing officer of the parade is the Commander-in-Chief of Defence Services, a billet of a general ranked officer usually holding Senior General (equivalent to Field Marshal) rank.

Parades in past years:

- 2013: Nobel Peace Prize laureate Aung San Suu Kyi, the former State Counsellor of Myanmar was notably among the attendees.
- 2019: Senior General Min Aung Hlaing was unable to attend the 74th Armed Forces Day event leaving his deputy, Vice-Senior General Soe Win, to represent him instead.
- 2020: The parade of 2020 commemorating the 75th anniversary of the defeat of Japanese forces was postponed due to the COVID-19 pandemic in Myanmar. The Myanmar military declared it would plan the diamond jubilee celebrations after the World Health Organization declares that the disease is under control. Among the expected attendees included National League for Democracy leader Tin Oo and former Prime Minister of Myanmar Than Shwe.
- 2021: The 76th Armed Forces Day parade was scaled back to follow health guidelines. Russian Deputy Defence Minister Alexander Fomin was one of the dignitaries in attendance.
- 2024: The 79th edition was the first ever night parade held in the holiday's history with a limited flypast due to the time of day it was held.

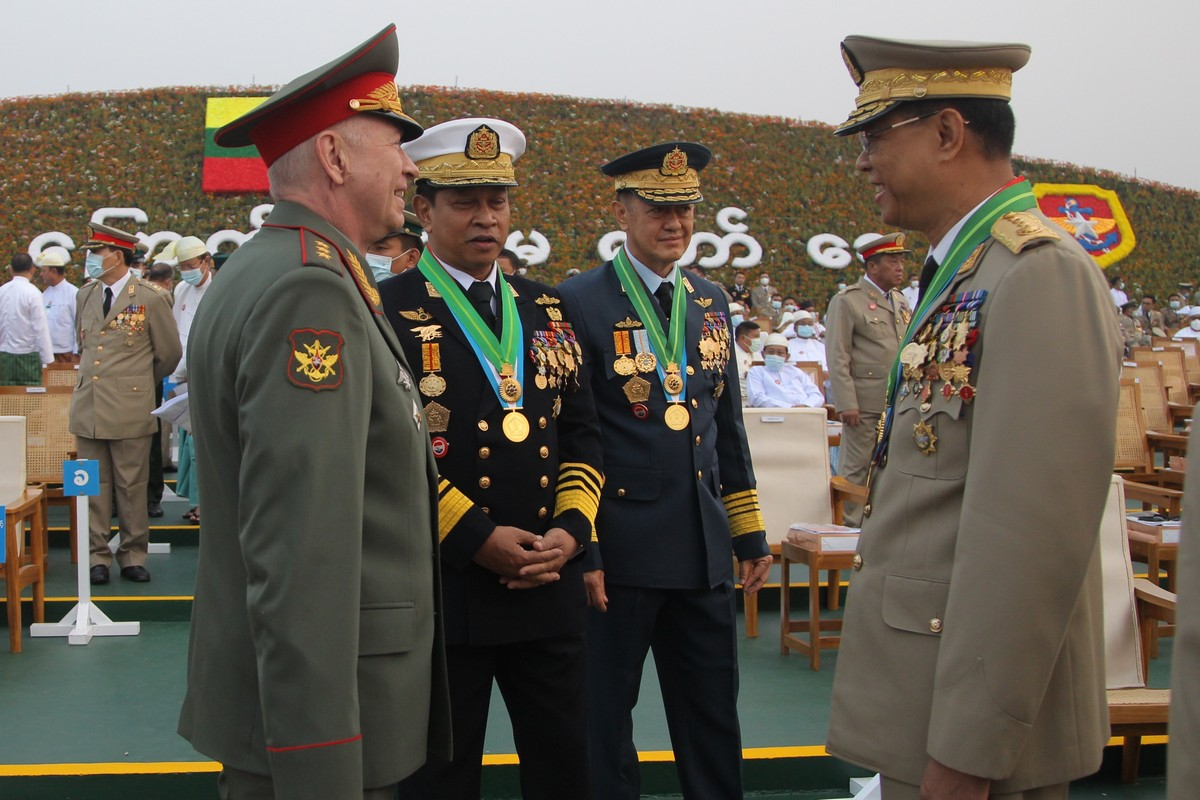
Parade in 2021

==== Expanded summary of the parade ====
After the national flag had been raised earlier in a prior ceremony, the formation of more than 18,000 personnel of the Tatmadaw all assembled in a nearby assembly ground, from not just units of the Naypyidaw Region but also from the rest of Myanmar, begin their sunrise or sunset march to the main parade ground at Shanzu in Naypyidaw where the main parade will be held.

While on the way residents of the capital, as well as visitors enjoying the holiday, watch as the ground and mobile columns make their way to the parade ground, as many bring leis of local flowers as a garland to be worn by those in the former. After an hour or two, all are assembled on the venue to await the arrival of the guests of the ceremony, led by the Parade Commander and his Second in Command, a billet of a Brigadier General or Major General for the former and colonel for the latter. Each of the contingents of the parade, formed on echelons of regiments at this point, are led by colour guard companies, the first of which carry the national flag and the official colour of the Tatmadaw. During this time the military bands which have been playing marches as accompaniment to the marching troops all take their places in the parade square, where veterans of the Tatmadaw from all conflicts past and present, members of Parliament, employees and staff of the armed forces headquarters and the Naypidaw Region, foreign defense attaches and members of the public are assembled.

Joining the massed bands is a pipe band and buglers from the Pipes and Drums of Tatmadaw General Headquarters, which positions itself near the bands.

At around 9 am, preceded by the President, Vice President, State Counselor, and the Prime Minister, the Commander in Chief Defense Services takes his place in the dais escorted by a ceremonial mounted cavalry unit of the Tatmadaw General Headquarters, and with the parade at attention it presents arms. The massed bands, led by the conductor of the Central Military Band of the Myanmar Armed Forces, plays General Salute, and once the music ends the parade slopes arms and orders arms, and the PC informs the guest of honor:

"Sir, the parade in honor of the establishment of the Armed Forces of the Union of Myanmar and the anniversary of beginning of armed resistance against the Empire of Japan for the liberation of Myanmar during the Second World War has now been formed up and ready for your inspection, sir."

The PC and the parade guest of honor ride an inspection vehicle as the massed bands play a quick march as the ground and mobile columns are inspected. The formations all stand at attention at this point as a 21-gun salute is fired.

Following this the main parade begins as following the return of the parade reviewing officer, he turns about to face the national flag pole on the parade ground as the parade presents arms and the massed bands play the National Anthem Kaba Ma Kyei. While the anthem is performed, the military guests in the audience render the regulation hand salute. Following the playing of the anthem, after the parade is commanded at stand at ease, the Commander-in-Chief Defense Services makes his keynote address on the holiday to the nation and the men and women of the Forces. Following the address, the PC orders the parade to attention and after the parade slopes arms, he reports on the readiness of the parade to march past the dais and off the parade ground to the parade's chief guest.

As the PC and the second in command move to the first parade echelon, the bands start playing after the order has been given to commence march by the first parade battalion and the parade marches off, each battalion saluting to the dignitaries with swords and eyes right.

=== Other events ===
An evening dinner is among the other events that are held on 27 March.

=== Gallery ===
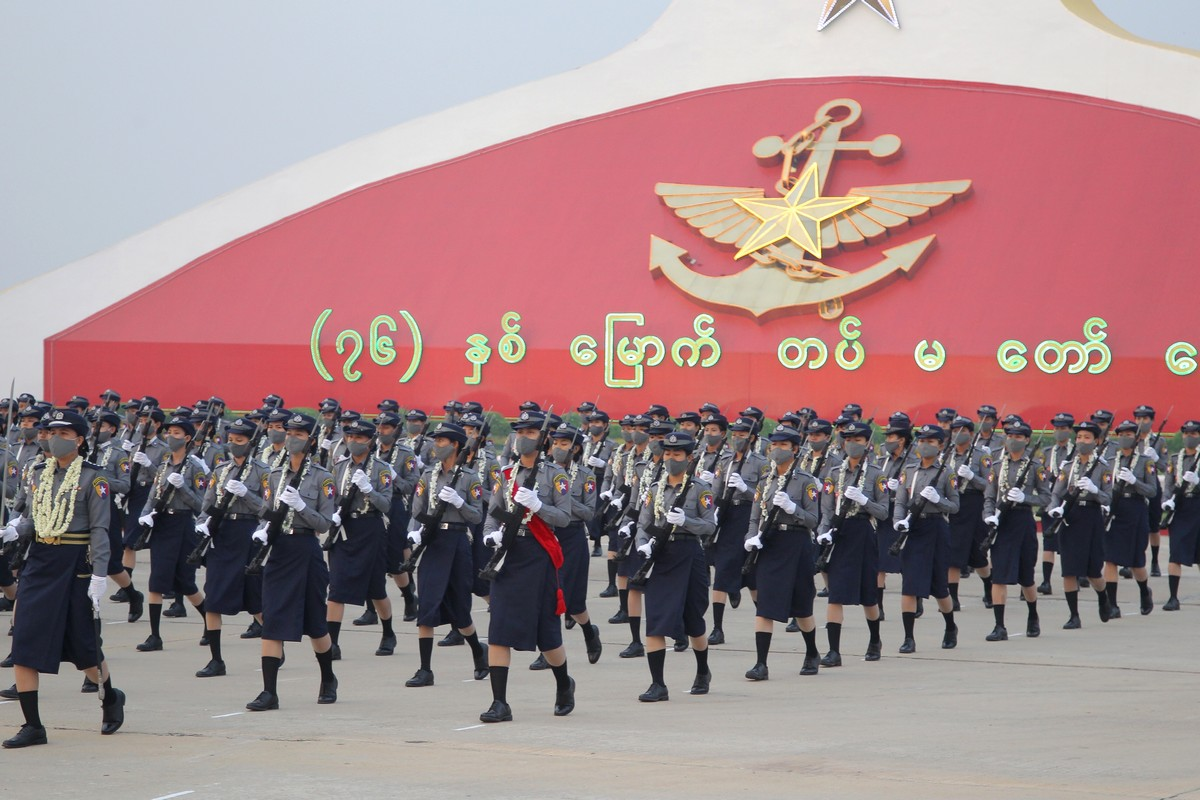
Female personnel

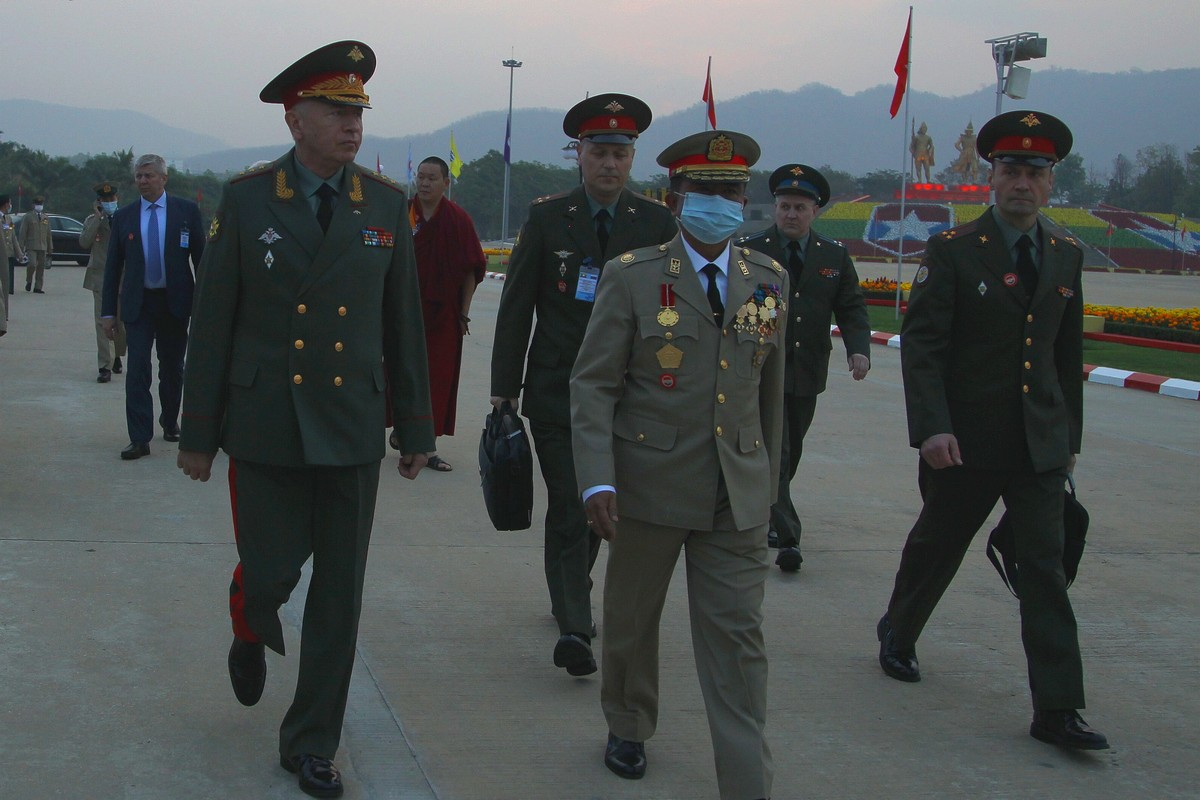
Alexander Fomin at the parade.

== 2021 incidents on Armed Forces Day ==
On 27 March 2021, during the 76th annual Armed Forces Day, at least 107 were reported to have been killed, with news outlet Myanmar Now reporting 114 deaths, the highest death toll of any individual day since the Myanmar protests began after the coup d'état on 1 February, staged by Senior General Min Aung Hlaing, the commander-in-chief of the Armed Forces.

Earlier that day, the Myanmar military launched airstrikes on a village controlled by ethnic army the Karen National Union, which had earlier taken over an army post near the Myanmar–Thailand border, killing ten people including a lieutenant colonel. General Yawd Serk of the Restoration Council of Shan State/Shan State Army-South stated during an interview "The Myanmar Armed Forces Day isn't an armed forces day, it's more like the day they killed people", and "If they continue to shoot at protesters and bully the people, I think all the ethnic groups would not just stand by and do nothing."

The European Union delegation to Myanmar has stated "This 76th Myanmar armed forces day will stay engraved as a day of terror and dishonour", with U.S. Ambassador Thomas Vajda saying "security forces are murdering unarmed civilians" and calling for "an immediate end to the violence and the restoration of the democratically elected government".

== See also ==
- Independence Day (Myanmar)
- Martyrs' Day (Myanmar)
