= 7th Sense Creation =

Burmese filmmaking company

- Native name: သတ္တမမြောက်အာရုံ
- Industry: Entertainment
- Founded: 3 April 2017; 8 years ago in Myanmar
- Founders: Khin Thiri Thet Mon; San Ko Ko Tint San; Wai Min Aung; Naing Phyo Kyaw
- Headquarters: Myanmar
- Website: 7th Sense Creation on Facebook

7th Sense Creation (Burmese: သတ္တမမြောက်အာရုံ) is a major film production and media company in Myanmar. 7th Sense was cofounded by Khin Thiri Thet Mon, the daughter of Myanmar's commander-in-chief Min Aung Hlaing, San Ko Ko Tint San, the son of former sports minister Tint Hsan, Wai Min Aung, and Naing Phyo Kyaw in 2017. The company was registered with Myanmar's Directorate of Investment and Company Administration on 3 April 2017. Between 2017 and 2019, it produced eight motion picture films, including Mone Swel, a blockbuster that won a Myanmar Academy Award. The company has courted scrutiny for its ability to outspend rivals on production budgets and actor salaries.

In July 2019, 7th Sense signed exclusive contracts with five Burmese actors, including Nay Toe and Wutt Hmone Shwe Yi, who are two of Myanmar's biggest movie stars. The American Embassy, Yangon came under media scrutiny in December 2020, for collaborating with 7th Sense Creation as its media partner for a music festival, because Khin Thiri Thet Mon's father Min Aung Hlaing, is technically subject to US economic sanctions.

In the aftermath of the 2021 Myanmar coup d'état, 7th Sense has been the target of a domestic boycott called the "Stop Buying Junta Business", a boycott of military-linked goods and services due to its ties to the Burmese military.

On 10 March 2021, the U.S. government sanctioned 7th Sense Creation and five other companies owned by Khin Thiri Thet Mon and her brother Aung Pyae Sone for having directly benefitted from their father's position and malign influence.

In March 2023, a proxy of 7th Sense Creation, SM Winner Entertainment, was listed on Myanmar's corporate registry.
