= People's Party (Myanmar) =

People's Party ပြည်သူ့ပါတီ
- Abbreviation: PP
- Chairperson: Ko Ko Gyi
- Founders: Ko Ko Gyi, Ye Naing Aung, Moe Thway, Thet Swe Win
- Founded: 19 December 2017 (8 years, 291 days)
- Registered: 47
- Ideology: Centrism; Federalism; Reconciliation
- Colours: Yellow
- Amyotha Hluttaw: 5 / 224

The People's Party (Burmese: ပြည်သူ့ပါတီ) is a political party in Myanmar, founded by peace and democracy activist Ko Ko Gyi. It cooperates with the military backed government of Myanmar.

== Founding and registration ==
The People's Party formed around Ko Ko Gyi after the National League for Democracy, the leading pro-democracy party in Myanmar, refused to nominate him for the 2015 Myanmar general election, which was won by the NLD. Ko Ko Gyi, who was a leading activist during the 8888 Uprising, established the party under the name of Four Eights Party, as a direct reference to the 8888 uprising and 88 Generation Students Group. The name drew criticism from other participants of the democracy movement in Myanmar. The registration of the party was rejected in December of 2017 by the Union Election Commission on grounds of the controversial name.

Early leading members of the party like Thet Swe Win and Moe Thway left the party over disagreements between them and the Ko Ko Gyi regarding the Rohingya genocide. Win and Thway felt that the party leadership was not supportive of the rights of the Rohingya and didn't support those who criticized the military and government over its actions against the Rohingya.

The party changed its name to Four Eights People’s Party afterwards, trying to register the party in June of 2018. The reference to the 8888 Uprising and Movement still drew over 200 complaints. The Union Election Commission warned the party, that it couldn't be registered under the planned name. In July 2018, the third plenary meeting of the party decided to change the name to People's party. The Party was registered under its new name on August 23, 2018.

== 2020 election ==
The People's Party ran 151 candidates in the 2020 Myanmar general election. Party chairman Ko Ko Gyi claimed interference by the Union Electoral Commission in the campaign, especially censorship of political messages by the party on state media broadcasts. The party failed to win any seats.

== Cooperation with the military regime ==
After the 2021 Myanmar coup d'état the People's Party joined discussions with the junta appointed Union Electoral Commission, which lead to the resignation of seven members of its executive committee, including the general secretary of the party, Ye Naing Aung.

The party re-registered with the election commission following the new law on political parties on December 29, 2023. The party pledged to cooperate with the military junta, supporting peace talks with the ethnic armed organisations that fight the military.

The People's Party participated in the 2025–26 Myanmar general election, which was boycotted by most opposition parties. It received the third highest votes total of the participating parties, winning five proportionally elected seats in the Amyotha Hluttaw, although it failed to win any of the constituency seats, leaving it without representation in the Pyithu Hluttaw.

== Ideology and Program ==
The party doesn't claim adherence to a specific ideology. At its foundation, it was generally critical of the government for slow progress regarding human rights, economic development. Party chairman Ko Ko Gyi supported negotiations with the military leaders to change the 2008 Constitution of Myanmar towards the aim of forming a more democratic and federal system, without antagonising them. After the military coup, the party largely adapted to the military regime, cooperating with the authorities of the regime and supporting the Myanmar peace process. In 2025, party chairman Ko Ko Gyi declared, that the party would prioritise peace as its primary goal. During the 2025 election campaign, it declared itself as a centrist party, supporting federalism, democracy and peace.

== Party symbols ==
The emblem of the party features a red torch on a yellow background. The party color is yellow.

== Election results ==
=== House of Nationalities (Amyotha Hluttaw) ===
Election	Leader	Total seats won	Total votes	Share of votes	+/-	Status
2020	Ko Ko Gyi	0 / 224	15,325	0.06%	New	Not recognised
2025–26	Ko Ko Gyi	5 / 224	1,096,822	8.67%	▲5	TBD

=== House of Representatives (Pyithu Hluttaw) ===
Election	Leader	Total seats won	Total votes	Share of votes	+/-	Status
2020	Ko Ko Gyi	0 / 440	34,060	0.13%	New	Not recognised
2025–26	Ko Ko Gyi	0 / 440	1,149,720	8.83%	0	extra-parliamentary
