= Khin Thiri Thet Mon =

Burmese businesswoman

- ခင်သီရိသက်မွန်
- Born: 5 December 1981 (age 44); Yangon, Myanmar
- Education: Basic Education High School No. 2 Sanchaung; University of Computer Studies, Yangon
- Occupation: Businesswoman
- Known for: Co-founder of 7th Sense Creation
- Spouse: Lin Myint Phwel (m. 2010; div. 2019)
- Children: Akari Thet Mon Hlaing (12 August 2012); May Barani Thet Mon Hlaing (9 June 2016)
- Parent(s): Min Aung Hlaing; Kyu Kyu Hla
- Relatives: Aung Pyae Sone

Khin Thiri Thet Mon (Burmese: ခင်သီရိသက်မွန်; born 5 December 1981), also known as Ma Thiri (Burmese: မသီရိ), is a Burmese businesswoman and daughter of the former Commander-in-Chief of Defence Services Senior General Min Aung Hlaing, the former Prime Minister of Myanmar, the former Chairman of the State Administration Council which ruled Myanmar after the 2021 Myanmar coup d'état until 2025, and the current President of Myanmar.

== Business interests ==
She entered the entertainment industry with ventures in 2017. She is a co-founder of a major film production company, 7th Sense Creation. According to another co-founder, besides being involved in financing, her interests include costume design and identifying novels that might be adapted into films.

As of 2019, she is banned from entry to the United States.

The U.S. Department of the Treasury has imposed sanctions on her and her brother Aung Pyae Sone since 10 March 2021, pursuant to Executive Order 14014, in response to the Burmese military's coup against the democratically elected civilian government of Myanmar. The sanctions include freezing of assets under the US and a ban on transactions with US persons. She became a major target of a domestic boycott and social punishment by people who oppose the military regime.

She is also a founder of Everfit, a chain of luxury gyms. She also part-owned Pinnacle Asia, a company that secured a deal to supply mobile towers to Mytel, a military-controlled telecoms firm. A week after the US imposed sanctions on her, she was removed from company registration as a director. Khin Thiri Thet Mon has acquired a stake in Investcom PTE Ltd, which has bought Norwegian telecoms firm Telenor's operation in Myanmar. She has also invested in SBP which will eventually control 80 percent of Telenor Myanmar. She is a director of Star Sapphire, an arms broker for the Burmese military.

In September 2022, Thai authorities arrested Burmese tycoon Tun Min Latt who is closely associated with Min Aung Hlaing and his family, on money laundering and drug trafficking charges, following a raid. The September 2022 raid found assets of her bank records and her brother Aung Pyae Sone's property title to a four-bedroom luxury condominium worth nearly US$1 million in Bangkok's Belle Rama 9 complex.

She reportedly co-owned Honey Nest, a large bar in Yangon, and chose to sell the business in November 2023 following multiple bombing explosions. In December 2023, she, along with Naing Phyo Kyaw and Wai Min Maung, established NPK Motor Company and secured the rights to import electric cars and MG cars in Myanmar.

== Personal life ==
In 2010, she married Lin Myint Phwel, a former DJ and producer who was the leader of the DJ Xoon Mite group. He is reportedly on the board of directors of Seventh Sense, a major film production and media company. He was also the director and shareholder of Minn Pyae Tagon Industrial Co. Ltd., both subsidiaries of the Aung Myin Thu Group. He has been removed from the board of Aung Myin Thu companies since the publication of the United Nations fact-finding mission report on the Myanmar military's business networks. After having two daughters, they divorced on 30 May 2019.
