= Alexander Fomin =

Russian military and politician

Colonel General Alexander Fomin
- Александр Фомин
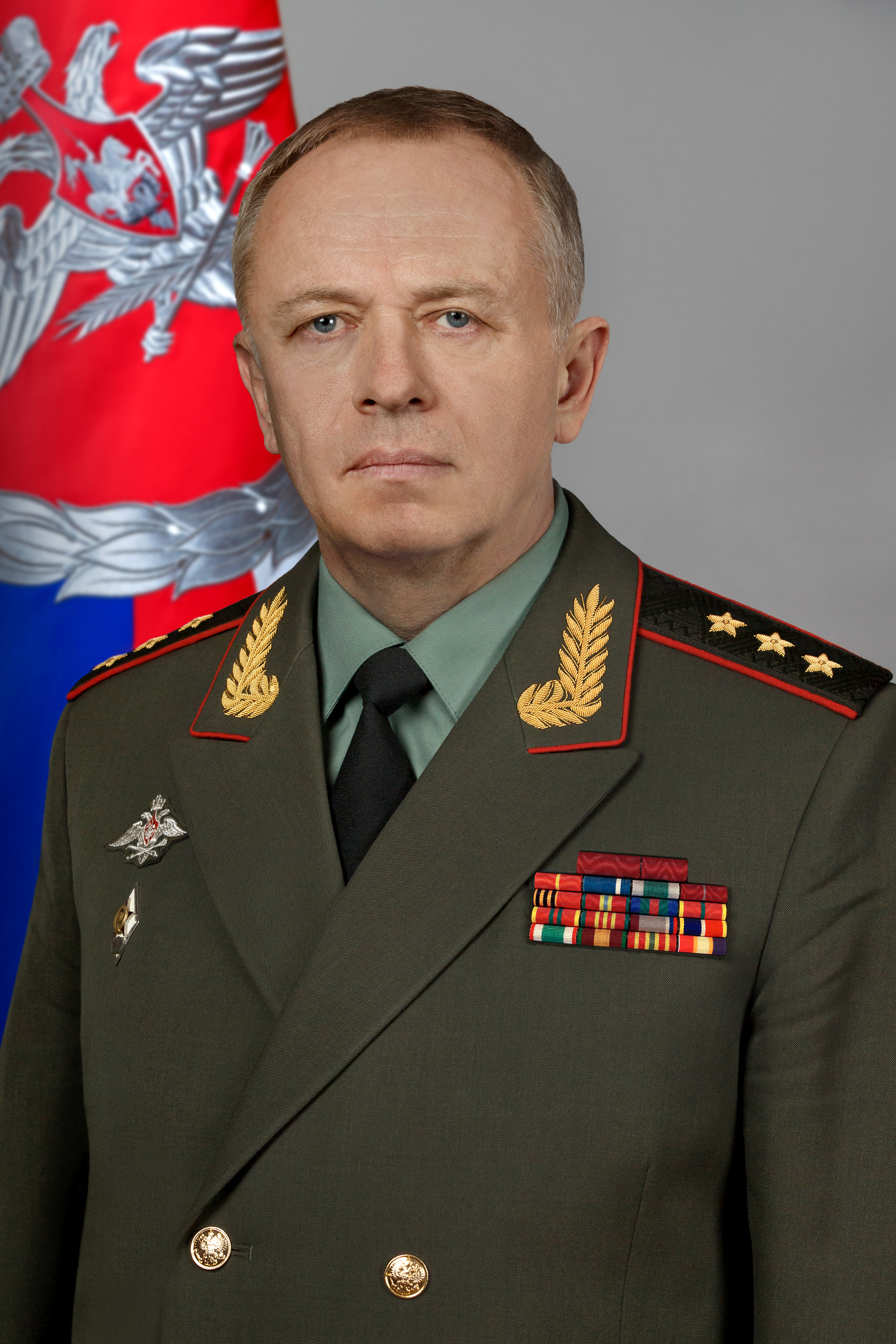
- Official portrait, 2017

Deputy Minister of Defence
- Incumbent
- Assumed office 31 January 2017
- President: Vladimir Putin
- Minister: Sergei Shoigu; Andrey Belousov
- Preceded by: Anatoly Antonov

Personal details
- Born: May 25, 1959 (age 67) Leninogorsk, East Kazakhstan Region, Kazakh SSR, USSR (now Ridder, Kazakhstan)
- Education: Military University of the Ministry of Defense of the Russian Federation

Military service
- Allegiance: Soviet Union (1977–1991); Russia (1991–present)
- Branch/service: Armed Forces of the Russian Federation
- Years of service: 1977 — 1993
- Rank: Colonel General

Alexander Vasilyevich Fomin (Russian: Александр Васильевич Фомин, born May 25, 1959) is a Russian Deputy Minister of Defence.

== Biography ==
Alexander Fomin was born on May 25, 1959, in Leninogorsk. He attended the Military Institute of the Red Banner of the Ministry of Defence (now the Military University of the Russian Defence Ministry) in Moscow, graduating in 1984.

Fomin was promoted to Deputy Minister of Defence of the Russian Federation in 2017.

In February 2018, Fomin was promoted to the rank of Colonel General.

In March 2021, he visited Myanmar in his capacity as a military attaché and expressed Russia's commitment to maintaining friendly relations with the country.

In 2022, Fomin was appointed as the representative of the Russian Ministry of Defense at the negotiations between Russia and Ukraine with the purpose of resolving the war between the two countries.

== Sanctions ==
As a result of his support for Russian aggression and violation of Ukraine's territorial integrity during the Russo-Ukrainian war, Fomin is subject to personal international sanctions from several countries. Australia imposed sanctions on him in February 2022, while the United Kingdom and New Zealand followed suit in March. In October 2022, Ukrainian President Volodymyr Zelenskyy issued a decree imposing sanctions on Fomin.

== Awards and decorations ==
- Order "For Merit to the Fatherland", 2nd class
- Order "For Merit to the Fatherland", 3rd class
- Order "For Merit to the Fatherland", 4th class
- Order of Honour
