= Triangle Regional Military Command =

Military unit in Myanmar

- တြိဂံဒေသတိုင်းစစ်ဌာနချုပ်
- Triangle Regional Military Command Seal
- Active: 1996–present
- Country: Myanmar
- Allegiance: Tatmadaw
- Branch: Myanmar Army
- Type: Regional Military Command
- Role: Management and oversight of territorial defense, security, military operations, and all command/operational/logistical matters of the forces within the region.
- Garrison/HQ: Kengtung, Shan State
- Nickname(s): Triangle

Commanders
- Regional commander: Brigadier General/Major General Soe Hlaing
- Deputy regional commander: Colonel Kyaw Naing Soe

Insignia
- Flag

The Triangle Regional Military Command (Burmese: တြိဂံဒေသတိုင်းစစ်ဌာနချုပ်), also abbreviated as Tha Ta Kha (Burmese: တသခ) is a regional military command of the Myanmar Army. It is headquartered in Kengtung, Shan State.

== Role ==
The command is responsible for the defense, security, and military operations of eastern Shan State and surrounding areas. It also oversees administration, logistics, and coordination of subordinate military units under its jurisdiction. It implements directives from higher military authorities and maintains command structure integrity across its region.

== History ==
The Eastern Regional Military Command was first established in Taunggyi in 1961. In 1972, the Northeastern Command was created by splitting from the Northern Command under the Ministry of Defense. In 1996, the Triangle Regional Military Command was formally formed to oversee eastern Shan State, with headquarters in Kengtung.

Several senior military leaders have served as commanders of this command, including State Peace and Development Council (SPDC) member and President Thein Sein and future Commander-in-Chief Min Aung Hlaing.

== Organization ==
The Triangle Command oversees multiple operational commands in eastern Shan State and plays a strategic role in Myanmar's border security and ethnic conflict zones.

=== Operational Commands ===
- No. 14 Military Operations Command
- No. 18 Military Operations Command

== Former commanders ==
- Lieutenant General Thein Sein (ID: 11252)
- Lieutenant General Chit Than (15th intake)
- Lieutenant General Min Aung Hlaing (ID: 14232)
- Lieutenant General Kyaw Phyo (ID: 16521)
- Lieutenant General Than Htun Oo (ID: 17432)
- Lieutenant General Aung Zaw Aye (ID: 20175)
- Lieutenant General Khin Hlaing (ID: 22383)
- Lieutenant General Myo Min Tun (ID: 27984)
- Lieutenant General Ni Lin Aung (ID: 27160)
- Lieutenant General Aung Kyine Win (ID: 25957)
- Major General/ Lieutenant General Soe Hlaing (ID: 29208)

== See also ==
- Tatmadaw
- Myanmar Army
- Military Operations Command (Myanmar)
