= International Criminal Court investigation in Bangladesh/Myanmar =

Situation in the People’s Republic of Bangladesh/Republic of the Union of Myanmar
- The seal of the International Criminal Court
- File no.: ICC-01/19
- Date opened: November 14, 2019
- Incident(s): Deportation of Rohingya from Myanmar to Bangladesh
- Crimes: Crimes against humanity: · Deportation · Persecution

Status of suspect
- Min Aung Hlaing: Arrest warrant application pending in Pre-Trial Chamber I

The International Criminal Court Investigation in Bangladesh/Myanmar is an investigation by the International Criminal Court for crimes related to the deportation of Rohingya from Myanmar to Bangladesh that occurred since 1 June 2010 partly in Bangladesh and partly in Myanmar. The full investigation started on 14 November 2019. An arrest warrant for Min Aung Hlaing, then the commander-in-chief of Defence Services, for crimes against humanity was requested on 27 November 2024, and the application is being reviewed by Pre-Trial Chamber I.

== Jurisdiction and preliminary examination ==
On 9 April 2018, ICC Prosecutor Fatou Bensouda requested that the court decide on its jurisdiction over the situation of the deportation of Rohingya from Myanmar to Bangladesh, given that Bangladesh was a state party to the Rome Statute but Myanmar was not. The court stated that it had jurisdiction under Article 12(2)(a) of the Rome Statute.

Bensouda started a preliminary examination of the case in September 2018. She found "a reasonable basis to believe that at least 700,000 Rohingya" had been coercively deported, with the commission of crimes under Articles 7(1)(d), 7(1)(k) and 7(1)(h) of the Rome Statute, partly in Myanmar and partly in Bangladesh. On 4 July 2019 she requested permission to start a full investigation for events of the deportation starting since 9 October 2016.

== Investigation ==
On 14 November 2019, Pre-Trial Chamber III of the ICC authorised the investigation to commence, with scope covering crimes linked to the request that partly occurred in Bangladesh on or after 1 June 2010. The Chamber justified the 2010 start date based on the information it had received about crimes apparently committed earlier than 2016, and 1 June 2010 based on the date of Bangladesh becoming a party to the Rome Statute. No end date was set for the scope, on the condition that other crimes are "sufficiently linked" to the request for opening the investigation.

The initial investigations focused on violence against the Rohingya in Rakhine State in 2016 and 2017 and the movements of Rohingya from Myanmar to Bangladesh that followed the violence. Evidence considered in the investigation included witness reports, "documentary evidence and authenticated scientific, photographic and video materials".

== Cases ==
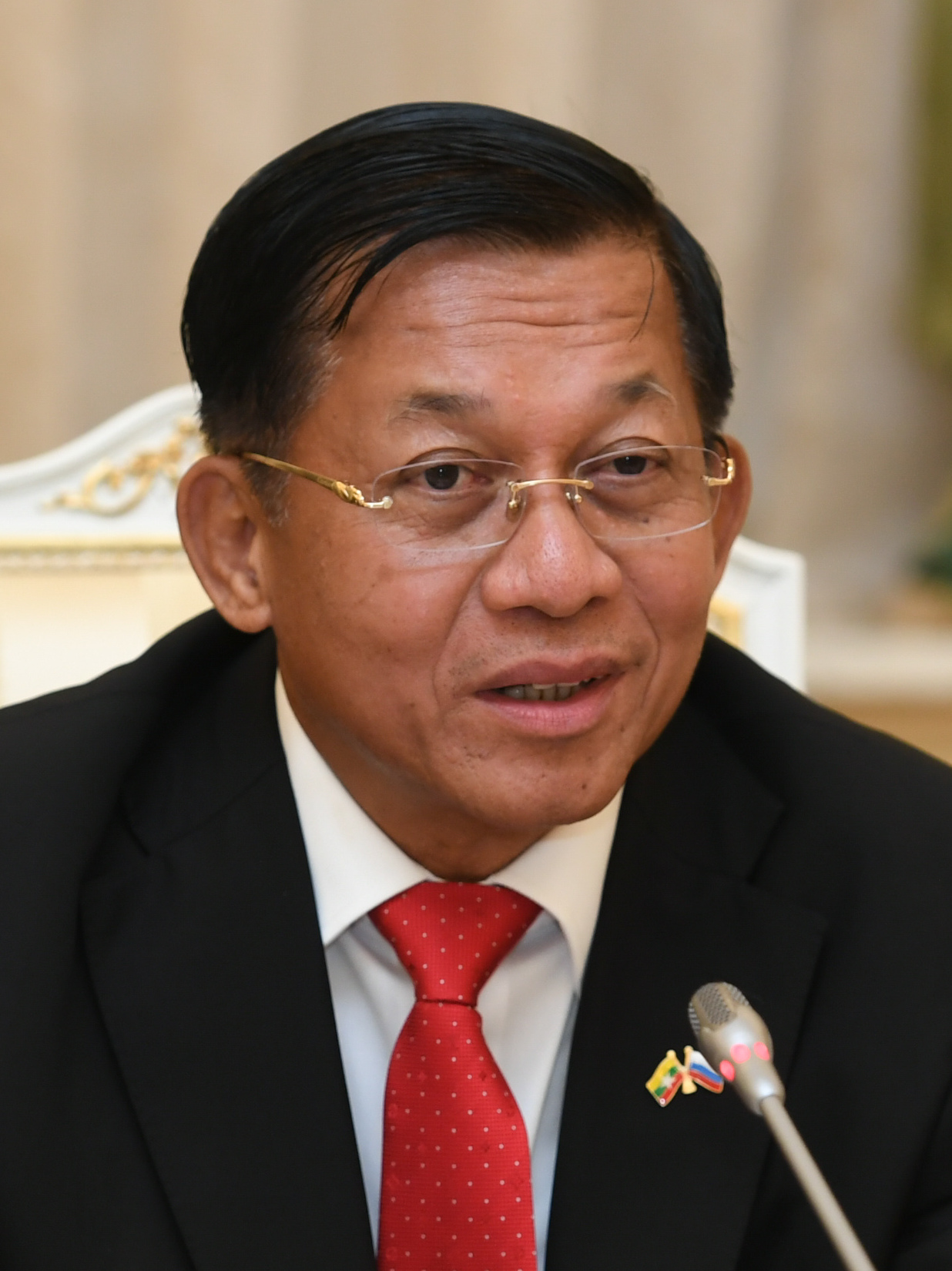
An arrest warrant for crimes against humanity was requested on 27 November 2024 against Min Aung Hlaing.

On 27 November 2024, ICC Prosecutor Karim Ahmad Khan requested an arrest warrant against Min Aung Hlaing from Pre-Trial Chamber I, stating that there were reasonable grounds to believe that Hlaing held "criminal responsibility for the crimes against humanity of deportation and persecution of the Rohingya, committed in Myanmar, and in part in Bangladesh" between 25 August 2017 and 31 December 2017 by Tatmadaw, including Border Guard Forces, and by the Myanmar Police Force and non-Rohingya civilians.

== Reactions ==
A Human Rights Watch legal advisor described the 27 November 2024 arrest warrant request against Hlaing as "com[ing] amid renewed atrocities against Rohingya civilians that echo those suffered seven years ago" and stated that "the ICC's action is an important step toward breaking the cycle of abuses and impunity that has long been a key factor in fueling the military's mass violations." Tun Khin of the Burmese Rohingya Organisation described the request as "another step towards justice and accountability."

== See also ==
- Myanmar civil war (2021–present)
