= Min Aung Hlaing =

Leader of Myanmar since 2021

His Excellency Agga Maha Thray Sithu Agga Maha Thiri Thudhamma Min Aung Hlaing
- မင်းအောင်လှိုင်
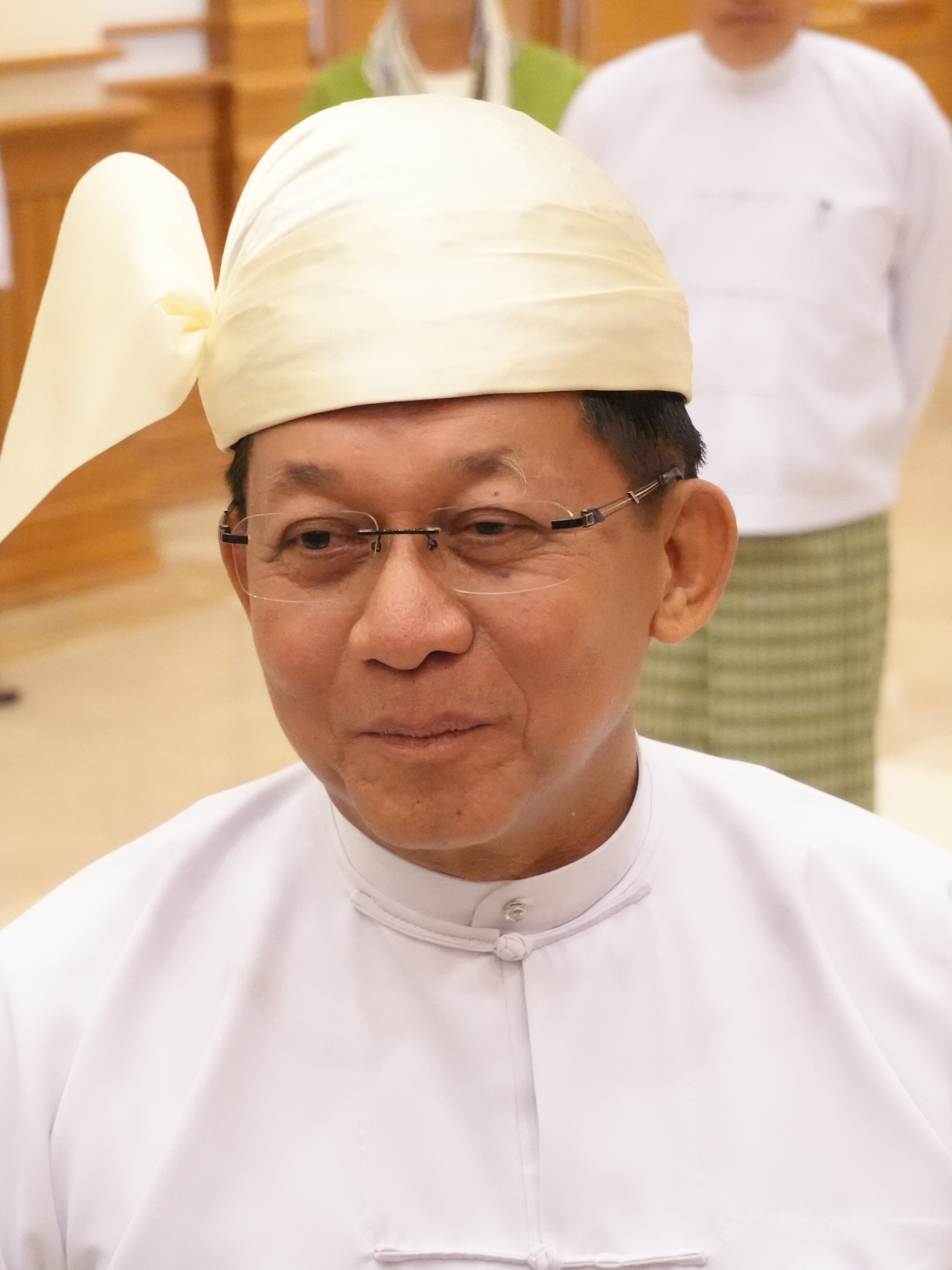
- Min Aung Hlaing in 2026

11th President of Myanmar
- Incumbent
- Assumed office 10 April 2026; Acting: 7 August 2025 – 10 April 2026 (Note: Although Min Aung Hlaing exercised limited presidential duties on Myint Swe's behalf from 22 July 2024, Myint Swe remained in office and died on 7 August 2025 as Acting President, as stated by state media and independently verified by outlets including The New York Times. Up to that point, Min Aung Hlaing was using the title Pro Tem President (On Duty) when signing legislation by the National Defence and Security Council (NDSC), based on Myint Swe's delegation of authority starting with his medical leave on 22 July 2024. When the NDSC met for the first time after Myint Swe's death, in February 2026, Min Aung Hlaing signed NDSC legislation as Acting President.)
- Prime Minister: Himself; Nyo Saw (Note: Position abolished 10 April 2026.)
- Vice President: First Vice President; Nyo Saw; Second Vice President; Nan Ni Ni Aye
- Preceded by: Win Myint (Note: Although Min Aung Hlaing leads the government as the president and Win Myint was the previous president, Win Myint's presidency was largely ceremonial and Min Aung Hlaing immediately succeeded Myanmar's de facto leader Aung San Suu Kyi, the state counsellor, after the 2021 coup, when he appointed himself the chairman of the State Administration Council. Myint Swe was installed as the acting president on the day of the coup and remained in office until Min Aung Hlaing succeeded him in 2025, but he played no independent role in the government, in practice being completely subordinate to Min Aung Hlaing and taking no actions other than chairing the NDSC in order to renew Min Aung Hlaing's emergency powers.)

Chairman of the State Administration Council
- In office 2 February 2021 – 31 July 2025
- Deputy: Soe Win
- Preceded by: Aung San Suu Kyi (as State Counsellor)
- Succeeded by: Office abolished (Note: All government functions were transferred back to the NDSC, chaired by Min Aung Hlaing as the acting president, for the transitional period that followed the end of the state of emergency on 31 July 2025.)
Other transitional positions
12th Prime Minister of Myanmar (Note: The post of Prime Minister was created by and subordinate to the State Administration Council (SAC), which was chaired by Min Aung Hlaing. Min Aung Hlaing ran the emergency military government primarily through the SAC from 2021 to 2025.)
In office 1 August 2021 – 31 July 2025
President	Myint Swe (acting)
Preceded by	Office re-established; Thein Sein (2011)
Succeeded by	Nyo Saw
Chairman of the State Security and Peace Commission (Note: The State Security and Peace Commission was an advisory body formed by the NDSC to help coordinate the 2025–26 Myanmar general election. All legislative, executive, and judicial power was retained by the NDSC and directly exercised by it.)
In office 31 July 2025 – 10 April 2026
Deputy	Soe Win
Preceded by	Office established
Succeeded by	Office abolished

Commander-in-Chief of Defence Services
- In office 30 March 2011 – 30 March 2026
- President: See list: Thein Sein Htin Kyaw Myint Swe (acting) Win Myint Himself (acting)
- Deputy: Soe Win
- Preceded by: Than Shwe
- Succeeded by: Ye Win Oo

Chief of the General Staff (Army, Navy and Air)
- In office June 2010 – 30 March 2011
- Commander-in-Chief: Than Shwe
- Preceded by: Shwe Mann
- Succeeded by: Hla Htay Win

Personal details
- Born: 3 July 1956 (age 70) Minbu, Burma
- Party: BSPP (until 1988); USDP (2026–present) (Note: Declared by the 2026 USDP National Conference that Min Aung Hlaing is a party member. It is speculated that he registered during the period between his military retirement and taking office as President.)
- Spouse: Kyu Kyu Hla (m. 1980)
- Children: Aung Pyae Sone; Khin Thiri Thet Mon
- Education: Yangon University (LLB); Defence Services Academy
- Occupation: Politician; military officer
- Website: www.seniorgeneralminaunghlaing.com.mm

Military service
- Allegiance: Myanmar
- Branch/service: Myanmar Army
- Years of service: 1974–2026
- Rank: Senior general
- Battles/wars: Internal conflict in Myanmar: Myanmar civil war (2021–present)

Min Aung Hlaing (Note: Burmese: မင်းအောင်လှိုင်, pronounced [mɪ́ɰ̃ àʊɰ̃ l̥àɪɰ̃]) (born 3 July 1956) is a politician and retired military officer from Myanmar who has been the 11th president of Myanmar since April 2026, having ruled the country continuously since seizing power in February 2021 through a military coup d'état against the elected government. Prior to the start of his nominally civilian presidency, he was a military dictator under various titles. (Note: As part of his military rule, Min Aung Hlaing exercised the duties of the presidency from 2024—becoming the acting president in 2025—but his governance also involved several temporary military leadership structures. He primarily exercised power as the chairman of the State Administration Council from the coup in February 2021 until 2025, and also held the temporary post of Prime Minister from August 2021 until 2025. From 2025 to 2026, his emergency powers as the leader of the military were no longer in effect and he governed as the acting president, though in coordination with the National Defence and Security Council, and was the Chairman of the advisory State Security and Peace Commission.) He was appointed the Commander-in-Chief of Defence Services—the leader of the Tatmadaw—in 2011 and remained in that post through the period of military rule, until stepping down in 2026 to become the President.

Born in Minbu, Min Aung Hlaing studied law at the University of Yangon, then known as Rangoon Arts and Science University, before joining the military. Rising through its ranks, he became Commander-in-Chief of Defence Services by 2011 and a Senior General by 2013. After the 2015 general election saw the National League for Democracy (NLD) assume power, he worked to ensure the military's continued role in politics and forestalled the peace process with ethnic armed organizations. A United Nations fact-finding mission found he orchestrated the Rohingya genocide, for which the International Criminal Court is formally considering issuing an arrest warrant against him. He maintained an adversarial relationship with democratically elected State Counsellor Aung San Suu Kyi of the NLD, though she defended him against genocide charges. Min Aung Hlaing baselessly claimed widespread voting irregularities and electoral fraud in the 2020 general election, in which the NLD won a landslide re-election. He then seized power from Aung San Suu Kyi in the 2021 coup d'état. With the outbreak of mass protests against his rule, Min Aung Hlaing ordered a clampdown and suppression of demonstrations, sparking an ongoing civil war.

Min Aung Hlaing's forces have employed scorched earth tactics in the civil war, including airstrikes on civilians. He has ordered the execution of prominent pro-democracy activists, the first use of the death penalty in decades. In 2023, he passed an election law that heavily favored the military-backed USDP and used the law as a pretext to ban the NLD. In 2024, he activated Myanmar's conscription law to draft 60,000 young people into the Tatmadaw. In foreign policy, he has resisted influence from the Association of Southeast Asian Nations (ASEAN) and relied on greater cooperation with Russia, China, and India. In response to his human rights abuses and corruption, Min Aung Hlaing and his government have been subjected to an extensive series of international sanctions, returning Myanmar to its former status as a pariah state. He oversaw the heavily controlled 2025–26 general election that officially showed a landslide USDP victory. Afterwards, he stepped down as Commander-in-Chief of Defence Services and was elected by the Pyidaungsu Hluttaw as the president of Myanmar, leading the transition to a nominally civilian government.

== Early life and education ==
Min Aung Hlaing was born on 3 July 1956 in Minbu, Magway Region, Burma (now Myanmar), to Khin Hlaing and Hla Mu, as the fourth of five children. His parents were teachers from Dawei, in Tanintharyi Region. His family moved to Mandalay for work when he was 5 years old. His father, Khin Hlaing, was an artist.

Min Aung Hlaing passed his matriculation exam in 1972 at Basic Education High School No. 1 Latha (BEHS 1 Latha) of Rangoon (now Yangon). He attended and studied law at the Rangoon Arts and Science University from 1973 to 1974. On his third attempt, he was admitted to the Defence Services Academy in 1974 as part of the 19th Intake, and he graduated in 1977. According to classmates, Min Aung Hlaing was taciturn, and an unremarkable cadet. He was reportedly shunned by classmates because of his reserved personality.

== Military service ==
Following graduation from the Defence Services Academy (DSA) in 1977 with the 19th intake, Min Aung Hlaing went on to serve in different command positions, rising slowly through the ranks. He was assigned to the No. (313) Light Infantry Battalion (Hmawbi), then known as the No. (1) Shan Rifle Battalion, under the command of the No. (77) Light Infantry Division. Former president of Myanmar Thein Sein was also assigned to this battalion, and former Director of Defence Service Intelligence General Khin Nyunt served as a company commander in the same unit.

Early in his career, military colleagues gave him a nickname referring to cat feces, "something deposited quietly but leaving a powerful stink."

In 1979, during an offensive known as Operation Min Yan Aung (Victorious King) against the Communist Party of Burma (CPB) in what is now Matman Township in Wa State, east of the Thanlwin River, Min Aung Hlaing served as an Intelligence Officer (IO) ranked as a Lieutenant (2 stars) at 23 years old.

In 1989, as a Captain (3 stars), Min Aung Hlaing took part in the Battle of Wan Kha Thit, better known as the Battle of Kawmoora. This battle was a clash between army troops controlled by then Commander-in-chief Senior General Than Shwe and the Karen National Union (KNU). Due to the base's difficult position to attack, the Myanmar military repeatedly assaulted it throughout 1989 but failed to seize it, halting operations in 1990 after suffering hundreds of casualties.

To ward off harm from enemy shells and bullets, Min Aung Hlaing carried a Buddha statue in his bag of topographic maps worn across his chest. Despite making speeches for officer cadets to be brave soldiers like him, he never led any missions against KNU troops.

Min Aung Hlaing served as a Battalion Officer Commanding, ranked as a Major, at the No. (369) Light Infantry Battalion (Homalin) under the Regional Operations Command (Kalay) of the Northwestern Regional Military Command. During his service, he imprisoned the pregnant wife of a sergeant who was deemed to have deserted the battalion. At that time, the General Officer Commanding of the Regional Operations Command (Kalay) was Brigadier General Thura Aung Ko, and the Tactical Operation Command Officer Commanding was Colonel Kyaw Thu. During an inspection, Colonel Kyaw Thu discovered the woman locked in the battalion prison and questioned Major Min Aung Hlaing why he did such a thing. Min Aung Hlaing explained that she was imprisoned because her husband had deserted. Colonel Kyaw Thu responded, "Do not do such a disgraceful thing. It's nonsense to arrest the wife just because her husband deserted. Release her now." The woman was only released thanks to Colonel Kyaw Thu's intervention.

Min Aung Hlaing served as the 19th rector of the Defence Services Academy (DSA), having graduated from its 19th intake. During his tenure, he was involved in an incident with Nay Shwe Thway Aung (also known as Phoe La Pyae), the 8-year-old grandson of Senior General Than Shwe. Nay Shwe Thway Aung visited the academy with a colonel acting as his personal bodyguard. At Nay Shwe Thway Aung's request, Min Aung Hlaing organized a football match, dismissing the Officer Cadets from their Physical Training (PT) session. Throughout the match, Min Aung Hlaing frequently inquired about Nay Shwe Thway Aung's well-being, contrasting with his usually strict demeanor towards the officers on the field.

Min Aung Hlaing was also known for his strict enforcement of military regulations. He reported several coaches and cadets to the Military Appointment General (MAG) for minor infractions, such as not wearing helmets while riding motorcycles. These actions were perceived as efforts to secure his promotion to Major General and to obtain a position as a General Officer Commanding as a Regional Military Command. As a result of his reports, the officers and cadets faced significant career setbacks, with many unable to advance beyond the rank of Captain.

As he rose through the ranks, Min Aung Hlaing earned a reputation as a hardliner. His military work earned him the favour of Senior General Than Shwe. Min Aung Hlaing is characterized as having a "big man" management style not conducive to collaboration or listening.

In 2002, he was promoted to commander of the Triangle Regional Military Command in eastern Shan State and was a central figure in negotiations with two rebel groups, the United Wa State Army (UWSA) and the National Democratic Alliance Army (NDAA). Min Aung Hlaing was reportedly close with former Thai prime minister and a General Prem Tinsulanonda, considering Prem a father figure.

Min Aung Hlaing supported the military crackdown of the Saffron Revolution in 2008. He rose to prominence in 2009 after leading an offensive against the insurgent Myanmar Nationalities Democratic Alliance Army (MNDAA) in Kokang. In June 2010, Min Aung Hlaing replaced General Shwe Mann as Joint Chief of Staff of the Army, Navy, and Air Force.

=== Corruption ===
Min Aung Hlaing has been the subject of controversy for his family's extensive business assets and potential conflicts of interest. He is a major shareholder in the army-owned Myanma Economic Holdings Limited (MEHL). During the 2010–11 fiscal year, he had owned 5,000 shares and received an annual dividend of $250,000 (~$359,757 in 2025). He sits on MEHL's Patron Group, which runs the conglomerate.

Min Aung Hlaing's son, Aung Pyae Sone, owns a number of companies, including Sky One Construction Company and Aung Myint Mo Min Insurance Company. He also has a majority stake in Mytel, a national telecoms carrier. In 2013, his son Aung Pyae Sone won a no-bid government permit well below market rates, for a 30-year lease on land at the Yangon People's Square and Park for a high-end restaurant and art gallery, following his father's promotion to Commander-in-Chief. Aung Pyae Sone also runs A&M Mahar, which offers Food and Drug Administration (FDA) approvals and customs clearance services for drugs and medical devices. Myanmar's customs department is led by Kyaw Htin, a former MEHL director.

His daughter Khin Thiri Thet Mon founded a major film studio, 7th Sense Creation, in 2017. That same year, his daughter-in-law, Myo Yadanar Htaik, founded another entertainment company, Stellar Seven Entertainment. The US Embassy in Yangon came under media scrutiny in December 2020, for collaborating with 7th Sense Creation, because Min Aung Hlaing is technically subject to US economic sanctions.

== Commander-in-chief (2011–2026) ==
=== 2011–2015: Union Solidarity and Development Party rule ===
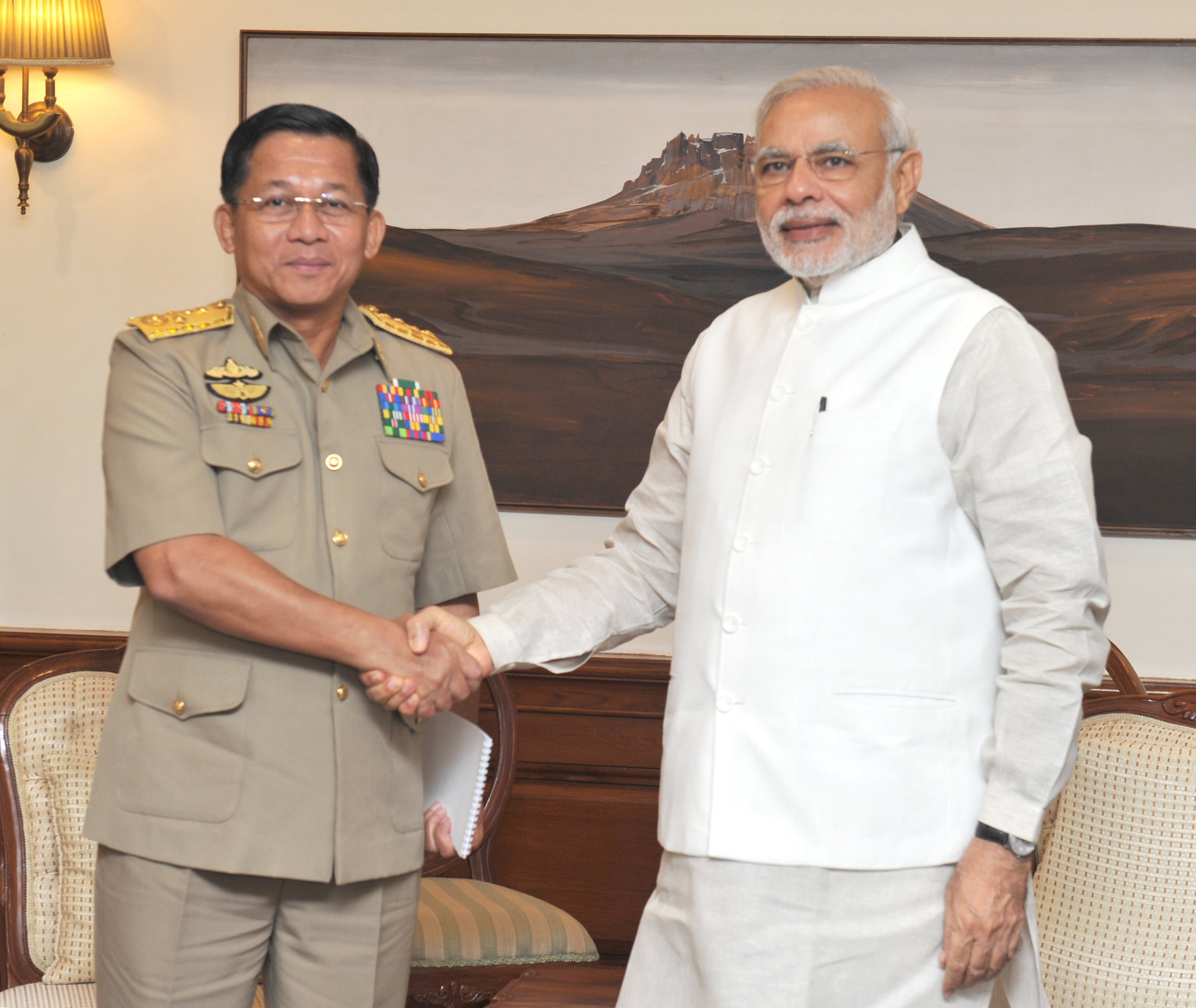
Min Aung Hlaing meeting with Indian prime minister Narendra Modi in New Delhi on 29 July 2015

In the lead-up to 2011, the military began embarking on a series of political reforms to transition Myanmar to a quasi-democracy. The ruling junta, the State Peace and Development Council (SPDP), engineered its formal departure from power, after holding the 2010 Myanmar general election, which was won by the Union Solidarity and Development Party (USDP), the military's proxy party. On 30 March 2011, outgoing head of state, Senior General Than Shwe, then the incumbent Commander-in-Chief of Myanmar's Armed Forces, appointed Min Aung Hlaing as his successor, ahead of more senior officers. Min Aung Hlaing's appointment coincided with the USDP's rise to power, during which he oversaw a series of military reforms, and supported efforts by the USDP-led government to strike peace deals with ethnic armed organisations.

Not long after becoming Commander-in-chief, he removed the Adjutant General, Lieutenant General Kyaw Phyo and General Officer Commanding of Central Regional Military Command Major General Tin Ngwe and built the atmosphere of fear among the top brass.

In November 2011, according to The Irrawaddy, it was "widely believed" that following Min Aung Hlaing's meetings with Chinese military officials that month and his leadership in creating a bilateral agreement on defense cooperation with the Chinese, he had also held talks with Chinese vice-president Xi Jinping regarding cooperation from China with respect to the Kachin Conflict.

On 27 March 2012, during a speech in Naypyidaw, Min Aung Hlaing defended the military's continued role in national politics. On 3 April 2012, the Government of Myanmar announced that Min Aung Hlaing had been promoted to vice-senior general (four-star general), the second highest rank in the Myanmar Armed Forces. He was promoted to the rank of senior general (five-star general), the highest rank in the Myanmar's Armed Forces in March 2013.

In 2014, as Min Aung Hlaing approached the age of 60, which is the mandatory age of retirement for military officers, the Armed Forces' Department of Defence Council issued a directive, enabling Min Aung Hlaing to extend his mandatory retirement age to 65, in 2021.

In August 2015, the USDP fractured, and President Thein Sein purged the faction led by Shwe Mann, a former general and Speaker of the Pyithu Hluttaw. Min Aung Hlaing oversaw a direct military intervention to oust Shwe Mann from power, indicating the military's desire to continue furthering its agenda through USDP. Shwe Mann had advocated for legislation and constitutional amendments that would have decreased the military's influence, against the interests of the military and USDP.

=== 2016–2020: Transition to National League for Democracy rule ===
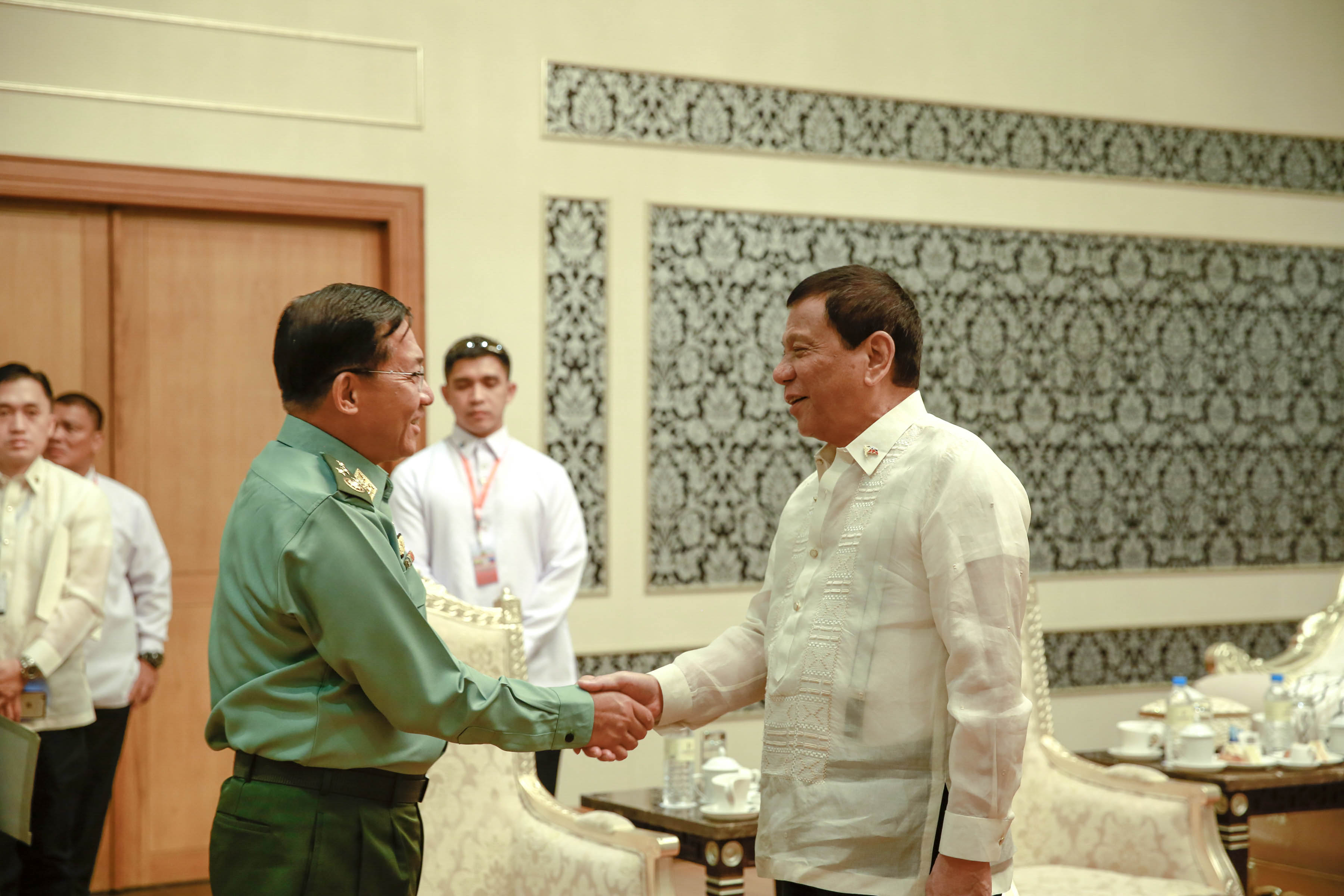
Min Aung Hlaing meeting with Philippine president Rodrigo Duterte in Nay Pyi Taw, Myanmar on 20 March 2017

The 2015 Myanmar general election saw the National League for Democracy (NLD), led by Aung San Suu Kyi, win in a landslide. With the transition from an USDP to NLD-led government, Min Aung Hlaing shifted his priorities to recovering state power for the military establishment. His intransigence and refusal to cooperate with the civilian-led government undermined progress toward Myanmar's peace process. As the NLD assumed power, Min Aung Hlaing began intensifying an ongoing military crackdown on the Rohingya, beginning in October 2016. He maintained an adversarial relationship with democratically elected State Counsellor Aung San Suu Kyi, though she defended him against genocide charges. At the Union Peace Conference - 21st Century Panglong in August 2020, he warned the NLD against scapegoating the military for its role in the ongoing ethnic conflicts.

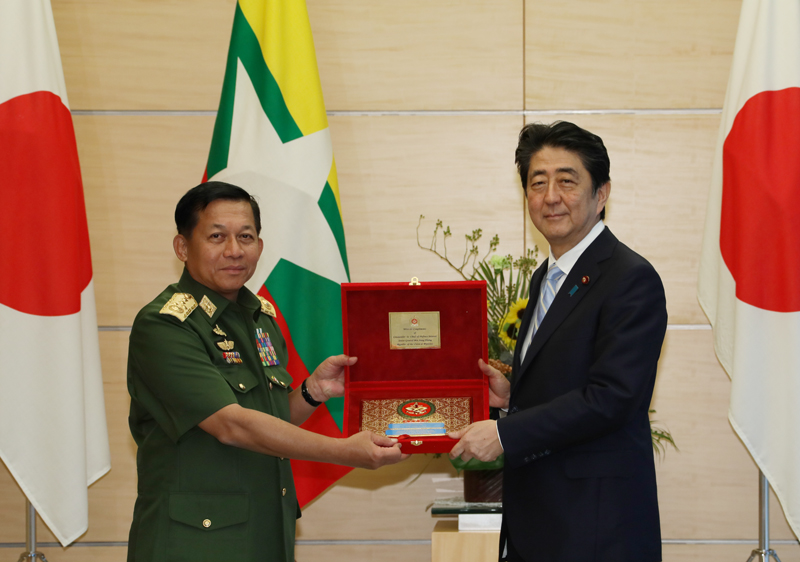
Min Aung Hlaing meeting with Japanese prime minister Shinzō Abe in Tokyo, 4 August 2017

Min Aung Hlaing also began to signal his interest in civilian politics. He began assuming a more statesman-like persona, and became increasingly assertive about the military's role. In the lead-up to the 2020 Myanmar general election, he worked with the USDP to position himself as the next President. Throughout 2019, Min Aung Hlaing made several public appearances dubbed a "charm offensive," at several religious sites and charity functions, raising speculation about his political ambitions. To cultivate his public persona, he began two Facebook pages that commanded a combined following of 4.1 million followers. In January 2020, Min Aung Hlaing met with Chinese leader Xi Jinping in Nay Pyi Taw. Xi promoted the practical cooperation under the framework of the One Belt One Road to achieve results at an early date and benefit Myanmar's people. In May 2020, Min Aung Hlaing reshuffled senior military ranks, promoting a new generation of officers loyal to him, including Kyaw Swar Lin, who became the military's youngest lieutenant general.

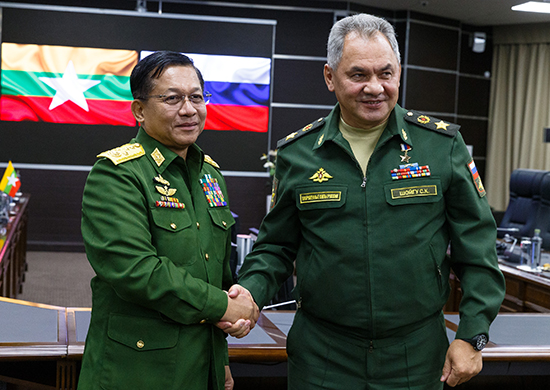
Min Aung Hlaing meeting with Russian defense minister Sergei Shoigu, 17 August 2019

War with the Arakan Army intensified during this period, and the military was accused of targeting Arakanese civilians and their properties. On 17 March 2019, Kyaw Zaw Oo, an Arakanese MP, published a bilingual open letter to Min Aung Hlaing about the many human rights violations of the Tatmadaw in Rakhine State that harmed the lives and property of civilians and damaged buildings of cultural heritage.

In February 2020, Min Aung Hlaing, his wife Kyu Kyu Hla and with his close astrologer Vasipake Sayadaw placed the "Hti" umbrella atop Bagan's most powerful ancient Htilominlo Temple. The meaning of the temple name is "need the royal umbrella, need the King". He was following in the footsteps of some of Myanmar's most powerful political figures including his predecessor, Senior General Than Shwe. Many people believed that the ceremony was a yadaya and seeking divine blessings for his glory.

In November 2020, Min Aung Hlaing made a series of public comments questioning the legitimacy of the upcoming 2020 election, in potential violation of the Civil Services Personnel Law. On 5 November, the Tatmadaw declared that Min Aung Hlaing's rank is equivalent to Vice President of Myanmar. After casting his ballot in the 2020 election, Min Aung Hlaing vowed to accept the election results. The 2020 election saw NLD win in a larger landslide than in 2015, forestalling Min Aung Hlaing's political ambitions. Min would have been required to retire as Commander-in-Chief of Defence Services due to a statutory age limit. In response, the military began intensifying allegations of electoral fraud and irregularities, submitting formal complaints to the Union Election Commission (UEC).

=== Retirement ===
Min Aung Hlaing retired on 30 March 2026, after Union Solidarity and Development Party MP Kyaw Kyaw Htay of the Pyithu Hluttaw committee put his name forward for the committee's nomination for the 2026 Myanmar presidential election. He was required to retire from the military and thus step down as commander-in-chief to run for president under the constitution. The NDSC appointed Ye Win Oo, a Min Aung Hlaing loyalist, to succeed him.

== Military leader (2021–2026) ==
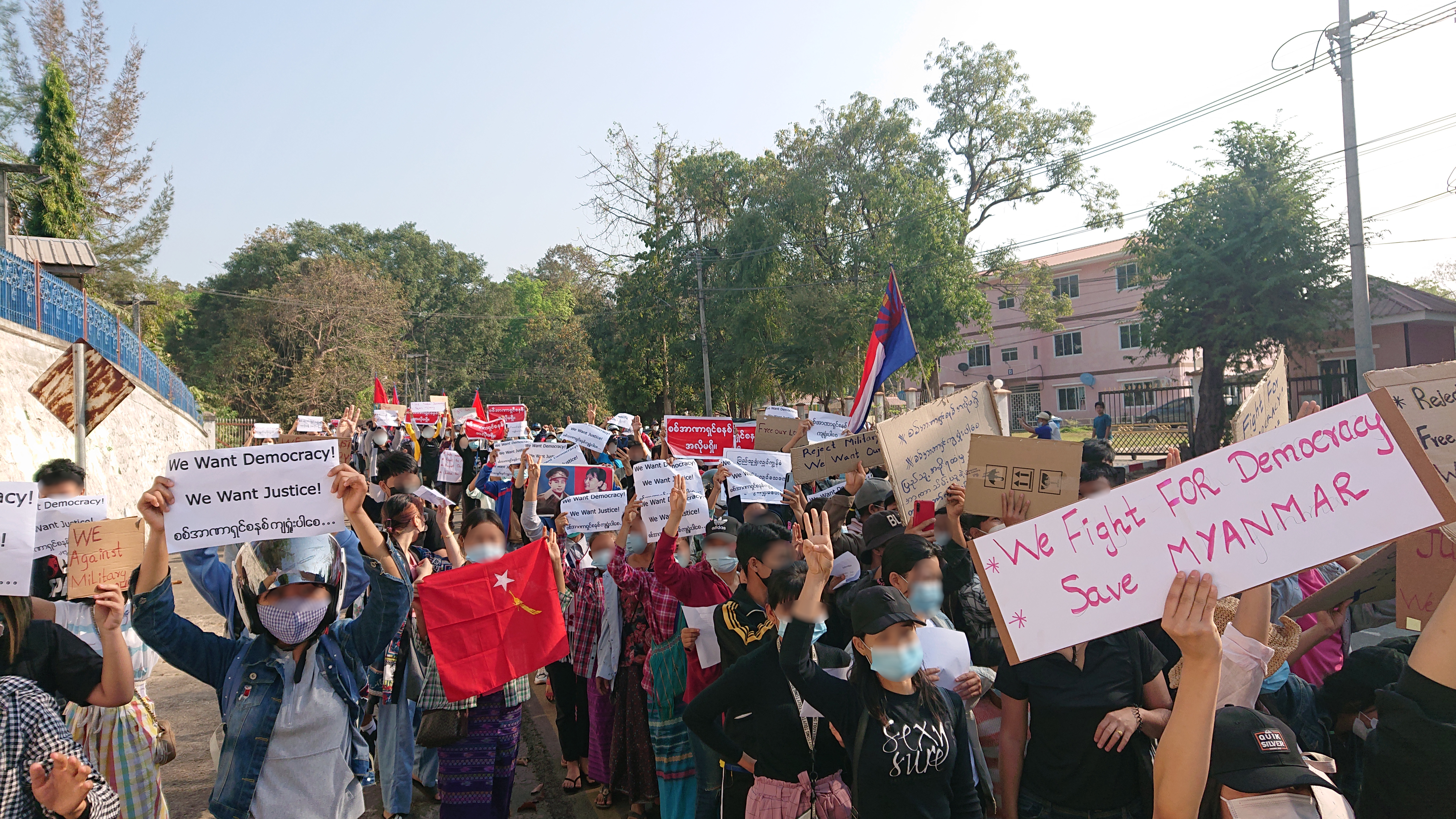
Demonstration against the military coup in Hpa-an, Kayin State, Myanmar, 9 February 2021

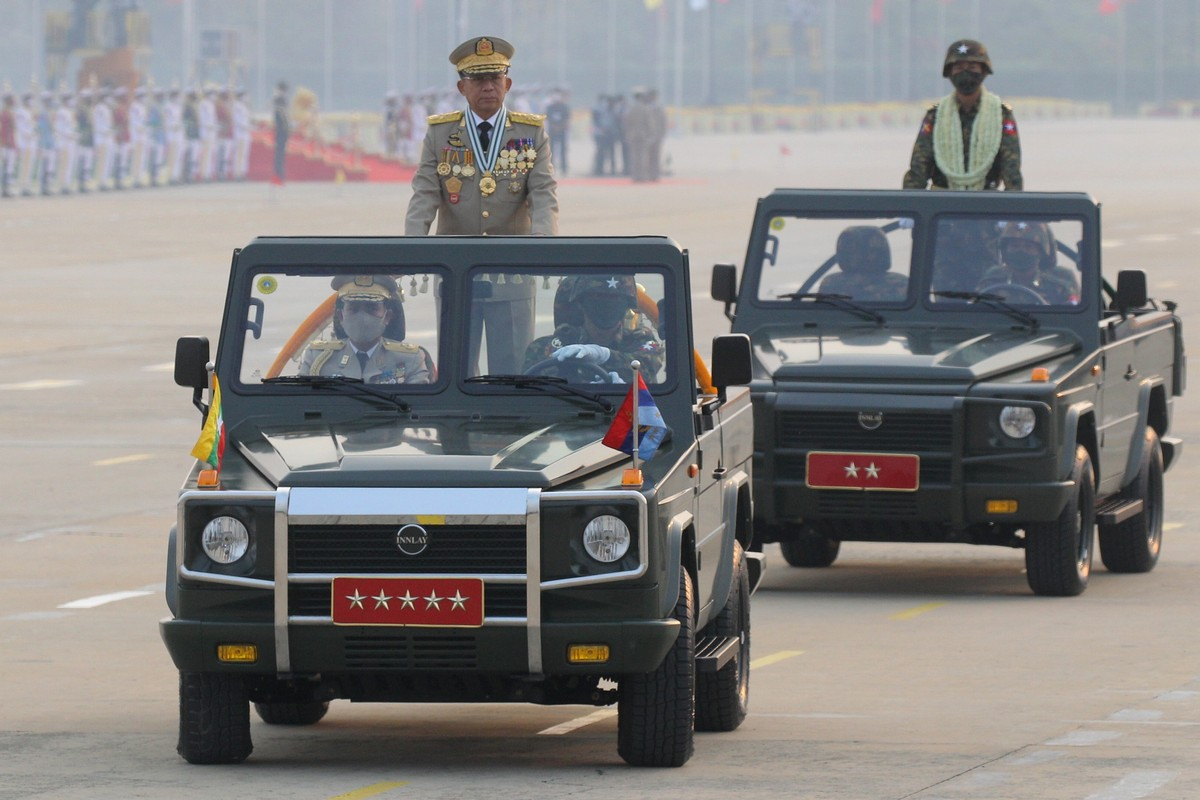
Min Aung Hlaing during the Tatmadaw's 76th anniversary day on 27 March 2021

On 27 January 2021, Min Aung Hlaing publicly remarked that he would not rule out a coup d'état and abolition of the constitution, if allegations of voter fraud during last year's election were not adequately addressed. These comments sparked concern about another potential coup. The following day, the UEC issued a statement rejecting claims of electoral fraud, citing the lack of evidence submitted to substantiate these claims. On 29 January, the military issued clarifying statements pledging to protect and abide by the constitution and applicable laws.

On 1 February 2021, Min Aung Hlaing detained elected leaders including President Win Myint, State Counsellor Aung San Suu Kyi and declared himself as Commander-in-chief of Myanmar, one day before democratically elected members of parliament were scheduled to be sworn in as members of the Pyidaungsu Hluttaw (Assembly of the Union). The following day, he established the State Administration Council (SAC) as the country's interim ruling body.

On 22 May 2021, Min Aung Hlaing gave his first interview since the coup to Hong Kong-based Chinese language Phoenix Television. During the interview, he referred to deposed leader Aung San Suu Kyi and he said that she "is in good health. She is at her home and healthy. She is going to face trial at the court in a few days." On the same day, Myanmar Now reported that shortly after the coup, Min Aung Hlaing appointed himself indefinitely as the commander-in-chief and therefore the de facto leader of Myanmar.

Six months after the coup, on 1 August 2021, Min Aung Hlaing formed a caretaker government and established himself as the country's prime minister. He also remained as the chairman of the SAC until its dissolution.

=== Myanmar civil war ===
With the outbreak of mass protests against his rule, Min Aung Hlaing ordered a clampdown and suppression of demonstrations, sparking an ongoing civil war.

Min Aung Hlaing's forces have employed scorched earth tactics in the civil war, including airstrikes on civilians. He has ordered the execution of prominent pro-democracy activists, the first use of the death penalty in decades. After four pro-democracy activists were executed on 24 July 2022, the chairman of the ASEAN, Hun Sen, UN representatives, and Western leaders condemned the executions.

In foreign policy, he has resisted influence from Association of Southeast Asian Nations (ASEAN) and relied on greater cooperation with Russia, China, and India. On 7 September 2022, Min Aung Hlaing met with Russian president Vladimir Putin on the sidelines of the Eastern Economic Forum (EEF), in Vladivostok, Russia, the first time that the pair have met since the 2021 coup. In response to his human rights abuses and corruption, Min Aung Hlaing and his government have been subjected to an extensive series of international sanctions, returning Myanmar to its former status as a pariah state. The Economist Intelligence Unit's 2022 Democracy Index rated Myanmar under Min Aung Hlaing as the second-most authoritarian regime in the world, with only Afghanistan rated less democratic.

Military situation in Myanmar as of 4 February 2025. Areas controlled by the Tatmadaw are highlighted in red.

=== Acting Presidency (2023–2026) ===
In January 2023, Min Aung Hlaing enacted a new electoral law aimed at rigging the next general election in favor of the USDP. He is himself considered a likely USDP nominee for president in the subsequent presidential election.

Min Aung Hlaing refused to give up his emergency powers when they were constitutionally set to expire on 1 February 2023, further delaying new elections.

In March 2023, Min Aung Hlaing made a rare public appearance at the Armed Forces Day parade stating that his government would continue to fight back against resistance groups in the country and their "acts of terror". Hlaing called his critics supporters of terrorism.

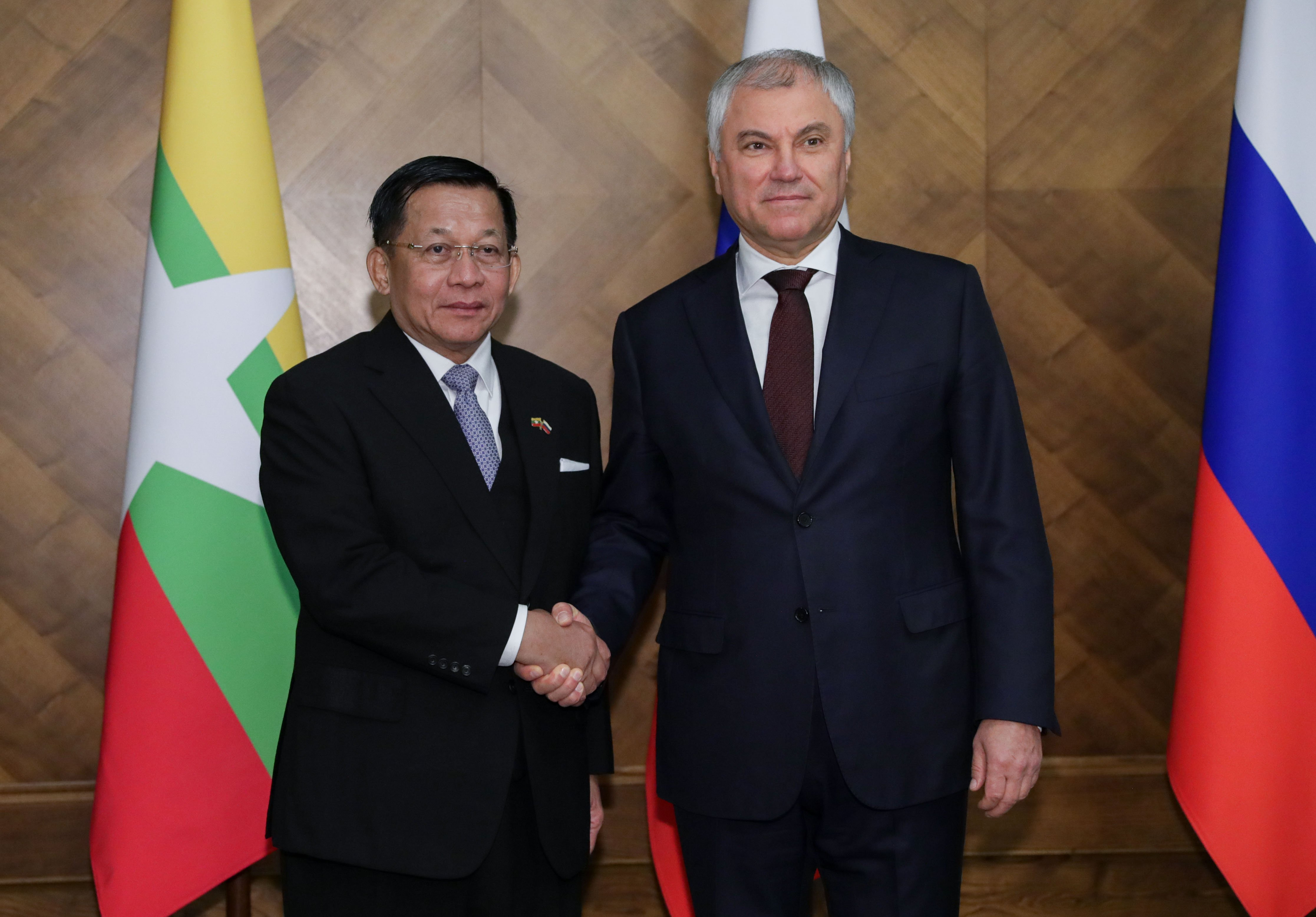
Min Aung Hlaing with Russian State Duma Chairman Vyacheslav Volodin, 4 March 2025

Starting in January 2024, multiple pro-military figures condemned Min Aung Hlaing for incompetence and excessive self-interest after the Tatmadaw suffered an unprecedented string of defeats during Operation 1027. In February 2024, to address the Tatmadaw's personnel issues, Min Aung Hlaing activated Myanmar's 1959 People's Military Service Law for the first time, with plans to draft 60,000 young men and women. Men aged 18–35 and women aged 18–27 will be required to serve up to five years under the state of emergency, or face five years imprisonment.

In March 2024, Min Aung Hlaing claimed at the Armed Forces Day parade young people are being tricked into supporting the resistance against the military, and accused "some powerful nations" of trying to interfere with Myanmar's internal affairs.

On 13 April 2023, Min Aung Hlaing was featured on Time magazine's list of the "100 Most Influential People of 2023".

While attending the Defence Services Academy during Thingyan, the traditional New Year Water Festival on the evening of 14 April 2024, Min Aung Hlaing escaped a rocket attack by the Mandalay People's Defence Force (MDY-PDF).

According to SAC media, resistance groups in Yangon attempted to assassinate Min Aung Hlaing with explosives and firearms in June 2024.

On 22 July 2024 Min Aung Hlaing became acting president after Myint Swe took medical leave.

Min Aung Hlaing ordered the arrest of Nay Soe Maung, the son-in-law of Senior General Than Shwe, on 23 October 2024 in Pyigyitagun Township, Mandalay. This arrest occurred during the ongoing challenges to his rule following the coup. The groundwork for such actions against opposition figures was laid by Than Shwe, whose enduring influence over the military had previously established its stronghold in Myanmar's political landscape.

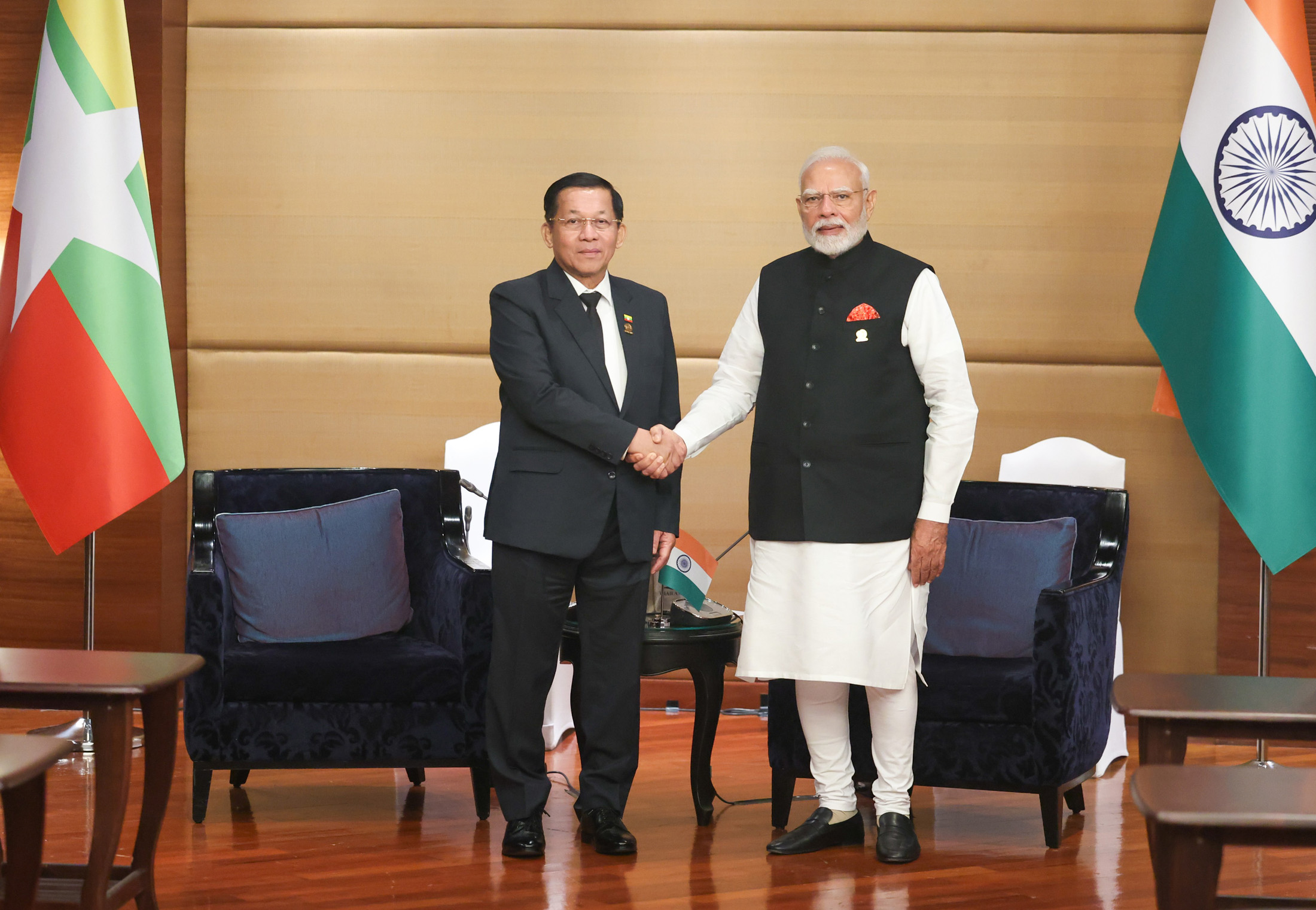
Min Aung Hlaing with Indian prime minister Narendra Modi, 3 April 2025

In January 2025, ASEAN upheld its decision to ban Min Aung Hlaing from attending its summits and limit Myanmar's participation to a non-political level.

On 31 January 2025, Myanmar's ruling military extended the state of emergency for another six months, with the decision approved unanimously by the National Defense and Security Council (NDSC) under Section 425 of the 2008 Constitution. Min Aung Hlaing, as chairman of the council, stated that maintaining stability remained necessary before elections could be held.

The state of emergency, first declared following the February 2021 military takeover, has been extended multiple times. Under Myanmar's constitutional framework, elections cannot be conducted while a state of emergency is in place. The military has previously announced plans to hold elections in 2025, though the latest extension means they cannot take place until at least the second half of the year.

Min Aung Hlaing made an official visit to Moscow on 3 March 2025 at Putin's invitation, holding talks at the Grand Kremlin Palace the following day. During this visit, they oversaw the signing of ten memorandums of understanding covering sectors such as nuclear energy, space exploration, trade, education, and investment. An agreement was also reached to build a small-scale nuclear power plant in Myanmar, starting with a capacity of 110 megawatts and potential expansion. Additionally, a memorandum on space exploration and satellite technology led to reports of a satellite imagery analysis center being established in Myanmar with Russian support. Min Aung Hlaing expressed gratitude for Russia's support in international forums and reiterated Myanmar's backing for Russia's actions in Ukraine. Putin also invited him to attend the Victory Day celebrations in Moscow on 9 May 2025.

During a meeting with Russian president Vladimir Putin at the Kremlin on March 4, 2025, Min Aung Hlaing claimed that the Buddha had prophesied Putin's rise to power. According to Min Aung Hlaing, the prophecy foretold that a figure, referred to as the "rat king," would emerge as the emperor of the Russian people after the year 2000 of the Buddhist calendar and become a key ally to the kings of Burma. He recounted the story behind the prophecy:

"During the time of our Lord Buddha, when a rat king named Thawma dug up tubers and offered them to the Buddha, the Buddha smiled. When asked why he smiled, the Lord Buddha replied that the rat king Thawma would be reborn as the emperor of the Russian people, one of the 12 Western peoples, during the reign of King Pāpa after the year 2000 of the Buddhist era. He would be unrivaled in the art of weaponry, a unique weapons master emperor, and would become a close and friendly ally of the Burmese kings."

— Min Aung Hlaing

Min Aung Hlaing then connected the prophecy to contemporary geopolitics, stating that the current strategic alliance between Russia and Myanmar, and that Russia has achieved a world-leading position in weapons and technology. Therefore, the Buddha's prophecy had come true "in a remarkably coincidental and wonderful way". He also presented President Putin with a copy of the book U Aung Zeya's Biography, written in 1838 by the Pali scholar U Saw, which contains references to the Rat King.

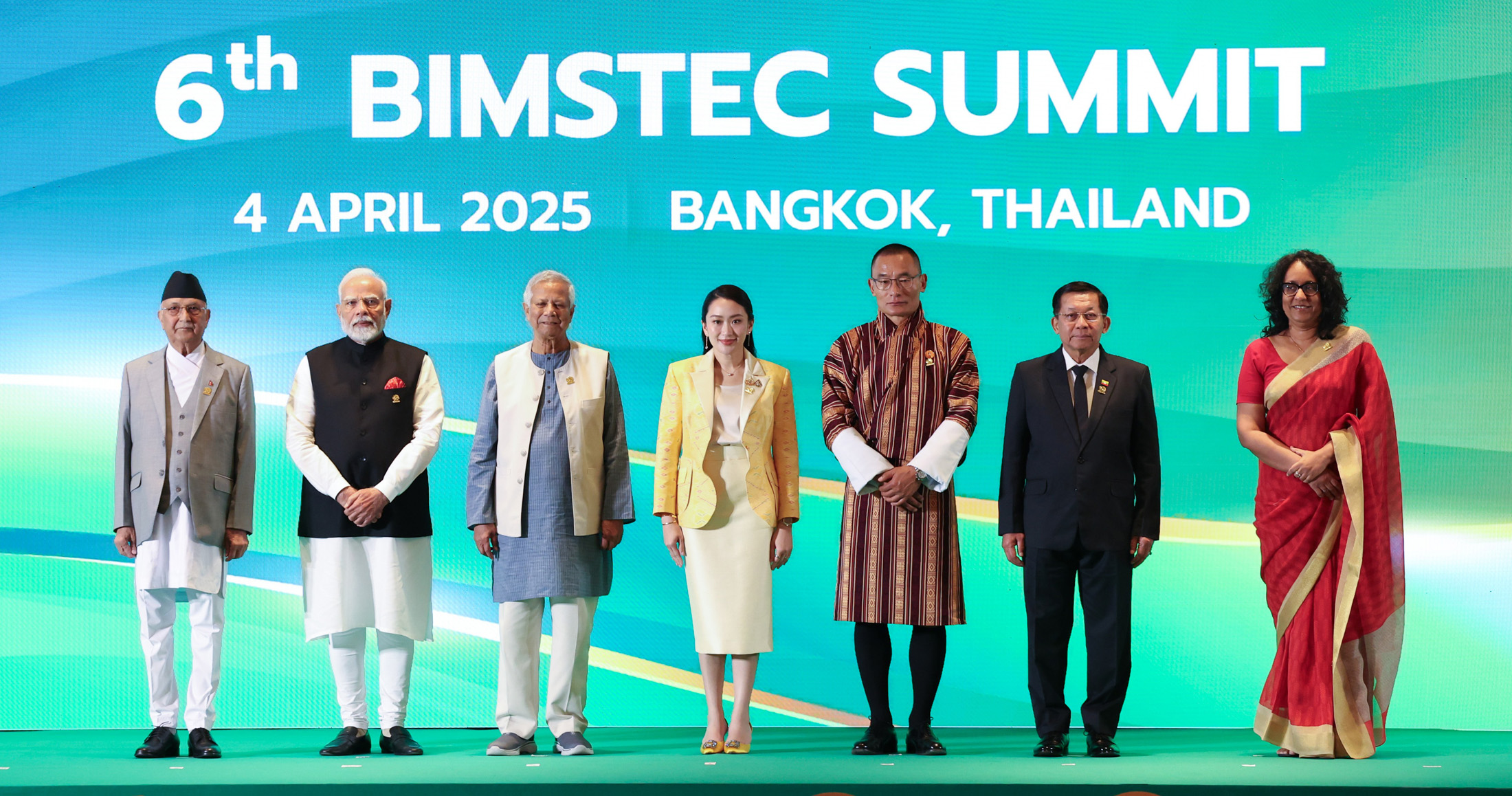
Min Aung Hlaing at the BIMSTEC summit in Bangkok, Thailand, 4 April 2025

On 27 March 2025, during the 80th anniversary of Myanmar Armed Forces Day, Min Aung Hlaing said that a general election would be held by the end of the year, pledging that the military would hand over power to the winning party in a structured and lawful manner.

Following the 2025 Myanmar earthquake on 28 March, Min Aung Hlaing made a rare invitation for other countries and international organizations to provide relief to Myanmar. On 3 April, he visited Thailand to attend the BIMSTEC summit in Bangkok.

On 20 March 2026, Min Aung Hlaing underwent surgery at the No. 2 Military Hospital in Naypyidaw due to lumbar spondylosis with spinal stenosis. He publicly appeared during a 24 March meeting where he urged Thingyan festivals to continue despite fuel shortages.

== Presidency (2026–present) ==
On 30 March 2026, he was nominated for the vice presidency by the Electoral College of the Pyithu Hluttaw by the Union Solidarity and Development Party MP Kyaw Kyaw Htay for the committee's nomination for the 2026 Myanmar presidential election. As he was required to retire from the military, he stepped down as commander-in-chief on the same day to run for president under the constitution. The NDSC appointed Ye Win Oo, a Min Aung Hlaing loyalist, to succeed him. On 3 April, Min Aung Hlaing was elected the country's 11th president with 429 of 584 votes, while Nyo Saw of the Tatmadaw and Nan Ni Ni Aye of the Amyotha Hluttaw were elected vice presidents. On April 10, 2026, Min Aung Hlaing took the official oath of office at the Pyidaungsu Hluttaw. That same day, he established a new Union Government of Myanmar, appointing many individuals who had served in his previous ministries.

=== Foreign policy ===
From 30 May to 3 June, Min embarked on a visit to India, his first trip overseas after being inaugurated as president. During the visit, he met with Prime Minister Narendra Modi, President Droupadi Murmu and other top officials. From 15 to 19 June, he visited China, his second trip overseas. During his visit, he met with Chinese leader Xi Jinping, Premier Li Qiang and National People's Congress Standing Committee Chairman Zhao Leji. He also visited Shanghai, where he attended the Myanmar‑China Investment and Trade Networking Summit.

Since becoming president, he has also visited five ASEAN countries; Thailand, Laos, Cambodia, Vietnam, and Malaysia.

== War crimes ==
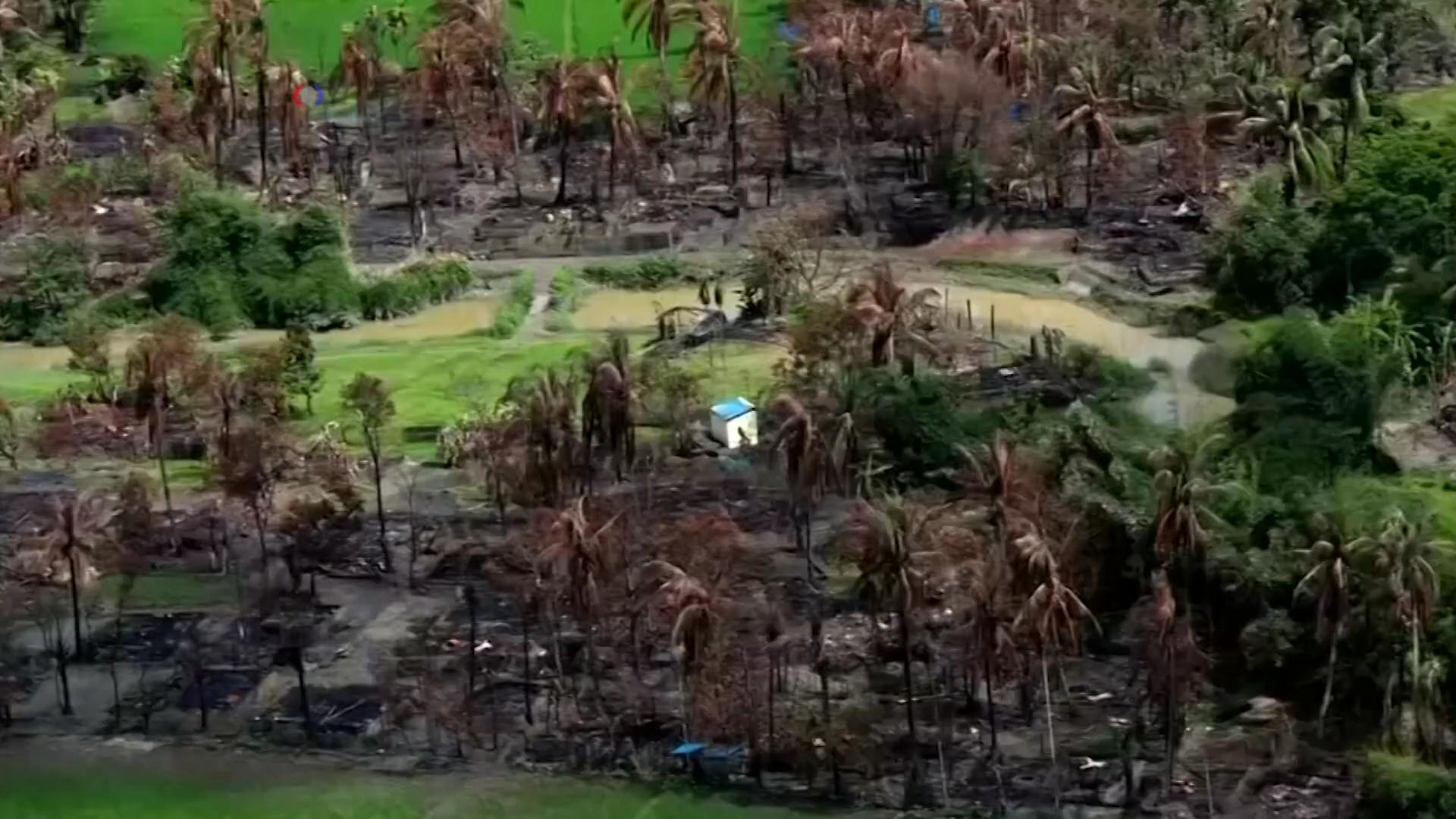
Destroyed village in Rakhine State, September 2017

The United Nations Human Rights Council (UNHRC) reported that Min Aung Hlaing's soldiers have been deliberately targeting civilians in northern states of Myanmar and have been committing systemic discrimination and human rights violations against minority communities in Rakhine State. In particular, he has been accused of ethnic cleansing against the Rohingya people. These human rights violations could amount to genocide, crimes against humanity, and war crimes.

In 2018, the United Nations Independent International Fact-Finding Mission on Myanmar, led by Marzuki Darusman, determined that Min Aung Hlaing and other Myanmar's military generals oversaw atrocities against the Rohingya in Rakhine, Kachin and Shan states, and did so with genocidal intent. The UN investigative panel said that Min Aung Hlaing, along with four other commanders (Soe Win, Aung Kyaw Zaw, Maung Maung Soe, and Than Oo) should be tried for war crimes and crimes against humanity (including genocide) in the International Criminal Court (ICC) or an ad hoc international tribunal.

Facebook banned Min Aung Hlaing from its platform along with 19 other top Burmese officials and organisations to prevent further heated ethnic and religious tensions in Myanmar. This action followed a UN investigation's report that certain military leaders in Myanmar should be investigated and prosecuted for genocide against Rohingya Muslims. Twitter later banned him on 16 May 2019.

The United States has imposed sanctions against Min Aung Hlaing. In July 2019, the U.S. government banned him from travel to the US. In December 2020, it froze Min Aung Hlaing's American-based assets and criminalized financial transactions between him and anyone in the US.

=== Arrest warrant request ===
In November 2024, as part of the International Criminal Court investigation in Bangladesh/Myanmar, the prosecutor of the ICC, Karim Ahmad Khan, requested an arrest warrant for Min Aung Hlaing, stating that there were reasonable grounds to believe that Hlaing was responsible for crimes against humanity for his role in the genocide.

On 14 February 2025, a court in Argentina, acting on a petition from the Burmese Rohingya Organisation UK and citing the principle of universal jurisdiction, issued arrest warrants against Min Aung Hlaing and other senior Myanmar officials on charges of "genocide and crimes against humanity" against the Rohingyas. In response, Myanmar military spokesperson Major General Zaw Min Tun rejected the ruling, calling it "baseless" and accusing Argentina's judiciary of political interference. He defended Min Aung Hlaing, asserting that the accusations were politically motivated and lacked legitimacy.

== Sanctions ==
The U.S. Department of the Treasury has imposed sanctions on Min Aung Hlaing since 10 December 2019, pursuant to Executive Order 13818, which builds upon and implements the Global Magnitsky Human Rights Accountability Act and targets perpetrators of serious human rights abuse and corruption. He has committed serious human rights abuses against members of ethnic minorities across Myanmar. The US sanctions include a freezing of assets under the US and a ban on transactions with any US person. In 2022, he was also placed on the sanctions list of the OFAC pursuant to Executive Order 14014, in response to the 2–21 coup. OFAC also sanctioned some of the companies that Hlaing and/or his associates owned or controlled, including the MEC conglomerate headed by Hlaing.

The Government of Canada has imposed sanctions on him since 18 February 2021, pursuant to Special Economic Measures Act and Special Economic Measures (Burma) Regulations, in response to the gravity of the human rights and humanitarian situation in Myanmar. Canadian sanctions include a freezing of assets and a ban on transactions with any Canadian person.

HM Treasury and the Foreign, Commonwealth and Development Office of the United Kingdom have imposed sanctions on him since 25 February 2021, for his responsibility for serious human rights violations in Myanmar. The UK sanctions include a freezing of assets under the UK and travel ban to the UK.

The Council of the European Union has also imposed sanctions on him since 22 March 2021, pursuant to Council Regulation (EU) 2021/479 and Council Implementing Regulation (EU) 2021/480 which amended Council Regulation (EU) No 401/2013, for his responsibility for the 2021 coup and the subsequent military and police repression against peaceful demonstrators. The EU sanctions include a freezing of assets and a ban on entry or transit to the bloc.

== Personal life ==
Min Aung Hlaing married Kyu Kyu Hla, a retired lecturer, in 1980. He has a son Aung Pyae Sone and a daughter Khin Thiri Thet Mon.

== Political positions ==
Reportedly Min Aung Hlaing is a supporter of Ne Win and the Burmese Way to Socialism, while formerly supporting privatization.

== Promotions ==
- Major General – 2008/2009
- Lieutenant General – Late 2009
- General – Early 2011
- Vice-Senior General – Early 2012
- Senior General – March 2013

== Awards and decorations ==
=== Domestic honors ===
On 17 April 2022, Min Aung Hlaing gave himself Myanmar's two highest titles; the Thadoe Thiri Thudhamma (The Most Glorious Order of Truth) and the Thadoe Maha Thray Sithu (the Order of the Union of Myanmar).

On 7 October 2019, the Young Men's Buddhist Association (YMBA) awarded him the title of Mingaladhamma Zawtika Dhaza and the permanent patron of the YMBA. On 9 December 2020, YMBA awarded him the title of Thado Thiri Agga Maha Mingalar Zawtika.

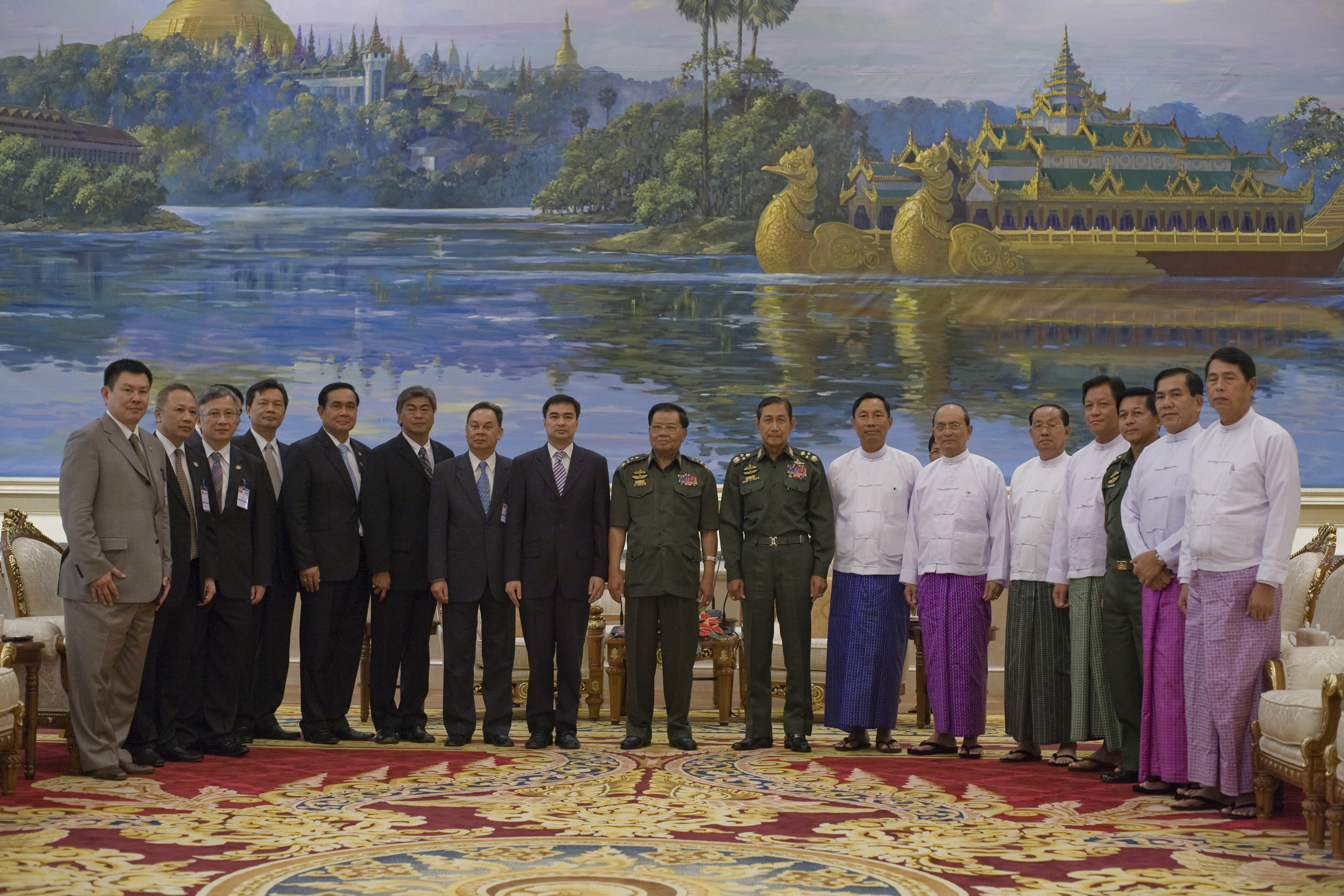
Thai delegation with members of the State Peace and Development Council (SPDC), including Min Aung Hlaing (third from the right), Senior General Than Shwe (first from the right), Vice-Senior General Maung Aye (second from the left), Thura Shwe Mann (to the left of the middle), and Thein Sein (first from the left), at the Zeyathiri Beikman, Naypyidaw on 11 October 2010.

=== Academic titles ===
On 23 June 2020, the Federal Service for Military-Technical Cooperation (FSMTC) awarded an honorary medal to Min Aung Hlaing.

On 20 August 2020, the Military University of the Ministry of Defense of the Russian Federation honoured Min Aung Hlaing the title of Honorary Professor.

On September 4, 2020, the Institute of Oriental Studies of the Russian Academy of Sciences conferred Min Aung Hlaing an honorary doctorate for his performance in strengthening the Russia–Myanmar strategic partnership.

On February 5, 2026, the University of Yangon awarded Min Aung Hlaing an Honorary Doctor of Public Administration degree for his efforts in maintaining stability, economic recovery, and education reform.

=== Foreign honours ===
- 2013 – Thailand: The Most Noble Order of the Crown of Thailand, Knight Grand Cross (1st Class), Thailand
- 2018 – Malaysia: The Most Gallant Order of Military Service, Gallant Commander of the Malaysian Armed Forces (Darjah Panglima Gagah Angkatan Tentera), Honorary Malaysian Armed Forces Order for Valor (1st Degree), Malaysia.
- 2018 – Thailand: The Most Exalted Order of the White Elephant, Knight Grand Cross (1st Class), Thailand
- 2020 – Russia: Medal "For strengthening the military commonwealth" (Ministry of Defense, Russia)
- 2020 – Russia: Badge of Honor of FSMTC "For the Merits in the Field of Military-Technical Cooperation"
- 2023 – Russia: The Order of Alexander Nevsky for "his valuable endeavours to develop multi-sectoral cooperation with the Russian Federation"

== See also ==
- List of current heads of state and government
- List of heads of the executive by approval rating

== Notes ==
Military offices
Preceded by Shwe Mann	Joint Chief of Staff of the Armed Forces; 2010–2011	Succeeded by Hla Htay Win
Preceded by Than Shwe	Commander-in-Chief of Defence Services; 2011–2026	Succeeded by Ye Win Oo
Political offices
Preceded by Aung San Suu Kyi as State Counsellor of Myanmar	Chairman of the State Administration Council; 2021–2025	Office abolished
Vacant Title last held by Thein Sein (2011)	Prime Minister of Myanmar; 2021–2025	Succeeded by Nyo Saw
Preceded by Win Myint	President of Myanmar; 2026–present Acting: 2025–2026	Incumbent
