= Aung Pyae Sone =

Burmese business tycoon

- အောင်ပြည့်စုံ
- Born: 24 June 1984 (age 42); Yangon, Myanmar
- Education: University of Computer Studies, Yangon
- Occupation: Businessman
- Spouse: Myo Yadana Htaik (m. 2012)
- Children: Khin Nyein Chan Pyae Sone Hlaing; Khin Phone Myat Pyae Sone Hlaing; Khin Myitta Pyae Sone Hlaing
- Parent(s): Min Aung Hlaing; Kyu Kyu Hla
- Relatives: Khin Thiri Thet Mon

Aung Pyae Sone (Burmese: အောင်ပြည့်စုံ) is a Burmese business tycoon who owns a number of major companies, including Sky One Construction Company and Aung Myint Mo Min Insurance Company. He is also reportedly the biggest shareholder in national telecoms carrier Mytel. He is the son of Senior General Min Aung Hlaing, the current leader of Myanmar, concurrently serving as Chairman of the State Administration Council and Commander-in-Chief of the Myanmar Armed Forces.

== Early life ==
Aung Pyae Some was born 24 June 1984 in Burma (now Myanmar) to Min Aung Hlaing, and Kyu Kyu Hla, a lecturer.

== Business interests ==
=== Pre-coup beginnings ===
The business interests of Aung Pyae Sone closely tracked the military career trajectory of Min Aung Hlaing, his father. Aung Pyae Sone owns Authentic Group of Companies, which has supplied raw materials to ordnance factories operated by the military's Directorate of Defence Industries since his father's promotion to commander-in-chief in 2011, and to businesses operated by military-owned Myanmar Economic Corporation.

Lieutenant-General Min Naing, the Quartermaster-General, assisted Aung Pyae Sone in leveraging his father’s position to secure projects managed by the military-controlled Myanmar Economic Corporation. Min Naing established the partnership between the Quartermaster-General's Office and Aung Pyae Sone, which led to the creation of Aung Myint Moh Min Insurance. The Burmese military now requires its soldiers to buy life insurance from the firm. Min Naing also introduced Aung Pyae Sone to influential business figures, profiting from these partnerships. Over time, Aung Pyae Sone built his own network of business contacts, no longer needing Min Naing’s guidance. Aung Pyae Sone's companies now earn substantial profits from military-linked purchases and projects, including the procurement of weapons and the supply of military uniforms.

In 2013, Aung Pyae Sone won a no-bid government permit well below market rates, for a 30-year lease on land at the Yangon People's Park for a high-end restaurant and art gallery, following his father's promotion to Commander-in-Chief. Aung Pyae Sone also runs A&M Mahar, which offers Food and Drug Administration (FDA) approvals and customs clearance services for drugs and medical devices.

Aung Pyae Sone was awarded an artificially low land lease from Yangon Region's government and serves alcohol in breach of a Yangon City Development Committee prohibition. He also owns the Kan Tharyar Hospital and Azura Beach Resort, which promotes itself as the largest resort in Chaungtha.

In 2019, United Nations fact-finding missions called for action against companies owned by Aung Pyae Sone.

=== Post-coup expansion ===
The U.S. Department of the Treasury has imposed sanctions on him and his younger sister Khin Thiri Thet Mon since 10 March 2021, pursuant to Executive Order 14014, in response to the Burmese military's coup against the democratically elected civilian government of Myanmar. The sanctions include freezing of assets under the US and a ban on transactions with US persons. He became a major target of a domestic boycott and social punishment by people who oppose the military regime.

Aung Pyae Sone partially owns Golden Future Linkage, a solar power company. In January 2023, the military junta awarded the company a contract to build a 40-megawatt solar power plant in Mandalay Region’s Thazi Township.

In September 2022, Thai authorities arrested Burmese tycoon Tun Min Latt who is closely associated with Min Aung Hlaing and his family, on money laundering and drug trafficking charges, following a raid. The September 2022 raid found assets of Aung Pyae Sone's property title to a four-bedroom luxury condo worth nearly US$1 million in Bangkok's Belle Rama 9 complex, and his sister's bank records.

In 2023, Aung Pyae Sone acquired a stake in an island known as Little Inya, which is adjacent to Yangon University’s Hline campus. He is the biggest shareholder in a luxury condominium, Inno City.

In 2025, Myanmar experienced a major earthquake on 28 March. Aung Pyae Sone's construction firm, Naypyitaw Mark II, was tapped to help rebuild the capital of Naypyidaw.

== Personal life ==
Aung Pyae Sone is married to Myo Yadanar Htike (also spelt Myo Yadana Htaik). He has three daughters, Khin Nyein Chan Pyae Sone Hlaing, Khin Phone Myat Pyae Sone Hlaing, and Khin Myitta Pyae Sone Hlaing.
