= Myanmar peace process =

Attempts to end the internal ethnic armed conflict

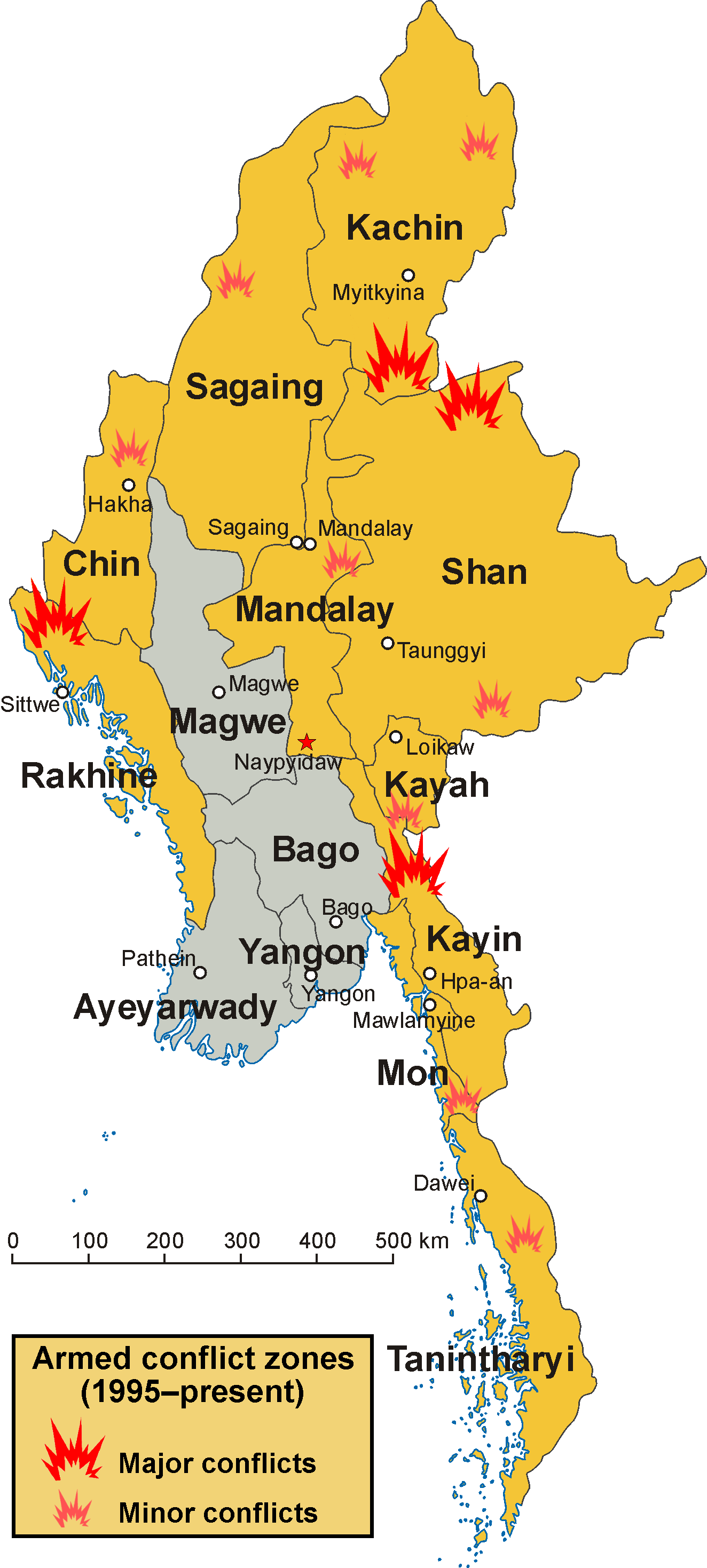
Map highlighting the current zones of conflict in Myanmar.

The Myanmar peace process refers to the nation led discussions aimed at relieving the internal armed conflict that has been simmering in Myanmar since before it gained independence from Britain in 1948. Many of the events that have taken place can be attributed to tensions surrounding the treatment of the numerous different ethnic minorities. This conflict involves both the Myanmar government and military (the Tatmadaw), and the 16 armed ethnic minorities in Myanmar. In recent years tension between the Myanmar government and the military has been increasing, with the military still holding position as the most powerful political force in Myanmar.

Since the National League of Democracy came to power in 2015 under Aung San Suu Kyi, the peace process has been positioned as a major priority of the government to end the conflict. It is a key aspect of the country's transition to democracy, and has involved negotiations amongst the different armed ethnic groups, the Tatmadaw, and the government, culminating in events such as the Panglong Peace Conferences, and National Ceasefire Agreement (NCA). Dr. Sai Oo from the Pyidaungsu Institute states that the peace process, and the road to peace in Myanmar, will not be a smooth one.

== Background ==
The beginning of the ethnic armed conflict in Myanmar can be traced back to just before its independence from Britain in 1948, and has been labelled one of the most challenging issues the country has faced since then. The conflict escalated when military rule began in Burma (now Myanmar) in 1958 under Prime Minister Ne Win.

Since independence, there have been issues relating to the differing ethnicities and groups residing in Myanmar, and their fight for equal treatment, stability, and social, political and cultural rights. They have faced issues such as forced relocation, underdevelopment in areas in which they reside, and high levels of poverty. The conflict has caused high levels of internal displacement, casualties, and social and economic issues. Alongside this, there have been issues surrounding Government accountability and the need for democracy. Despite many of these issues affecting all Burmese citizens, according to Burma Link, the ethnic minorities of Myanmar have been impacted the most.

== Key events in the political timeline since 1947 ==
See also for earlier timeline: Post-independence Burma, 1948-62

=== 1947 - First Constitution ===
The First Panglong Peace Conference took place, to discuss the status of citizens post independence, and Myanmar enacted its first Constitution as an independent country. Under its Constitution, a bicameral legislature was created, with power residing with the Prime Minister and Cabinet. Along with this, the Shan, Kachin, Kayin, Kayah and Chin states were created in the non-Burmese areas of Myanmar.

=== 1948 - Independence from Britain ===
Burma gained independence from Britain on 4 January 1948 and came under the prime ministerial power of foreign minister U Nu. Ten years later, in 1958, the military took power under politician Ne Win.

=== 1962 - Military coup and creation of socialist state ===
In March 1962 a military coup was led by Burmese politician Ne Win, and the Burma Socialist Programme Party was established in an attempt to create a socialist state, removing the representative democracy that had been present since 1948. During this time the federal system was abolished and the rise of a one-party military system occurred. Internal conflicts and tensions rose between the citizens and the military as the ethnic minorities were unwilling to accept the demands of dictator Ne Win.

=== 1974 - New Constitution ===
Myanmars second Constitution was established by the military after the coup in 1962. Under the new Constitution, a number of changes were made including the nationalisation of Burma's major enterprises, the shift to a socialist democracy with more power given to the military, and the adoption of a single party system, which recognised the Myanmar Socialist party as the only legitimate party.

=== 1988-1990 - Burma to Myanmar ===
In 1988, General Ne Win resigned as Prime Minister and was replaced by the State Law and Order Restoration Council (SLORC). In the following year, Burma was renamed Myanmar by the military government, and the name of the capital was changed from Rangoon to Yangon. In 1990, the National League for Democracy led by Aung San Suu Kyi won the election. However, the outcome of the election was ignored by the military government which placed Aung San Suu Kyi under house arrest.

=== 1993 - Attempted peace negotiations ===
Under the State Peace and Development Council, meetings were arranged between ethnic armed groups, the military and the Government to negotiate peace. Although certain agreements were achieved, such as that between the Kachin Independence Organisation which ended a 30-year war, many of them later unravelled. During this year, the Government started a national constitutional convention to debate constitutional changes, which would continue for a further 14 years.

=== 2003 - 2004 Khin Nyunt and end to Karen National Union conflict ===
In 2003, Khin Nyunt became Prime Minister and, in an effort to lead Myanmar to a democracy, proposed a new constitution. Within a short time, he was removed from power. The following year, the Burmese Government and one of the largest armed ethnic groups in Myanmar, the Karen National Union, agreed to end the conflict between them.

=== 2007 - UN Security Council draft resolution ===
In an attempt to prevent further persecution of citizens by the Burmese Government, a draft US resolution was proposed at the UN Security Council, although it was vetoed by Russia and China. The Government was also accused by the Red Cross of breaching the rights of its people. Following 14 years of the national convention, the military put an end to the constitutional discussion that had commenced in 1993.

=== 2008 - New constitution proposal ===
A new constitution was proposed by the Myanmar Government, which gave special privileges to the military. This included the ability to displace the president in an emergency and prevent the leader of the National League of Democracy, Aung San Suu Kyi, from gaining power. This constitution was voted in, following a referendum in mid-2008.

=== 2011 - 2013 - U Thein Sein and peace process launch ===
After being elected in March 2011, President U Thein Sein attempted to connect with the citizens of Myanmar by allowing peaceful demonstrations, in an attempt to try and negotiate a lasting peace and, during this period, with support from the international community, the current peace process began. At the end of 2011, the military was ordered by the Government to stop fighting the Kachin rebels, and in early 2012, a ceasefire agreement was signed between the two parties. By early 2013, there were numerous bilateral ceasefire agreements signed by the main groups and the government, and in late 2013, the Nationwide Ceasefire Coordination Team was formed.

=== 2014 - Nationwide Ceasefire Agreement draft ===
Drafts of the Nationwide Ceasefire Agreement (NCA), an agreement promoting long term peace negotiations between the armed ethnic minorities and the Government, were combined into a single text. This text involved seven chapters outlining the implementation and monitoring of ceasefires, as well as a road map for the peace process that was expected to follow.

=== 2015 - Signing of the NCA ===
Ahead of the upcoming constitutional referendum, the Government withdrew the Rohingya Muslims from voting, excluding them as citizens. The NCA was agreed upon between the Government and 16 of the armed ethnic groups, although in October only eight groups, the Government and the Tatmadaw signed the NCA.

=== 2016 - Union Peace Conference (21st Century Panglong Conference) ===
Htin Kyaw became President and after 50 years of military domination over the Government, a democracy movement began to take place. On 31 August, the first session of the Union Peace Conference, 21st Century Panglong, began and later in the year, the National League to Democracy was sworn into power with Aung Sang Suu Kyi as leader.

=== 2018 - Recent events ===
The UN initiated an investigation into the treatment of the Rohingya Muslims by the Myanmar military. The outcome of this investigation revealed the military had been carrying out war crimes and genocide against the Rohingya people. As a result, six generals are to be trialled at the International Criminal Court, and alongside this, leader Aung San Suu Kyi has been accused of failing to use her power to protect the citizens of Myanmar. In July 2018, the third session of the Union Peace Conference was held, and those ethnic minorities who are not already signatory to the NCA were encouraged to sign.

=== 2025 - Peace Forum ===
From 25 June to 27 June 2025, the State Administration Council junta's National Unity and Peacemaking Coordination Committee held a Peace Forum in Naypyidaw with the remaining signatories of the Nationwide Ceasefire Agreement (except for the Restoration Council of Shan State), the United Wa State Army, the Shan State Progress Party, and the National Democratic Alliance Army. Among the topics discussed were: the end of conscription during election periods, a constitutional review conference, the release of political dissidents, and claims for fair elections.

However, the Peace Forum received criticism from anti-junta groups for attempting to legitimize military rule for international audiences and repeating the same mistakes of the 21st century Panglong Peace Conference.

=== 2026 - 31 July Offers ===
During a Union Government of Myanmar cabinet meeting on 20 April 2026, Min Aung Hlaing offered EAOs and PDF groups peace talks before 31 July. The National Unity Government was not mentioned in the meeting. Both the Karen National Union and the Chin National Front rejected the offers.

== Past attempts at, and steps towards, peace ==
There have been numerous attempts made by the Myanmar Government to promote long lasting peace and democracy, and end the ongoing conflict between the armed ethnic minorities and the military. Since 2011, discussions have been taking place amongst the armed ethnic groups, military and government, although there are still gender, federal and ethnic rights issues that need to be resolved.

The First Panglong Peace Conference took place in early 1947, and was a meeting between the leader of Myanmar, General Aung San and the leaders of a number of the ethnic divisions including Kachin, Shan and Chin to discuss the status of upcoming independent Myanmar. The Agreement created at the conference proposed a promise that the Burmese government was to fulfil, which would provide the ethnic minorities with autonomy and established the Union of Burma.

The Second Panglong Peace Conference followed this on 6 February, and was attended by the government and delegates from the Shan and Kachin states. Outcomes from this conference included the agreement of internal autonomy for these states, as well as the union of Burma. The Panglong Agreement that was created by these two conferences was signed on 12 February 1947 by all those in attendance.

Other minor agreements that attempted peace between ethnic minorities and the government include the 1989 United Wa State Army agreement, the 1994 Kachin Independence Organisation Agreement, and the 1995 New Mon State Party agreement.

In August 2011, President U Thein Sein began the Call for Peace, in which he invited the armed ethnic minorities of Myanmar to begin peace talks with the government. During this time, the government also began to formalise agreements that had previously only been verbal. Following this, in November 2013, the Nationwide Ceasefire Coordination Team was formed to represent the armed ethnic minorities in discussions with the government and first represented them at a summit in Laiza at the Kachin Independence Organisation headquarters.

A significant step towards achieving peace between the different parties of the conflict is the Nationwide Ceasefire Agreement (NCA), that was drafted in 2014. After being agreed upon by 16 different ethnic armed groups, the agreement was drawn up and signed at a ceremony in 2015. Despite the initial support, only 8 of the ethnic groups ended up signing the agreement, with the others either choosing not to sign, or being disqualified by the government. However, the 2021 Myanmar coup d'état is widely regarded as signaling the failure of the Myanmar peace process, as the country slipped back into widespread civil war.

== Current attempts at peace process ==
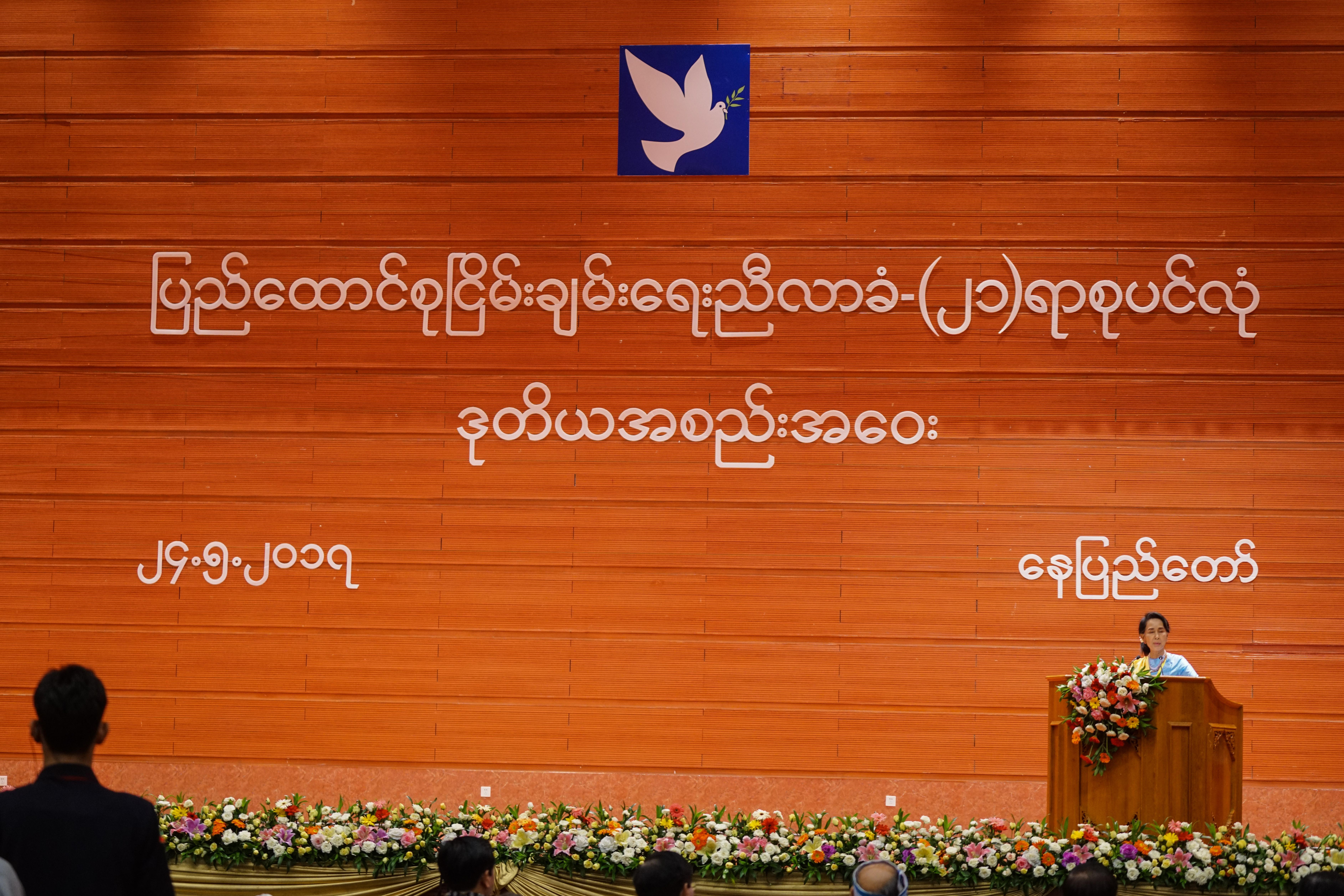
Leader of the National League for Democracy in Myanmar, Aung Sang Suu Kyi, at the 21st Century Panglong Conference.

There is a constant ongoing focus on peace in Myanmar, with the most recent peace process directed at ending the conflict between the 21 ethnic armed minorities and the Myanmar Government, with an overarching aim of creating a democratic, federal state.

The first session of the Union Peace Conference or the 21st Century Panglong Conference first took place on August 31, 2016 in Naypyidaw, Myanmar. The first two sessions of this conference had little impact on resolving the differences and ongoing conflict. According to Lin Let Kyae Sin, this may be due to the fact that peace talks are taking place while the 2008 constitution is still in place, one that solidifies the military power over Burmese citizens.

The most recent session of this conference took place in July 2018 and involved encouraging those armed ethnic groups who were not already signatories of the NCA, to become a part of the peace process. This conference mainly addressed the ways in which a federal democratic system could be established in Myanmar, and had a focus on equality, the involvement of citizens in the peace making process, and the best ways to achieve agreements on the peace process. Although peace was a key aim of these discussions, attention was directed away from this due to concerns surrounding the current armed ethnic conflict, particularly in the Shan and Kachin states.

There are attempts to understand why western-initiated attempts at brokering peace have failed so many times. New attempts are being made to understand how authority and power are understood in Myanmar that are different that what is assumed by peace negotiators. An example is a paper by Tony Waters and Somboon Panyakom describing how the ideas of Thai philosopher Prawase Wasi might be applied to the situation in Myanmar.

General Gun Maw of the Kachin Independence Army revealed on 11 August 2025 that the State Security and Peace Commission attempted to hold online peace talks. The Kachin Independence Organization offered to send a delegation to Myitkyina, but was met with no response. Instead, the junta tried to reach out online again.

The defence minister of the National Unity Government, U Yee Mon, stated in an interview with Public Voice Television Myanmar that the PDF and other groups are open to political dialogue if the Tatmadaw is willing to implement systemic reforms.
