= Myanmar–Russia relations =

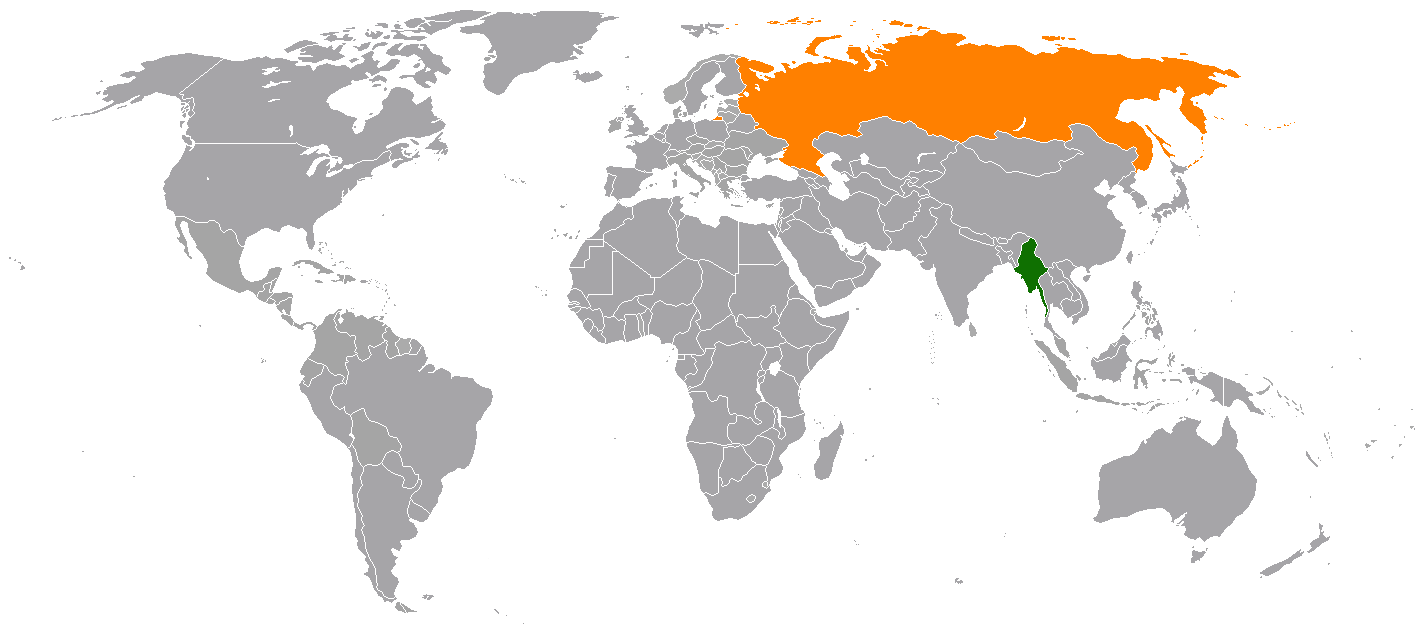
- Russia: Myanmar

Diplomatic mission
- Embassy of Russia, Yangon: Embassy of Myanmar, Moscow

Myanmar–Russia relations are the bilateral relations between Myanmar and Russia. Myanmar has an embassy in Moscow whilst Russia has an embassy in Yangon.

== History ==
Burma–Soviet Union relations
- Burma: Soviet Union

The USSR established diplomatic relations with Myanmar upon the latter's independence in 1948, which remain to the present day through Russia. In 2007, alongside China, Russia vetoed a U.N. Security Council resolution condemning alleged human rights abuses and atrocities at the hands of the Myanmar government.

=== 2022 ===
In August 2022, Russian Foreign Minister Sergey Lavrov described Myanmar as a "friendly and longstanding partner."

On 7 September 2022, Myanmar's junta chief Min Aung Hlaing met with Russian President Vladimir Putin on the sidelines of an economic meeting in eastern Russia, the first time that the pair have met since the 2021 Myanmar coup d'état.

In July of that year, evidence was discovered that Myanmar has supplied 120 mm mortar rounds to Russia for the ongoing Russo-Ukrainian war.

=== 2023 ===
On 11 August 2023, Myanmar Airways became set to launch direct flights to the Russian city of Novosibirsk.

On 7 November 2023, Myanmar and Russia held their first ever joint naval exercise, which was carried out in the Andaman Sea.

=== 2025 ===
On 23 February 2025, Russia and Myanmar signed a memorandum on investment in the Dawei special economic zone, including plans for a port, coal-fired power plant, and oil refinery. Russian Minister Maxim Reshetnikov and Myanmar's Kan Zaw signed the deal during a Russian delegation's visit. Reshetnikov noted oil refining remained the most complex element, with its feasibility still under review. Russia and Myanmar also discussed energy projects, including a gas pipeline to Yangon and a potential nuclear research reactor.

On 3 March 2025, Myanmar's military leader, Senior General Min Aung Hlaing, arrived in Russia for talks with President Vladimir Putin, accompanied by officials from the ruling military council. Russia is a key ally, providing military support, including fighter jets used against ethnic minority groups allied with pro-democracy forces. Moscow also shields Myanmar's government in global forums. The two nations have held joint military drills, signed a nuclear power pact, and are expanding economic cooperation, including their labor agreements.

=== 2026 ===
On 3 February 2026, the Myanmar military government and Russia signed a military cooperation pact planned to last until 2030.

From 6 to 17 July, the Russian Armed Forces and the Tatmadaw conducted joint special forces training in Naypyidaw under "Operation Tropical Storm."

== Agreements ==
In June 2016, the two countries signed a defence cooperation agreement. Min Aung Hlaing and Sergei Shoigu announced their intention to expand military cooperation in a 2018 meeting.

== Nuclear cooperation ==
In 2007, according to a press release, "The centre will comprise a 10MW light-water reactor working on 20%-enriched uranium-235, an activation analysis laboratory, a medical isotope production laboratory, silicon doping system, nuclear waste treatment and burial facilities".

== See also ==
- Foreign relations of Myanmar
- Foreign relations of Russia
