= Dwe Bu =

Burmese politician

Sithu, Daw Dwe Bu
- ဒွဲဘူ
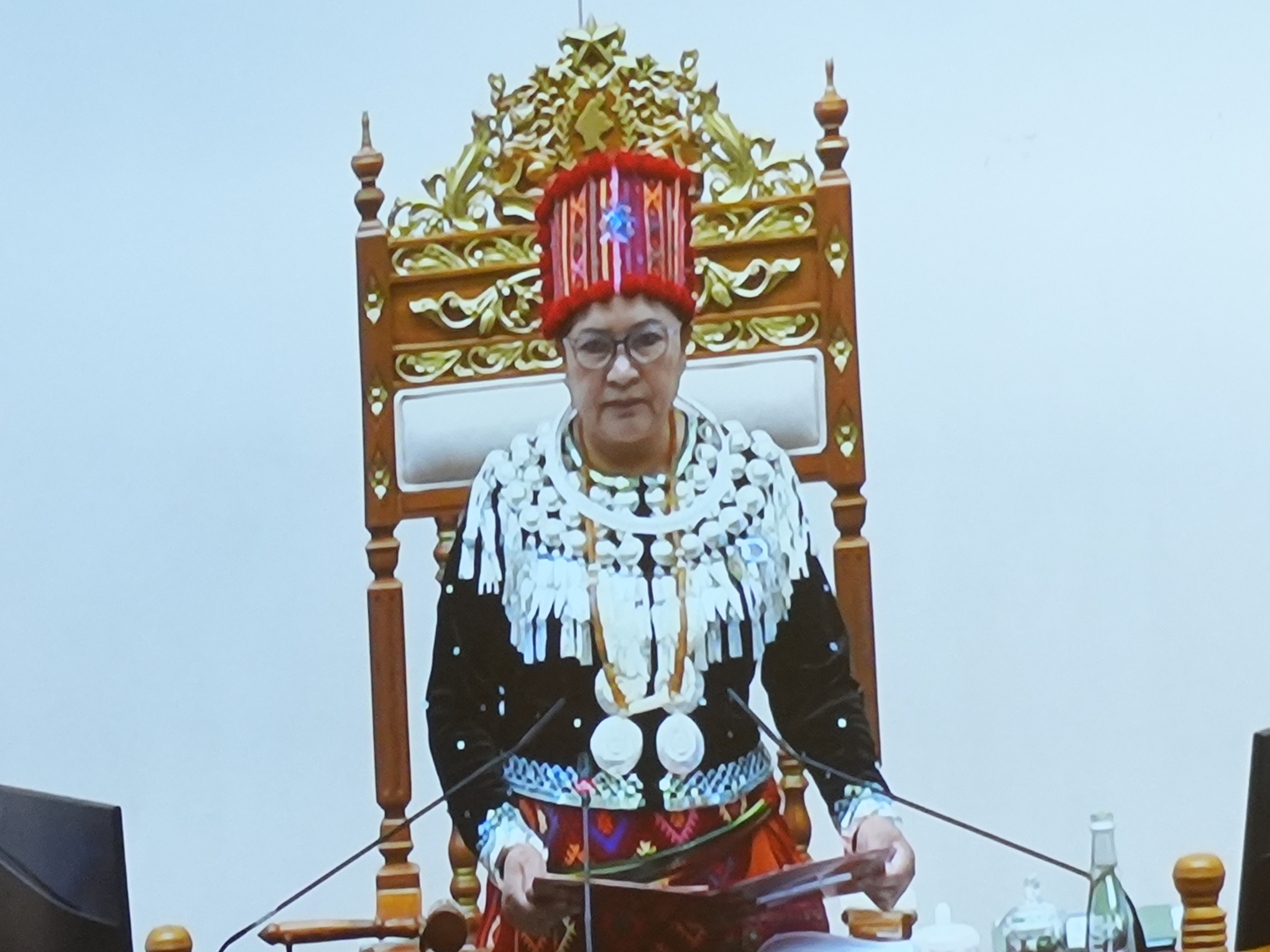
- Daw Dwe Bu during the third term of the Amyotha Hluttaw in 2026.

Member of the Amyotha Hluttaw
- Incumbent
- Assumed office 18 March 2026
- Constituency: Kachin State, No. (5)

Member of the Central Advisory Body of the National Defence and Security Council
- Incumbent
- Assumed office 31 July 2025
- Appointed by: National Defence and Security Council
- Leader: Saw Tun Aung Myint (Group Leader)
- Preceded by: Office established

Member of the State Administration Council
- In office 1 February 2023 – 31 July 2025
- Appointed by: State Administration Council
- Preceded by: Council reorganization
- Succeeded by: Council dissolution

Vice Chairperson (1) of the Kachin State People's Party
- In office 4 May 2020 – 14 July 2022

Member of the Pyithu Hluttaw
- In office 30 March 2011 – 1 February 2021
- Constituency: Injangyang Township

Personal details
- Born: March 26, 1962 (age 64) Myitkyina, Kachin State
- Citizenship: Myanmar
- Party: Union Solidarity and Development Party (2025–present)
- Other political affiliations: Kachin State People's Party (2019–2022); Unity and Democracy Party of Kachin State (UDP-KS) (2010–2019)
- Education: LL.B (University of Yangon)
- Occupation: Politician; Lawyer
- Awards: Sithu (2025)

Dwe Bu (Burmese: ဒွဲဘူ; born 26 March 1962), also spelt as Doi Bu, is a Burmese politician and lawyer of Kachin descent. She is a member of the Amyotha Hluttaw for Kachin State No. (5). She previously served as a member of the State Administration Council (SAC) from 2023 to 2025.

== Early life and education ==
Dwe Bu was born in Myitkyina, Kachin State. She attended Basic Education High School No. (3) Myitkyina and later studied law at the University of Yangon in 1982. After obtaining her LL.B degree, she practiced as an apprentice lawyer and higher-grade pleader starting in 1988, eventually becoming an advocate.

== Political career ==
=== Electoral history ===
Dwe Bu entered politics during the 2010 Myanmar general election, representing the Unity and Democracy Party of Kachin State (UDP-KS). She was elected as a member of the Pyithu Hluttaw for Injangyang Township. She contested the 2015 and 2020 elections but did not secure a seat in either term.

=== Parliamentary and Council roles ===
During her first term in parliament, she served as the secretary of the Ethnic Affairs and Internal Peacebuilding Committee and was a member of the Union Peacemaking Working Committee (UPWC).

On 14 July 2022, prior to her appointment to the State Administration Council, she resigned from her position as Vice Chairperson of the Kachin State People's Party (KSPP) to maintain a neutral political stance while serving in the government body.

On 1 February 2023, she was appointed as a member of the State Administration Council. Following the council's dissolution in July 2025, she was appointed to the Central Advisory Body of the National Defence and Security Council (NDSC).

=== Chairperson of the Amyotha Hluttaw (2026) ===
In the 2025–26 Myanmar general election, she contested and won the Kachin State No. (5) seat for the Amyotha Hluttaw under the Union Solidarity and Development Party (USDP). On 18 March 2026, during the first regular session of the third Amyotha Hluttaw, she was selected as the chairperson. She presided over the election of the Speaker, Aung Lin Dwe, and the Deputy Speaker, Jeng Phang Naw Taung. She is the first woman in Myanmar's history to serve as the chairperson of the Amyotha Hluttaw.

== International sanctions ==
Due to her role in the State Administration Council following the 2021 military coup, she has been placed on the sanctions list by the Government of Canada.

== Honours ==
On 17 April 2025, the State Administration Council conferred upon her the title of Sithu, a member of the Order of the Union of Myanmar.
