= Speaker of the Amyotha Hluttaw =

Parliamentary office in Myanmar

Speaker of Amyotha Hluttaw
- အမျိုးသားလွှတ်တော်ဥက္ကဌ
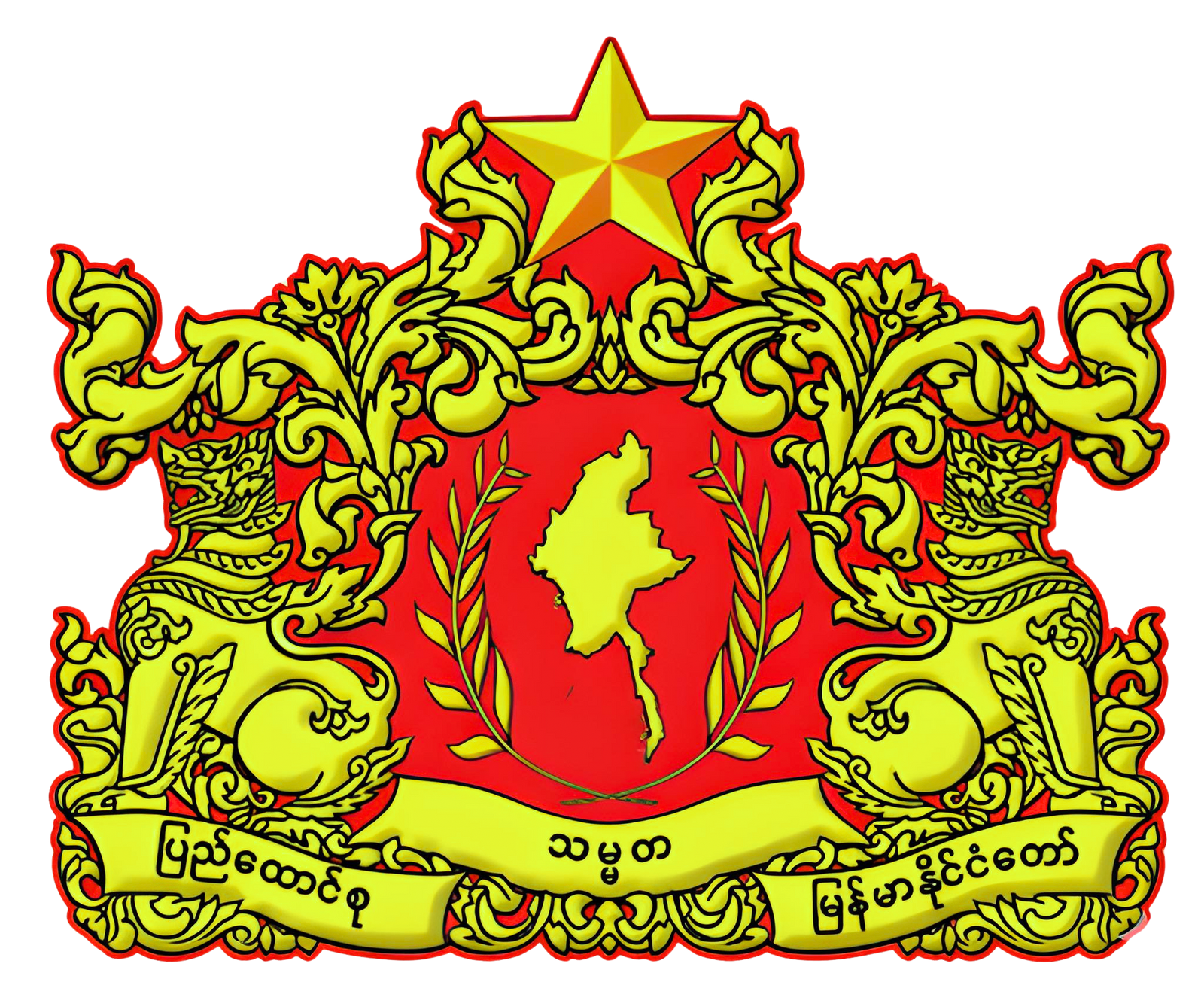
- State Seal of Burma

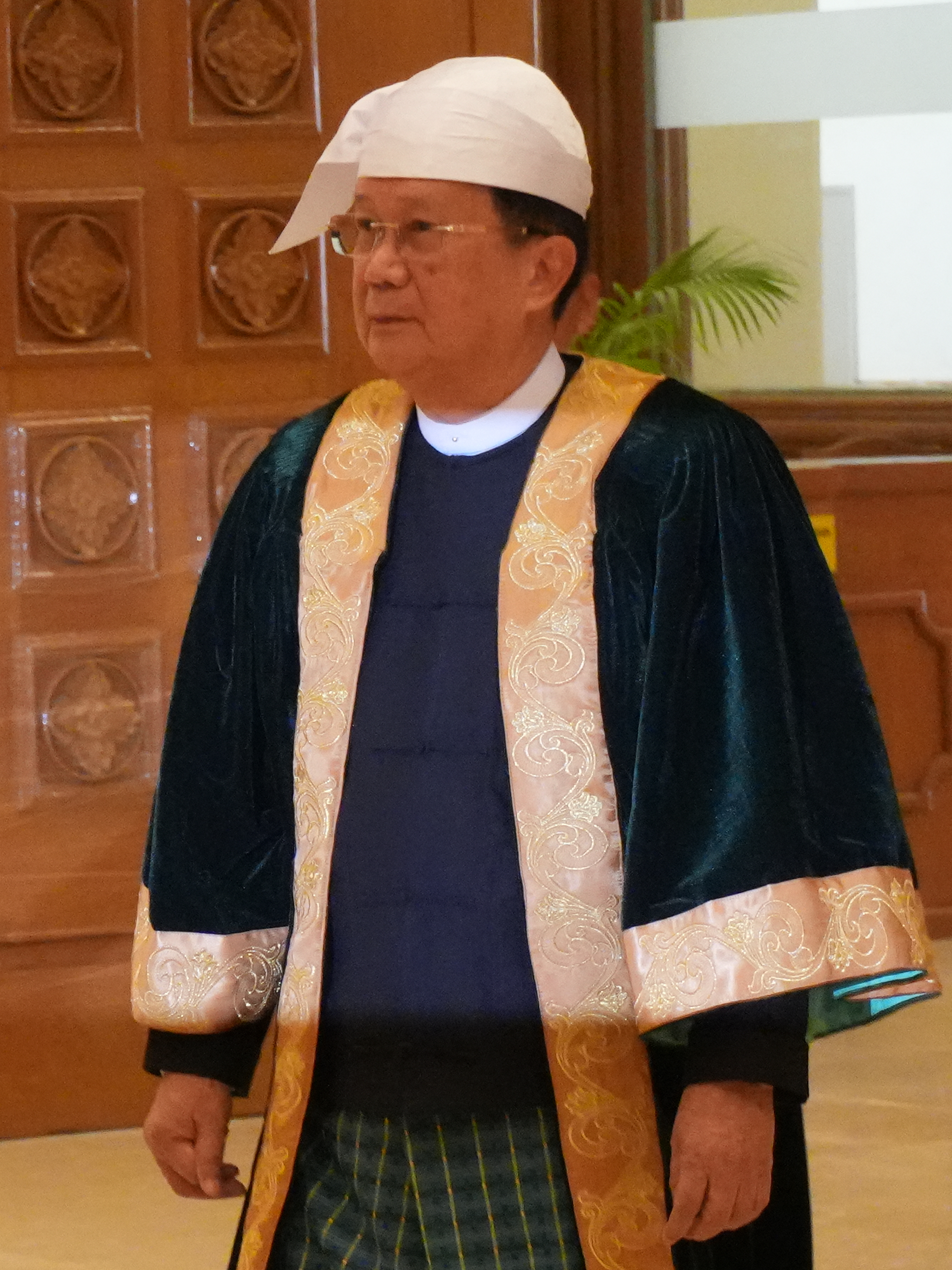
- Incumbent; Aung Lin Dwe since 18 March 2026
- Style: H.E.
- Member of: Amyotha Hluttaw
- Nominator: Amyotha Hluttaw
- Appointer: Amyotha Hluttaw
- Term length: 5 years
- Constituting instrument: Constitution of Burma
- Formation: 2011
- First holder: Khin Aung Myint
- Deputy: Deputy Speaker
- Salary: K3.5 million / month

The Speaker of the Amyotha Hluttaw (Burmese: အမျိုးသားလွှတ်တော်ဥက္ကဌ) is the presiding officer or Speaker of the Amyotha Hluttaw, one of the houses of the bicameral legislature of Myanmar.

== List of speakers of the Hluttaw ==
No.	Portrait	Name (Born-Died)	Term of office			Political party	Assembly	Chamber
No.	Portrait	Name (Born-Died)	Took office	Left office	Time in office	Political party	Assembly	Chamber
1		Khin Aung Myint (b. 1945)	31 January 2011	1 July 2013	2 years, 151 days	Union Solidarity and Development Party	1st	Amyotha Hluttaw
2		Shwe Mann (b. 1947)	1 July 2013	8 February 2016	2 years, 222 days	Union Solidarity and Development Party	1st	Pyithu Hluttaw
3		Mahn Win Khaing Than (b. 1951)	8 February 2016	1 August 2018	2 years, 174 days	National League for Democracy	2nd	Amyotha Hluttaw
4		T Khun Myat (b. 1949)	1 August 2018	20 March 2026	8 years, 38 days	Independent	2nd	Pyithu Hluttaw
5		Aung Lin Dwe (b. 1962)	20 March 2026	Incumbent	172 days	Union Solidarity and Development Party	3rd	Amyotha Hluttaw

== List of deputy speaker of the Amyotha Hluttaw ==
No.	Portrait	Name (Born-Died)	Term of office			Political party	Assembly
No.	Portrait	Name (Born-Died)	Took office	Left office	Time in office	Political party	Assembly
1		Mya Nyein	31 January 2011	29 January 2016	4 years, 363 days	Union Solidarity and Development Party	1st
2		Aye Thar Aung (b. 1945)	3 February 2016	31 January 2021	4 years, 363 days	Arakan National Party	2nd
3		Jeng Phang Naw Taung	18 March 2026	Incumbent	174 days	Union Solidarity and Development Party	3rd
