= Khin Aung Myint =

His Excellency Thiri Pyanchi Khin Aung Myint
- ခင်အောင်မြင့်
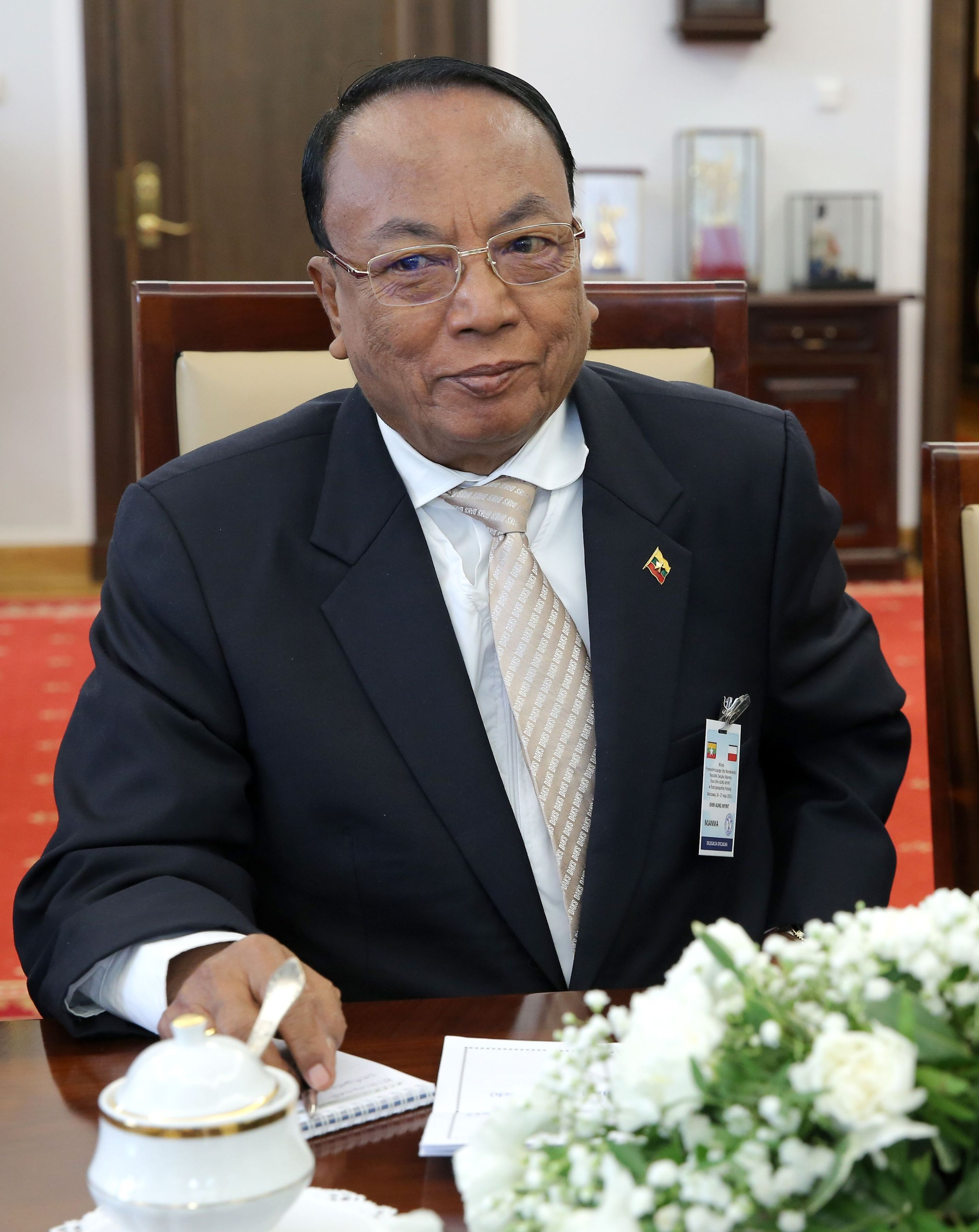
- Khin Aung Myint in 2015

Amyotha Hluttaw MP for Mandalay Region № 8 constituency
- In office 3 February 2016 – 1 February 2021

Speaker of the Assembly of the Union
- In office 31 January 2011 – 1 July 2013
- Deputy: Mya Nyein
- Preceded by: Position established
- Succeeded by: Shwe Mann

Speaker of the House of Nationalities
- In office 31 January 2011 – 29 January 2016
- Deputy: Mya Nyein
- Preceded by: Position established
- Succeeded by: Mahn Win Khaing Than

Amyotha Hluttaw MP for Mandalay Region № 9 constituency
- In office 31 January 2011 – 29 January 2016
- Preceded by: Position established
- Succeeded by: Maung Maung Swe

Minister of Culture
- In office 15 May 2006 – 30 March 2011
- Prime Minister: Soe Win; Thein Sein
- Preceded by: Kyi Aung
- Succeeded by: Kyaw Hsan

Personal details
- Born: 1945 (age 80–81)
- Party: Union Solidarity and Development Party (left the party in 2018)

Military service
- Allegiance: Myanmar
- Branch/service: Myanmar Army
- Rank: Major General

Khin Aung Myint (Burmese: ခင်အောင်မြင့်) is a Burmese politician and incumbent Amyotha Hluttaw MP for Mandalay Region № 8 constituency. He previously served as the first Speaker of the Assembly of the Union and Speaker of the Amyotha Hluttaw, the upper house of the Myanmar parliament. A senior official of the Myanmar military government and a major general, he was Director of Public Relations and Psychological Warfare in the Myanmar Ministry of Defense and was assigned as Minister of Culture after Kyi Aung in 2006.

== Early life and education ==
Khin Aung Myint graduated from Rangoon University (now University of Yangon) in 1968. He was then commissioned as an infantry officer after finishing 10th in class of the 40th intake of the Officers Training School Hmawbi in 1970, making him a senior officer to the currently serving officials of the State Administrative Council including Senior General Min Aung Hlaing.

His name is often confused with Khin Aung Myint's (Chief of Myanmar Air Force from 2013-2018) who is a graduate of the 20th intake of the Defence Services Academy.

== Career ==
Khin Aung Myint served as the Director of Public Relations and Psychological Warfare in the Myanmar Ministry of Defense from 1997 to 2006 before being appointed as the Minister of Culture. He then served as the first and foremost Speaker of the Assembly of the Union (2011-2013) Speaker of the Amyotha Hluttaw, the upper house of the Myanmar parliament (2011-2016) since the establishment of the 2008 Constitution of Myanmar, leading the first democratic Hluttaw procession of the country. In a March 2012 interview with The Irrawaddy, he called corruption the biggest issue facing the country.
