= Mahn Winn Khaing Thann =

Prime Minister of the National Unity Government

His Excellency Mahn Winn Khaing Thann
- မန်းဝင်းခိုင်သန်း
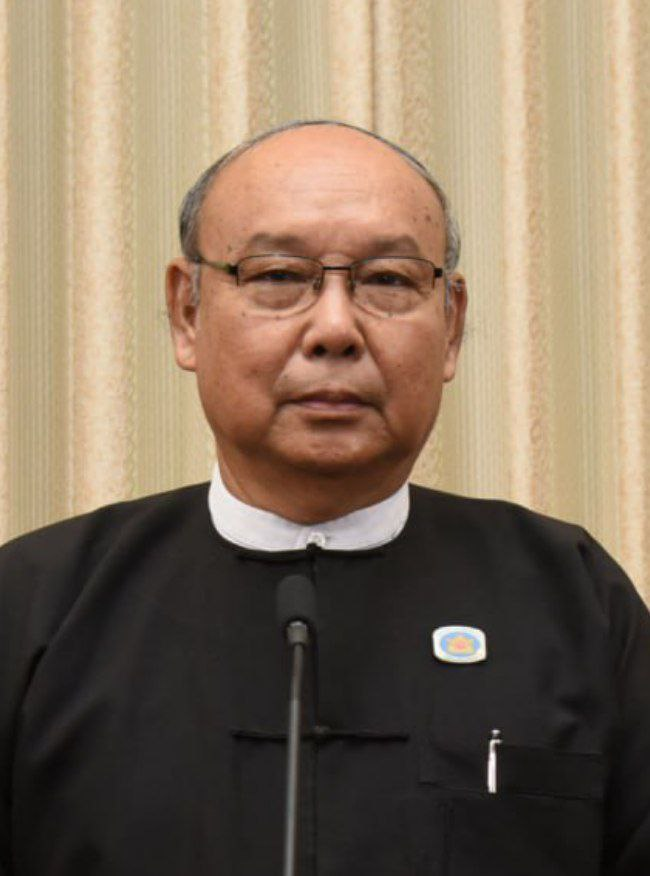
- Winn Khaing Thann in 2021

Prime Minister of the National Unity Government of Myanmar
- Incumbent
- Assumed office 16 April 2021
- President: Duwa Lashi La (acting)
- Preceded by: Office established

Acting President and Vice President in the Acting Cabinet of the Committee Representing Pyidaungsu Hluttaw
- In office 9 March 2021 – 16 April 2021
- Preceded by: Office established
- Succeeded by: Duwa Lashi La (NUG)

2nd Speaker of the House of Nationalities
- In office 3 February 2016 – 31 January 2021
- Deputy: Aye Thar Aung
- Preceded by: Khin Aung Myint
- Succeeded by: Aung Lin Dwe (2026)

3rd Speaker of the Assembly of the Union
- In office 8 February 2016 – 1 August 2018
- Deputy: Aye Thar Aung
- Preceded by: Shwe Mann
- Succeeded by: T Khun Myat

Amyotha Hluttaw MP
- In office 3 February 2016 – 1 February 2021
- Constituency: Kayin State No. 8 Myawaddy Township

Personal details
- Born: April 23, 1952 (age 74) Hinthada Township, Ayeyarwady Division, Burma (now Myanmar)
- Party: National League for Democracy
- Spouse: Nant Kyin Kyi
- Relations: Mahn Ba Khaing (Grandfather)
- Parent(s): Mahn Than Shein, Nant Khin Yee Khaing
- Education: Rangoon Arts and Science University
- Occupation: Politician, lawyer

Mahn Winn Khaing Thann (Burmese: မန်းဝင်းခိုင်သန်း [máɴ wɪ́ɴ kʰàɪɴ θáɴ]; also spelled Mahn Win Khaing Than, Mahn Win Khine Than or Mann Win Khaing Thann) is a Myanmar politician and lawyer who is serving as the Prime Minister of the National Unity Government of Myanmar, a government in exile. An ethnic Karen, he served as the Speaker of the Assembly of the Union from 2016 to 2018 and the Speaker of the House of Nationalities on behalf of Kayin State from 2016 until his removal from office in the 2021 Myanmar coup d'état.

== Early life ==
Mahn Winn Khaing Thann was born on 23 April 1952 in Hinthada Township, Ayeyarwady Division. He is an ethnic Karen, a Christian, and also the grandson of Mahn Ba Khaing. Mahn Ba Khaing served as Minister for Industry and Minister for Labor in the pre-independence cabinet of the AFPFL government; and was assassinated alongside Aung San, the father of Aung San Suu Kyi, on 19 July 1947 in the Secretariat, Yangon. Mahn Winn Khaing Thann graduated from the Rangoon Arts and Science University with a law degree in 1975.

== Career ==
He formerly served as the secretary of the Karen Literature and Culture Association, and joined the Union Karen League in 1990, which contested in the elections that same year. Then, he joined the National League for Democracy in 2013 and contested for the first time in the 2015 elections. In the 2015 election, he contested and won the Kayin State No. 8 constituency for a seat in the country's upper house.

Following the 2021 Myanmar coup d'état on 1 February, Mahn Winn Khaing Thann went into hiding with fellow senior National League for Democracy officials who also escaped arrest.

On 9 March 2021, Mahn Winn Khaing Thann was named Acting Vice-President of Myanmar by the Committee Representing Pyidaungsu Hluttaw, a government in exile composed of ousted National League for Democracy lawmakers who won seats in the 2020 elections.

On 16 April 2021, Mahn Winn Khaing Thann was appointed as the Prime Minister of the National Unity Government of Myanmar by the Committee Representing Pyidaungsu Hluttaw as part of the newly-formed National Unity Government.
