= Min Htin Aung Han =

Burmese politician

Member of the Mon State Hluttaw
- Incumbent
- Assumed office 3 February 2016
- Constituency: Mawlamyaing Township № 1

Minister of Electricity, Energy and Industry for Mon State
- In office ? April 2016 – 29 May 2018

Personal details
- Born: 28 January 1967 (age 59) Mawlamyaing, Mon State, Myanmar
- Party: National League for Democracy
- Education: B.E(Electrical Power)

Min Htin Aung Han (Burmese: မင်းထင်အောင်ဟန်) is a Burmese politician who currently serves as a Mon State Hluttaw member of parliament for Mawlamyaing Township № 1 Constituency.

Min served as a minister of Electricity, Energy and Industry for Mon State from April 2016 to 29 May 2018. He is a member of the National League for Democracy.

== Early life and education ==
Min Htin Aung Han was born on 28 January 1967 in Mawlamyaing, Mon State, Myanmar. He graduated B.E(Electrical Power).

== Political career ==
In the 2015 Myanmar general election, he was elected as a Mon State Hluttaw MP, from Mawlamyaing No.1 parliamentary constituency.
