= Naing Thiha =

Mon politician

- နိုင်သီဟ

Member of the House of Nationalities
- In office 3 February 2016 – 1 February 2021
- Constituency: Mon State № 7

Personal details
- Born: 23 September 1966 (age 59) Ye Township, Mon State
- Party: Mon National Party
- Spouse: Chan Mon
- Parent(s): Sein Maung (father); Daw Kyaing (mother)

Naing Thiha (Burmese: နိုင်သီဟ; born 23 September 1966) is a Mon politician who currently serves as a House of Nationalities member of parliament for Mon State No. 7 constituency. He is a member of the Mon National Party.

== Early life and education ==
Naing was born in Ye Township, Mon State to Sein Maung and Daw Kyaing of an ethnic Mon family. University studied first year and third year history major Mawlamyine was self-educated. From 1988 to 1997 had served 10 years in the New Mon State Party. The village had to participate as long as the development, To date, the village, Mon high school students working president of trustees.
