= Nanda Kyaw Swa =

Burmese politician

- နန္ဒကျော်စွာ

1st Deputy Speaker of the Burmese House of Representatives
- In office 31 January 2011 – 29 January 2016
- Preceded by: Position established
- Succeeded by: T Khun Myat

Member of the Burmese House of Representatives
- In office 31 January 2011 – 29 January 2016
- Preceded by: Constituency established
- Succeeded by: Thet Thet Khine
- Constituency: Dagon Township
- Majority: 6,608 (58.95%)

2nd Deputy Speaker of the Assembly of the Union
- In office 1 July 2013 – 29 January 2016
- Preceded by: Mya Nyein
- Succeeded by: Aye Thar Aung

Personal details
- Born: 1951 (age 74–75) Rangoon, Burma
- Party: USDP
- Spouse: Dr. Myint Htay
- Relations: Tin Pe
- Children: Saw Thu Nandi
- Parent: Brigadier-General Sithu Tin Pe

Nanda Kyaw Swa (Burmese: နန္ဒကျော်စွာ) was the Deputy Speaker of the Pyithu Hluttaw, the lower house of Burma's parliament, the Pyidaungsu Hluttaw. He was elected to the post from 31 January 2011 to 29 January 2016. He was also chair of the Rights Committee in the Lower House (2011–16). His father Tin Pe, is a retired Brigadier General.
