= Mon State Hluttaw =

Legislature of Mon State, Myanmar

Mon State Hluttaw မွန်ပြည်နယ်လွှတ်တော်
- 3rd Mon State Hluttaw

Type
- Type: Unicameral

History
- Founded: 8 February 2016

Leadership
- Speaker: Thet Htwe, USDP since 20 March 2026
- Deputy Speaker: Min Aung Myint, USDP since 20 March 2026

Structure
- Seats: 31; 23 elected MPs; 8 military appointees
- Political groups: USDP (11) MUP (7); NUP (1); NIDP (1); PPP (1); PP (1); PNDP (1) Tatmadaw (8)

Elections
- Last election: 2025-26 general election

Meeting place
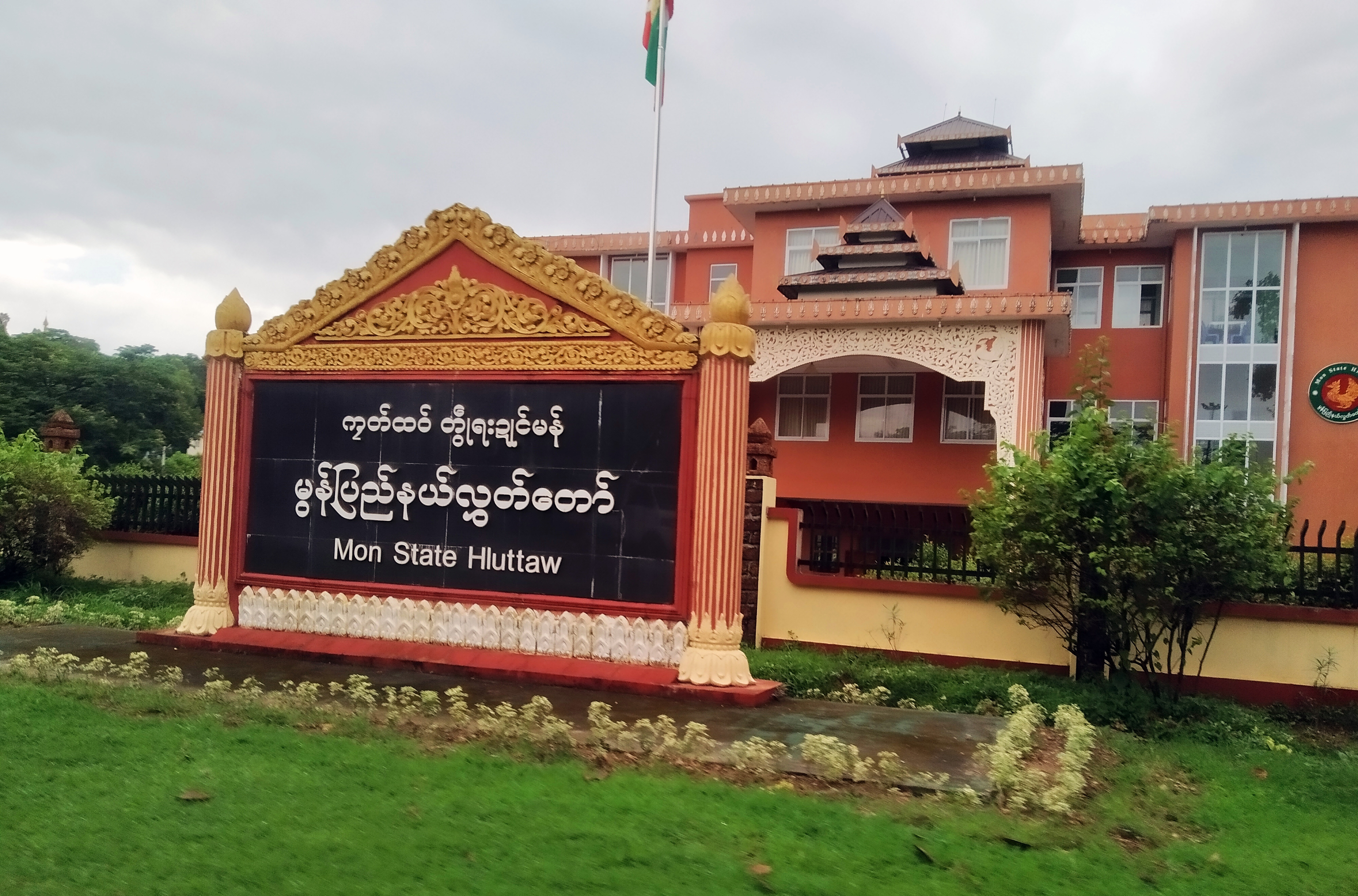
- State Hluttaw Meeting Hall; Mawlamyaing, Mon State

Website
- monstate.hluttaw.mm

Mon State Hluttaw (Burmese: မွန်ပြည်နယ်လွှတ်တော်; lit. 'Mon State Assembly') is the legislature of Mon State, Myanmar. It is a unicameral body, consisting of 31 members, including 23 elected members and 7 military representatives. As of March 2026, the Hluttaw was led by speaker Thet Htwe of the Union Solidarity and Development Party (USDP).

In 2025-26 general election, the USDP won 11 out of the total 23 contested seats in the legislature.

== Election results ==
=== 2015 ===
Seats of Mon State Hluttaw by Parties (result of November 2015 election)
Party	Seats	+/–	Seats %
National League for Democracy (NLD)	19	▲19	61.27
Mon National Party (MNP)	2	▲2	6.45
Union Solidarity and Development Party (USDP)	1	▼13	3.23
All Mon Region Democracy Party (AMDP; formerly AMRDP)	1	▼6	3.23
National Unity Party (NUP)	0	▼2	0
Military appointees	8		25.81
Total	31		100

=== 2025-2026 ===
Party	Seats				%	+/-
Party	FPTP	PR	EM	Σ	%	+/-
Union Solidarity and Development Party (USDP)	6	3	2	11	35.48%	▲11
Mon Unity Party (MUP)	4	3	0	7	22.58%	▲7
National Unity Party (NUP)	0	1	0	1	3.23%	▲1
National Interest and Development Party (NIDP)	0	1	0	1	3.23%	▲1
People's Pioneer Party (PPP)	0	1	0	1	3.23%	▲1
People's Party (PP)	0	1	0	1	3.23%	▲1
Pa-O National Development Party (PNDP)	0	0	1	1	3.23%	▲1
Military appointees	-	-	-	8	25.81%	Steady
Total				31	100.02%	

== See also ==
- State and Region Hluttaws
- Pyidaungsu Hluttaw
- Amyotha Hluttaw
- Pyithu Hluttaw
