= Thet Lwin =

Politician (1940–2023)

His Excellency Nai Thet Lwin
- နိုင်သက်လွင်
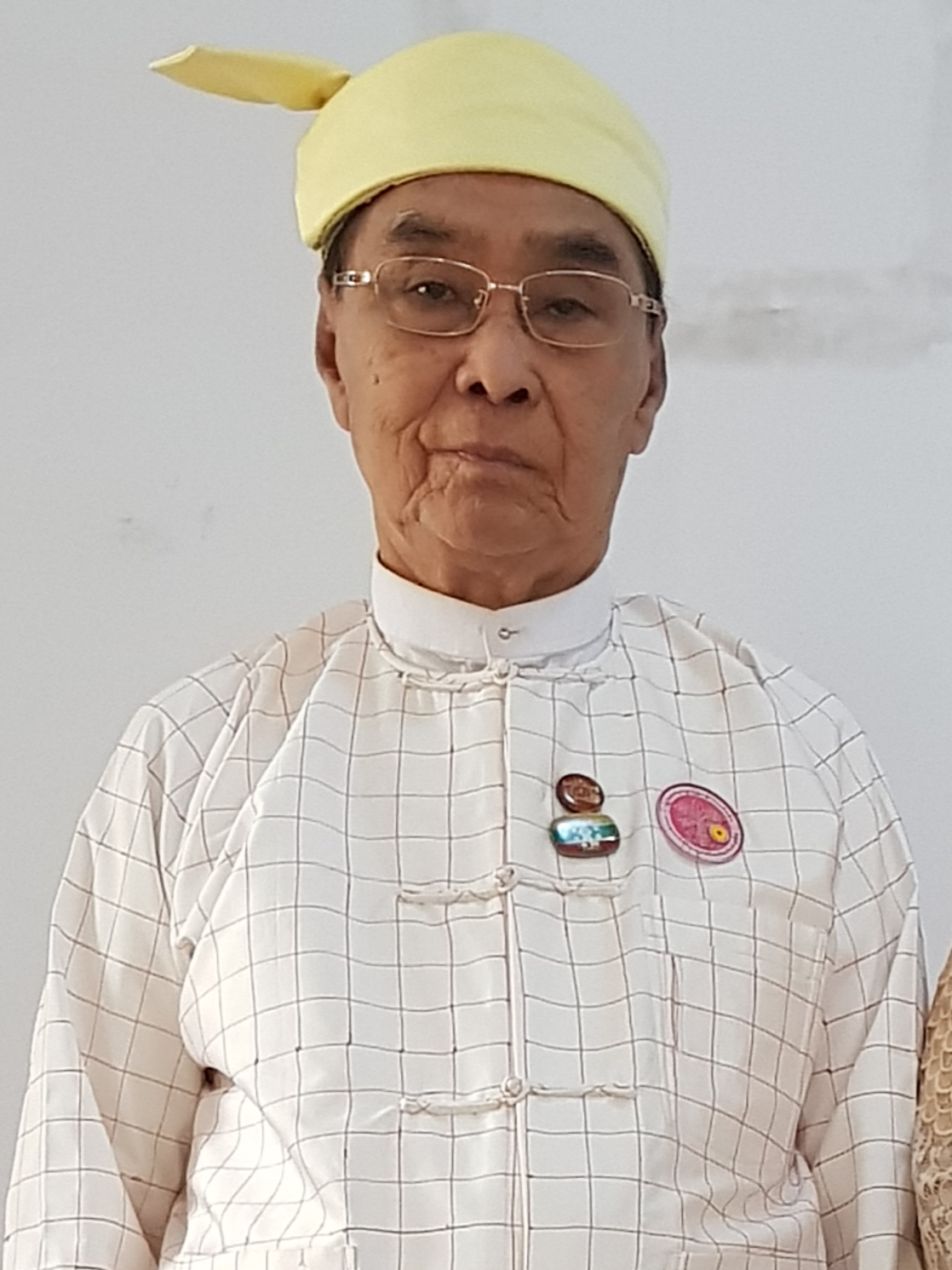

Minister of Ethnic Affairs
- In office 30 March 2016 – 1 February 2021
- President: Htin Kyaw (2016–2018); Win Myint (2018–2021)
- Preceded by: new post
- Succeeded by: Saw Tun Aung Myint

Mon National Party Vice Chairman

Personal details
- Born: 20 October 1940 Kawkareik, Kayin State, British Burma
- Died: 20 September 2023 (aged 82) Yangon, Myanmar
- Citizenship: Myanmar
- Party: Mon National Party
- Children: Mikon Chan, Min Byan San
- Education: BA (Philosophy)
- Alma mater: Mawlamyine University
- Occupation: Merchant, politician

Nai Thet Lwin (Burmese: နိုင်သက်လွင်; Mon: နာဲသိုက်လောန်; also Htet Lwin; 20 October 1940 – 20 September 2023) was an ethnic Mon Myanmar politician who was the Minister of Ethnic Affairs in the government of President Htin Kyaw.

== Background ==
Thet Lwin was born to Aung Nyein and Khin Thein in Kawkareik Township, Kayin State, on 20 October 1940. He went to Moulmein College (now Mawlamyine University) and studied philosophy. He started in politics at the age of 18, joining the Mon Development Party. After graduating in 1970, he focused on teaching and preserving Mon literature and culture.

== Political career ==
In 1988, he brought Mon politicians together in his house to form the Mon National Democratic Front, as part of the "8888" pro-democracy movement. He became vice-chairman of the MNDF, running for a seat in the Mon State capital, Mawlamyine, in the 1990 election.

After the 1990 election, the party was banned and he went into business, including rubber, fisheries processing, food exports and hotels. In 2011 he participated in government peace talks with the Mon National Liberation Army.

Thet helped reestablish the party in 2012, after political parties were allowed again. In 2015 he participated in the founding of the United Nationalities Alliance, which brought together eight ethnic minority political parties in Myanmar. He called for the implementation of a federal system in Myanmar as a top priority and said a democratic system and the rule of law were "of great importance". He was appointed the Minister of Ethnic Affairs, a newly formed ministry, in 2015. Asked what his policies were, he said, simply, "I will follow [NLD Chairperson] Daw Aung San Suu's instructions ... the country's ethnic minorities all love and trust her."

Thet took office on 30 March 2015 as part of the first government of the country formed by the opposition National League for Democracy (NLD) following their victory in the 2015 general election. The vice-chair of the Mon National Party, he was one of only three ministers appointed to cabinet from a party other than the ruling NLD.

== Personal life and death ==
Thet was married to Kyin Than and had four children, Mahn Banya San, Mi Kon Chan, Mahn Lagun Ein, and Man Banya Aung Htun. His daughter, Mi Kon Chan, was elected an MP for the NLD for Paung Township in the 2015 election.

Thet Lwin died from a heart attack in Yangon on 20 September 2023, at the age of 83.
