= Byedaik =

The Byedaik (Burmese: ဗြဲတိုက်, lit. "Bachelor Chambers") served as the Privy Council in pre-colonial Burma, by handling the court's internal affairs and also served as an interlocutor between the king and other royal agencies, including the Hluttaw.

== Origins ==
The Restored Taungoo Dynasty established a state administration system comprising two major administrative bodies, the Hluttaw and the Byedaik, which remained unchanged until the demise of the Konbaung dynasty in 1885.

== Etymology ==
The word bye stems from Mon blai (ဗၠဲာ), meaning "bachelor."

== Composition ==
During the Konbaung dynasty, the Byedaik consisted of:

- Eight Atwinwun (အတွင်းဝန်, cf. 'Ministers of the Interior')- communicated business affairs of the Hluttaw to the king, administered internal transactions of general affairs relating to the royal court.
- Thandawzin (သံတော်ဆင့်, "Heralds") - performed secretarial duties and attended king's audiences to note king's orders and forward them to Hluttaw for inscription.
- Simihtunhmu (ဆီမီးထွန်းမှူး, lit. "Lamp Lighters") - kept a list of all persons sleeping in the palace
- Hteindeinyanhmu (ထိန်းသိမ်းရန်မှူး, "caretakers of royal appointments") - performed menial tasks such as maintaining the palace furniture, draperies and other appointments

== Responsibilities ==
The Byedaik maintained the inner affairs of the royal court, whereas the Hluttaw was responsible for state affairs, including fiscal, executive, and judicial responsibilities, and managed the kingdom's government. The Byedaik relayed and facilitated communication between the monarch and the Hluttaw, and filtered information that was relayed from the Hluttaw. This gave the Byedaik immense influence in the court, as they were able to censor communications and formulate edicts returned to the Hluttaw, and serve as confidential advisors to the monarch. The Byedaik also supervised military security in the palace's royal living quarters. The Byedaik's influence created constant tensions with the Hluttaw, especially during coup attempts.

== See also ==
- Konbaung Dynasty
- Hluttaw
