= Saw Tun Aung Myint =

Burmese politician and naval officer

Thiri Pyanchi, U Saw Tun Aung Myint

Leader of the Central Advisory Group of the National Defence and Security Council
- Incumbent
- Assumed office 31 July 2025
- Appointed by: National Defence and Security Council
- Preceded by: Position established

Leader of the Central Advisory Group of the State Administration Council
- In office 1 February 2023 – 31 July 2025
- Appointed by: State Administration Council

Minister for Ethnic Affairs
- In office 3 February 2021 – 1 February 2023
- Leader: Min Aung Hlaing
- Preceded by: Nai Thet Lwin
- Succeeded by: Jeng Phang Naw Htaung

Minister for Kayin Ethnic Affairs (Yangon Region)
- In office 30 March 2011 – 31 March 2016
- Preceded by: Position established
- Succeeded by: Pan Thinzar Myo

Personal details
- Born: February 14, 1942 (age 84)
- Party: Kayin People's Party
- Education: Defence Services Academy (6th Intake)
- Occupation: Politician
- Military career
- Allegiance: Myanmar
- Branch: Myanmar Navy
- Service years: 1964–1993
- Rank: Lieutenant Colonel (Retd.)
- Awards: Thiri Pyanchi (2022)

Saw Tun Aung Myint(also known as Tun Aung Myint , Saw Htun Aung Myint; born 14 February 1942) is a Burmese politician and retired naval officer. He currently serves as the Leader of the Central Advisory Group of the National Defence and Security Council (NDSC). He was appointed to this position under Section 427, Sub-section (b) of the Constitution of the Republic of the Union of Myanmar.

== Early life and military career ==
Saw Tun Aung Myint graduated from the Defence Services Academy (DSA) as part of the 6th Intake. He served in the Myanmar Navy, where he received naval training in Denmark and the United States (1986). He attained the rank of Lieutenant Colonel and served as a Strategic Naval Fleet Commander before retiring in 1993. Following his military career, he held several senior positions in the Ministry of Transport, including Director General of the Department of Marine Administration.

== Political career ==
In 2010, Saw Tun Aung Myint founded the Kayin People's Party (KPP) and was elected as its chairman. In the lead-up to the 2010 Myanmar general election, he stated that the party decided to contest the elections to represent ethnic interests through a democratic process. He was elected as the Minister for Kayin Ethnic Affairs for the Yangon Region Government, a post he held until March 2016. In 2014, he proposed a "12-party talk" for constitutional reform in the Yangon Region Hluttaw, which was approved by a vote of 99 to 9.

=== Post-2021 roles ===
Following the 2021 Myanmar coup d'état, he was appointed Union Minister for Ethnic Affairs on 3 February 2021. On 1 February 2023, he transitioned to the role of Leader of the Central Advisory Group of the State Administration Council (SAC). On 31 July 2025, he was reassigned as the Leader of the 15-member Central Advisory Group of the National Defence and Security Council.

== International sanctions ==
On 17 May 2021, the United States Department of the Treasury added Saw Tun Aung Myint to its sanctions list due to his role in the SAC-led administration following the military coup.

== Personal life ==
He is the son of Saw Ba Maung, a lawyer and the final chairman of the Daw Kalu (Karen National Association), established in 1881. In 2022, he was awarded the title of Thiri Pyanchi by the State Administration Council for his service.
