= Speaker of the Pyidaungsu Hluttaw =

Speaker of Pyidaungsu Hluttaw
- ပြည်ထောင်စုလွှတ်တော် နာယက
- State Seal of Myanmar

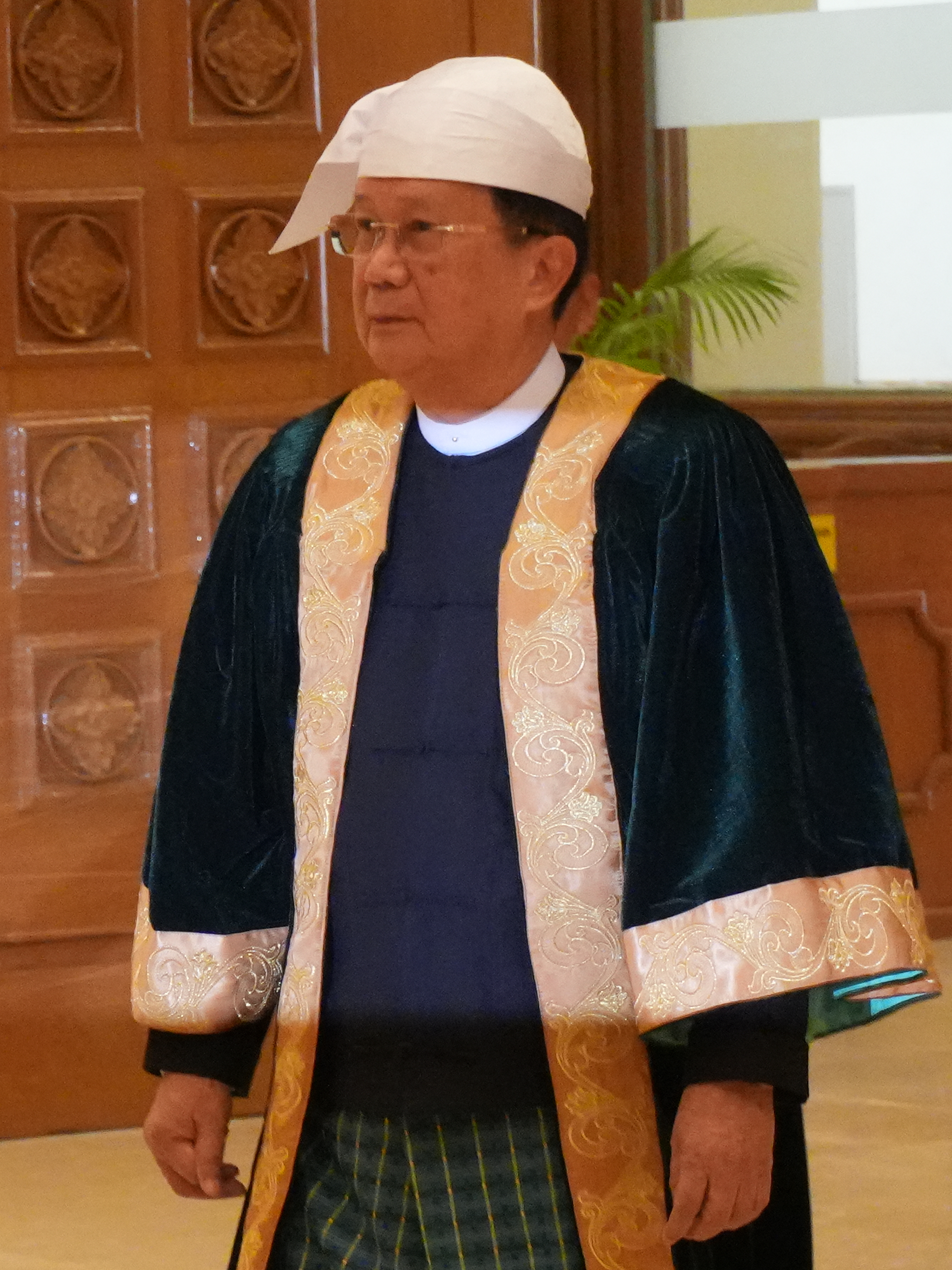
- Incumbent; Aung Lin Dwe since 20 March 2026
- Style: H.E.
- Member of: Pyidaungsu Hluttaw
- Nominator: Pyidaungsu Hluttaw
- Appointer: Pyidaungsu Hluttaw
- Term length: 30 months
- Constituting instrument: Constitution of Myanmar
- Formation: 2011
- First holder: Khin Aung Myint
- Deputy: Deputy Speaker

The Speaker of the Pyidaungsu Hluttaw (Burmese: ပြည်ထောင်စုလွှတ်တော် နာယက) is the presiding officer of the Pyidaungsu Hluttaw, the joint assembly of the bicameral legislature of Myanmar.

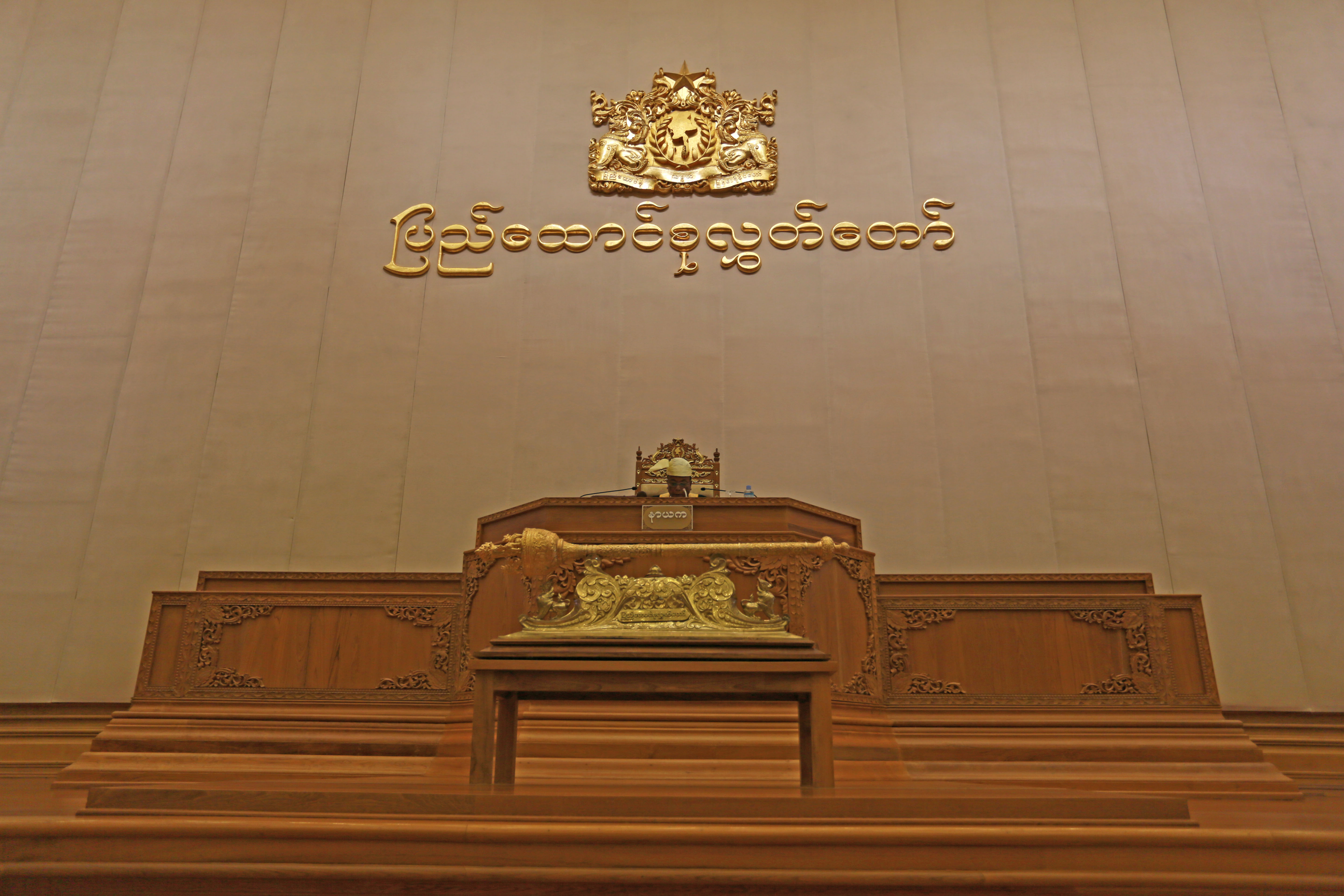
The Speaker Khin Aung Myint during the session of Hluttaw

== Election ==
After the completion of an election cycle, the Pyithu Hluttaw and Amyotha Hluttaw convene their first sessions, during which the speakers and deputy speakers of both Houses are elected from among the representatives of the respective assemblies.

Upon the election of the speakers and deputy speakers of the two Houses, under the Constitution of Myanmar, the speaker and deputy speaker of the Amyotha Hluttaw automatically fill in the role of the speaker and deputy speaker of the Union Assembly for a term of no more than 30 months, or half the parliamentary term, following which the speaker and deputy speaker of the Pyithu Hluttaw continue as speaker and deputy speaker of the Union Assembly for the remainder of the parliamentary term.

== List of speakers of the Pyidaungsu Hluttaw ==
No.	Portrait	Name (Born-Died)	Term of office			Political party	Assembly	Chamber
No.	Portrait	Name (Born-Died)	Took office	Left office	Time in office	Political party	Assembly	Chamber
1		Khin Aung Myint (b. 1945)	31 January 2011	1 July 2013	2 years, 151 days	Union Solidarity and Development Party	1st	Amyotha Hluttaw
2		Shwe Mann (b. 1947)	1 July 2013	8 February 2016	2 years, 222 days	Union Solidarity and Development Party	1st	Pyithu Hluttaw
3		Mahn Win Khaing Than (b. 1951)	8 February 2016	1 August 2018	2 years, 174 days	National League for Democracy	2nd	Amyotha Hluttaw
4		T Khun Myat (b. 1949)	1 August 2018	20 March 2026	8 years, 38 days	Independent	2nd	Pyithu Hluttaw
5		Aung Lin Dwe (b. 1962)	20 March 2026	Incumbent	172 days	Union Solidarity and Development Party	3rd	Amyotha Hluttaw
