= Jeng Phang Naw Taung =

Burmese politician and deputy parliament speaker

Thiri Pyanchi Jeng Phang Naw Taung
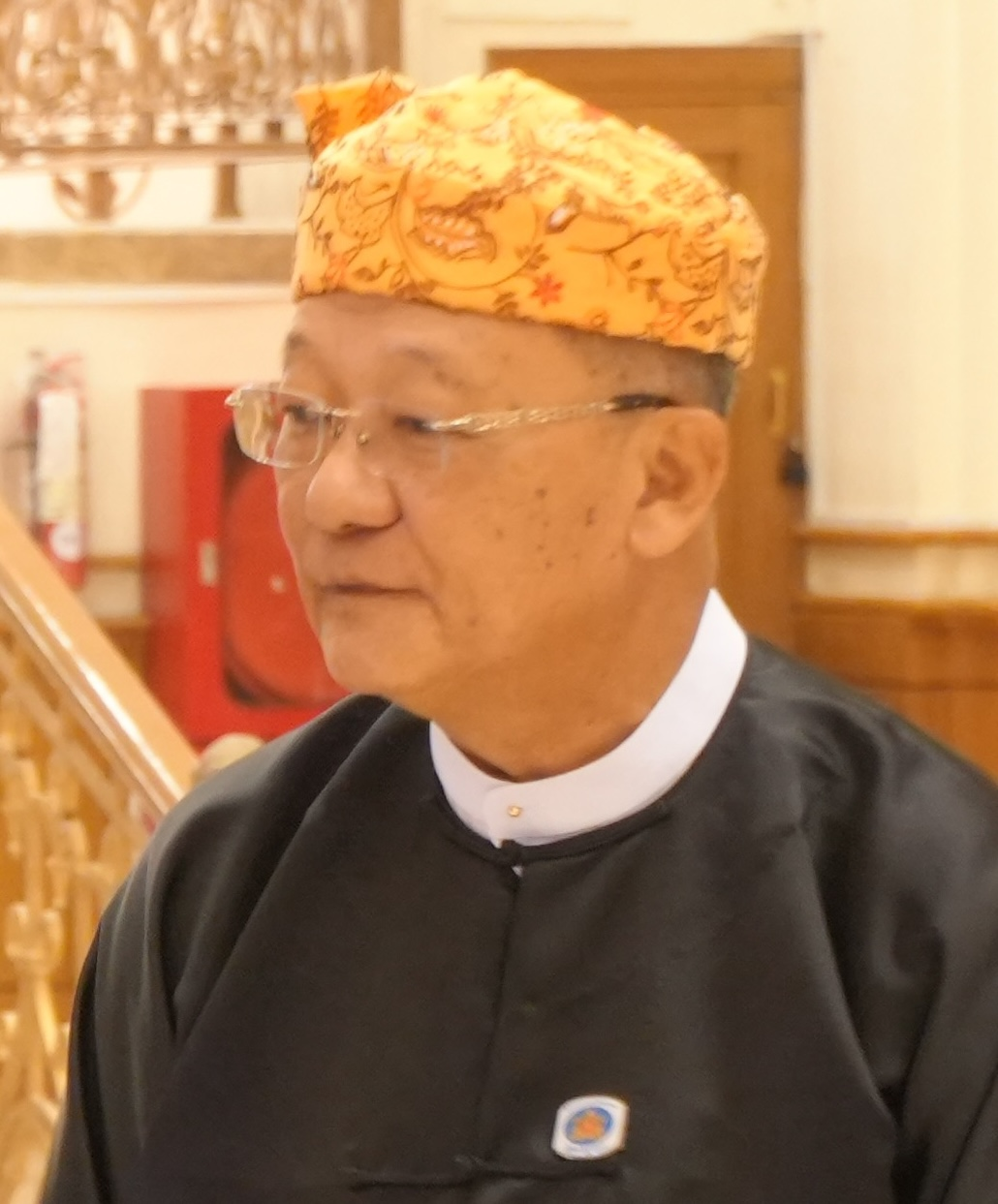

Deputy Speaker of the Amyotha Hluttaw
- Incumbent
- Assumed office 18 March 2026
- Leader: Aung Lin Dwe
- Preceded by: Aye Tha Aung

Member of the Amyotha Hluttaw
- Incumbent
- Assumed office 18 March 2026
- Constituency: Kachin State No. 2

Minister for Hotels and Tourism
- In office 31 July 2025 – 18 March 2026
- Preceded by: Thet Thet Khine

Minister for Sports and Youth Affairs
- In office 31 January 2025 – 18 March 2026
- Preceded by: Min Thein Zan

Minister for Ethnic Affairs
- In office 1 February 2023 – 31 January 2025
- Preceded by: Saw Tun Aung Myint
- Succeeded by: Khun Thant Zaw Htoo

Member of the State Administration Council
- In office 3 February 2021 – 31 January 2023

Personal details
- Party: USDP
- Occupation: Politician
- Military career
- Allegiance: Myanmar
- Branch: Myanmar Army
- Rank: Major (Retd.)
- Awards: Thiri Pyanchi (2026)
- Alma mater: Officer Training School (OTS-5)

Jeng Phang Naw Htaung (Burmese: Jeng Phang နော်တောင်) is a Burmese politician and retired military officer currently serving as the Deputy Speaker of the Amyotha Hluttaw (House of Nationalities) since March 2026. He previously held several ministerial portfolios and was a member of the State Administration Council (SAC).

== Military career ==
He served as an officer in the Myanmar Army, graduating as part of the 5th intake of the Officer Training School (OTS-5). He reached the rank of Major before retiring from military service.

== Political career ==
Following the 2021 Myanmar coup d'état, Jeng Phang Naw Htaung was appointed as a member of the State Administration Council on 3 February 2021, under Order No. 14/2021.

On 1 February 2023, he was appointed Union Minister for Ethnic Affairs. He was later reassigned as the Union Minister for Sports and Youth Affairs on 31 January 2025. From 31 July 2025, he concurrently served as the Union Minister for Hotels and Tourism.

In the 2025 general election, he contested as a candidate for the Union Solidarity and Development Party (USDP) for the Kachin State No. 2 constituency of the Amyotha Hluttaw. He was elected with 8,376 votes (82.56% of the total vote). On 18 March 2026, he was elected unopposed as the Deputy Speaker of the 3rd Amyotha Hluttaw.

== Honors ==
On 2 March 2026, the National Defence and Security Council awarded Jeng Phang Naw Htaung the title of Thiri Pyanchi in recognition of his service.
