= Injangyang Township =

Coordinates: 26°05′N 96°52′E

Injangyang Township အင်ဂျန်းယန်မြို့နယ်
- Township
- Location in Myitkyina district
- Country: Myanmar
- State: Kachin State
- District: Myitkyina District
- Time zone: UTC+6:30 (MMT)

Injangyang Township (also Njangyang Township; Burmese: အင်ဂျန်းယန်မြို့နယ်) is a township of Myitkyina District in the Kachin State of Burma (Myanmar). The principal town and administrative center is Injangyang. The 2002 population estimate for the township was 23,370.

== Borders ==
Injangyang Township is bordered by:

- Sumpranbum Township to the west and north,
- Hsawlaw Township to the east,
- Chibwe Township to the southeast,
- Waingmaw Township to the south, and
- Myitkyina Township to the southwest.
