= Mon Unity Party =

- Burmese name: မွန်ညီညွတ်ရေးပါတီ
- Mon name: ဗော်ညဳသၟဟ်မန်
- Chairman: Nai Lawi Ong
- General Secretary: Naing San Tin
- Founded: 11 July 2019 (registered)
- Merger of: AMRDP; MNP
- Headquarters: Mawlamyine, Mon State
- Ideology: Mon interests
- Seats in the Amyotha Hluttaw: 5 / 224
- Seats in the Pyithu Hluttaw: 5 / 440
- Seats in the Mon State Hluttaw: 7 / 23

Party flag

Website
- https://monunityparty.org/

The Mon Unity Party (MUP) is a political party in Myanmar (Burma). The party was formed from a merger of the All Mon Region Democracy Party and the Mon National Party. It has nearly 100,000 members and branch offices in Yangon, Kayin State, Tanintharyi, and Bago.

== History ==
In December 2018, leaders of the All Mon Region Democracy Party and Mon National Party, as well as other interested Mon politicians, submitted a petition to Myanmar's election commission to form a new party, the Mon Unity Party. The Mon Unity Party was officially registered on 11 July 2019. Its first chairman was Nai Tin Aung. During the 2020 Myanmar general election the party was led by Min Nwe Soe, former General Secretary of the All Mon Regions Democracy Party.

After the 2021 Myanmar coup d'état the Mon Unity Party was invited to participate in the military backed government and decided to cooperate with the regime. The party named Banyar Aung Moe as their representative on the State Administration Council. It was re-registered under the new electoral law, enacted by the military government in 2023.

The party took part in the 2025–26 Myanmar general election and won the second largest number of seats in Mon State.

== Party structure ==
The Mon Unity Party has 140 members on its central committee, including 59 members of the Central Executive Committee, four chairmen, and six secretariats.

== Election results ==
=== House of Nationalities (Amyotha Hluttaw) ===
Election	Leader	Total seats won	Total votes	Share of votes	+/–	Government
2020	Nai Lawi Ong	3 / 224	281,933	1.05%	▲2 (Note: Compared to results of its predecessors.)	Not recognised
2025-26	Nai Lawi Ong	5 / 224	153,344	1.21%	▲2	TBD

=== House of Representatives (Pyithu Hluttaw) ===
Election	Leader	Total seats won	Total votes	Share of votes	+/–	Government
2020	Nai Lawi Ong	2 / 440	264,839	0.99%	▲2	Not recognised
2025-26	Nai Lawi Ong	5 / 440	145,786	1.12%	▲3	TBD

=== Mon State Hluttaw ===
Election	Leader	Total seats won	Total votes	Share of votes	+/–	Government
2020	Nai Lawi Ong	6 / 23	N/A	N/A	▲3 (Note: Compared to results of its predecessors.)	Not recognised
2025-26	Nai Lawi Ong	7 / 23	N/A	N/A	▲1	TBD
