= Aung Lin Dwe =

Burmese politician and former army officer (born 1962)

His Excellency Sithu Zayya Kyawhtin Aung Lin Dwe
- အောင်လင်းဒွေး
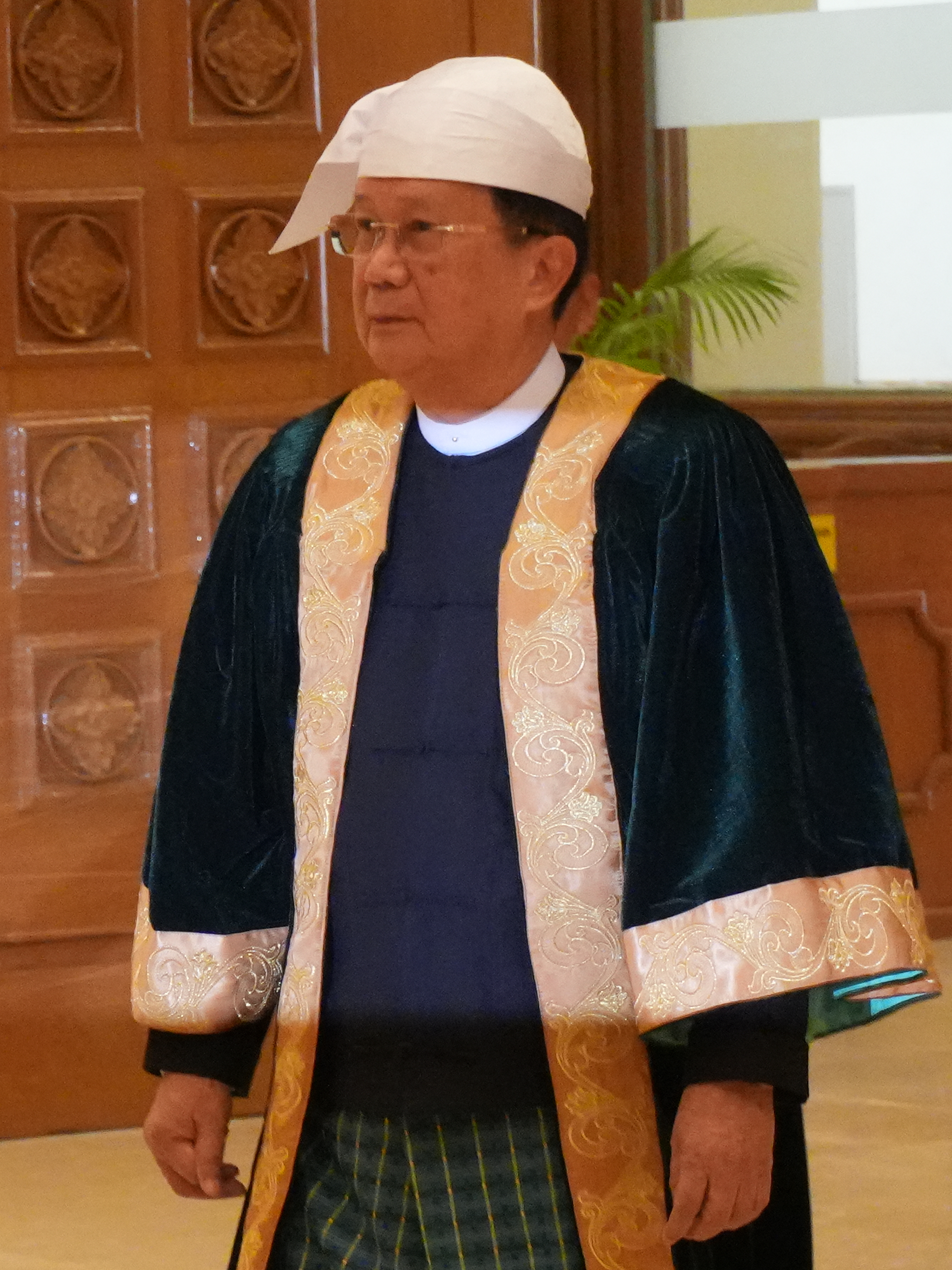
- Aung Lin Dwe in 2026

Speaker of the Pyidaungsu Hluttaw
- Incumbent
- Assumed office 20 March 2026
- Preceded by: T Khun Myat

3rd Speaker of the Amyotha Hluttaw
- Incumbent
- Assumed office 18 March 2026
- Deputy: Jeng Phang Naw Taung
- Preceded by: Mahn Win Khaing Than (2021)

Chief Executive of National Defence and Security Council
- In office 31 July 2025 – 10 April 2026
- Leader: Min Aung Hlaing
- Preceded by: Position Established
- Succeeded by: Position Abolished

Member of the State Security and Peace Commission
- In office 31 July 2025 – 10 April 2026
- Leader: Min Aung Hlaing
- Preceded by: Office Established
- Succeeded by: Office Abolished

Secretary of the State Administration Council
- In office 2 February 2021 – 31 July 2025
- Leader: Min Aung Hlaing
- Preceded by: Office Established
- Succeeded by: Office Abolished

Personal details
- Born: 31 May 1962 (age 64) Burma (now Myanmar)
- Party: Union Solidarity and Development
- Spouse: Ohn Mar Myint
- Children: Multiple, including: Hlaing Bwar Aung; Phyo Arkar Aung; Shwe Ye Phu Aung
- Education: Defense Services Academy

Military service
- Allegiance: Myanmar
- Branch/service: Myanmar Army
- Years of service: 1982–2025
- Rank: General

Aung Lin Dwe (Burmese: အောင်လင်းဒွေး; pronounced [ɔːŋ lɪn dwɛɪ]; born 31 May 1962) is a Burmese politician and former Myanmar Army officer who was the secretary of Myanmar's State Administration Council (SAC). He was appointed on 2 February 2021, in the aftermath of the 2021 Myanmar coup d'état. He was also the Judge Advocate General of the Tatmadaw and the secretary to the Peace Negotiation Committee.

== Early life and education ==
Aung Lin Dwe was born on 31 May 1962. He graduated from the Defence Services Academy in 1984 as part of the 25th intake.

== Military and political career ==
From 2015 to 2016, he was the commander of the Western Command, which encompasses Rakhine and Chin States. He was forced to retire from military service in January 2022, but retained a seat in the State Administration Council (SAC).

He was a Union Solidarity and Development party-list candidate for Amyotha Hluttaw seat in Mandalay Region in the 2025–26 Myanmar general election. He was elected as the Speaker for the Amyotha Hluttaw. He was additionally sworn in as Speaker of the Pyidaungsu Hluttaw for the first half of the legislative session.

== Sanctions ==
The U.S. Department of the Treasury has imposed sanctions on Aung Lin Dwe since 11 February 2021, pursuant to Executive Order 14014, in response to the Myanmar's military coup against the democratically elected civilian government of Burma. The US sanctions include freezing of assets in the US and ban on transactions with US person.

The Government of Canada has imposed sanctions on him since 18 February 2021, pursuant to Special Economic Measures Act and Special Economic Measures (Burma) Regulations, in response to the gravity of the human rights and humanitarian situation in Myanmar (formerly Burma). Canadian sanctions include freezing of assets in Canada and a ban on transactions with Canadian persons.

HM Treasury and the Foreign, Commonwealth and Development Office of the United Kingdom have imposed sanctions on him since 25 February 2021, for his responsibility for serious human rights violations in Burma. The UK sanctions include freezing of assets in the UK and ban on traveling to or transiting through the UK.

The Council of the European Union has imposed sanctions on him since 22 March 2021, pursuant to Council Regulation (EU) 2021/479 and Council Implementing Regulation (EU) 2021/480 which amended Council Regulation (EU) No 401/2013, for his responsibility for the military coup and the subsequent military and police repression against peaceful demonstrators. The EU sanctions include freezing of assets in member countries of the EU and ban on traveling or transiting to the countries.

== Personal life ==
Aung Lin Dwe is married to Ohn Mar Myint (b. 1967), and has two sons, Hlaing Bwar Aung (b. 1993) and Phyo Arkar Aung (b. 1995), and one daughter, Shwe Ye Phu Aung (b. 1990). His children own Aung Myint Moh Lin and Mingalar Aung Myay construction companies and the Shwe Yee Phyo Pyae production company, all of which have won significant government tenders since the 2021 military coup. Aung Lin Dwe's niece, Su Myat Nandar Aung (also known as Su Lin Shein) is a MRTV-4 actress.

== See also ==
- State Administration Council
- Tatmadaw
