= Mon National Party =

- Burmese name: မွန်အမျိုးသားပါတီ
- Mon name: ဗော် ကောန်ဂကူ မန်
- Abbreviation: MNP
- Chairman: Naing Ngwe Thein
- Vice-Chairman: Naing Thet Lwin
- Secretary-General: Min Soe Lin
- Founded: 17 October 1988; 26 April 2012 (re-registered)
- Merged into: Mon Unity Party
- Headquarters: No 181, Yazadarid Road, Myaingtharyar Ward, Mawlamyine Township, Mon State, Myanmar
- Ideology: Mon nationalism Federalism
- Colours: Red
- Seats in the Amyotha Hluttaw: 1 / 224
- Seats in the Pyithu Hluttaw: 0 / 440
- Seats in the Mon State Hluttaw: 2 / 31

Party flag

The Mon National Party (MNP) was a political party in Myanmar (Burma).

== History ==
Established on 17 October 1988, the party was originally known as the Mon National Democratic Front (MNDF), and contested 19 seats in the 1990 general elections, winning five. The party's license was temporarily revoked in 1992. The MNDF joined the boycott of the 2010 general elections. The party was registered again on 26 April 2012, in order to contest the 2012 by-elections but failed to win any seats.

In 2014, the party adopted its current name. It fielded 53 candidates in the 2015 general elections, contesting seats in Mon, Thanintharyi and Kayin states, where a large number of Mon people live. The MNP's objectives include establishing a federal union in which the Mon people can have greater political autonomy.

In September 2018, the Mon National Party merged with the All Mon Region Democracy Party to form the Mon Unity Party
