= Aye Tha Aung =

Burmese politician

His Excellency Aye Tha Aung
- အေးသာအောင်
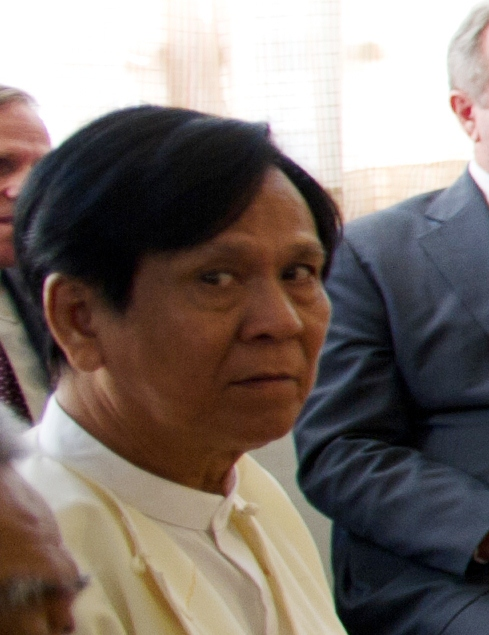
- Aye Tha Aung in 2011

3rd Deputy Speaker of the Assembly of the Union
- In office 8 February 2016 – 1 August 2018
- Preceded by: Nanda Kyaw Swa
- Succeeded by: Tun Tun Hein

2nd Deputy Speaker of the Amyotha Hluttaw
- In office 3 February 2016 – 31 January 2021
- Preceded by: Mya Nyein

Amyotha Hluttaw MP
- In office 3 February 2016 – 31 January 2021
- Constituency: Rakhine State No. 6 Myebon Township and Minbya Township

Personal details
- Born: December 10, 1945 (age 80) Myebon Township, Rakhine State, British Burma (now Myanmar)
- Party: Arakan National Party
- Parent(s): Nyo Ban, Aye Myaing
- Occupation: Politician

Military service
- Allegiance: Myanmar
- Branch/service: Myanmar Army
- Rank: Sergeant Major

Aye Tha Aung (Burmese: အေးသာအောင် [ʔé θà ʔàʊɴ] also spelt Aye Thar Aung; born: 10 December 1945) is a Burmese politician, former political prisoner and former Deputy Speaker of the Amyotha Hluttaw, the upper house of the Myanmar parliament. In the 2015 election, he contested and won the Rakhine State № 6 constituency for a seat in the country's upper house.

== Early life ==
He is an ethnic Rakhine and was born in Myebon Township, Rakhine State on 10 December 1945. He had only received a high school education. He previously served as a sergeant major in the Burmese Army and worked in the Military Industry Corporation. He was dismissed and imprisoned in Mandalay as a result of his underground political activities, and was released through an amnesty in 1974.

== Political career ==
Aye Tha Aung has worked with Aung San Suu Kyi since 1990 when he was a member of the Committee Representing the People’s Parliament (CRPP), formed by the National League for Democracy and victorious ethnic politicians to push for the convening of a parliament seating the 1990 election winners.

He was arrested in 2000 by military intelligence and was handed a 21-year jail sentence for breaking publication and emergency laws. He is believed to have undergone tough interrogation in prison, and has suffered various health problems and had neck surgery. He was released in 2002.

He is a strong defender of the rights of the Buddhist Rakhine people, but he is seen as a less strident nationalist than party leader Aye Maung.

He formerly chaired the Arakan League for Democracy that merged with the Rakhine Nationalities Development Party to form the Arakan National Party in 2014. He is a senior leader of the Arakan National Party, and a longtime political comrade of National League for Democracy leader Aung San Suu Kyi.

Following the 2021 Myanmar coup d'état on 1 February, Aye Tha Aung was placed under house arrest by the Myanmar armed forces.
