= Mya Nyein =

Burmese politician

- မြငြိမ်း

1st Deputy Speaker of the Amyotha Hluttaw
- In office 31 January 2011 – 29 January 2016
- Preceded by: Position established
- Succeeded by: Aye Thar Aung
- Majority: 106,069 (63.77%)

Amyotha Hluttaw MP
- In office 31 January 2011 – 29 January 2016
- Preceded by: Constituency established
- Succeeded by: Ye Myint Soe
- Constituency: Yangon Region № 7 Kayan, Thongwa, and Coco Island Townships

1st Deputy Speaker of the Assembly of the Union
- In office 31 January 2011 – 1 July 2013
- Preceded by: position established
- Succeeded by: Nanda Kyaw Swa

Personal details
- Born: Thandin Village, Hmawbi Township (Shwepyitha Township), Rangoon, Burma
- Party: USDP
- Education: LLB
- Occupation: Legal adviser in Central Institute of Civil Service (1973-74), Former Director General of the Office of Attorney General

Mya Nyein (Burmese: မြငြိမ်း) was the Deputy Speaker of the Amyotha Hluttaw, the upper house of Myanmar's parliament, the Pyidaungsu Hluttaw, elected to the post from 31 January 2011 to 29 January 2016. He was also the chairman of the Bills Committee in the Pyithu Hluttaw (2011–15).
