= Pyidaungsu Hluttaw =

Bicameral legislature of Myanmar

Coordinates: 19°46′28″N 96°6′13″E

Pyidaungsu Hluttaw ပြည်ထောင်စုလွှတ်တော်

Type
- Type: Bicameral
- Houses: Amyotha Hluttaw; Pyithu Hluttaw
- Term limits: 5 years

History
- Founded: 31 January 2011
- Preceded by: Pyithu Hluttaw (1974–1988)
- New session started: 20 March 2026

Leadership
- Speaker of the Pyidaungsu Hluttaw: Aung Lin Dwe since 20 March 2026
- Speaker of the Amyotha Hluttaw: Aung Lin Dwe since 18 March 2026
- Speaker of the Pyithu Hluttaw: Khin Yi since 16 March 2026

Structure
- Seats: 664; 224 Amyotha Hluttaw MPs; 440 Pyithu Hluttaw MPs
- Amyotha Hluttaw political groups: USDP (108); NUP (16); PP (5); MUP (5); KNDP (3); AFP (3); ZNP (3); PNO (2); PPP (1); SNDP (1); DNDP (1); NIDP (1); PSDP (1); TLNDP (1); KSPP (1); RNP (1); PNUP (1); KSPP (1); NNP (4); WNP (1); Vacant (11); Tatmadaw (56)
- Pyithu Hluttaw political groups: USDP (231); SNDP (7); PNO (5); MUP (5); NUP (4); NNP (4); DNDP (1); KNDP (1); INLP (1); KSPP (1); SSP (1); RNP (1); Independent (1); Vacant (67); Tatmadaw (110)

Elections
- Last Amyotha Hluttaw election: 2025–26
- Last Pyithu Hluttaw election: 2025–26

Meeting place
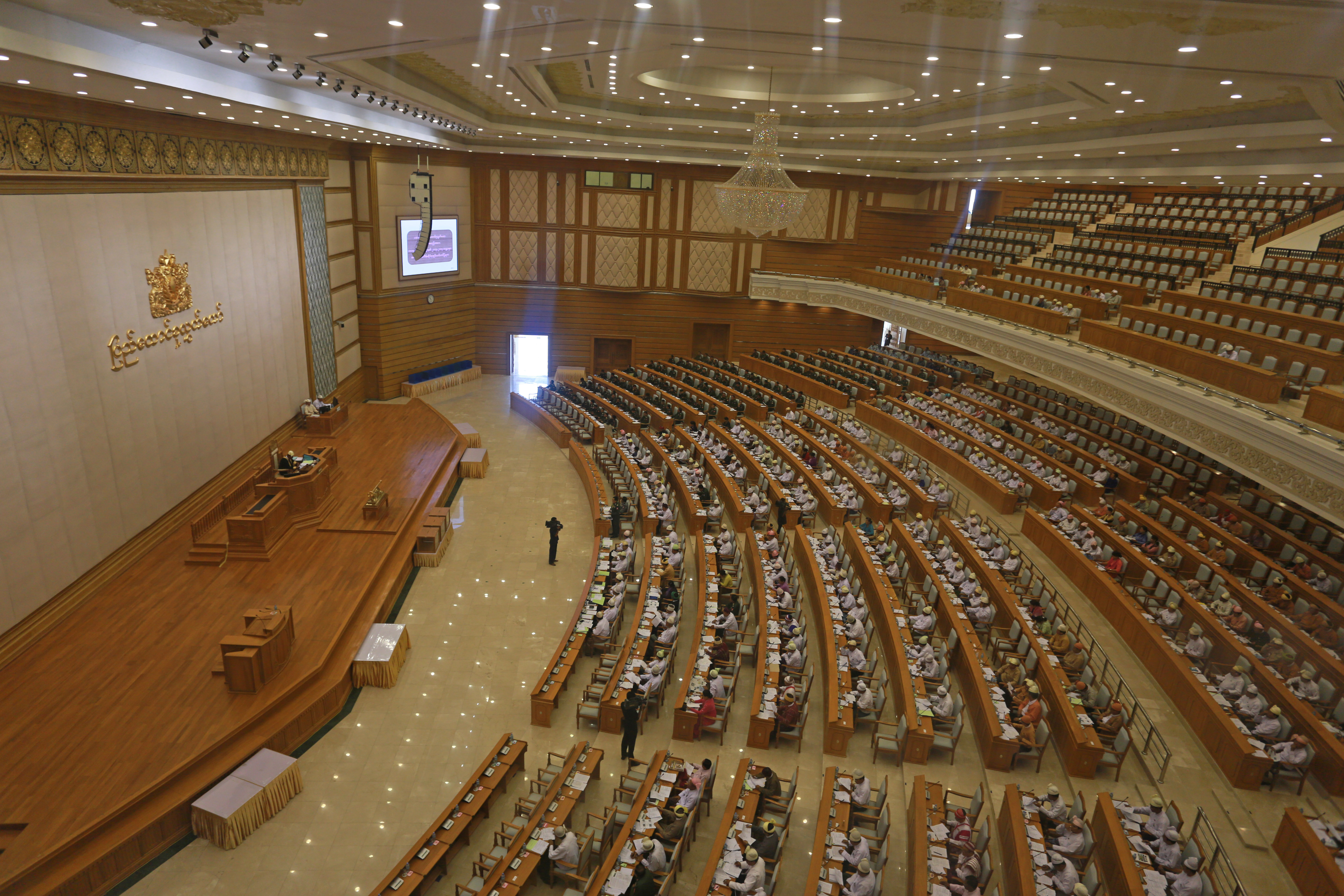
- Pyidaungsu Hluttaw Complex; Naypyidaw, Naypyidaw Union Territory

Website
- pyidaungsu.hluttaw.mm

Constitution
- Constitution of Myanmar

The Pyidaungsu Hluttaw (Burmese: ပြည်ထောင်စုလွှတ်တော် [pjìdàʊɰ̃zṵ l̥ʊʔtɔ̀], lit. 'Union Assembly') is the national-level bicameral legislature of Myanmar established by the 2008 National Constitution. The Pyidaungsu Hluttaw is made up of two houses, the 224-seat Amyotha Hluttaw, or "National Assembly", and the 440-seat Pyithu Hluttaw, or "People's Assembly". There is no mention in the 2008 Constitution of any "lower" or "upper" houses: both the Pyithu Hluttaw and the Amyotha Hluttaw enjoy equal power to initiate, review, amend, and pass legislation. Each of Myanmar's fourteen major administrative regions and states has its own local Hluttaw: Region Hluttaw (Region Assembly) or State Hluttaw (State Assembly).

Members of the second Pyidaungsu Hluttaw were elected in the 8 November 2015 general election. On 16 March 2012, parliamentarians made the decision for the Pyidaungsu Hluttaw to re-join the IPU. Due to the coup d'état on 1 February 2021, the day the new session was set to begin after the 2020 Myanmar general election, the new session did not start. Instead, the assembly was kept vacant for five years until the 2025–26 Myanmar general election, with the Pyithu Hluttaw convening on 16 March 2026, and the Amyotha Hluttaw convening on 18 March. The first day of the joint session of the full Pyidaungsu Hluttaw began on 20 March 2026, and Aung Lin Dwe was elected Speaker.

== Building ==
The Pyidaungsu Hluttaw is currently housed in a 31-building parliamentary complex in Naypyidaw. The complex was constructed by ACE Construction, owned by Tint San. It is believed to represent the 31 planes of existence in Buddhist cosmology, located in Zeya Theddhi Ward of Naypyidaw. The 2025 Myanmar earthquake on 28 March significantly damaged the complex.

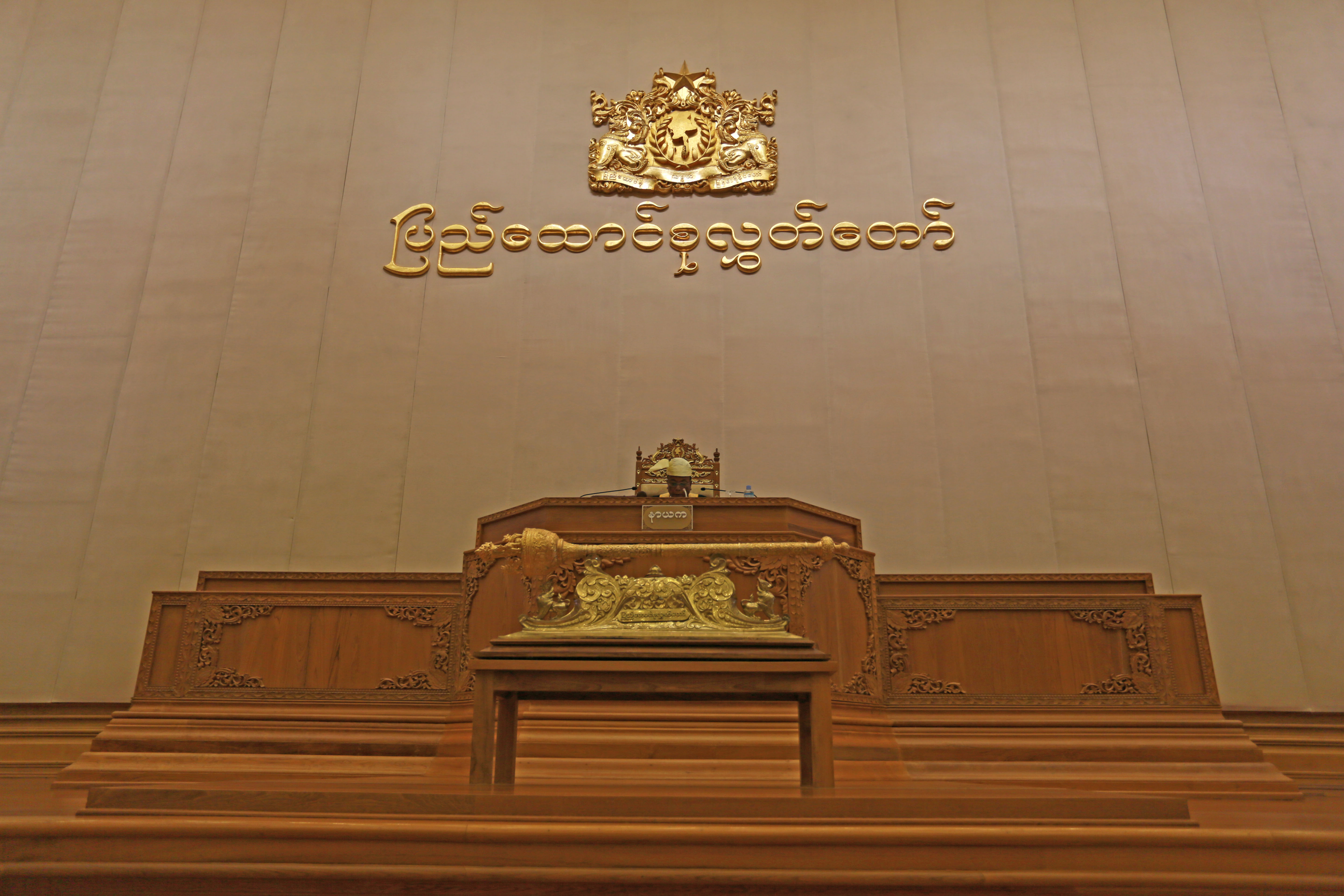
The speaker, Khin Aung Myint during the session of Hluttaw

== History ==
=== Pre-colonial era ===
The Nyilarkhan or Consultative Assembly (Burmese: ညီလာခံ lit. "Meeting between the King and Nobles") is an advisory body of the Burmese King. Consultative Assembly's origins trace back to the Pagan era when King Htilominlo (r. 1211–1235) created the Consultative Assembly to manage the day-to-day affairs of the government.

During the Konbaung dynasty, the Consultative Assembly was the centre of government and the kingdom's national administrative body, divided into three branches, namely fiscal, executive, and judicial (the word hluttaw was originally refers to the hall in the Royal Palace where the Nyilarkhan is host but since the colonial times, hluttaw has been used to describe a parliament or legislative body.) The Byedaik (ဗြဲတိုက်) or Privy Council maintained the inner affairs of the royal court, whereas the Hluttaw managed the kingdom's administration. The Nyilarkhan, as tradition, also had the duty of selecting the heir-apparent whenever the incumbent king did not select one. The last King of Burma, Thibaw Min was selected by the Nyilarkhan, making him the only recorded Monarch to be elected by the Consultative Assembly.

In the Konbaung dynasty, the Nyilarkhan was in session for 6 hours daily, from 6 to 9 am, and from noon to 3 pm, attended by ministers (မင်းကြီး, Mingyi), ministers of third rank (ဝန်ထောက်, Wundauk), and head clerks (စာရေးကြီး, Sayegyi), as well as interior ministers (အတွင်းဝန်, Atwin Wun), who sat in the Byedaik. It was tradition for the king to appoint four ministers, four interior ministers and four officers.

=== British Burma ===
On 2 January 1923, with the enactment of the Montagu–Chelmsford Reforms, Burma became a Governor's Province with a partially elected legislative council, the Legislative Council of Burma, consisting of 103 seats, with 80 filled by election.

The Government of Burma Act 1935 (26 Geo. 5 & 1 Edw. 8. c. 3) established the Legislature of Burma. During this period, the colonial Legislature consisted of two chambers, the 36-seat Senate and the 132-seat House of Representatives.

=== Union of Burma ===
From 1947 to 1962, under the 1947 Constitution, Burma's legislature, called the Union Parliament, consisted of two chambers, the 125-seat Lumyozu Hluttaw (the Chamber of Nationalities) and the 250-seat Pyithu Hluttaw; (the Chamber of Deputies), whose seat numbers were determined by the population size of respective constituencies.

=== Socialist Republic of the Union of Burma ===
From 1962 to 1974, there was no functional hluttaw in existence, as the ruling government was the socialist Revolutionary Council (RC).

From 1974 to 1988, under the 1974 Constitution, Burma's legislative branch was a one-party toy parliament consisting of a unicameral chamber, the Pyithu Hluttaw (the People's Assembly), represented by members of the Burma Socialist Programme Party. Each term was four years. (In August 2010, the old Hluttaw complex on Yangon's Pyay Road used by Gen. Ne Win's military government was slated for occupation by Yangon Division government offices.)

=== Union of Myanmar ===
Between 1988 and 2011, there was no functional hluttaw, as the ruling government was the State Peace and Development Council.

== Composition ==
Composition of Pyidaungsu Hluttaw
1. Elected; 330 Pyithu Hluttaw seats (49.7%)
2. Elected; 168 Amyotha Hluttaw seats (25.3%)
3. Unelected military appointments; 110 Pyithu Hluttaw seats (16.6%)
4. Unelected military appointments; 56 Amyotha Hluttaw seats (8.40%)

The Pyidaungsu Hluttaw (Union Assembly) is a bicameral body made up of a 440-seat Pyithu Hluttaw (People's Assembly) and the 224-seat Amyotha Hluttaw (National Assembly). The Pyidaungsu Hluttaw consists of 664 members in total. 75% of MPs (498 members) are directly elected by voters, while the remaining 25% (166 members) are military personnel appointed by the Defence Services' Commander-in-Chief. This policy is similar to Indonesia's New Order model (as part of the dwifungsi doctrine), which guaranteed a number of parliamentary seats to military appointees. The Pyidaungsu Hluttaw is sometimes translated as the Assembly of the Union.

=== Amyotha Hluttaw ===
The Amyotha Hluttaw is the upper house of the Pyidaungsu Hluttaw, with 12 seats accorded to each Region or State for a total of 168 directly elected seats. Of the 224 seats in the house, the remaining 56 are military appointees nominated by the Commander-in-Chief of the Defence Services. The Amyotha Hluttaw is sometimes referred to as the House of Nationalities.

=== Pyithu Hluttaw ===
The Pyithu Hluttaw is the lower house of the Pyidaungsu Hluttaw, with seats accorded to each of the 330 townships in the country. Of the 440 seats in this body, 330 are directly elected and 110 are military appointees nominated by the Commander-in-Chief of the Defence Services. The Pyithu Hluttaw is sometimes referred to as the House of Representatives

=== Elections ===
Burmese elections are held under universal suffrage for all Burmese citizens above the age of 18 and on a given constituency's roll of eligible voters. Voters are constitutionally guaranteed the right to vote via secret ballot. However, members of religious orders (including members of the Buddhist Sangha), prisoners, mentally unsound persons, and indebted persons are not allowed to vote for members of Parliament. Voting is not compulsory. Burmese elections practise the first-past-the-post voting system (winner takes all), in which the candidate who receives the highest number of votes is elected.

In the 2010 election, state media reported a voter turnout of 77.26%. Advance voting was also widely practised, with military personnel and their family members, as well as civil servants, police force personnel and other state employees instructed to vote in advance. This was in violation of the 2010 electoral laws, which only allow advance voting for eligible voters who are away from their constituencies, as well as overseas Burmese citizens. In some constituencies, up to 95% of cast ballots were done in advance. An estimated 10% of votes (6 million) were cast in advance. There were also reports of multiple voter fraud, voter manipulation, ghost voting and coerced voting, in which individuals were pressured to vote for Union Solidarity and Development Party candidates by officials.

== Term ==
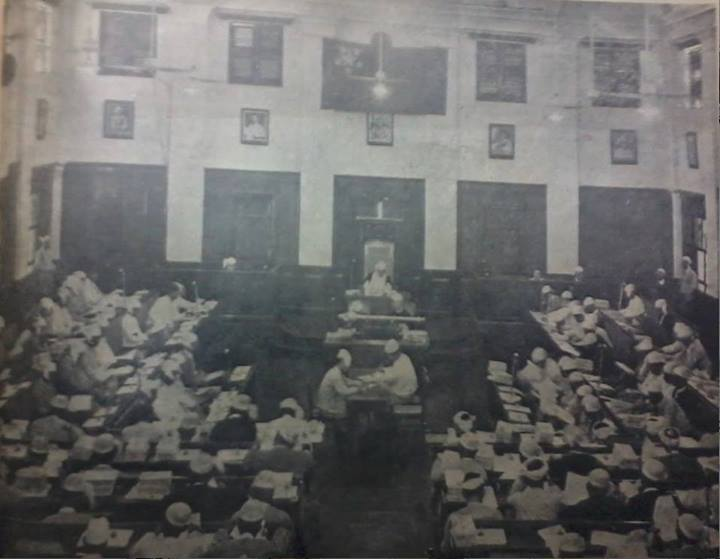
Chamber of Deputies (Pyithu Hluttaw) in Post-independence Burma

The two houses of the Pyidaungsu Hluttaw are simultaneously elected, with members of parliament (MPs) serving five-year terms. Ministerial nominees, who are selected from the pool of elected MPs, vacate their parliamentary seats. By-elections, determined by the Union Election Commission, are held to fill these vacant seats.

The first regular session of the Pyidaungsu Hluttaw must be convened within 15 days of the commencement of the Pyithu Hluttaw's first session. At least one regular session must be held per year, and subsequent sessions must be held within 12 months of each other. Special or emergency sessions can be convened by the President. Parliamentary sessions are only valid if 25% or more MPs are present.

The first session of the Pyidaungsu Hluttaw was held from January to March 2011, while the second was held from 22 August 2011 to. Journalists were not allowed to attend the first session. However, the Ministry of Information announced on 12 August 2011 that they would be permitted to attend the second session.

== See also ==
- Politics of Myanmar
- List of legislatures by country
- State and Region Hluttaws
