= Ministry of Ethnic Affairs =

Government ministry of Myanmar

- တိုင်းရင်းသားလူမျိုးများရေးရာဝန်ကြီးဌာန

Ministry overview
- Formed: 30 March 2016
- Jurisdiction: Myanmar
- Headquarters: Office No. (10), Nay Pyi Taw Myanmar
- Minister responsible: Saw Tun Aung Myint
- Child agencies: Department of Ethnic Literature and Culture; Department of Protection of Ethnic Rights
- Website: www.moea.gov.mm

Ministry of Ethnic Affairs (Burmese: တိုင်းရင်းသားလူမျိုးများရေးရာဝန်ကြီးဌာန) is a Myanmar government ministry formed by the President's Office Declaration No. 1/2016 on March 30, 2016 under President U Htin Kyaw. On May 25, 2016, the Ministry of Ethnic Affairs was renamed the Ministry of Ethnic Affairs to comply with the law protecting the rights of ethnic nationalities. The Union Minister for Ethnic Affairs is Saw Tun Aung Myint.

== Structure ==
Departments under the Ministry of Ethnic Affairs are:

- the Department of Ethnic Literature and Culture and
- the Department for the Protection of Ethnic Rights

== Union Ministers ==
- Naing Thet Lwin (30 March 2016 – 1 February 2021)
- Saw Tun Aung Myint (3 February 2021 – Incumbent)

== Region or State Ethnic Affairs Ministers ==
The Region or State Ethnic Affairs Ministers are as follows:

| While | Region / State | Minister | Department |
|---|---|---|---|
| 1 | Kachin State | U Khin Maung Myint (b) U Dit | Ministry of Burmese Ethnic Affairs |
| 2 | Kachin State | U Sai Sein Lin | Ministry of Shan Ethnic Affairs |
| 3 | Kachin State | U Ar Ti Yohan | Ministry of Lisu Ethnic Affairs |
| 4 | Kachin State | U Yan Nam Fon | Ministry of Rawan Ethnic Affairs |
| 5 | Kayah State | U Hla Myo Swe | Ministry of Burmese Ethnic Affairs |
| 6 | Karen State | U Tay Za Htut Hlaing Htwe | Ministry of Burmese Ethnic Affairs |
| 7 | Karen State | U Min Tin Win | Ministry of Mon Ethnic Affairs |
| 8 | Karen State | U Khun Myo Tint | Ministry of Pa-O Ethnic Affairs |
| 9 | Sagaing Region | Daw Hmwe Hmwe Khin | Ministry of Shan Ethnic Affairs |
| 10 | Sagaing Region | U Lal Htaung Thang | Ministry of Chin Ethnic Affairs |
| 11 | Tanintharyi Region | U Saw Lu Ka | Ministry of Karen Ethnic Affairs |
| 12 | Bago Region | Daw Naw Pwe Se | Ministry of Karen Ethnic Affairs |
| 13 | Magway Region | U Hla Tun | Ministry of Chin Ethnic Affairs |
| 14 | Mandalay Region | U Sai Pan Saing | Ministry of Shan Ethnic Affairs |
| 15 | Mon State | U Shwe Myint | Ministry of Burmese Ethnic Affairs |
| 16 | Mon State | Daw San Wint Khaing | Ministry of Pa-O Ethnic Affairs |
| 17 | Mon State | U Aung Myint Khaing | Ministry of Karen Ethnic Affairs |
| 18 | Rakhine State | U Pon Bwe | Ministry of Chin Ethnic Affairs |
| 19 | Yangon Region | Daw Pan Thinzar Myo | Ministry of Karen Ethnic Affairs |
| 20 | Yangon Region | U Zaw Aye Maung | Ministry of Rakhine Ethnic Affairs |
| 21 | Shan State | Dr. Aung Than Maung | Ministry of Burmese Ethnic Affairs |
| 22 | Shan State | U Zut Daung | Ministry of Kachin Ethnic Affairs |
| 23 | Shan State | U Gusa | Ministry of Lisu Ethnic Affairs |
| 24 | Shan State | U Joseph | Ministry of Lahu Ethnic Affairs |
| 25 | Shan State | U Ar Be Hla | Ministry of Akha Ethnic Affairs |
| 26 | Shan State | Dr. Tun Hlaing | Ministry of Inthar Ethnic Affairs |
| 27 | Shan State | U Khun Aye Maung | Kayan (b) Padaung Ministry of Ethnic Affairs |
| 28 | Ayeyarwady Region | Ga Moe Myat Myat Thu | Ministry of Karen Ethnic Affairs |
| 29 | Ayeyarwady Region | U Tin Saw | Ministry of Rakhine Ethnic Affairs |
