= Excellency =

Honorific style

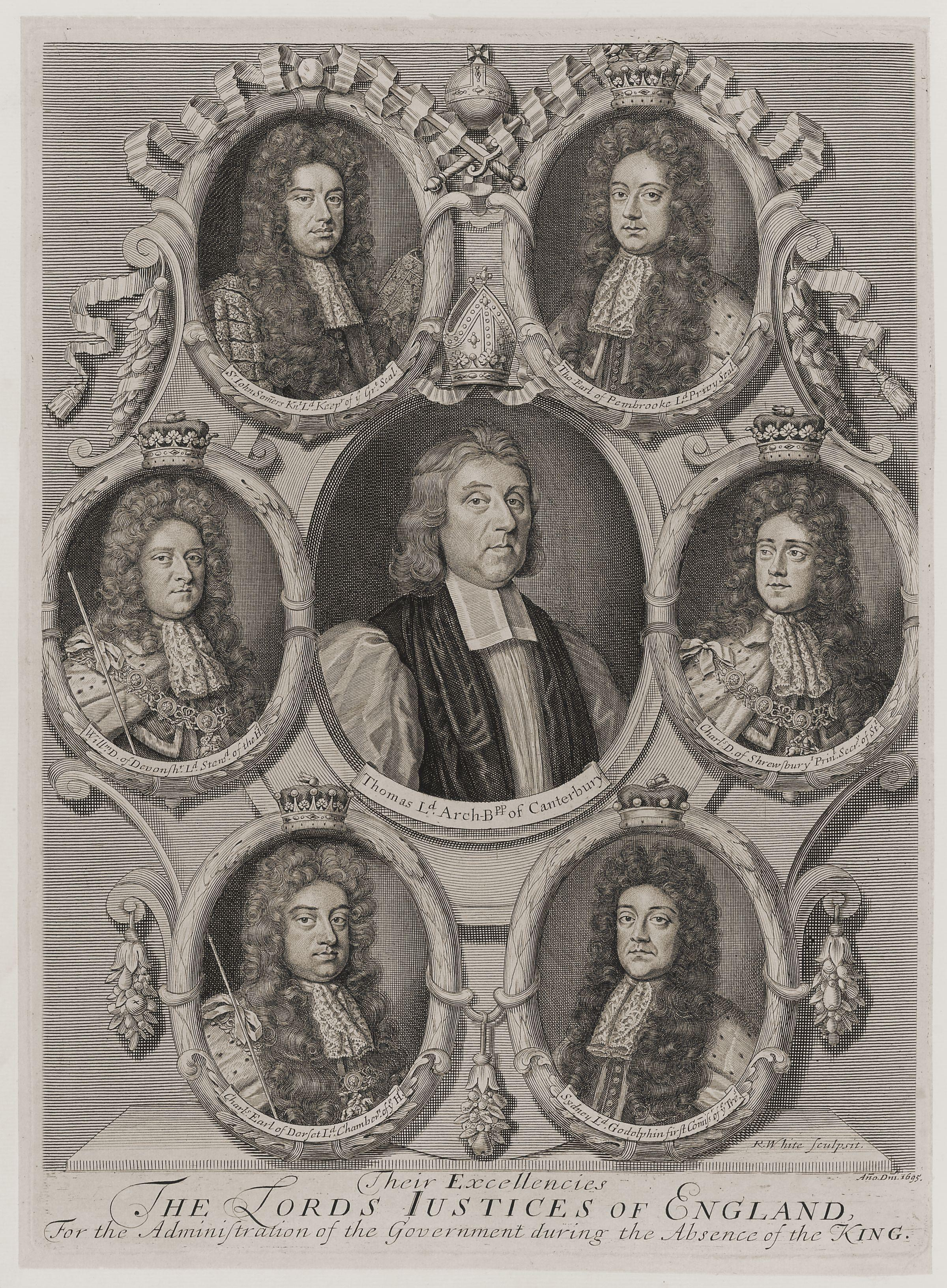
Their Excellencies the Lords Justices of England, for the administration of the Government during the absence of the King by Robert White.

Excellency is an honorific style given to certain high-level officers of a sovereign state, officials of an international organization, or members of an aristocracy. Once entitled to the title "Excellency", the holder usually retains the right to that courtesy throughout their lifetime, although in some cases the title is attached to a particular office and can be held only during tenure of that office.

Generally people addressed as Excellency are heads of state (other than monarchs), heads of government, governors, ambassadors, Catholic bishops, and others holding equivalent rank, such as heads of international organizations. Members of royal families generally have distinct addresses such as Majesty, Highness, etc.

While not a title of office itself, the honorific Excellency precedes various titles held by the holder, both in speech and in writing. In reference to such an official, it takes the form His or Her Excellency; in direct address, Your Excellency; in salutations, either Your Excellency or simply Excellency. The abbreviation HE is often used instead of His/Her Excellency; alternatively it may stand for His Eminence/Her Eminence.

== Government ==
=== Heads of state and government ===
In most republican nation states, the head of state is formally referred to as His or Her Excellency.

If a republic has a separate head of government, that official is almost always addressed as Excellency as well. If the nation is a monarchy, however, the customs may vary. For example, in the case of Australia, all ambassadors, high commissioners, state governors and the governor-general and their spouses are entitled to the use of Excellency.

Governors of colonies in the British Empire were entitled to be addressed as Excellency and this remains the position for the governors of what are now known as British Overseas Territories.

=== International diplomacy ===
In various international organizations, notably the UN and its agencies, Excellency is used as a generic form of address for all republican heads of state and heads of government. It is often granted to the organization's head as well, and to those chiefs of UN diplomatic missions, such as Resident Coordinators (who are the designated representatives of the secretary-general), who are accredited at the head of state level (like an ambassador), or at the lower head of government level. The Secretary-General of any international organization is accorded the style ‘His/Her Excellency’.

=== International judiciary ===
Judges of the International Court of Justice also enjoy the style of Excellency.

== Monarchy ==
=== Royalty ===
In some monarchies the husbands, wives, or children of a royal prince or princess, who do not possess a princely title themselves, may be entitled to the style. For example, in Spain spouses or children of a born infante or infanta are addressed as Excellency, if not accorded a higher style.

Former members of a royal house or family, who have forfeited a royal title, may be awarded the style afterwards. Examples are former husbands or wives of a royal prince or princess, including Alexandra, Countess of Frederiksborg, following her divorce from Prince Joachim of Denmark. Likewise, Count Carl Johan Bernadotte of Wisborg, who lost his succession rights to the Swedish throne and discontinued use of his royal titles in 1946 when he married the commoner Elin Kerstin Margaretha Wijkmark, was accorded the style.

In some emirates, such as Kuwait and Qatar, the Emir, heir apparent and prime minister are called His Highness. Their children are styled with His/Her Excellency unless they possess a higher honorific.

=== Nobility ===
In Spain members of the high nobility, holding the dignity of grandee, are referred to as The Most Excellent Lord/Lady.

In Denmark, some counts (lensgrever), historically those related by blood or marriage to the Danish monarch, who have entered a morganatic marriage or otherwise left the Royal Family have the right to be styled as Your Excellency, e.g., the Counts of Danneskiold-Samsøe, some of the counts of Rosenborg and the Countess of Frederiksborg (ad personam).

In the subnational monarchy Sultanate of Sulu, senior nobility and holders of royal offices that are granted the title of Datu Sadja are referred to as His/Her Excellency.

=== Knights ===
Excellency can also attach to a prestigious quality, notably in an order of knighthood. For example, in the Empire of Brazil, it was attached to the highest classes, each time called Grand Cross, of all three imperial orders: Imperial Order of Pedro I, Imperial Order of the Southern Cross with the military honours of a Lieutenant general and Order of the Rose.

Knights of the Collar and Knights Grand Cross of the Spanish Orders of Chivalry, such as the Order of Charles III, Order of Isabella the Catholic, Order of Civil Merit, Order of Alfonso X the Wise, Royal Order of Sports Merit, Civil Order of Health, as well as recipients of the Grand Cross of Military, Naval, and Aeronautical Merit are addressed as such. Furthermore, Knights Grand Cross of the Order of the Holy Sepulchre of Jerusalem, Order of Saint Gregory the Great, and the Order of St. Sylvester of the Holy See, and Grand Cross of The Lion, Crested Crane, Crown, and The Drum of Rwanda, and Knights of the Order of the Golden Fleece, and Knights Grand Cross of several other orders of high prestige, are often addressed as Excellency.

== Ecclesiastical use ==
By a decree of the Sacred Congregation of Ceremonial of 31 December 1930, the Holy See granted bishops of the Catholic Church the title of Most Reverend Excellency or Excellentia Reverendissima in Latin. In the years following the First World War, the ambassadorial title of Excellency, previously given to nuncios, had already begun to be used by other Catholic bishops. The adjective Most Reverend was intended to distinguish the religious title from that of Excellency given to civil officials.

The instruction Ut sive sollicite of the Holy See's Secretariat of State, dated 28 March 1969, made the addition of Most Reverend optional, sanctioning what had always been the practice, except possibly for the beginnings of letters and the like.

According to the letter of the decree of 31 December 1930, titular patriarchs of the eastern rites were to be addressed with the title of (Most Reverend) Excellency, but in practice the Holy See continued to address them with the title of Beatitude, which was formally sanctioned for them by Pope Pius XII in his motu proprio, Cleri sanctitati of 2 June 1957.

Cardinals, even those who were bishops, continued to use the title of Eminence.

Eastern Orthodox titular metropolitans are addressed with the style of Excellency.

In some English-speaking countries, the honorific of Excellency does not apply to bishops other than the nuncio. In English law, Anglican archbishops are granted the title of His/Her Grace, similar to a duke, and bishops are granted the title of Lord. The same titles are extended by courtesy to their Catholic counterparts, and continue in use in most countries that are or have been members of the Commonwealth, with the exception of the former British East African countries of Kenya, Uganda or Tanzania.

== By country ==
=== Afghanistan ===
In Afghanistan the title Jalalat Mahab is used for Sardars, or Princes of the former Muhammadzai Dynasty, who are descendants of the Afghan King Sultan Mohammed Khan Telai. Although Jalalat Mahab is derived from the Arabic term Jalalat literally meaning His Majesty, it is regarded as equal to His Excellency or His Royal Highness internationally.

The descendants of King Nadir Shah held the title Alaa Hazrat in which context Hazrat is Turkish and means Majesty or Highness and thus literally translated means Higher Majesty or Higher Highness and is internationally also equal to His Royal Highness. The King himself held the title Alaa Hazrat Humayoon which literally translated means His Most Noble Majesty, and can be equalized with His Majesty internationally. President Daoud Khan, the Cousin of the last Afghan King Zahir Shah, who acted as prime minister under his cousin held the address Jalalat Mahab Aali Qadr Sardari Alaa during his term as Prime Minister.

=== Albania ===
The president, the chairman of the Parliament and the prime minister are referred to as His/Her Excellency.

=== Armenia ===
The president, the prime minister, the chairman of the Parliament, as well as ministers and ambassadors of Armenia are addressed as Excellency, which in Armenian is Ձերդ գերազանցութիւն, Romanized Dzerd gerazancutiwn. The members of the traditional Armenian nobility are also addressed as Excellency, which in Armenian it is Ձերդ պայծառութիւն Romanized as Dzerd paytzarrowtiwn, literally Your Brightness.

=== Bangladesh ===
In Bangladesh the president, prime minister, chief adviser, the speaker of the Parliament and international diplomats are styled with His/Her Excellency.

=== Barbados ===
The president, is styled with His/Her Excellency formally while their informal title is "Mr./Madam President".

=== Belgium ===
Members of the Council of Ministers of Belgium, consisting of the prime minister, deputy prime minister(s) and other ministers, but also Secretaries of state, and honorary ministers of state, are entitled to the style of His/Her Excellency.

The style is also used for the governors of Belgium, which are governors of the ten provinces of Belgium, governor of Brussels, governor of the national bank of Belgium and both foreign ambassadors in Belgium and Belgian ambassadors to other countries.

Moreover, within the Catholic Church in Belgium, the (arch-)bishops and (pro-)nuntia are referred to as His Excellency Monsignor or Zijne Excellentie Monseigneur in Dutch, Son Excellence Monseigneur in French and Seine Exzellenz Monsignore in German .

=== Brazil ===
In 1991, the Office of the President issued a composition manual to establish the appropriate usage of the Portuguese language for all government agencies. The manual states that the title of Excelência (Excellency) is the proper form used to address the President and Vice President of the Republic, all members of congress and judges, among other officials.

The form of address to be used in communications directed to the heads of the branches of government is The Most Excellent Mister/Madam (Brazilian Portuguese: Excelentíssimo Senhor/Excelentíssima Senhora), followed by the respective title: The Most Excellent Mister President of the Republic (executive), The Most Excellent Mister President of the Board of the National Congress (legislative), and The Most Excellent Mister President of the Federal Supreme Court (judiciary).

Article 3 of Federal Law No. 12.830/2013, regulating criminal investigations conducted by police chiefs stipulates that the position of police chief is reserved for holders of a law degree and that they are entitled to the same formal mode of address (Your Excellency) accorded to magistrates, members of the Public Defender's Office and the Public Ministry, and lawyers.

=== Cambodia ===
In the Kingdom of Cambodia, deputy prime ministers, senior ministers, members of the Council of Ministers, secretary of state, and members of Parliament are referred to as "His/Her Excellency" (Khmer: ឯកឧត្ដម, Êk Ŏtdâm/លោកជំទាវ, Loŭk Chumtéav).

=== Commonwealth of Nations ===
Within the Commonwealth of Nations, the following officials usually use the style His or Her Excellency:

- The Commonwealth secretary-general;
- Presidents of Commonwealth republics;
- Governors and governors-general, and the spouses of governors-general;
- Commonwealth high commissioners (but not their spouses);
- Foreign ambassadors (but not their spouses);
- Foreign dignitaries who are entitled to the style in their own countries.

While reference may be made to the King's Most Excellent Majesty, the style Excellency is not used with reference to the King.

=== Chile ===
The president of Chile and the president of the Chamber of Deputies of Chile are referred to by the style "His/Her Excellency".

=== Finland ===
The president of Finland and prime minister of Finland are both referred to by the style "His/Her Excellency" in international diplomacy.

=== Germany ===
The president of Germany and chancellor of Germany are both referred to by the style "Excellency" in international diplomacy, albeit not domestically.

=== India ===
The president of India and governors of Indian states are addressed as Rashtrapati Mahoday/Rashtrapati Mahodaya (if lady) (राष्ट्रपति महोदय / राष्ट्रपति महोदया (if lady), Honourable President) and Rajyapal Mahoday/Rajyapal Mahodaya (if lady) (राज्यपाल महोदय /राज्यपाल महोदया (if lady), Honourable Governor) respectively.

His/Her Excellency, a custom dating from the ancient times wherein the Samrāṭa and Sāmrājñī (सम्राट, साम्राज्ञी / Emperor, Empress), Generals, Kings, Ambassadors were addressed. A classic example is addressing Devavrata (Bhishma) as महामहिम भीष्म (His/Your Excellency Bhishma) in Mahabharata.

However the Constitution makers approved will discontinue "ancient era" styles of Mahamahim. The same release states that in English (which is the other language in which subsidiary official communications are released in the Central Government of India in its capacity of Sahayak Rajbhasha: Subsidiary Officiating language) the style Honourable shall replace the erstwhile His/Her/Your Excellency. The newer style will be Honourable.

The corresponding changes in releases from the President's Secretariat shall be from Mahamahim to Rashtrapati-ji. The release also talks about the styles of other dignitaries, like governors. "Hon'ble" will be used before the titles "president" and "governor", while the traditional honorifics Shri or Smt. (Shrimati) should precede the name.

However, "Excellency" will continue to be used, only for interaction of leaders with foreign dignitaries and foreign dignitaries with Indian leaders as is customary international practice.

=== Ireland ===
The president of Ireland is addressed as Your Excellency or in the Irish language, a Shoilse (literally, "brightness (voc)". Alternatively, one may address the president simply as President or in the Irish language a Uachtaráin.

=== Italy ===
The president of Italy and the prime minister of Italy (officially called President of the Council of Ministers) are referred to as "His/Her Excellency" in international diplomacy. Furthermore, the terms "president" and "premier" are used as well. This latter is an informal and common address for the prime minister of Italy. For both institutional charges, the term "president" is usually exploited in formal and informal situations.

=== Jordan ===
Like many countries that once formed part of the Ottoman Empire, His/Her Excellency is used as the style for those with the title of Bey or Pasha. In Arabic the latter titles are often included between the first and last names of the holder, while in English the titles are not usually included and the style of His/Her Excellency is used on its own. Those styled this way include government ministers, senior military officers, and the husbands and children of Princesses.

=== Kenya ===
The president of Kenya is referred to as "His/Her Excellency".

The governors of the counties and diplomats are also referred to as "His/Her Excellency".

=== Malaysia ===
The governors (Yang di-Pertua Negeri) of Melaka, Penang, Sabah, and Sarawak are referred to as "His Excellency" (Tuan Yang Terutama). High commissioners and ambassadors are also referred to as "His/Her Excellency" (Tuan/Puan Yang Terutama).

=== Monaco ===
The Minister of State, who acts as the Prime Minister of the Principality, is referred to as "His Excellency".

=== Myanmar ===
The president of Myanmar, first lady, state counsellor, vice-presidents of Myanmar, speaker of the Pyidaungsu Hluttaw, speaker of the House of Nationalities, speaker of the House of Representatives of Myanmar, governor of the Central Bank of Myanmar, members of the Cabinet of Myanmar, chief ministers of states and regions of Myanmar, mayors and ambassadors are referred to as "His/Her Excellency" while justices of the Supreme Court of Myanmar are referred to as "The Honourable".

=== The Netherlands ===
Members of the cabinet of the Netherlands (prime minister, deputy prime minister(s), other ministers, and state secretaries), but also honorary ministers of state, are entitled to the style of "His/Her Excellency".

The style is also used for the executive officers of the Dutch royal court (great officers of the Royal House, hofmarschall, equerries), governors of the constituent countries of the Kingdom of the Netherlands (Aruba, Curaçao, and Sint Maarten), ambassadors (both foreign ambassadors in the Netherlands and Dutch ambassadors to other countries), judges of the International Court of Justice, and flag- and general officers of three-star rank and above (generals, lieutenant-generals, lieutenant-admirals, and vice-admirals).

Moreover, within the Catholic Church in the Netherlands, the (arch-)bishops and (pro-)nuntia are referred to as "His Most Reverend Excellency" (i.e. in Dutch as Zijne Hoogwaardige Excellentie).

=== Nigeria ===
The president of Nigeria and vice-president of Nigeria share the style "His/Her Excellency" with the various governors and their deputies of the country's regional states as well as their wives.

=== Peru ===
The president of Peru is referred to as "His/Her Excellency" (In Spanish: Su Excelencia) if in diplomatic context.

=== Philippines ===
The president (Filipino: pangulo; Spanish and colloquially: presidente) is addressed in English as "Your Excellency" and "Sir" or "Ma'am" thereafter, and is referred to "His/Her Excellency". The president can also less formally be addressed as "Mister/Madam President". In Filipino, the president may be referred to with the more formal title of "Ang Mahál na Pangulo", with "mahál" connoting greatness and high social importance. (Note: The Tagalog word "mahál" is often translated as "love" and "expensive", but its original sense has a range of meanings from "treasured" to "the most valuable". It is often applied to royalty, roughly equivalent to the Western "Majesty" (e.g. Mahál na Harì, "His Majesty, the King"; Kamahalan, "Your Majesty"), and at times used for lower-ranking nobles in the manner of "Highness", which has the more exact translation of Kataás-taasan. It is also found in religious contexts, such as referring to Catholic patron saints, the Blessed Virgin Mary (e.g. Ang Mahál na Ina/Birhen), or Christ (e.g., Ang Mahál na Poóng Nazareno).)

Populist president Rodrigo Duterte has expressed dislike for the traditional title. After assuming office in June 2016, he ordered that the title, along with all honorifics, be dropped from official communications, events, and materials but instead, he be addressed only as "Mayor" since people are already used to calling him as such due to Duterte being the longest-serving mayor of Davao City and that his cabinet officials only be addressed as "Secretary". Other government officials followed suit by abandoning use of "The Honorable". However, despite the prior unofficial abandonment, the president continues to be addressed as "Excellency" in formal correspondences and petitions, either verbally or written.

All other local and national government officials are styled "The Honorable"; both titles, however, may be glossed in Filipino as Ang Kagalang-galang.

=== Portugal ===
In Portugal, the proper style of the president is "His/Her Excellency" (Portuguese: Sua Excelência).

=== Somalia ===
The president of Somalia is referred to as "His/Her Excellency" or "Jaale". Jaale was also a title used by armed forces staff officers of all branches, especially in the Aden Adde-Shermarke Era, and the Barre Era but is now rare and has become a title for civil servants and senior government secretaries.

=== South Africa ===
The president of South Africa (and historically the state president of the South African Republic), is (and was) referred to as "His/Her Excellency" if in a formal context.

=== South Korea ===
The president of South Korea is referred to as "His/Her Excellency" (Korean: 각하, romanized: gagha) if in a formal context both inside and outside of South Korea.

=== Spain ===
Spain uses the title "The Most Excellent" extensively as a formal address to high officers of the state. The following officials receive the treatment:

- The prime minister and former prime ministers, current and former deputy prime ministers of the central government, current and former government ministers, current junior ministers (secretaries of state) and the undersecretary of the Foreign Ministry.
- Government delegates.
- Ambassadors and ministers plenipotentiaries of first and second rank.
- Captain generals, generals of the army, admiral generals, generals of the Air, lieutenant generals, admirals, divisional generals, vice-admirals, brigadier generals, and counter admirals.
- The president, councillors, and secretary general of the Council of State, as well as the chief counsels of the Council of State.
- The president and former presidents of each of the autonomous communities, as well as the sitting councillors (regional ministers).
- The president of the Congress of Deputies, the president of the Senate, all members of the Cortes Generales (although the later are usually referred to as "His/Her Lordship" (sp. Su señoría).
- The members of the General Council of the Judiciary, the president and the judges of the Spanish Supreme Court, the Spanish Attorney General, and the members of the Spanish Constitutional Court.
- The presidents and numeraries of the eight Royal Academies.
- The governor of the Bank of Spain.
- The presidents of the three Foral Deputation (provincial governments) of the Basque Country, and the president of the Deputation of Barcelona.
- The rectors of the Universities (usually referred to as His/Her Excellency and Magnificence).
- Grandees of Spain and their consort, as well the Heirs of Grandees and their consort
- Knights/Dames of the Collar and Knights/Dames Grand Cross of the Spanish military and civilian orders

The style "His Excellency", which has a higher connotation than "The Most Excellent", is instead reserved for the children of an Infante or Infanta, who have the rank (but not the title) of Grandees.

=== Sri Lanka ===
The president of Sri Lanka was referred to as His/Her Excellency. This was until 2022, when President Ranil Wickremesinghe banned the use. However, it is still used diplomatically.

=== Sweden ===
The Swedish language titles and forms of address are Hans/Hennes Excellens (His/Her Excellency) and Ers Excellens (Your Excellency).

During most of the 20th century in Sweden, only three officials (other than foreign ambassadors accredited in Sweden and Swedish ambassadors at their posts) were granted to the style of Excellency: the prime minister, the minister for foreign affairs and the marshal of the realm (the highest ranking courtier). They were collectively referred to as "the three excellencies" (Swedish: de tre excellenserna). In the 1970s it fell out of custom in Sweden to address the prime minister and the minister of foreign affairs as such, although they continue to be addressed as such in United Nations protocol and in other diplomatic writing. Since then only the Marshal of the Realm uses the style regularly.

Prior to the 19th century, a Lord of the Realm (Swedish: En af Rikets Herrar) and a member of the Council of the Realm were also entitled to the style of Excellency.

=== Thailand ===
The prime Minister of Thailand, deputy prime ministers, other cabinet members, governors and ambassadors are referred to as "His/Her Excellency".

=== Turkey ===
In the English language, the president and the vice-president, cabinet ministers, ambassadors, and some other high-ranking bureaucrats are addressed as Excellency.

In the Turkish language, honorific titles are no longer used since the 1923 modernisation of the language; under Atatürk's Reforms. Instead of Excellency, dignitaries are addressed using the Turkish word for Honorable (Turkish: Sayın) followed by their office. For example, an ambassador of Turkey would be addressed simply as Honorable Ambassador (Turkish: Sayın Büyükelçi). It is important to emphasise that this distinction only applies when speaking in the Turkish language, not in English. Additionally, in very rare ceremonial circumstances, the word Excellency is used in Turkish. An example would be the formal accreditation of a Turkish ambassador, wherein the letter of confidence authored by the Turkish president would address the ambassador as Excellency (Turkish: Ekselansları).

=== United States ===
In the United States, the form Excellency was commonly used for George Washington during his service as commander-in-chief of the Continental Army and later when president of the United States, but it began to fall out of use with his successor John Adams, and today is sometimes replaced in direct address with the simple Mr. President or the Honorable.

Nevertheless, in the protocol of many foreign countries and United Nations, the president and the secretary of state are usually referred to as Excellency. Diplomatic correspondence to President Abraham Lincoln during the American Civil War, as during the Trent Affair, for instance, frequently addressed him as Your Excellency.

The form Excellency was used for the governors of most of the original Thirteen Colonies, and the practice formally continued after independence. For example, the term was formerly used in Georgia on the state governor's letterhead, the text of executive orders, any document that required the governor's signature, and informal settings. However, in most states the practice fell out of use (or was never introduced) and the title Honorable is now used instead.

Though the U.S. president and U.S. ambassadors are traditionally accorded the style elsewhere, the U.S. government does not usually use Excellency for its own chiefs of missions, preferring Honorable instead.

== See also ==
- Canadian honorifics
- Ecclesiastical titles and styles
- His Excellency (opera)
- Style (manner of address)

== Notes ==
Catholic Church	Style
Pope	His Holiness
Cardinal	His Eminence
Bishop	His Excellency
