= 2011 Myanmar presidential election =

2011 indirect election for the Myanmar head of state/government

- 4 February 2011

654 members of the Electoral College 328 electoral votes needed to win
- Turnout: 654 (99.24%)
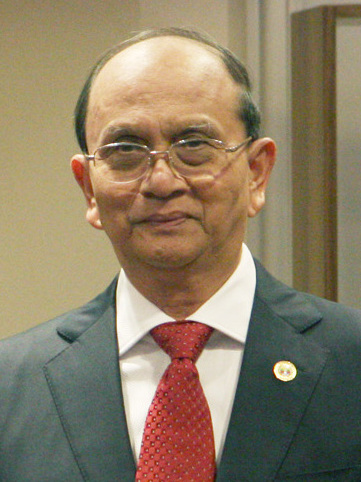

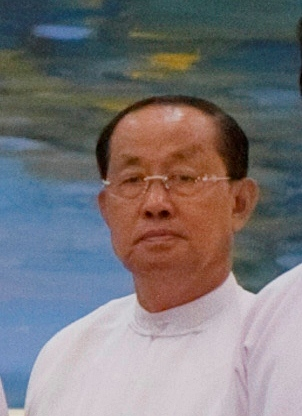

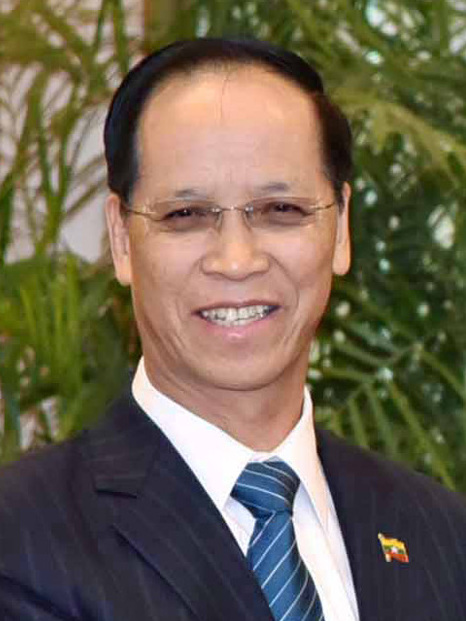
Nominee	Thein Sein	Tin Aung Myint Oo	Sai Mauk Kham
Party	USDP	USDP	USDP
Electoral vote	408	171	75
Percentage	62.39%	26.15%	11.47%
Committee	Pyithu Hluttaw	Tatmadaw	Amyotha Hluttaw
Chairman of the SPDC before election
Than Shwe
Tatmadaw
President after election
Thein Sein (President)
Tin Aung Myint Oo (1st Vice President)
Sai Mauk Kham (2nd Vice President)

Indirect presidential elections were held in Myanmar on 4 February 2011, after the 2010 general election. Members of the Assembly of the Union voted for the country's President, and two Vice-Presidents.

The elections led the way to the first nominally civilian president in 49 years. Previously, the country had been run by a military junta, known as the State Peace and Development Council. The elections were the first presidential elections held under the new 2008 constitution.

Thein Sein, Tin Aung Myint Oo, and Sai Mauk Kham were elected President, First Vice-President, and Second-Vice President respectively. All were members of the Union Solidarity and Development Party.

== Background ==
Myanmar, previously known as Burma, has been under a dictatorship for the majority of its independent history. First, under Ne Win and his Burma Socialist Programme Party, and then under a military junta. In 2007, large scale demonstrations took place during the Saffron Revolution, which was organized by the vast monastic community of Myanmar. The revolution was suppressed, but lead to political reforms and the 2008 constitution.

The first elections held under the new constitution occurred in 2010. They were considered semi-free, but their legitimacy was question by some. In addition, the major opposition, the National League for Democracy boycotted the election, objecting to the continued imprisonment of their leader, Aung San Suu Kyi. The boycott resulted in a massive landslide for the Union Solidarity and Development Party, which is backed by the Tatmadaw (military).

== Electoral system ==
Under the 2008 constitution, Myanmar has a President, and two Vice-Presidents. They are elected by the Pyidaungsu Hluttaw, the national legislature.

The Pyidaungsu Hluttaw consists of two chambers, Pyithu Hluttaw, and Amyotha Hluttaw. Most seats are directly elected, but a quarter of the seats in both chambers are appointed by the Tatmadaw.

Chamber	Type	MPs
Pyithu Hluttaw	Directly-elected	330
Pyithu Hluttaw	Military-appointed	110
Amyotha Hluttaw	Directly-elected	168
Amyotha Hluttaw	Military-appointed	56

The Presidential Electoral College is made up of three committees:

- The directly elected MPs from Pyithu Hluttaw (330).
- The directly elected MPs from Amyotha Hluttaw (168).
- The military appointees in both chambers (166).

Each committee nominates a single candidate. The whole Pyidaungsu Hluttaw then votes, with all three nominees on the ballot together and each of the 664 MPs being entitled to one vote. The vote is a secret ballot. The candidate that receives the highest number of votes is President, the candidate with the second highest number of votes is 1st Vice-President, and the remaining candidate is 2nd Vice-President. This system guarantees the military at least one Vice-President.

== Candidates ==
The candidates were nominated on 3 February 2011.

=== Pyithu Hluttaw committee ===
Thein Sein was nominated by the committee from Pyithu Hluttaw. He was a member of that body from the Zabuthiri Township. He had been the Prime Minister of Myanmar until that position was abolished after the 2010 general election, and he had served as the First Secretary of the State Peace and Development Council, from 2004 to 2007.

Candidate	Party	Votes	%
Thein Sein	Union Solidarity and Development Party	276	87.90
Saw Thein Aung	Phalon-Sawaw Democratic Party	38	12.10
Total		314	100.00
Registered voters/turnout		325	–
Source: Mizzima

Five Pyithu Hluttaw seats were vacant.

=== Amyotha Hluttaw committee ===
Sai Mauk Kham was nominated by the committee from Amyotha Hluttaw. He was not a member of parliament.

Candidate	Party	Votes	%
Sai Mauk Kham	Union Solidarity and Development Party	140	83.83
Aye Maung	Rakhine Nationalities Development Party	27	16.17
Total		167	100.00
Registered voters/turnout		168	–
Source: Mizzima

=== Military committee ===
Tin Aung Myint Oo was nominated by the committee of military appointed members. He was a member of the Pyithu Hluttaw from the Pobbathiri Township. He had previously been Secretary 1 of the State Peace and Development Council.

The Tatmadaw did not release any information on how he was chosen.

== Results ==
The election was held on 4 February 2011.

Candidate	Party	Votes	%
Thein Sein (elected president)	Union Solidarity and Development Party	408	62.39
Tin Aung Myint Oo (elected first vice-president)	Union Solidarity and Development Party	171	26.15
Sai Mauk Kham (elected second vice-president)	Union Solidarity and Development Party	75	11.47
Total		654	100.00
Registered voters/turnout		659	–
Source: Asia News

Five Pyithu Hluttaw seats were vacant.

The elected candidates were sworn in on 30 March 2011.

== 2012 by-election ==
On 1 July 2012, 1st Vice-President Tin Aung Myint Oo resigned due to his poor health. 2nd Vice-President Sai Mauk Kham then became 1st Vice-President. Because Tin had been nominated by the Tatmadaw appointed members, that committee was entitled to choose his replacement. They nominated then Chief Minister of Yangon Region Myint Swe, a retired lieutenant general. But he did not qualify per the Constitution of Myanmar, as his son-in-law was an Australian citizen at the time. So they elected Admiral Nyan Tun, then Commander-in-Chief of the Myanmar Navy as 2nd Vice-President.
