= Nay Myo Wai =

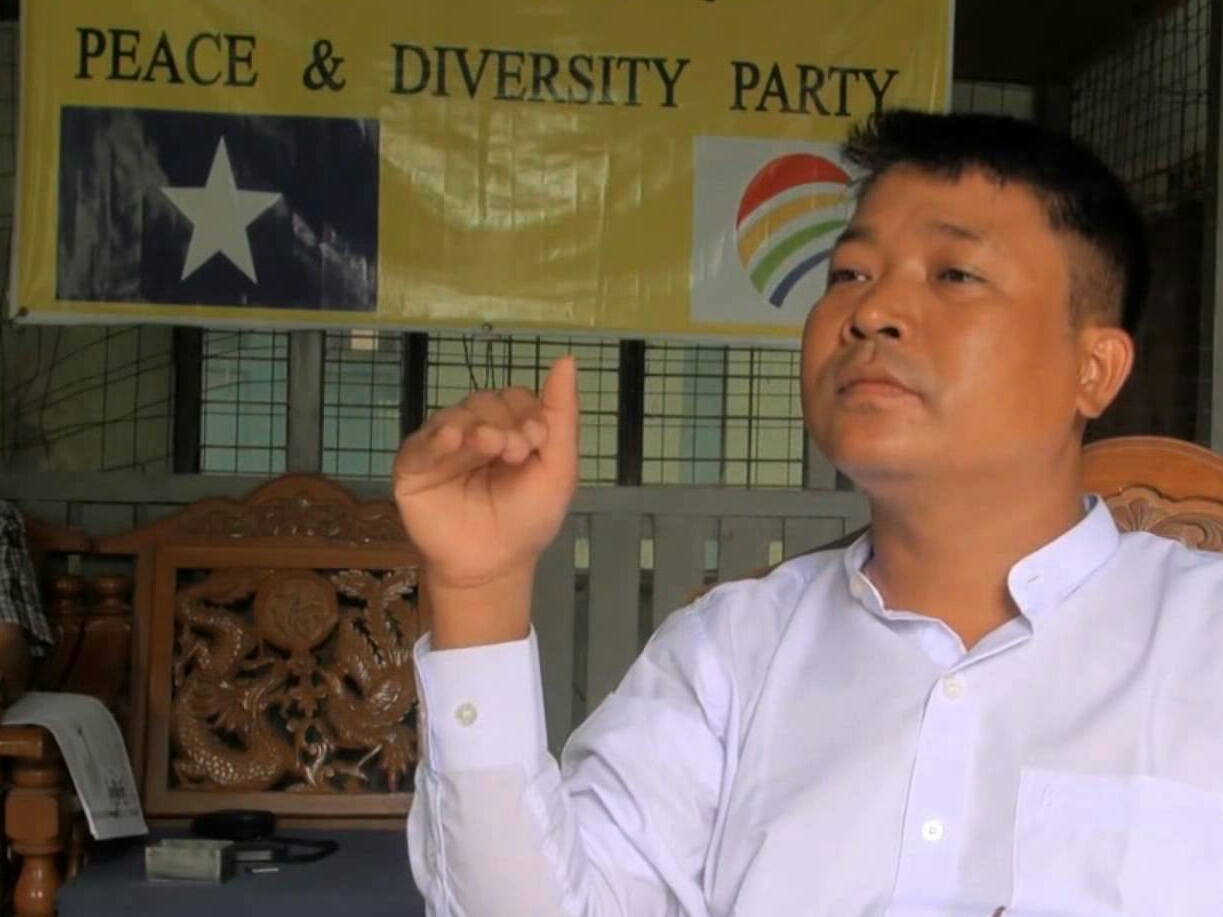
- Born: 22 July 1972 (age 54)
- Education: B.E (Aeronautical)
- Occupation: Politician
- Political party: Peace and Diversity Party
- Father: Hla Myint

Nay Myo Wai (Burmese: နေမျိုးဝေ; born 22 July 1972) is a Burmese nationalist politician and a land activist. He is the chairman of Peace and Diversity Party from Myanmar.

== Political ideology ==
Nay Myo Wai claims that he advocates for a form of nationalism which aims to avoid an ideology based on a particular class, race or religion. and that he supports democracy and a government elected by the people. However, he and his Peace and Diversity Party have espoused Burmese nationalism and anti-Muslim rhetoric as well as throwing support for the ultranationalist Ma Ba Tha movement.

== Political history ==
In his political history, he became foremost activist for farm lands by campaigning vigorously against land confiscations in Myanmar. In his farm land movements, he campaigned against Illegal taking farm lands for industrial zone by economic elite Zaykabar Khin Shwe, a member of parliament for the country's upper house, the Amyotha Hluttaw and relative of General Shwe Mann, Speaker of the Pyithu Hluttaw.

He managed to get back farm lands seized by the Myanmar military but not used by farmers.
