= Athletics at the 2013 SEA Games – Men's marathon =

The men's marathon at the 2013 SEA Games, the athletics was held in Naypyidaw, Myanmar. The track and field events is taking place at the Wunna Theikdi Stadiumon December 16.

== Schedule ==
All times are Myanmar Standard Time (UTC+06:30)

| Date | Time | Event |
|---|---|---|
| Monday, 16 December 2013 | 06:30 | Final |

== Records ==
Prior to this competition, the existing world, Asian, and Southeast Asian Games records were as follows.

| World Record | Wilson Kipsang (KEN) | 2:03:23 | Berlin, Germany | 29 September 2013 |
| Asian Record | Toshinari Takaoka (JPN) | 2:06.16 | Chicago, United States | 13 October 2002 |
| Games Record | Eduardus Nabunome (INA) | 2:20:27 | Jakarta, Indonesia | 19 October 1997 |

== Results ==
| Rank | Athlete | Time | Notes |
|---|---|---|---|
| 1st place, gold medalist(s) | Mok Ying Ren (SIN) | 2:28:36 | |
| 2nd place, silver medalist(s) | Thaung Aye (MYA) | 2:29:50 | |
| 3rd place, bronze medalist(s) | Eric Panique (PHI) | 2:30:30 | |
| 4 | Kuniaki Takizaki (CAM) | 2:32:54 | |
| 5 | Nikolas Albinus Sila (INA) | 2:33:32 | |
| 6 | Soe Naing (MYA) | 2:35:15 | |
| 7 | Yahuza Yahuza (INA) | 2:36:32 | |
| 8 | Liew Wei Yen Ashley (SIN) | 2:42:55 | |
| 9 | Viro Ma (CAM) | 2:44:33 | |
