= Red Link Communications =

RedLink Communications
- Type: Internet service provider
- Founded: 2008; 18 years ago
- Founder: Shane Thu Aung, Min Swe Hlaing, Thein Than Toe
- Headquarters: Yangon, Myanmar
- Area served: Nationwide
- Services: Wire and wireless broadband internet access
- Number of employees: 500+ (FY 2013)
- Website: www.redlink.net.mm

RedLink Communications is a private company headquartered in Yangon, Myanmar. It provides WiMAX broadband internet and other Internet and telecommunications services. Its WiMAX coverage includes areas in Yangon, Mandalay and Bagan Established in 2008, it became the second (after Bagan Cybertech) privately owned Internet service provider in Myanmar.

In December 2010 the company was the first Myanmar ICT/telecom company to get ISO9001:2008 "Quality Management System" certificate, from SGS Myanmar.

== History ==
=== 2008 ===
- RedLink launched WiMax Broadband Wireless & Installation services in Yangon in October.
- It launched WiMax Broadband Services in Mandalay in December 2008.

=== 2009 ===
- Enjoy Web Portal launched and also launched at NetNow Wifi prepaid card in October.

=== 2010 ===
- It signed to build National Long haul IP Digital Microwave Transmission Network Solution Agreement with MPT.
- It provided Wireless access point in Yangon in 2010.
- In October Red Link got ISO Certificate (9001-2008) Awarded for Quality Management System for ICT.

=== 2011 ===
- FTTx (Triple Play Services) launched in Mandalay at March 2011.
- Jointly cooperated with SK Telecom for 802.16e WiMax Network Expansion at June.
- It signed 802.16e WiMAX Expansion Agreement with Yadanarpon Teleport at October.
- It Launched ″WiMAX Service Soft″ in Yangon at December.

=== 2012 ===
- It signed MOU with CAT Telecom, PCCW, NTTCom and SingTel to support the Global Access.
- It launched ″802.16e WiMAX Service Grand″ in Yangon at February 2012.

=== 2013 ===
- It became Official partner with CISCO, Fortinet and Dell at 2013.
- It provided ″WiFi free zones″ in(Yangon and Ngwesaung, one of South East Asia's longest beaches) for the 27th South East Asia Games.

== Owners ==
The company is co-owned by Toe Naing Mann, the advisor to the Speaker of Myanmar's Lower House of Parliament, and sons of Thura Shwe Mann who is Speaker of the Pyithu Hluttaw, the lower house of the Burmese parliament, since 2011. They were persons related to the previous government of Myanmar, their activities in the European Union were restricted and their assets were subject to be frozen.

In July 2013, European Union re-opened its market to Myanmar because of reform-government.

Shareholders and co-founders are Shane Thu Aung, Thein Than Toe, Min Swe Hlaing.

== Business ==
RedLink introduced ″Prepaid internet cards for access to wireless internet at hotspots″ in December 2009.

In 2009, the company announced the expected launch internet radio from the portals enjoy.com.mm and enjoy.net.mm.

In September 2010 Red Link was among six providers allowed to launch high-speed fiber optics internet services in Yangon (Rangoon). The company introduced the service in Yadanabon in March 2010 and in Mandalay in June 2010.

In 27th South East Asia Games, RedLink Communications is provided wireless broadband internet access (WiFi Zones) by cooperating with Cisco Systems Company Ltd.

Other services include web hosting, IP solutions, satellite solutions, VoIP, IPTV, domain name services, for individual and corporate customers.
