= CBOSS (disambiguation) =

CBOSS is an acronym, which may refer to:

- Cellular Biotechnology Operations Support System, a microgravity experiment for cellular biology on the International Space Station delivered by STS-108
- Communications Based Overlay Signal System, a positive train control system being implemented for the Caltrain commuter rail service
- Convergent Business Operation Support System Corporation, a Russia-based telecom company
- DARPA/SPAWAR contract N66001-01-C-8035, which resulted in the development of OpenPAM, a BSD-licensed implementation of PAM
