= Georgia–Myanmar relations =

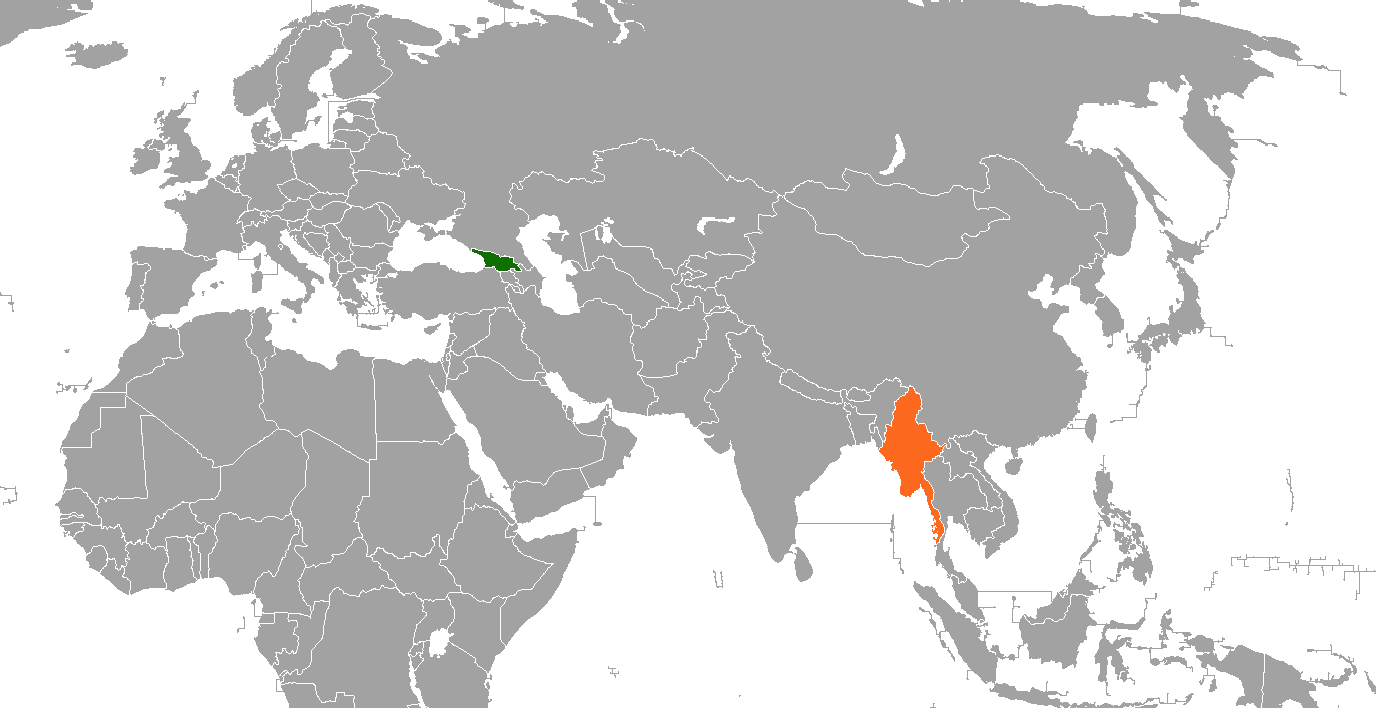
- Georgia: Myanmar

Georgia–Myanmar relations are the bilateral relations between Georgia and Myanmar.

== Relations ==
Diplomatic relations between Georgia and Myanmar were established on 16 August 1999. The ties between both states have been tense ever since Georgia's 2003 Rose Revolution, particularly due to Myanmar's close ties to Russia.

Georgian President Mikheil Saakashvili often cited Myanmar as an example of an authoritarian regime that Georgia sought to be differentiate itself from. In 2005, during U.S. President George W. Bush's visit to Tbilisi, he announced his support for the American attempts to push for democratic reform and end the totalitarian government in the southeastern Asian country. In 2007, during his annual address to the United Nations General Assembly, President Saakashvili called on the international community to support pro-democratic protests in Myanmar:

Today, in this great hall, we have an opportunity to reaffirm one of the core principles of the United Nations: the right of every individual to pursue a life of liberty in dignity; by voicing our support for the hundreds of thousands of monks and ordinary citizens daring to seek freedom for the people of Burma.

We must stand fast with them. It is my deepest hope that we will look back and remember this “Saffron Revolution" of the Burmese monks as another step in the inevitable march of liberty across the planet.

In 2012, when vetoing a bill to release prisoners recognized as "political prisoners" by the Georgian Parliament, President Saakashvili presented a sharp contrast between Georgia's democratic advancement and Myanmar's authoritarian regime.

Meanwhile Myanmar, while formally recognizing the territorial integrity of Georgia, has consistently sided with Russia in the Russo-Georgian conflict. In 2006, it was one of the 15 countries to vote against a UN resolution calling for a renewed debate on the separatist conflicts in Georgia, Azerbaijan, Ukraine, and Moldova. Since 2008, Myanmar has voted every year (except for 2016 when the Myanmar delegation was absent from the General Assembly) against the Georgia-sponsored UN resolution calling for the return of internally displaced persons to Abkhazia and South Ossetia, including in 2013, despite President Saakashvili's attempt to lobby Sai Mauk Kham, Vice-President of Myanmar. Georgian diplomats at the United Nations often use the 2015 Rohingya refugee crisis as a comparison to Georgia's own refugee situation.

Culturally, Georgia and Myanmar have enjoyed limited but cordial relations. Three Georgian movies directed by a family of female directors were screened in 2015 during Yangoon's Memory International Film Festival.

== Diplomatic missions ==
- Georgia is accredited to Myanmar from its embassy in Prague, Czech Republic.
- Myanmar is accredited to Georgia from its embassy in Kuala Lumpur, Malaysia.

== See also ==
- Foreign relations of Georgia
- Foreign relations of Myanmar
