= Aung Thet Mann =

Burmese businessman

- Born: 19 June 1977 (age 49)
- Education: Yangon Institute of Economics
- Occupation: CEO of Ayer Shwe Wah
- Spouse: Khin Hnin Thandar
- Parent(s): Shwe Mann (father); Khin Lay Thet
- Relatives: Toe Naing Mann (brother)

Aung Thet Mann (Burmese: အောင်သက်မန်း, pronounced [àuɰ̃ θɛʔ máɰ̃]; born 19 June 1977), also known as Shwe Mann Ko Ko (ရွှေမန်းကိုကို), is a Burmese businessman and currently CEO of Ayer Shwe Wah, a major Burmese company. Aung Thet Mann's father is Shwe Mann, a former military general and Speaker of the Pyithu Hluttaw. He graduated from the Yangon Institute of Economics. Aung Thet Mann is married to Khin Hnin Thandar.
