= Yadanabon Cyber City =

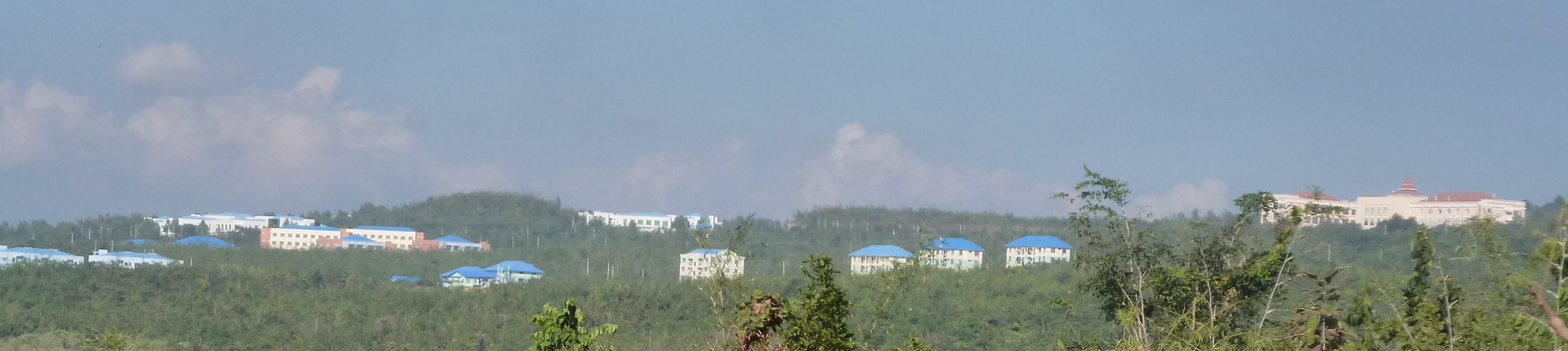
Yatanarpon Cyber City

Yatanarpon Cyber City (Burmese: ရတနာပုံ နည်းပညာ မြို့သစ် [jədənàbòʊɰ̃ nípjɪ̀ɰ̃ɲà mjo̰ðɪʔ]) is the largest information technology center in Myanmar. The 4,050-hectare (10,000-acre) ICT park is located near Pyinoolwin, about 67 km east of Mandalay. Partly operational since December 2007, tenants in the park reportedly include over 30 local and foreign investors, mostly from Asia.

== History ==
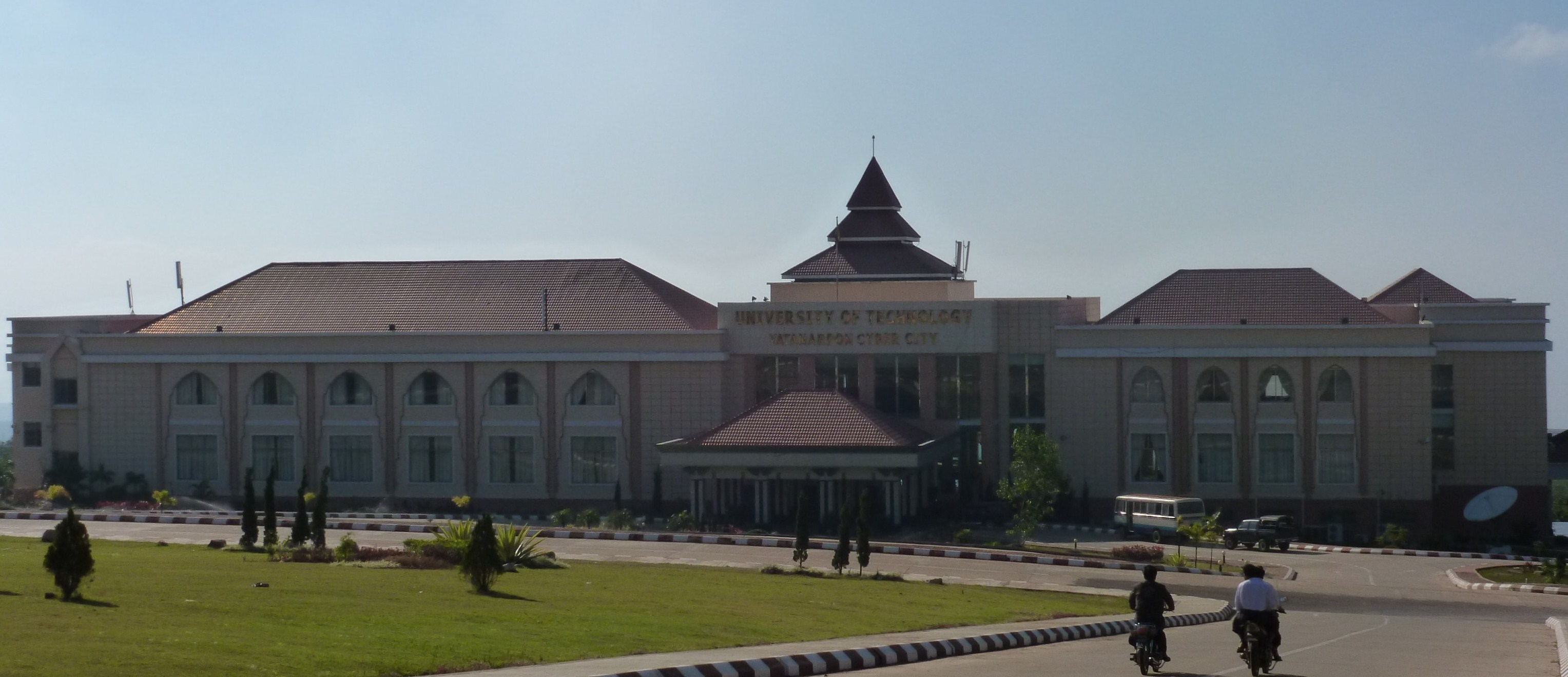
Technology University at Yatanarpon, the main anchor of the technology park

When the ICT park was established in June 2006, the master plan called for simultaneously developing nine "zones"—the teleport building; seven single-story "incubation units"; local and international software zones; a park and convention center zone; a commercial and services zone; a research and development zone; a training centre; and a residential area. To encourage private housing, the government offered land lease grants for 30 years, which could not be sold or transferred in the first ten years.

In June 2008, the military government announced that twelve local and foreign information technology companies had been given permission to invest in the center. The Burmese companies included the semi-government-owned Myanmar Teleport and eight privately owned companies, including FISCA Enterprise, MCC and Fortune International, Htoo Trading, Myanmar World Distribution, Nibban, Tamoenyel Chantha Tun Wai Tha, Yatanarpon Cyber Corporation, Jadeland Myanmar, High-Tech Princess, and Myanmar Info-Tech. Foreign investors reportedly included: Shin Satellite from Thailand; ZTE and Alcatel Shanghai Bell of China; IP Tel Sdn Bhd of Malaysia; and CBOSS of Russia. The 12 companies agreed to invest a total of US $22 million in the Yatanarpon site.

By December 2008, the Burmese government had allotted 150 hectares to 35 local and foreign IT companies.
