= Zay Thiha =

Zay Thiha (Burmese: ဇေသီဟ) is a Burmese business tycoon and vice chairman of Zaykabar Construction one of Myanmar's largest construction company. Zay Thiha is also a Lethwei promoter and the founder and chairman of the World Lethwei Championship, as well as president of the Myanmar Archery Federation, the governing body of archery in Myanmar. He is the eldest son and heir of Khin Shwe, one of Myanmar's richest men and founder of the Zaykabar Company. On March 23, 2021, in the aftermath of the 2021 Myanmar coup d'état, he was arrested and sent to Insein Prison along with his father, following a conflict over a failed building development on military-owned land in Yangon. They are became the first major cronies to be arrested after the coup. He is married to Nandar Hlaing, a popular actress, in 2008, and has three children. On April 12, 2025, Zay Thiha was released from Yangon’s Insein Prison.
