= Thaung Aye =

- သောင်းအေး

Member of the Pyithu Hluttaw
- Incumbent
- Assumed office 1 February 2016
- Preceded by: Myint Soe
- Constituency: Pyawbwe Township
- Majority: 82,382 votes

Chairman of the Shan State Peace and Development Council
- In office 2006–2008

Chairman of Rakhine State Peace and Development Council
- In office 2008–2010

Personal details
- Born: December 1, 1956 (age 69) Kana Village, Bago Division
- Party: Union Solidarity and Development Party
- Spouse: Thin Myo Aung Aung
- Parent(s): Wine (father); Than (mother)
- Education: Defence Services Academy in 1975; Yangon University in 1974
- Occupation: Politician

Thaung Aye (born December 1, 1956) is a Burmese politician and former military officer who currently serves as a Pyithu Hluttaw MP for Pyawbwe Township.

== Early life and education ==
Thaung Aye was born on 1 December 1956 in the village of Kana, in Pegu Division's Kawa Township to Wine and Than. He graduated from Rangoon University in 1974 and Defence Services Academy in 1975.

== Political career ==
He served as Chairman of the Shan State Peace and Development Council from 2006 to 2008 and as Chairman of the Rakhine State Peace and Development Council from 2008 to 2010.

In the 2015 Myanmar general election, he contested the Pyithu Hluttaw from Pyawbwe Township parliamentary constituency, winning a majority of 82,382 votes.

On March 21, 2018, Pyithu Hluttaw Speaker Win Myint resigned. Thaung Aye and T Khun Myat (Kutkai constituency) were nominated for the new chairman. But, T Khun Myat was elected as the new Chairman of Pyithu Hluttaw with the highest votes. In October 2022, he was appointed as the Union Solidarity and Development Party's party general.
