= Win Myint =

President of Myanmar from 2018 to 2021

U Win Myint
- ဝင်းမြင့်
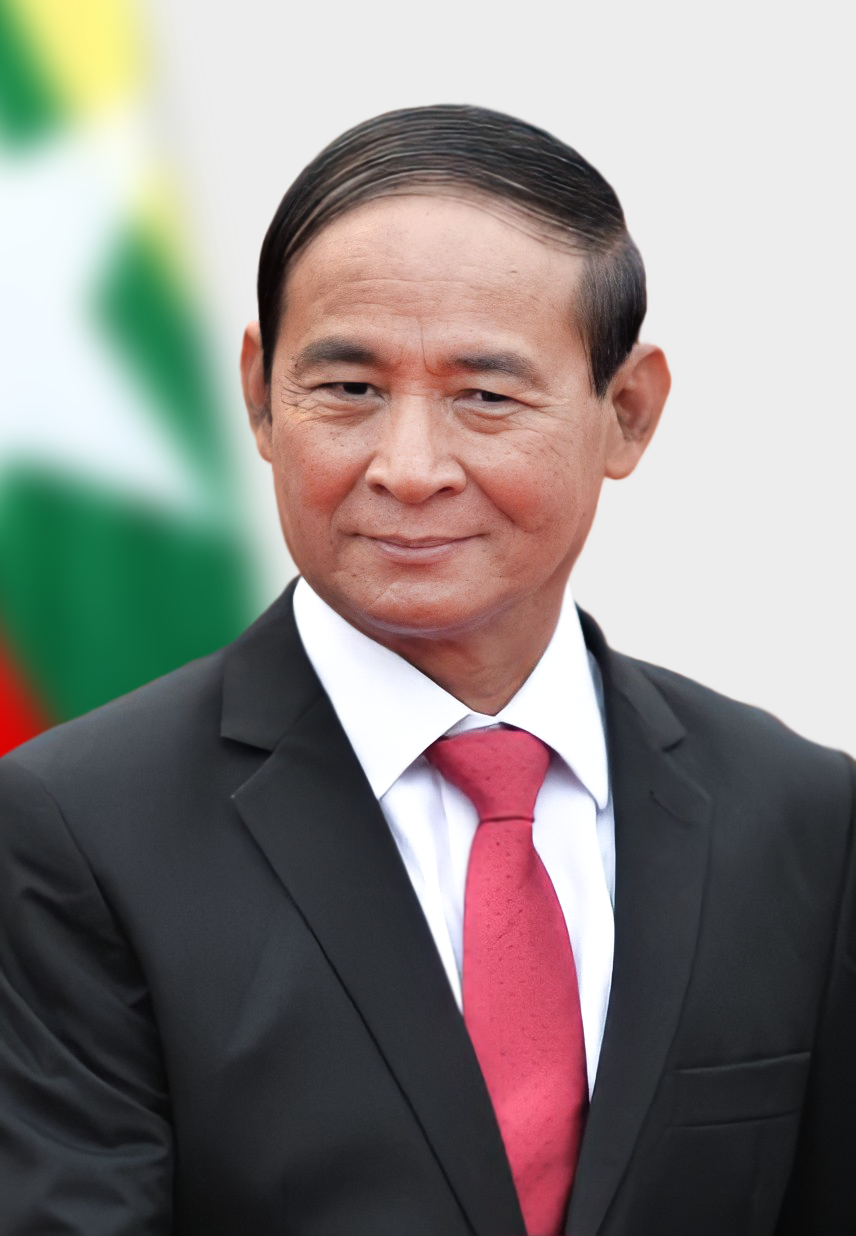
- Win Myint in 2020 (Note: Background of diplomatic photograph digitally replaced with stock flag imagery)

10th President of Myanmar
- In office 30 March 2018 – 1 February 2021
- State Counsellor: Aung San Suu Kyi
- Vice President: First Vice President; Myint Swe; Second Vice President; Henry Van Thio
- Preceded by: Htin Kyaw (Note: Myint Swe served as acting president between Htin Kyaw's resignation and Win Myint's inauguration.)
- Succeeded by: Min Aung Hlaing (Note: Myint Swe served as acting president between Win Myint's deposition in the 2021 coup d'état and the installation of Min Aung Hlaing as acting president following Myint Swe's death in 2025.)

2nd Speaker of the Pyithu Hluttaw
- In office 1 February 2016 – 21 March 2018
- Deputy: T Khun Myat
- Preceded by: Shwe Mann
- Succeeded by: T Khun Myat

Member of the Pyithu Hluttaw
- In office 1 February 2016 – 23 March 2018
- Preceded by: Lei Lei Win Swe
- Constituency: Tamwe Township
- In office 2 May 2012 – 29 January 2016
- Preceded by: Than Tun
- Succeeded by: Wai Hlaing Tun
- Constituency: Pathein Township

Member-elect of Pyithu Hluttaw (1990)
- Preceded by: Constituency established
- Succeeded by: Constituency abolished
- Constituency: Danubyu Township № 1
- Majority: 20,388 (56%)

Personal details
- Born: 8 November 1951 (age 74) Nyaung Chaung Village, Danubyu, Union of Burma
- Party: National League for Democracy
- Spouse: Cho Cho
- Children: 1
- Education: University of Yangon

Win Myint (Note: Burmese: ဝင်းမြင့်, MLCTS: wang: mrang. [wɪ́ɰ̃ mjɪ̰ɰ̃]) (born 8 November 1951), commonly known as U Win Myint, is a Burmese politician and diplomat who served as the tenth president of Myanmar from 2018 to 2021, when he was removed from office in the 2021 coup d'état. He was the speaker of the House of Representatives from 2016 to 2018. He also served as a member of parliament in the House of Representatives (Pyithu Hluttaw) from 2012 to 2018. Win Myint was viewed as an important ally of State Counsellor Aung San Suu Kyi. He spent five years in prison after his arrest in the coup, until being pardoned by coup leader Min Aung Hlaing in 2026.

== Early life and education ==
Win Myint was born in Nyaung Chaung Village, Danubyu, Ayeyarwady Region, then part of the Union of Burma, to parents Tun Kyin and Daw Than. He graduated with a Bachelor of Science degree in geology from the Rangoon Arts and Science University. Win Myint is married to Cho Cho and the couple has one daughter, Phyu Phyu Thin, a senior advisor of City Mart Holdings.

== Political career ==
=== 1988 uprising and 1990 election ===
After graduating in geology from Rangoon Arts and Science University, Win Myint became a High Court senior lawyer in 1981 and later a lawyer of the Supreme Court of Myanmar. In 1985, he became a High Court advocate. He was jailed for his role in the 8888 Uprising, and has been described by some who have met him as rather a closed book.

Out of jail in time for the 1990 Myanmar general election, which the military later nullified, he ran successfully for Ayeyarwady Region’s Danubyu Township, winning a majority of 20,388 (56% of the votes), but was never allowed to assume his seat.

=== 2012 by-election and 2015 election ===
Win Myint resumed his political career in the 2012 Myanmar by-elections, winning a Pyithu Hluttaw (lower house) seat in Pathein constituency, and going on to become secretary of parliament’s rule of law committee. In the 2015 Myanmar general election, he was elected as Pyithu Hluttaw MP for Tamwe Township. He served as the Speaker of the House of Representatives of Myanmar from 2016 to 2018.

== Presidency ==
Following the resignation of Htin Kyaw as President of Myanmar, Win Myint resigned as Speaker of the Pyithu Hluttaw on 21 March 2018, a move seen by many as a preparation by the National League for Democracy for Win Myint to be put forward as a candidate for the presidency. Win Myint was succeeded by his deputy T Khun Myat. The Pyithu Hluttaw confirmed the election of Win Myint as the House of Representatives' nominee for Vice-President on 23 March 2018, paving the way for Win Myint to enter the election process for the next President of Myanmar. Win Myint received 273 votes to defeat Union Solidarity and Development Party's candidate Thaung Aye, who received 27. Win Myint was elected as the 10th President of Myanmar by the Pyidaungsu Hluttaw (a combined meeting of the two houses of the national legislature) on 28 March 2018, with 403 out of 636 lawmakers voting for him.

On 17 April 2018, Win Myint granted amnesty to 8,500 prisoners, including 51 foreigners and 36 political prisoners.

== 2021 coup d'état ==
On 1 February 2021, during a military coup d'état, Win Myint was detained along with fellow parliament members including the State Counsellor and party leader, Aung San Suu Kyi, in Naypyidaw. Win Myint was removed from office and replaced by Vice-President Myint Swe as acting head of state.

Later on 4 February 2021, Win Myint was charged for violating rules banning gatherings during the COVID-19 pandemic. Trial hearings commenced on 16 February. On 11 October, a Naypyidaw judge formally indicted Win Myint under Section 25 of the Disaster Management Law, which carries a maximum three-year prison sentence. During Win Myint's testimony on 12 October, he revealed that on 1 February in the lead-up to the coup, two senior military generals had attempted to force him to resign, under the guise of "ill health."

On 6 December 2021, Win Myint and Suu Kyi were both sentenced to four years in jail.

Win Myint has been continuously designated as the president of Myanmar by the opposition National Unity Government (NUG), but has never voiced support for the NUG and has not been able to participate in it due to his incarceration. Even after his release in 2026, it is unclear whether he supports the NUG or approves of its unilateral naming of him as its president.

On 16 April 2024, the military announced that Win Myint had been transferred to house arrest due to a heat wave. However, pro-democracy publications such as The Irrawaddy claimed that there is little evidence to support the junta's announcement.

On 17 April 2026, he was released after being pardoned by Min Aung Hlaing during Thingyan.

== Notes ==
Political offices
Preceded by Htin Kyaw	President of Myanmar; 2018–2021	Succeeded by Min Aung Hlaing
