= Shwe Mann =

Burmese general and politician

Thura Shwe Mann
- သူရရွှေမန်း
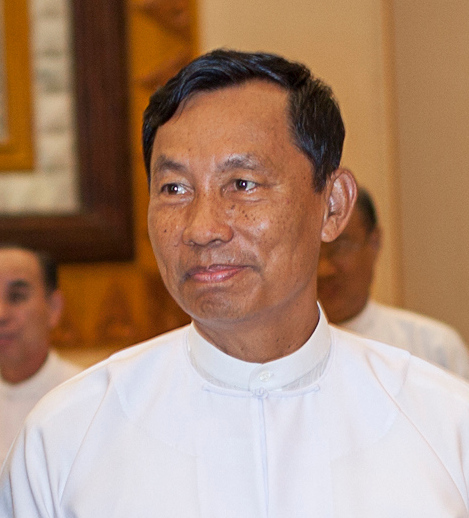
- Shwe Mann in 2012

2nd Speaker of the Pyidaungsu Hluttaw
- In office 1 July 2013 – 29 January 2016
- Deputy: Nanda Kyaw Swa
- Preceded by: Khin Aung Myint
- Succeeded by: Mahn Win Khaing Than

1st Speaker of the Pyithu Hluttaw
- In office 31 January 2011 – 29 January 2016
- President: Thein Sein
- Deputy: Nanda Kyaw Swa
- Preceded by: Position established
- Succeeded by: Win Myint

Member of the Pyithu Hluttaw from Zeyarthiri
- In office 31 January 2011 – 29 January 2016
- Preceded by: Constituency established
- Succeeded by: Hla Htay Win

Chairman of the Legal Affairs and Special Cases Assessment Commission of the Pyidaungsu Hluttaw
- Incumbent
- Assumed office 5 February 2016
- Preceded by: Commission established

Personal details
- Born: 11 July 1947 (age 79) Kanyutkwin, Burma
- Party: Union Solidarity and Development Party (2008–2016); Union Betterment Party (2019–2022)
- Spouse: Khin Lay Thet
- Children: Aung Thet Mann; Toe Naing Mann
- Education: Defence Services Academy

Military service
- Allegiance: Myanmar
- Branch/service: Myanmar Army
- Years of service: 1969–2010
- Rank: General

Thura Shwe Mann (Burmese: သူရ ရွှေမန်း, pronounced [θùja̰ ʃwè máɰ̃]; born 11 July 1947) is a Burmese politician who was Speaker of the Pyithu Hluttaw, the lower house of parliament from 31 January 2011 to 29 January 2016. He is a former army general and, whilst being a protégé of senior general Than Shwe, was considered the third most powerful man in the State Peace and Development Council (SPDC), which ruled Myanmar until 2011. He was the first to be appointed as Chief of the General Staff (Army, Navy and Air), the third highest military appointment in Myanmar, in 2001.

He was elected to parliament in the 2010 general election. He was later selected as Speaker of the lower House at the first regular session of the Pyithu Hluttaw in 2011. He was crucial in the newly found activism of the Lower House vis-à-vis the Upper House and the executive.

In May 2013, he replaced President Thein Sein as head of the ruling Union Solidarity and Development Party (USDP). That same year, he confirmed he would run for president in 2015. Amidst reports of tensions between Shwe Mann and Thein Sein, the former was removed from his post as head of the USDP in August 2015. Finally he was sacked from USDP together with other 17 senior members in April 2016. He later founded the Union Betterment Party (UBP), which existed from 2019 to 2022.

== Military career ==
Shwe Mann graduated from the Defence Services Academy, Intake 11, Pyin Oo Lwin in 1969. He quickly rose through the ranks, and became major in 1986.

He served as a Regiment Commander in Karen State and earned the honorific title Thura (brave hero) for his military campaign against the Karen National Liberation Army in 1988. The campaign led to the eventual capture of the Karen National Union (KNU)’s headquarters in the Methawaw Area. He served as a tactical operations commander for Light Infantry Division (LID) 66 based in Prome from 1993 to 1995. His achievements in the Karen state in 1994 meant that he was promoted to the rank of brigadier general. He was commander of the elite LID 11 based in Inn Daing, near Yangon in 1996. In November 1997, he was promoted to the rank of major general and became a permanent member of the State Peace and Development Council (SPDC). That same year, he became commander of South-west Command in Pathein, Ayeyarwady Division. He concurrently served as the chairman of the Ayeyarwady Peace and Development Council.

In line with the SPDC’s developmental rhetoric, he supported a number of initiatives aimed at increasing agricultural productivity and food security. These included supporting seasonal crop rotation, and converting more than 1 million acres of low, dry and wetlands into cultivated land. This was possible thanks to improvements in water channelisation and river banks. 500,000 acres of intensive and extensive fishery farms were also created. He was promoted to Chief of the General Staff (Army, Navy and Air) in 2001. That same year, he was promoted to the rank of lieutenant general. As a key figure in the SPDC, he seems to have overseen a number of offensives against ethnic insurgents. This claim has been raised specifically in relation to the 2006 offensive against the Karen National Liberation Army (KNLA).

In September 2010, he retired from the army. Following his retirement, Shwe Mann became a candidate for the newly created Union Solidarity and Development Party (USDP). He was selected as a representative for Zay Yar Thiri constituency in the 2010 general election.

=== Relationship with Than Shwe ===
Shwe Mann has had a close relationship to former dictator General Than Shwe. When Than Shwe became commander-in-chief of the Tatmadaw in 1992, he made Shwe Mann one of his deputies. Although Than Shwe frequently shook up the ranks, firing ministers and military officials, Shwe Mann was allowed to rise through the ranks and become the third most powerful figure in the country.

It has been alleged that Than Shwe feared Shwe Mann’s comeuppance, and decided to balance his aspirations and power by choosing Thein Sein for the position of president and Tin Aung Myint Oo as vice-president.

=== Relationship with other senior officials ===
Shwe Mann played a key role in the ousting of Prime Minister Khin Nyunt in 2004. After Khin Nyunt’s arrest, Shwe Mann famously said that “Nobody is above the law.”

He was seen as the most likely successor to General Maung Aye, who was Deputy Commander-in-Chief of the Armed Forces. Allegedly, Shwe Mann and Maung Aye were political rivals.

Shwe Mann was also an alleged rival to first vice-president Tin Aung Myint Oo.

It is believed that he has the loyalty of General Min Aung Hlaing, the commander-in-chief of the Armed Forces.

== Allegations of human rights abuses ==
A leaked U.S. cable stated that “[l]ike most Burmese field commanders, Shwe Mann utilized forced civilian porters, including women and children, on a massive scale during operations against Karen insurgents.”

It has also been alleged that Shwe Mann was directly involved in the Depayin massacre, which saw the death of at least 70 people associated to the National League for Democracy (NLD). According to some sources, Gen Than Shwe ordered lower-ranking officers to carry out the attack on Aung San Suu Kyi’s convoy at Tabayin in March 2003. Than Shwe bypassed his deputy Maung Aye and Prime Minister Khin Nyunt, leaving Shwe Mann directly responsible for the military preparation of the attack.

He was also allegedly involved in repression of the Saffron Revolution. According to another 2007 U.S. diplomatic cable, “by all accounts he willingly participated in the brutal repression of September’s pro-democracy protests.”

== Political career ==
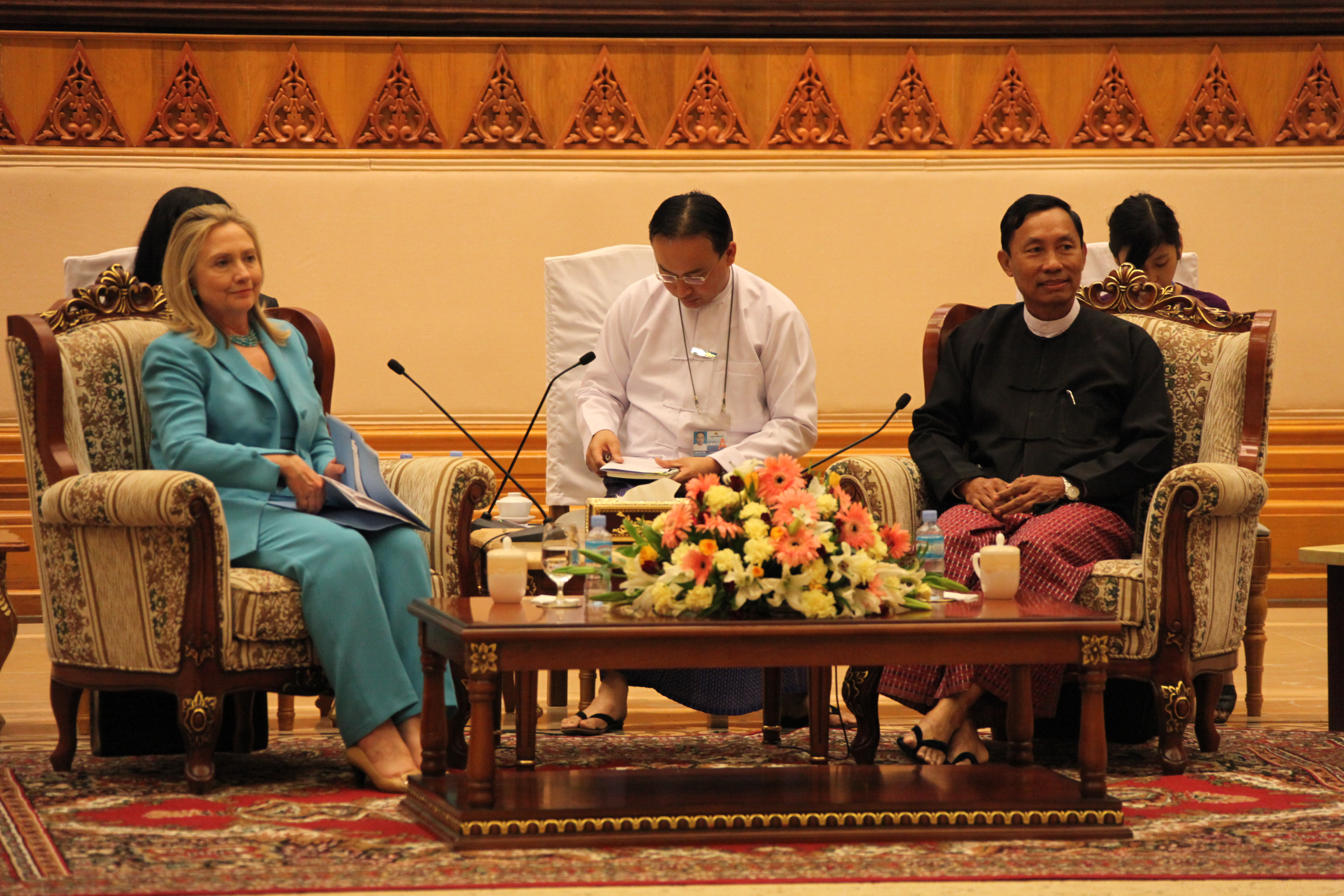
Hillary Clinton meeting with Shwe Mann at Lower House

He was elected Speaker of the Lower House at the first regular session of the Pyithu Hluttaw in 2011. From 1 July 2013 to 29 January 2016 he became Speaker of the Pyidaungsu Hluttaw.

In August 2015, amidst reports of tensions between himself and Thein Sein, Shwe Mann was removed from his post as Chairman of the Union Solidarity and Development Party and replaced by Htay Oo. But he contested in 2015 General Election as a candidate representing USDP in Phyu Township constituency. He lost his seat to Than Nyunt, NLD's candidate, but remained as a prominent figure and closed ally to Aung San Suu Kyi. He was appointed in February 2015 as head of the Commission for the Assessment of Legal Affairs and Special Issues.

=== Reform process ===
Shwe Mann has claimed that “reforms are irreversible” and their goal is “to build a multi-party democratic system and a market economy.” He has been called “a defender of the president [Thein Sein]’s reforms.” Although political reforms have moved apace, he also believes that socio-economic development and administrative reforms are lagging behind.

He has been seen as a staunch critic of corrupt practices amongst public officials. He had reportedly ordered action against corrupt authorities as far back as 2005. He criticised the government’s lack of transparency and accountability over public funds. He has firmly supported liberal reforms and the turn towards a market economy in Myanmar. He has been critical of Thein Sein’s “sluggish” approach to liberalisation, and has taken a strong stance against corrupt practices in the interest of “good governance.”

In regards to the 25 per cent of parliamentary seats allocated to the Tatmadaw, he has expressed hope that the Constitution will change before the elections to accommodate a more representative political outcome.

=== Democracy ===
Shwe Mann has argued that democracy must be seen “as a vehicle for progress.” In an interview, he stated that “the biggest challenge is changing the [old] mind-set and attitude. If people do not understand the essence of democracy, there will be more disadvantages than advantages.”

He has been praised for reaching out to political activist groups, including the 88 Generation Students Group. He has often remarked on the importance of upholding the 2008 Constitution.

=== Relationship with opposition leader Aung San Suu Kyi ===
Despite their opposite political standpoints, the relationship between Shwe Mann and Aung San Suu Kyi has been defined as “excellent.” Others have defined it as “a working relationship, albeit perhaps one of convenience.” They have maintained an open stance on a possible future alliance.

=== Ethnic politics ===
He has referred to the Rohingya crisis as a sensitive issue that requires immediate attention. However, he has also stressed that the problem has been on-going for at least the last 100 years. In his conference at the Carnegie Endowment for International Peace, he pointed out that the ongoing violence in Rakhine State is not only between religious groups, but also between mobs.

Shwe Mann has assumed a liberal-conservative position on federalism. He has claimed he would rather see an evolution of the federal system rather than its revolution.

=== Education ===
Shwe Mann has spoken about the need to strengthen the current education system in Myanmar. He has argued that Myanmar education is “not in line with what [is] need today.” He has also spoken in favour of a National Educational Bill to improve basic and secondary education, including universities and vocational schools.

== Stance on the international community ==
Shwe Mann has made it known that the country’s future development depends on the “economic cooperation [between] the private sector and the international community.” Speaking at The Asian Foundation, he praised the non-profit sector and NGOs, who work “not for an individual country but for the international community.”

=== Relationship with the U.S. ===
Shwe Mann has been seen as a key figure in the ongoing diplomatic effort to recalibrating Washington’s foreign policy towards Asia, known as "pivot." Indeed, the U.S. president sought his company during his first official visit to Myanmar.

Jim Della-Giacoma, Southeast Asia analyst for the International Crisis Group (ICG), argued that the U.S. had made a common cause with Shwe Mann to "bringing the national parliament to life as a legitimate democratic institution."

Shwe Mann has argued in favour of increased U.S. investment and technical support in Myanmar.

=== Relationship with China ===
Shwe Mann visited China before his 2015 official visit to the U.S. He has stressed that Myanmar and China are good neighbours and entertain friendly diplomatic relations. At the same time, he has called for greater transparency and accountability on Chinese investments.

=== ASEAN ===
Shwe Mann has emphasised the need to integrate Myanmar into the global economy. "In the globalised economy, no country or region can stand alone. The development of one region depends on integration with other regions in the world," he stated in an official press release.

He has therefore praised the potential of the ASEAN Economic Community as an “asset” to the economies of ASEAN nations and as a dialogue partner for the rest of the world.

=== India and North Korea ===
Whilst still in the military, Shwe Mann travelled to India and North Korea to sign military cooperation agreements with the two countries.

In the 2000s, he tried to forge closer ties with India, which he visited to appeal for more armaments in 2006. In November 2008, Shwe Mann travelled to North Korea and signed a memorandum of understanding on military cooperation. In an interview, he said that the Burmese counterpart "studied their air defence system, weapons factories, aircrafts [sic] and ships."

== Personal life ==
Shwe Mann, a Burmese Buddhist, was born on 11 July 1947 in Kanyuntkwin, Bago Division, to father Pho Phay, and mother Htay Yi. He is married to Khin Lay Thet, a former high school teacher. In a 2007-dated U.S. cable, she was recorded as a member of the Panel of Patrons and one of four vice presidents of the Myanmar Women’s Affairs Federation. They have two sons, Toe Naing Mann and Aung Thet Mann.

He was placed in the U.S. and EU sanction lists (Embassy Rangoon 2007; Martin 2012). He was removed from the U.S. sanction list in September 2012 because, in the words of Under Secretary David S. Cohen, he has "taken concrete steps to promote political reforms and human rights, and to move Burma away from repression and dictatorship toward democracy and freedom".

== Business ties (and corruption allegations) ==
It has been alleged that his sons have used their father’s political clout to advance their business interests.

=== Aung Thet Mann ===
Aung Thet Mann is the chief executive officer at Ayer Shwe Wah, which became the first private company allowed to export rice to Bangladesh and Singapore in 2005. The company is part of Burmese tycoon Tay Za’s Htoo Group of Companies.

When Shwe Mann was Regional Commander in the Ayeyarwady Division, Ayer Shwe Wah received lucrative government contracts to supply fertilizers to farmers throughout the delta. The company also received 30,000 acres of land for development under the government’s Lowland Development Program. These have since been returned with all dues and taxes paid for.

Ayer Shwe Wah has also been involved in construction projects in Naypyidaw.

=== Toe Naing Mann ===
Toe Naing Mann is the founder of Red Link Communications, a major Burmese telecommunications group. In 2004, Toe Naing Mann married Zay Zin Latt, daughter of Khin Shwe, who is the president of Zaygabar Co. Ltd. and a leading Rangoon real estate mogul. Among its businesses, Zaygabar operates the Karaweik Restaurant, a structure on Kandawgyi Lake, and handles Kandawgyi People Park’s operations.

In October 2007, the U.S. Treasury placed Khin Shwe and Zaygabar on its list of individuals and business targeted for sanctions.
