= T Khun Myat =

Burmese politician (born 1949)

His Excellency; Thiri Pyanchi; T Khun Myat
- တီခွန်မြတ်

4th Speaker of the Assembly of the Union
- In office 1 August 2018 – 20 March 2026
- Deputy: Tun Tun Hein
- Preceded by: Mahn Win Khine Than
- Succeeded by: Aung Lin Dwe

3rd Speaker of the House of Representatives
- In office 22 March 2018 – 16 March 2026
- Deputy: Tun Tun Hein
- Preceded by: Win Myint
- Succeeded by: Khin Yi

2nd Deputy Speaker of the House of Representatives
- In office 1 February 2016 – 22 March 2018
- Speaker: Win Myint
- Preceded by: Nanda Kyaw Swa
- Succeeded by: Tun Tun Hein

Member of the House of Representatives for Kutkai District
- In office 31 January 2011 – 31 January 2021
- Preceded by: Constituency established

Leader of People’s Militia Forces in Kutkai Township
- In office 1990–2010

Director of Office of the Attorney General
- In office 1990–2010

Personal details
- Born: Tang Bao Khun Myat; 30 October 1949 (age 76)
- Party: Independent (2016–present); USDP (2010–2016)
- Spouse: Yin May
- Parents: T Khun Gaung; Phaw Jan Htu
- Occupation: Lawyer; civil servant; militia leader; politician

Tang Bao Khun Myat (Burmese: တီခွန်မြတ် [tiː kʰʊ̀ɴ mjaʔ]; born 30 October 1949), known as T Khun Myat is a Burmese politician, lawyer and civil servant of Kachin heritage. He is the Speaker of the Assembly of Union; the bicameral joint parliament of Myanmar since 1 August 2018 and Speaker of the House of Representatives; the lower house of the Assembly of the Union since 22 March 2018. In both 2010 election and 2015 election, he contested and won the Kutkai Township constituency for a seat in the country's lower house.

After the February 2021 coup by the military, according to Article (424) of the Constitution and Article (17) of the Pyithu Hluttaw Law, T Khun Myat continues to serve as the Speaker of Assembly of the Union and Speaker of the House of Representatives.

== Background ==
T Khun Myat is an ethnic Kachin and a descendant of a prominent Kachin traditional ruling Duwa family, the "T" at the beginning of his name comes from his family clan name Tangbau. He is a Christian.

== Career ==
T Khun Myat served as the legal director at the Office of the Attorney General as well as the leader of People's Militia Forces in Kutkai Township under the control of Burmese Army between 1990 and 2010. He was involved in the commission drafting the constitution in 2007 and the commission of 2008 Myanmar constitutional referendum. He also served as the executive member of Union Solidarity and Development Party for northern Shan State.

He was elected as a member of the Pyithu Hluttaw in the 2010 general elections for the Shan State constituency of Kutkai.

He was also chair of the Committee on Bills in the Lower House (2011–16), a body tasked with drafting new legislation and amending or repealing laws considered out of date.

Along with the other allies of Shwe Mann, T Khun Myatt was sacked from the Union Solidarity and Development Party.

Following the resignation of Win Myint as speaker of the House of Representatives, T Khun Myatt was elected by the Pyithu Hluttaw as the next speaker. He was sworn in on 22 March 2018. Although many state- and union-level politicians, including Aung San Suu Kyi and Win Myint, were placed under house arrest during the 2021 Myanmar coup d'état on 1 February, T Khun Myat remained in his office under the Constitution of Myanmar. He attended the meeting of National Defence and Security Council which was hold on 31 January 2022. That meeting extended the State of Emergency to next (6) months.

In January 2023, T Khun Myat was awarded the civilian title of Thiri Pyanchi by the military junta.

== Drug controversy ==
T Khun Myat was the former leader of a militia in Kutkai Township and accused of involvement in illicit drug trade and money laundering. He had been a shareholder in the now-defunct Myanmar May Flower Bank, which was abolished due to money laundering in the illicit drugs industry. He has denied any accusation of his involvement in the drug trade.
