= Toe Naing Mann =

Burmese businessman

- Born: 29 June 1978 (age 48)
- Education: Defence Services Academy
- Spouse: Zay Zin Latt
- Parent(s): Shwe Mann (father); Khin Lay Thet
- Relatives: Aung Thet Mann (brother)

Toe Naing Mann (Burmese: တိုးနိုင်မန်း, pronounced [tó nàiɰ̃ máɰ̃]; born 29 June 1978) is a Burmese businessman and founder of Red Link Communications, a major Burmese telecommunications group. Toe Naing Mann's father is Shwe Mann, a former military general and Speaker of the Pyithu Hluttaw. He has a Ph.D in geology. Toe Naing Mann is a key advisor for the Pyidaungsu Hluttaw's Commission for the Assessment of Legal Affairs and Special Issues.

Toe Naing Mann is married to Zay Zin Latt, the daughter of Khin Shwe, a business tycoon who owns Zaykabar Company. Cherry FM radio station, owned by Zay Zin Latt, was pressured to suspend its operation after her father in law Shwe Mann was purged from USDP Chairman post in August 2015.
