= Nyan Tun =

Burmese politician and general

His Excellency Thray Sithu Nyan Tun
- ဉာဏ်ထွန်း
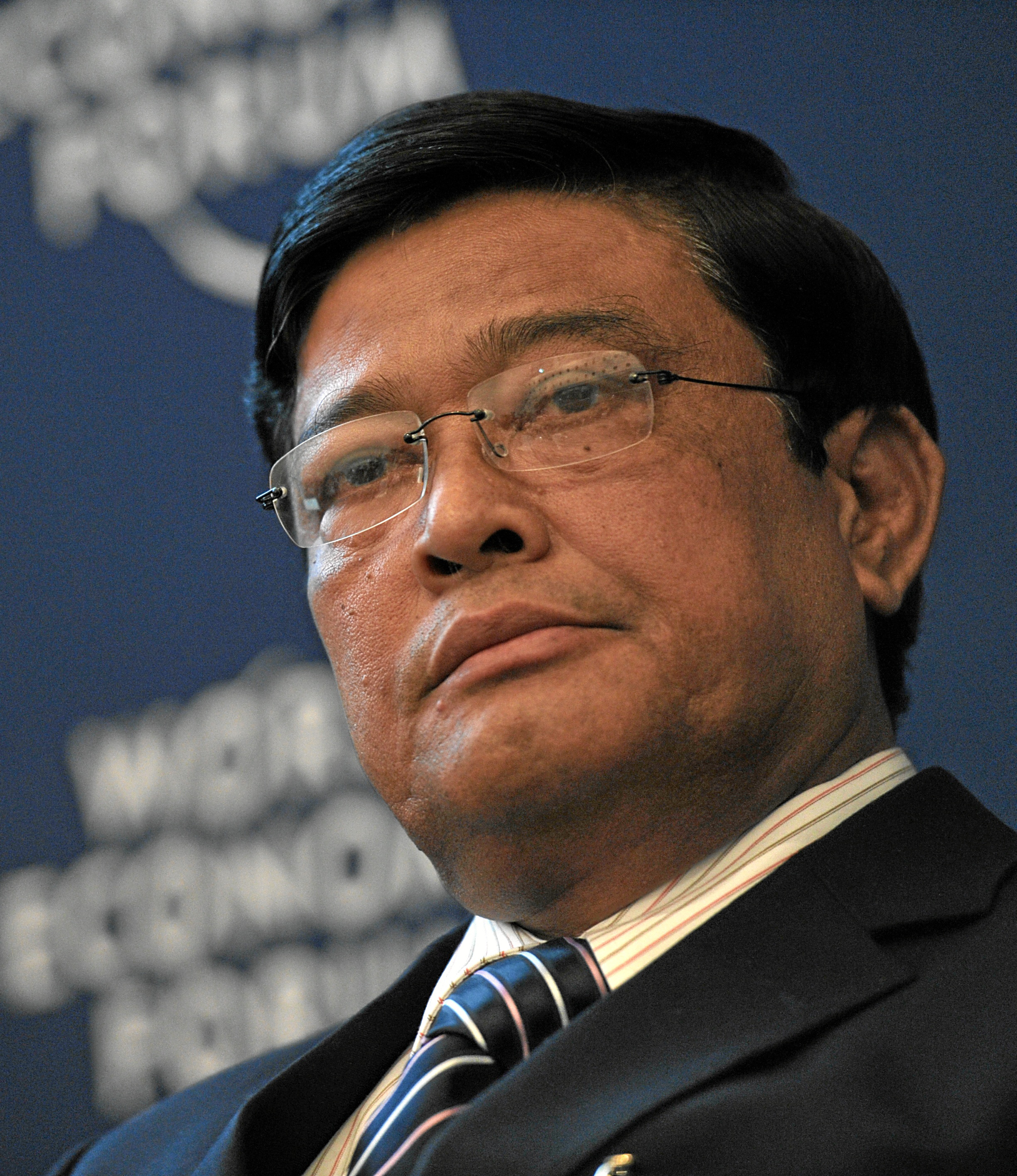
- Nyan Tun in 2013

Member of the Pyithu Hluttaw
- Incumbent
- Assumed office 31 March 2016
- Constituency: Zigon Township

2nd Second Vice President of Myanmar
- In office 15 August 2012 – 30 March 2016 Serving with Sai Mauk Kham
- President: Thein Sein
- Preceded by: Sai Mauk Kham
- Succeeded by: Henry Van Thio

Personal details
- Born: 12 January 1954 (age 72) Zigon Township, Myanmar
- Party: Union Solidarity and Development Party
- Spouse: Khin Aye Myint
- Children: 3
- Parent(s): Sein Maung (father); Thein Tin (mother)
- Education: Defence Services Academy
- Occupation: Politician

Military service
- Allegiance: Myanmar
- Branch/service: Myanmar Navy
- Years of service: 1975–2012
- Rank: Admiral

Thray Sithu Nyan Tun (Burmese: ဉာဏ်ထွန်း; born 12 January 1954) is a Burmese politician who served as a member of parliament in the House of Representatives for Zigon Township constituency from 31 March 2016 to 30 January 2021. He previously served as Second Vice President of Myanmar from 15 August 2012 to 30 March 2016. Previously, he was the commander-in-chief of the Myanmar Navy with the rank of admiral, retired in 2012. He was elected as Second Vice President of Myanmar on 15 August 2012 following the resignation of Tin Aung Myint Oo.

== Early life ==
Nyan was born on 12 January 1954 in Zigon Township, Bago Region, Myanmar to Sein Maung and his wife, Thein Tin.

== Military career ==
Nyan graduated from the 16th intake of the Defence Services Academy in 1975 and served as commander-in-chief of the Navy from June 2008. He was promoted to vice admiral in 2010 and made an admiral in 2012. He was awarded the title of Thray Sithu on 4 January 2012.

As commander-in-chief of the navy, Nyan Tun oversaw a naval standoff with Bangladesh, the mending of Burmese-Bangladesh bilateral relations, the expansion of military relations with India and the modernization of the Burmese Navy, including the acquirement of two frigates from China.

== Political career ==
Nyan Tun was elected as 2nd Second Vice President on 15 August 2012 following the resignation of Tin Aung Myint Oo, and term end on 30 March 2016.

In the 2015 Myanmar general election, he contested the Zigon Township constituency and won a Pyithu Hluttaw seat.

Political offices
Preceded by Sai Mauk Kham	Second Vice President of Myanmar; 2012–2016	Succeeded by Henry Van Thio
