= Peace and Diversity Party =

Peace and Diversity Party မတူကွဲပြားခြင်းနှင့် ငြိမ်းချမ်းရေးပါတီ
- Chairman: Nay Myo Wai
- Founded: 1 June 2010
- Headquarters: No. 2/2/232, Mahawgani Road, Htauk Kyant, Mingaladon Township, Yangon
- Ideology: Ultranationalism
- Seats in the Amyotha Hluttaw: 0 / 224
- Seats in the Pyithu Hluttaw: 0 / 440

Party flag
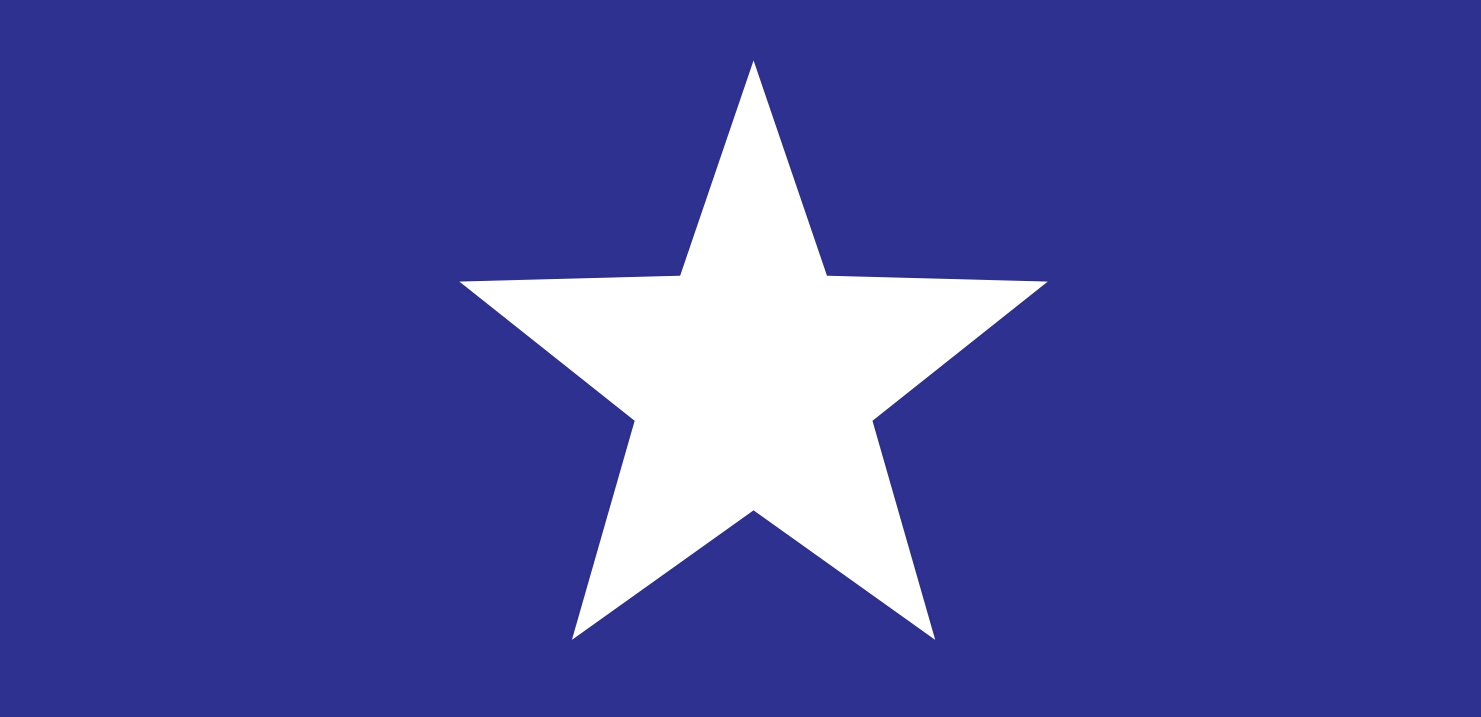

The Peace and Diversity Party (Burmese: မတူကွဲပြားခြင်းနှင့် ငြိမ်းချမ်းရေးပါတီ) is a political party in Myanmar (Burma). It was founded in 2010 and is headquartered in Mingaladon Township, Yangon.

== Political ideology ==
The Peace and Diversity Party has stated that it supports a "humanist and democratic" form of nationalism, and is opposed to any political ideology that is based on a particular class or nationalism based on ethnicity or religion. Despite claims from the party, its chairman, Nay Myo Wai, is a well-known anti-Muslim agitator and openly supports the ultranationalist Ma Ba Tha movement.

== History ==
The Peace and Diversity Party has been campaigning against land confiscations in Myanmar for years; in 2012 the party's support for farmer strikes received national attention. The Zaykabar Company in particular has provoked the ire of the Peace and Diversity Party, as the company is known for illegally confiscating farmland in order to turn them into industrial zones.

The Peace and Diversity Party is opposed to the Ministry of Defence's ownership of farmland that is left unused by the military. The party has actively participated in exchanging ideas and opinions about establishing a federal army and federal union, and called for political dialogue to be held in Thailand back in 2013.

In recent years, the Peace and Diversity Party has shifted its focus towards preventing what it views as the Islamization of Myanmar, but maintains that it is not anti-Islam. The party believes that this view is consistent with its opposition to political ideologies based on a particular class or nationalism based on any ethnicity or religion.

Fourteen candidates of the Peace and Diversity Party contested the 2015 general election.

== Election results ==
=== House of Nationalities (Amyotha Hluttaw) ===
Election	Leader	Total seats won	Total votes	Share of votes	+/-	Status
2010	U Saw Thein Aung	0 / 224	20,909	0.10%	New	Extra-parliamentary
2015	U Saw Thein Aung	0 / 224	Did not contest			Extra-parliamentary
2020	U Saw Thein Aung	0 / 224	Did not contest			Not recognised
2025–26	U Saw Thein Aung	0 / 224	Did not contest			Extra-parliamentary

=== House of Representatives (Pyithu Hluttaw) ===
Election	Leader	Total seats won	Total votes	Share of votes	+/-	Status
2010	U Saw Thein Aung	1 / 440	12,817	0.06%	New	Extra-parliamentary
2015	U Saw Thein Aung	0 / 440	Did not contest			Extra-parliamentary
2020	U Saw Thein Aung	0 / 440	553	0.00%	0	Not recognised
2025–26	U Saw Thein Aung	0 / 440	16,767	0.13%	0	Extra-parliamentary
