= Tun Tun Hein =

His Excellency Tun Tun Hein
- ထွန်းထွန်းဟိန်
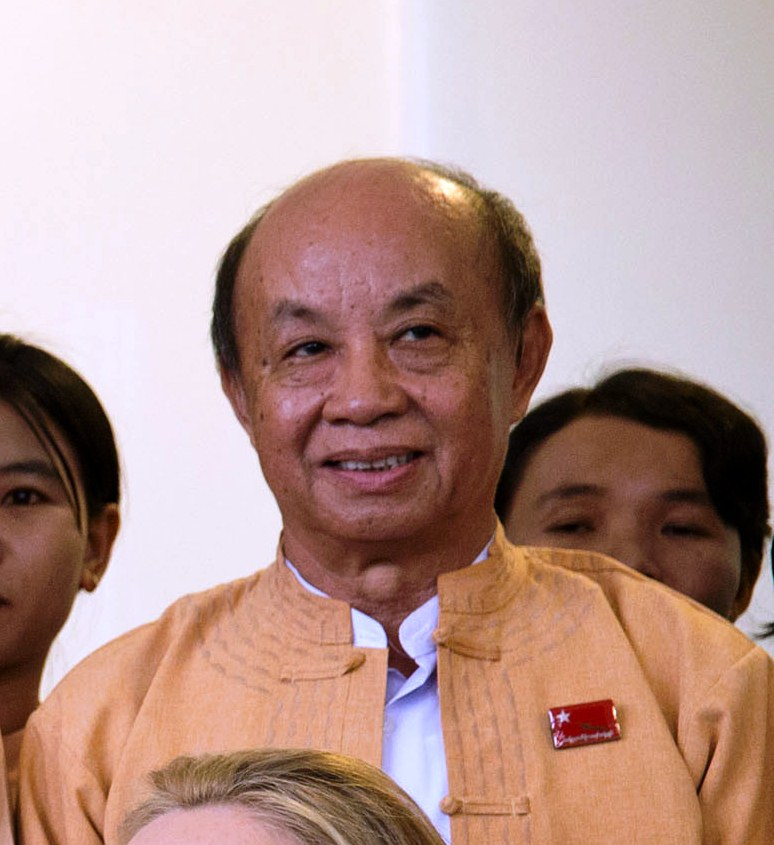
- Tun Tun Hein in 2012

3rd Deputy Speaker of the House of Representatives
- In office 22 March 2018 – 31 January 2021
- Preceded by: T Khun Myat

Member of the Pyithu Hluttaw
- In office 1 February 2016 – 31 January 2021
- Constituency: Nawnghkio Township

Member-elect of the Pyithu Hluttaw
- Preceded by: Constituency established
- Succeeded by: Constituency abolished
- Constituency: Nawnghkio Township
- Majority: 18,886 (56.59%)

Personal details
- Born: 30 April 1949 (age 76) Zipingyi village, Pyinoolwin Township, Burma (Myanmar)
- Party: National League for Democracy
- Spouse: Sein Sein Thein (m. 1973)
- Children: May Thingyan Hein
- Parent(s): Kya Hein (father); Mya Khin (mother)
- Education: B.Sc. Zoology
- Alma mater: Mandalay Arts and Sciences University

Tun Tun Hein (Burmese: ထွန်းထွန်းဟိန်, also known as Tun Aung; born 30 April 1949) is a Burmese politician and former Deputy Speaker of the Pyithu Hluttaw, the lower house of the Myanmar parliament. He also serves as a member of the National League for Democracy's (NLD) Central Executive Committee and heads NLD's voter list review committee.

== Early life ==
Tun Tun Hein was born to parents Kya Hein and Mya Khin. A native of Zipingyi village in Pyinoolwin Township, he graduated from the Mandalay Arts and Science University with a B.Sc. in zoology in 1968.

== Career ==
Tun Aung subsequently became a teacher in Kunlong from 1973 to 1974, and married Sein Sein Thein in 1973. He was arrested in September 1988 for serving as chairman for the Nawnghkio Township General Strike Committee. Tun Tun Hein won the seat in the Pyithu Hluttaw to represent the Nawnghkio Township constituency during the 1990 Burmese general election, winning about 57% of the votes (18,886 valid votes), but was never allowed to assume his seat.

Tun Tun Hein was imprisoned in 2012 and was declared a prisoner of conscience by Amnesty International. He was released in January 2015. In 2015 election, he contested and won the Nawnghkio Township constituency for a seat in the country's lower house.

During the 2021 Myanmar coup d'état on 1 February, Tun Tun Hein was placed under house arrest by the Myanmar Armed Forces.

After capturing Lashio, the MNDAA reportedly freed Tun Tun Hein from the local prison.
