= Speaker of the Pyithu Hluttaw =

Presiding officer of the Pyithu Hluttaw

Speaker of Pyithu Hluttaw
- ပြည်သူ့လွှတ်တော်ဥက္ကဋ္ဌ
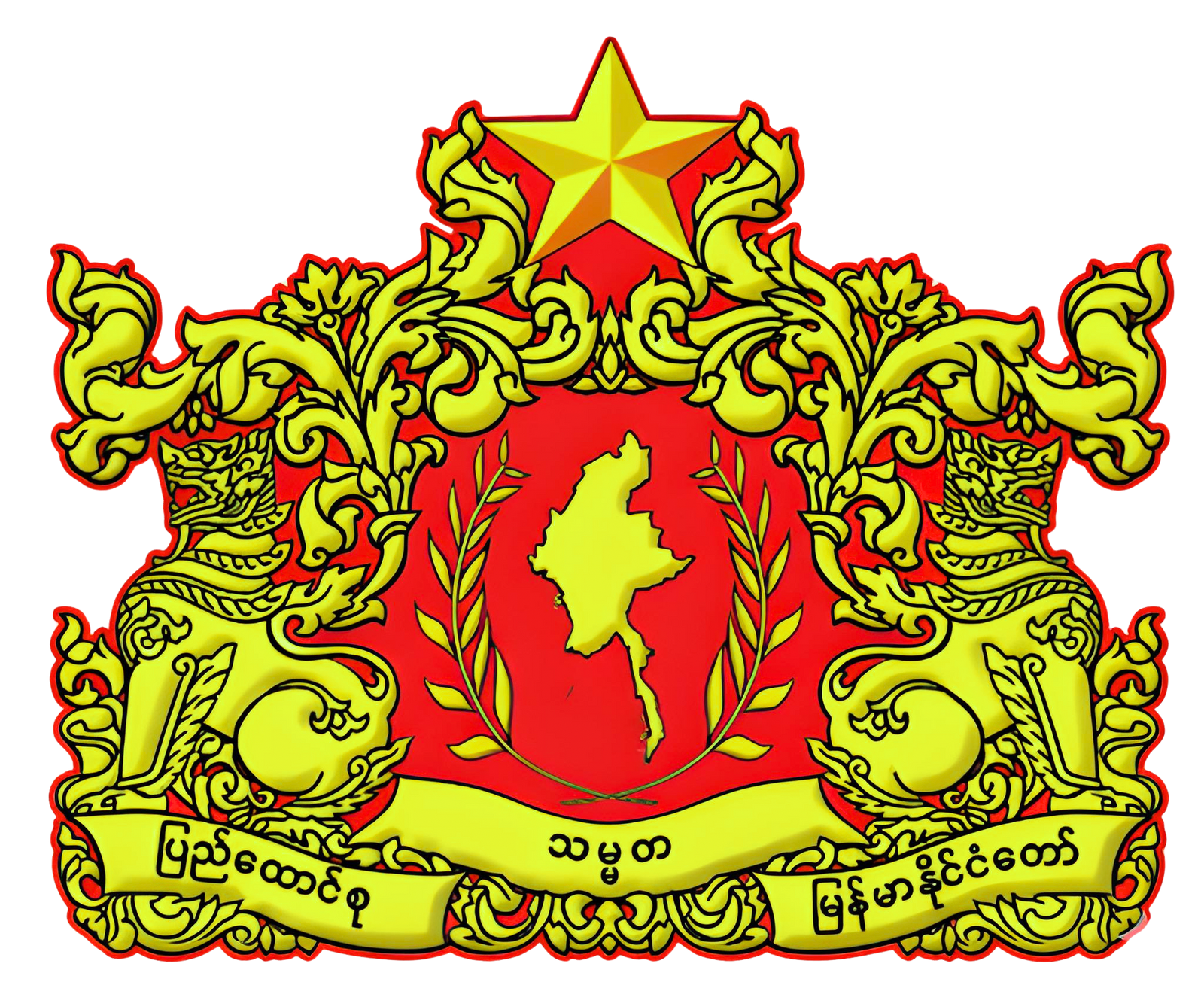
- State Seal of Burma

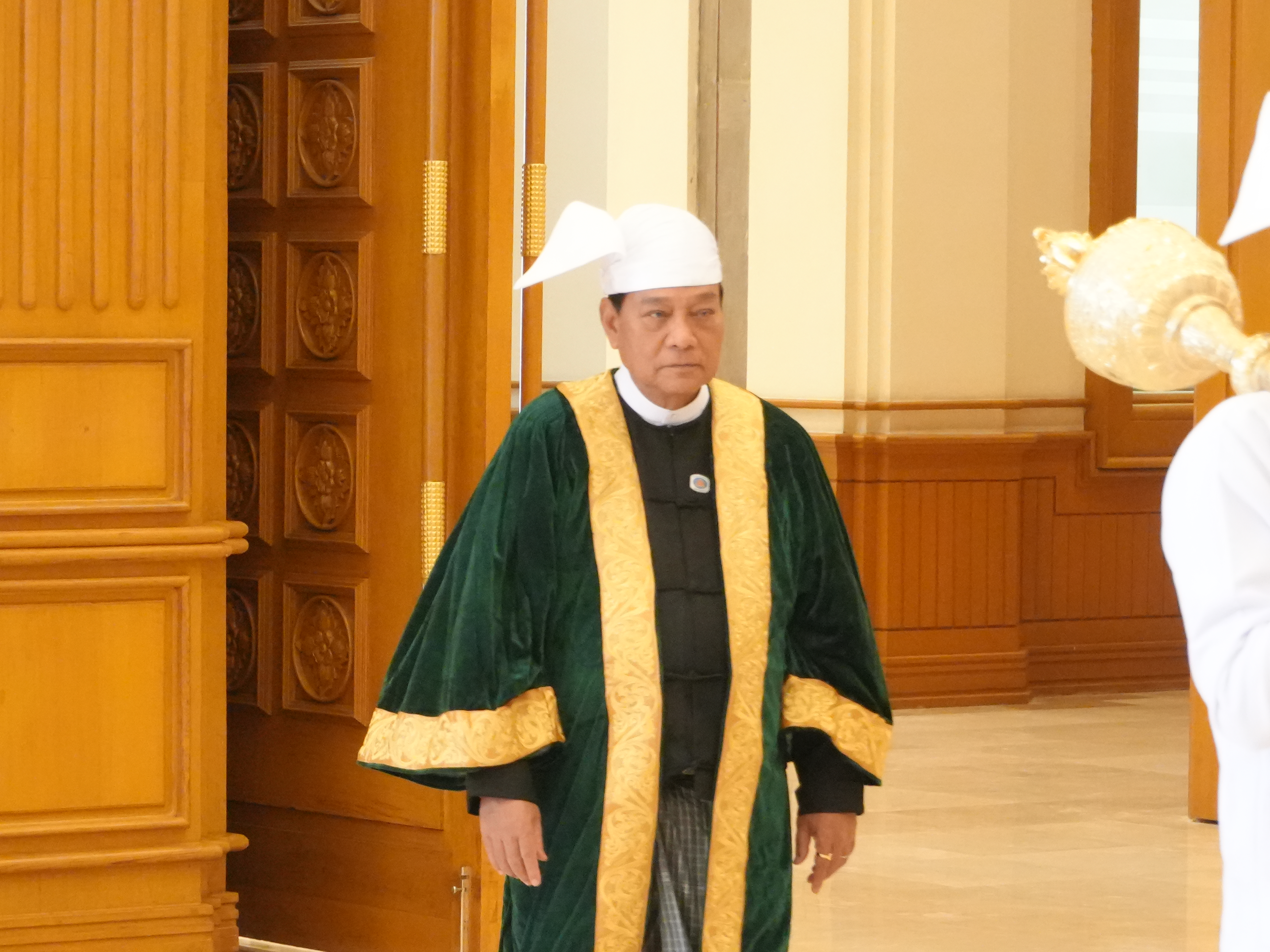
- Incumbent; Khin Yi since 16 March 2026
- Style: H.E.
- Member of: Pyithu Hluttaw
- Nominator: Pyithu Hluttaw
- Appointer: Pyithu Hluttaw
- Term length: 5 years
- Constituting instrument: Constitution of Myanmar
- Formation: 2011
- First holder: Shwe Mann
- Deputy: Deputy Speaker
- Salary: K3.5 million / month

The Speaker of the Pyithu Hluttaw (Burmese: ပြည်သူ့လွှတ်တော် ဥက္ကဋ္ဌ) is the presiding officer or Speaker of the Pyithu Hluttaw.

== Term of Office ==
The term of office of the Speaker of the Pyithu Hluttaw is the same as that of the Pyithu Hluttaw. However, the Speaker and the Deputy Speaker of the Hluttaw serve as the Speaker and the Deputy Speaker until the first regular session of the next Hluttaw term.

== List of speakers of the Pyithu Hluttaw ==
№	Portrait	Name (Born-Died)	Term of office			Political party	Assembly
№	Portrait	Name (Born-Died)	Took office	Left office	Time in office	Political party	Assembly
1		Shwe Mann (born 1947)	31 January 2011	29 January 2016	4 years, 363 days	Union Solidarity and Development Party	1st
2		Win Myint (born 1951)	1 February 2016	21 March 2018	2 years, 48 days	National League for Democracy	2nd
3		T Khun Myat (b. 1949)	22 March 2018	16 March 2026	7 years, 359 days	Independent	2nd
4		Khin Yi (born 1952)	16 March 2026	Incumbent	176 days	Union Solidarity and Development Party	3rd

== List of deputy speakers of the Pyithu Hluttaw ==
№	Portrait	Name (Born-Died)	Term of office			Political party	Assembly
№	Portrait	Name (Born-Died)	Took office	Left office	Time in office	Political party	Assembly
1		Nanda Kyaw Swa (born 1951)	31 January 2011	29 January 2016	4 years, 363 days	Union Solidarity and Development Party	1st
2		T Khun Myat (born 1949)	1 February 2016	21 March 2018	2 years, 48 days	Independent	2nd
3		Tun Tun Hein (born 1949)	22 March 2018	31 January 2021	2 years, 315 days	National League for Democracy	2nd
4		Maung Maung Ohn (born 1950)	16 March 2026	Incumbent	176 days	Union Solidarity and Development Party	3rd
