= Zaykabar Company =

Zaykabar Company Limited
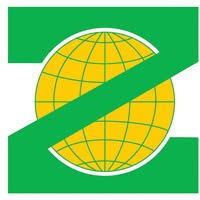
- Company type: Conglomerate
- Industry: Construction
- Founded: 1990; 36 years ago
- Founder: Khin Shwe
- Headquarters: Yangon, Myanmar (Burma)
- Key people: Khin Shwe, Chairman; Zay Thiha, Vice-Chairman
- Parent: National Development Company Group
- Divisions: Mya Yeik Nyo Foundation

Zaykabar Company Limited (Burmese: ဇေကမ္ဘာကုမ္ပဏီ; also spelt Zay Gabar or Zay Ka Bar) is a major Burmese conglomerate with interests in construction and telecommunications. The company was founded by Khin Shwe in 1990.

== Projects ==
In October 2007, Zaykabar opened Royal Mingalardon Golf Course, a 280 acres (1.1 km^{2}) and 21-hole golf course as part of Mingaladon Garden City, a housing estate on the outskirts of Yangon.

In 2008, Zaykabar opened Pyay Garden Condominium, a 25-story condominium tower in Yangon's Mayangone Township, the tallest building in Myanmar.

Zaykabar also owns and operates Mya Yeik Nyo Royal Hotel in Yangon.

In May 2010, after the privatization of the country's petrol market, Zaykabar was one of few companies to be issued operating licenses for petrol stations, under the name of Toe Naing Mann, Shwe Mann's son.

In September 2011, Zaykabar established its philanthropic arm, Mya Yeik Nyo Foundation for Health, Education and Culture.

Zaykabar operates 2 entertainment venues at Yangon's Kandawgyi Lake, the Karaweik Oo Yin Kabar fun fair area (which includes a mini-zoo and playgrounds) and the Myaw Sin Kyun Island, a concert venue.

Zaykabar also owns Cherry FM, a radio station in Taunggyi but broadcast from Yangon. The station is headed by Khin Shwe's daughter, Zay Zin Latt.

== Controversies ==
In the 1990s, Zaykabar hired Bain & Company, among other firms, to lobby on behalf of the Burmese government to lift trade sanctions in the United States.

In 1997, Zaykabar seized 5,000 acres (20 km^{2}) of land in Mingaladon Township (on the outskirts of Yangon) to construct Mingaladon Garden City, including an industrial zone (Yangon Industrial Zone No. 4), office towers, a mall, 4,000 residential bungalows and a 21-hole golf course. In February 2010, Zaykabar acquired an additional 845 acres (3.42 km^{2}) of land from Shwenantha village. Farmers allege that they were coerced and duped into giving up their land tenure rights in exchange for paltry compensation. Some farmers received 300,000 kyat in compensation, far below the existing market value of 2 million kyat per acre. Others received little to no compensation.

In May 2012, Zaykabar defied government orders to halt the bulldozing of farmlands. On 17 May 2012, the said farmers filed an application with the Ministry of National Planning and Economic Development to establish a farming collective, the Shwe Wah Su Paung Nyi Nyar Company, to be better positioned to retain their right to farm their lands. In July 2012, farmers protested the confiscation of their farmland, as many farmers had received little or no compensation. Zaykabar's chairman Khin Shwe, who is currently an Amyotha Hluttaw MP, refuted the farmers' grievances at a parliamentary session on 23 July 2012. That same day, the company filed defamation charges against Nay Myo Wai, a Peace and Diversity Party politician who has been advocating on behalf of the farmers.

In September 2011, 150 rubber plantation farmers from Mon State's Kyaikmaraw Township protested the confiscation of 830 acres (3.4 km^{2}) of land by Zaykabar. The farmers had been unfairly compensated for their land, each receiving about 350,000 kyat in total, far below the existing market value of 800,000 to 3 million kyat per acre. A $220 million USD cement factory project is in progress, that will be capable of manufacturing 3,300 tons of cement daily.

In 2019, the Kayin State Government alleged that Zayzakabar had constructed a complex, including a market, rest hall, workers’ quarters, roads, a bridge and a wellness room in Thandaunggyi Township without permission from development committees.

In April 2018, Zaykabar Company demolished a Yangon heritage site, the Mayor's Residence, which is listed on the YCDC's Yangon City Heritage List. The demolition sparked controversy over Yangon City Development Committee's oversight from watchdog groups like the Yangon Heritage Trust. YCDC subsequently granted approval for Zaykabar to construct a $500 million development project, the Myayeiknyo Royal Project, on the site of the former heritage building. The project has also been opposed by locals for its proximity to other heritage sites like Shwedagon Pagoda, and for concerns that the development may impact the adjacent Kokkine reservoir, which distributes water to eight townships. In June 2018, amid ongoing controversy, the Burmese military ordered Zaykabar to reconstruct the Mayor's Residence "in the original style." Later that year, in October 2018, the military terminated its lease contract with Zaykabar, over contractual breaches, as Zaykabar had signed a joint venture agreement with a Chinese company.
