= Ayer Shwe Wah =

Ayer Shwe Wah Company
- Native name: ဧရာရွှေဝါကုမ္ပဏီ
- Founded: January 1998
- Headquarters: Bahan Township, Yangon, Myanmar
- Key people: Aung Thet Mann (CEO)
- Owner: Aung Thet Mann
- Website: aysw.com.mm

Ayer Shwe Wah Company (Burmese: ဧရာရွှေဝါကုမ္ပဏီ) was a major Burmese company under the Htoo Group of Companies. The company was the first private company to be permitted to export Burmese-grown rice to Bangladesh and Singapore in 2005. Its headquarters are located in Bahan Township, Yangon. Ayer Shwe Wah's CEO, Aung Thet Mann, is the son of Shwe Mann, a former military general and currently Speaker of the Pyithu Hluttaw.

The company has been sanctioned by the United States government since 18 October 2007, for its ties to the ruling military junta, the State Peace and Development Council. On 15 May 2010, it won a license to operate gas stations in Myanmar, as part of the Ministry of Energy's privatization efforts.

When Shwe Mann was Regional Commander in the Ayeyarwady Division, Ayer Shwe Wah received lucrative government contracts to supply fertilizers to farmers throughout the delta. The company also received 30,000 acres of land for development under the government’s Lowland Development Program. These have since been returned with all dues and taxes paid for.

Ayer Shwe Wah has also been involved in construction projects in Naypyidaw.
