= Khin Shwe =

Burmese business tycoon

H.E. Dr. Khin Shwe
- ခင်ရွှေ
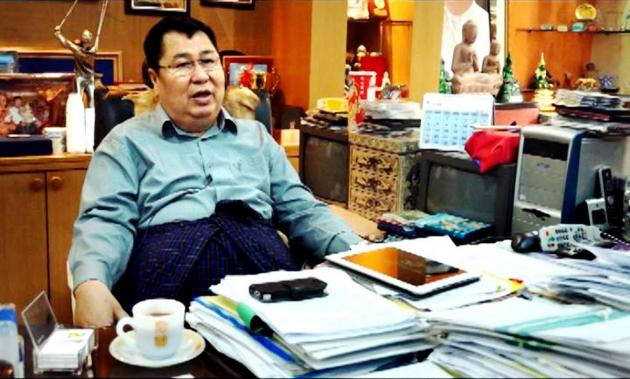

Chairman of the Zaykabar Company
- In office 1990 – Present day
- Constituency: Yangon Region № 9 Twante, Kawhmu, and Kungyangon Townships
- Majority: 173,208 (73.76%)

Personal details
- Born: 21 January 1952 (age 74) Moulmein, Burma
- Spouse: San San Kywe (m. 1975)
- Children: Zay Thiha; Zay Zin Latt
- Parent(s): Saw Nyunt (father); Daw Daung (mother)
- Occupation: Chairman of Zaykabar Company

H.E. Dr. Khin Shwe (Burmese: ခင်ရွှေ; born 21 January 1952) Burmese business tycoon who developed the company from a SME Construction company into one of the leading local property company and positioned Zaykabar Company Limited as holding company for many of its subsidiaries which involves Property Development, Hotel & Tourism, Banking & Investment, Industrial, Road Development, Trading, Media and Technology sectors. He served as a Member of parliament in the House of Nationalities for Yangon Region № 9 constituency from 2011 to 2016 and was later expelled from the USDP as he was close to Aung San Suu Kyi. He is the chairman of Zaykabar Construction, one of the country's largest construction companies. He also serves as chairman for the National Development Group of Companies, Myanmar Tourism Board and the Myanmar Construction Entrepreneurs Association.

== Early life and education ==
Khin Shwe was born in Moulmein (now Mawlamyaing), Burma to ethnic Mon-Burmese parents, Saw Nyunt and Daw Daung. He attended a technical high school in Maymyo and worked for the Burmese government until 1988, as a construction and survey engineer. Khin Shwe claims to hold two honorary doctorate degrees in business administration. However, both are from unaccredited for-profit diploma mills, Washington University and Cal Southern University.

== Business holding ==
In 1988, he established Padamya Company with Htein Win and 2 other partners. In 1990, he formed his own construction company, Zaykabar Company, one of the country's largest construction companies. Later, he became chairman of the National Development Group of Companies, Myanmar Tourism Board and the Myanmar Construction Entrepreneurs Association.

The Burmese government has awarded him two titles: Thiri Thudhamma Manijotadhara (1998) and Agga Maha Thirithudhamma Manijhotadhara (2001). Khin Shwe is head of Sasana Nogghaha, a religious organization supported by the Burmese government. Khin Shwe was featured on the US’s Specially Designated Nationals list for more than ten years. He saw his name removed with the lifting of sanctions by the White House in October 2016.

Along with Htay Myint, Dagon Win Aung and Nay Zin Latt, Khin Shwe serves as a patron of the Myanmar Hoteliers Association.

Shwe Mann and Khin Shwe are related by marriage: Shwe Mann's son, Toe Naing Mann, is married to Zay Zin Latt (ဇေဇင်လတ်), Khin Shwe's daughter. Khin Shwe's son Zay Thiha (ဇေသီဟ), promoter of the World Lethwei Championship, is married to Nanda Hlaing, a Burmese actress and model.

In 2021, he opened Zaykabar Museum, the largest private museum in Myanmar, in Yangon.

== Political career ==
He is a member of the Union Solidarity and Development Party. In the 2010 Myanmar general election, he contested the Yangon Region № 9 constituency winning a majority of 173,208 (73.76 percent of the votes), won a House of Nationalities seat.

In the aftermath of the 2021 Myanmar coup d'état, he was arrested and sent to Insein Prison on 21 March 2022 along with his son Zay Thiha, following a conflict over a failed building development on military-owned land in Yangon. They are the first major cronies to be arrested after the coup. Khin Shwe was released in September 2024 on reported health grounds with a junta pardon.
