= Thein Sein =

President of Myanmar from 2011 to 2016 (born 1945)

Agga Maha Thray Sithu Agga Maha Thiri Thudhamma Thein Sein
- သိန်းစိန်
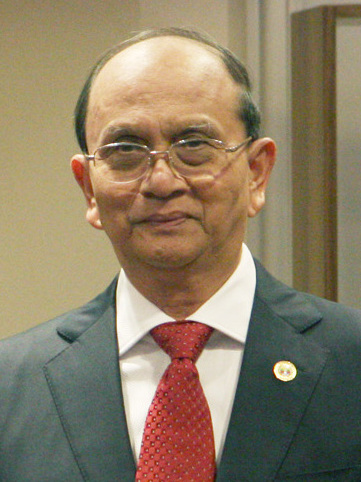
- Thein Sein in 2013

8th President of Myanmar
- In office 30 March 2011 – 30 March 2016
- Vice President: See list: First Vice President; Tin Aung Myint Oo (2011–2012); Sai Mauk Kham (2012–2016); Second Vice President; Sai Mauk Kham (2011–2012); Vacant (Jul–Aug 2012); Nyan Tun (2012–2016)
- Preceded by: Office re-established; Than Shwe (as Chairman of the State Peace and Development Council); Maung Maung (as President, 1988)
- Succeeded by: Htin Kyaw

11th Prime Minister of Myanmar
- In office 12 October 2007 – 30 March 2011
- Leader: Than Shwe
- Preceded by: Soe Win
- Succeeded by: Office abolished; Min Aung Hlaing (2021)
Other offices held
Chairman of the Union Solidarity and Development Party
In office 29 April 2010 – 29 August 2016
Deputy	Shwe Mann; Htay Oo
Preceded by	Position established
Succeeded by	Than Htay
Secretary 1 of the State Peace and Development Council
In office 19 October 2004 – 12 October 2007
Preceded by	Soe Win
Succeeded by	Tin Aung Myint Oo
Secretary 2 of the State Peace and Development Council
In office 25 August 2003 – 19 October 2004
Preceded by	Soe Win
Succeeded by	Tin Aung Myint Oo

Member of the Pyithu Hluttaw for Zabuthiri
- In office 31 January 2011 – 30 March 2011
- Preceded by: Constituency established
- Succeeded by: Sanda Min

Personal details
- Born: 20 April 1945 (age 81) Kyounku, Burma (now Myanmar)
- Party: USDP (since 2016)
- Spouse: Khin Khin Win
- Children: 3
- Education: Defence Services Academy

Military service
- Allegiance: Myanmar
- Branch/service: Myanmar Army
- Years of service: 1968–2010
- Rank: General

Thein Sein (Burmese: သိန်းစိန်; IPA: [θéɪɰ̃ sèɪɰ̃]; born 20 April 1945) is a Burmese politician and retired army general who served as the eighth president of Myanmar from 2011 to 2016. He previously served as 11th prime minister from 2007 to 2010, and was considered by many in and outside Myanmar as a reformist leader in the post-junta government.

His government undertook a series of political reforms including some deregulation of the country's censored media, releasing many political prisoners and halting the country's controversial large Chinese-led hydro-power project. The developments that followed included Myanmar's appointment to chair ASEAN in 2014, improved relations with the United States, the release of Aung San Suu Kyi – his 2015 general election rival – from house arrest, and the reinstatement of major opposition party National League for Democracy (NLD) in the by-election held on 1 April 2012.

== Early life ==
Thein Sein was born in Kyonku, a small Irrawaddy Delta village near Hainggyi Island in what is now Ngapudaw Township to Maung Phyo (father) and Khin Nyunt (mother) in 1944 during the Japanese occupation. He was the youngest of three children. His parents were landless farmers, and his father made a living carrying cargo at the river jetty and weaving bamboo mats. Thein Sein's father Maung Phyo became a Buddhist monk 10 years after his wife's death, and spent his remaining years as a monk.

== Military career ==
Thein Sein graduated from the 9th intake of the Defence Services Academy with a Bachelor of Arts degree in 1968, becoming a second lieutenant afterward. Throughout Thein Sein's four-decade long military career, he was considered a bureaucrat, not a combat soldier. In 1988, he served as a major for Sagaing Division's 55th Light Infantry Division and later served as a commander for Sagaing Division's 89th Infantry Battalion in Kalay Township. The following year, he studied at the Command and General Staff College in Kalaw, Shan State.

By 1991, he had returned to Yangon, after being promoted to the rank of colonel and 1st Grade General Staff Officer in the War Office. He was then promoted to brigadier general, but remained at his position in the War Office, which marked the first time a brigadier general was promoted to General Staff Officer. In 1993, he was recruited as the commander of Yangon Division's Military Operations Command 4 in Hmawbi. Three years later in 1996, he was appointed to lead the new Triangle Regional Military Command in Kyaingtong, Shan State, serving this role for another three years (1998–2001).

In 1998, he became a member of the State Peace and Development Council and was appointed as Secretary-2 in 2001. He was promoted to the rank of lieutenant general that year. After General Khin Nyunt was deposed and General Soe Win became Prime Minister in 2004, he was promoted to Secretary-1 and promoted to General in late 2004.

== Prime minister ==
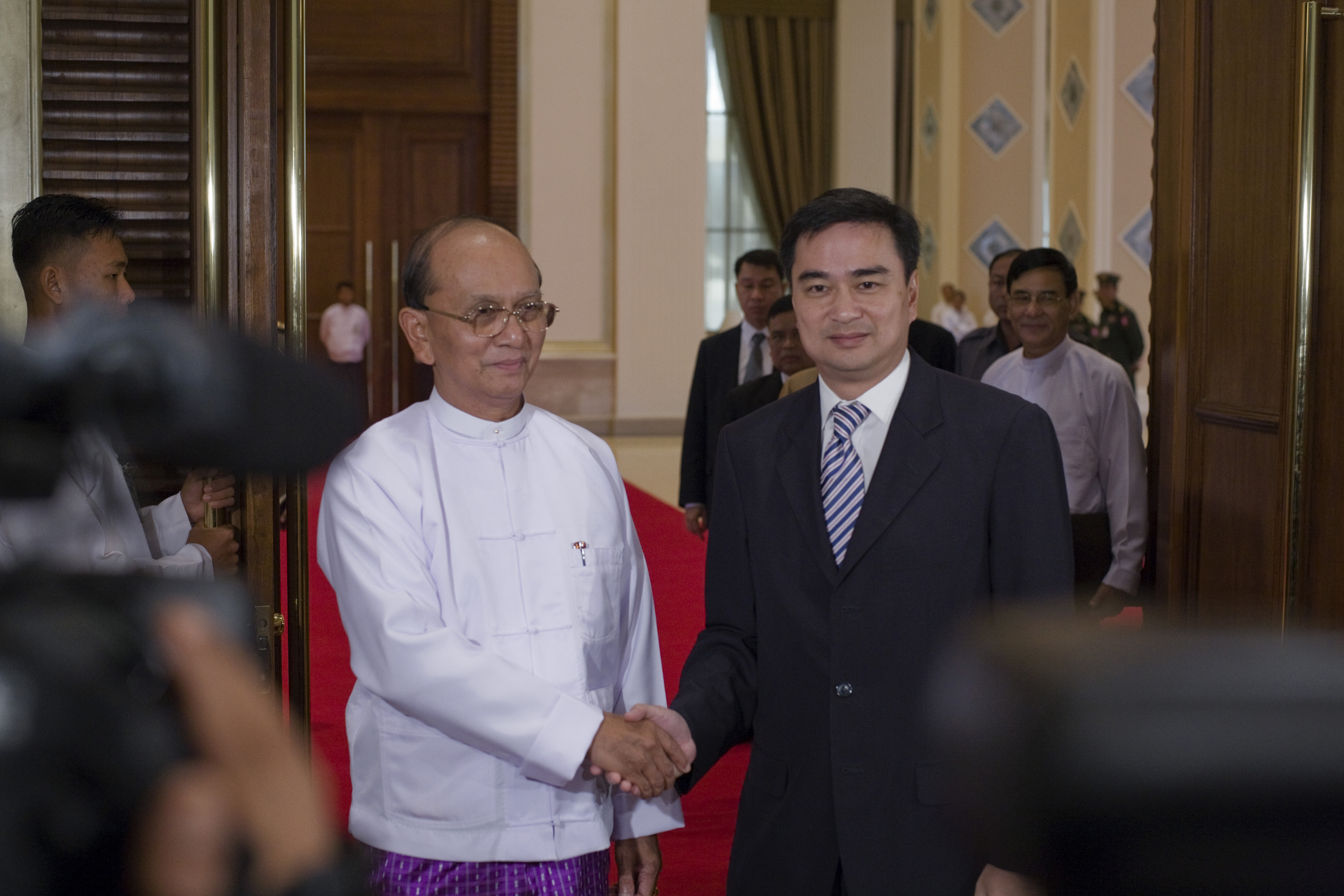
Thein Sein and Thai PM Abhisit Vejjajiva during a state visit to Naypyidaw on 11 October 2010.

Thein Sein was appointed in April 2007 by the nation's ruling military junta as interim prime minister, replacing General Soe Win, who was undergoing medical treatment for leukaemia. He was formally appointed as General Soe Win's permanent successor on 24 October 2007 after Soe Win's death on 12 October 2007.

He held the position of first secretary in the ruling State Peace and Development Council junta. He was the country's fourth-highest ranking general, and also served as the chairman of the government-sponsored National Convention Convening Commission. Thein Sein carried out high-level negotiations with Bangladesh and Cambodia.

In 2007, sometime after his official appointment as prime minister, he was promoted to the rank of general from lieutenant general. On his first official visit outside Myanmar as prime minister, Thein Sein carried out high-level negotiations with Laos, Vietnam and Cambodia. In the aftermath of Cyclone Nargis in May 2008, he led the National Disaster Preparedness Central Committee as chairman and was criticised for the government's systematic blocking of relief efforts.

== Presidency ==
=== Election and appointment ===
On 29 April 2010, he retired from the military, along with 22 other military officials, to lead the Union Solidarity and Development Party as a civilian. During the 2010 general election, he was head of the Union Solidarity and Development Party (USDP), which contested in a controversial election and won the overwhelming majority of seats in the Pyidaungsu Hluttaw. Thein Sein ran against National Unity Party candidate Kyaw Aye during the election, contesting a Pyithu Hluttaw seat to represent the constituents of Naypyidaw Union Territory's Zabuthiri Township. He purportedly won 91.2% of the votes (65,620).

On 4 February 2011, he was elected by the Pyidaungsu Hluttaw's Presidential Electoral College as the next President of Myanmar, becoming the country's first non-interim civilian president in 49 years. Tin Aung Myint Oo and Sai Mauk Kham were named as the new vice-presidents. He was sworn in on 30 March 2011 alongside the two vice-presidents and the newly elected parliament.

=== Regional policy ===
In the first month of his presidency, he sought the support of ASEAN Secretary-General Surin Pitsuwan to support Myanmar's bid to chair the ASEAN Summit in 2014. As of July 2011, the government has formed a planning committee led by foreign affairs minister Wunna Maung Lwin. In his presidency, Myanmar took the ASEAN chairmanship in 2014. ASEAN summit was held in Naypyidaw in the same year.

=== Domestic policy ===
Some have considered Thein Sein as a moderate because he was willing to engage with Aung San Suu Kyi; he had a high-profile meeting with her in Naypyidaw on 19 August 2011. On 17 August 2011, he was quoted by the state newspaper, The New Light of Myanmar as saying:

We will make reviews to make sure that Myanmar [Burmese] citizens living abroad for some reasons can return home if they have not committed any crimes. And if a Myanmar citizen in a foreign country who committed crimes applies for returning home to serve terms, we will show our benevolent attitude in dealing with his case.

Various news sources interpreted his suggestion as an invitation for overseas Burmese citizens to return to their country of origin and help rebuild the Burmese economy.

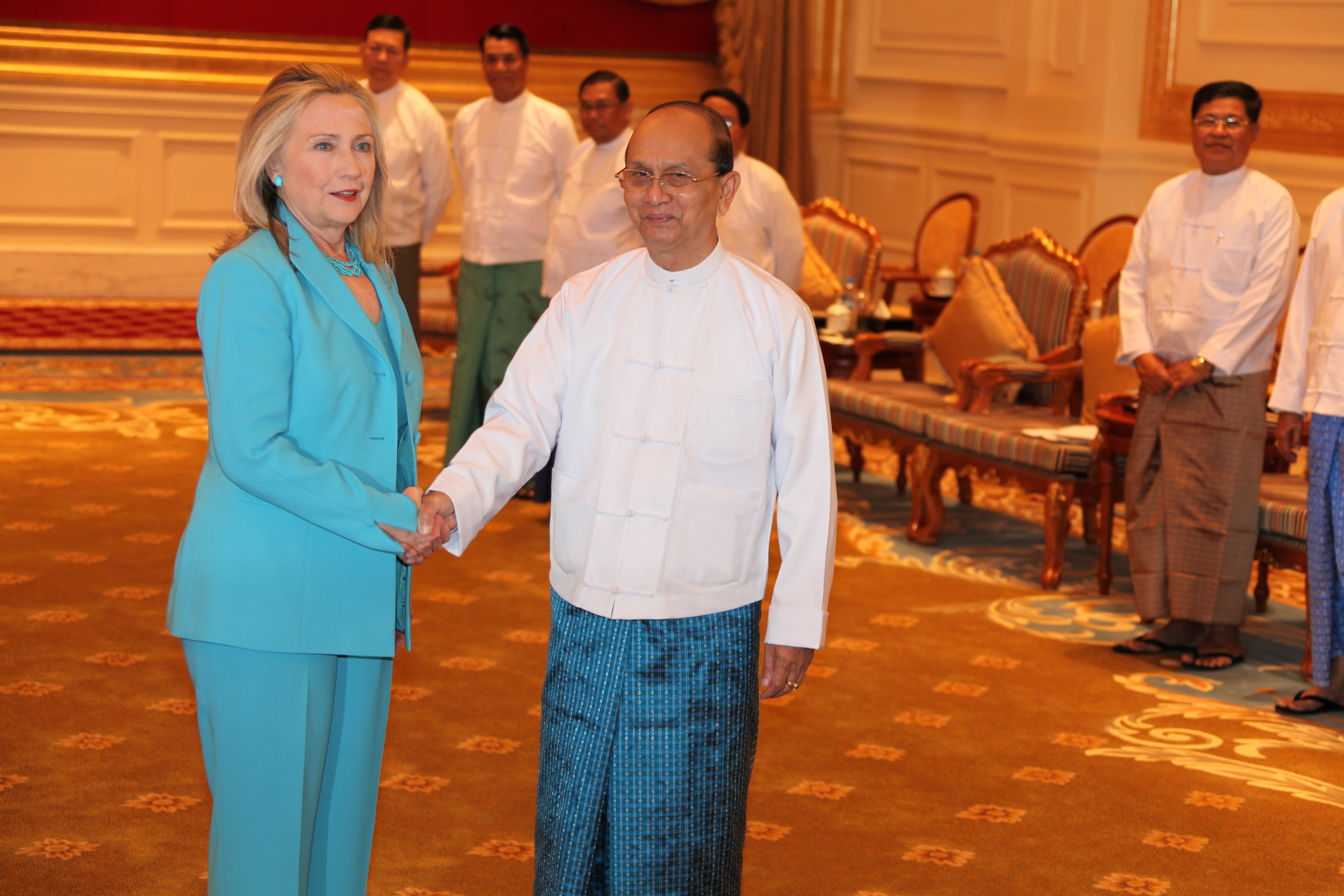
United States Secretary of State Hillary Clinton meets with Burma's President Thein Sein in Naypyitaw, 1 December 2011.

In 2012, Thein Sein proposed that the minority Rohingya ethnic group, which had lived in Burma for hundreds of years, be "resettled" abroad, a proposal the United Nations was quick to object to. Thein Sein has also supported domestic policies that label Rohingya as "non-citizens". He has said that the 2012 Rakhine State riots "has nothing to do with race or religion."

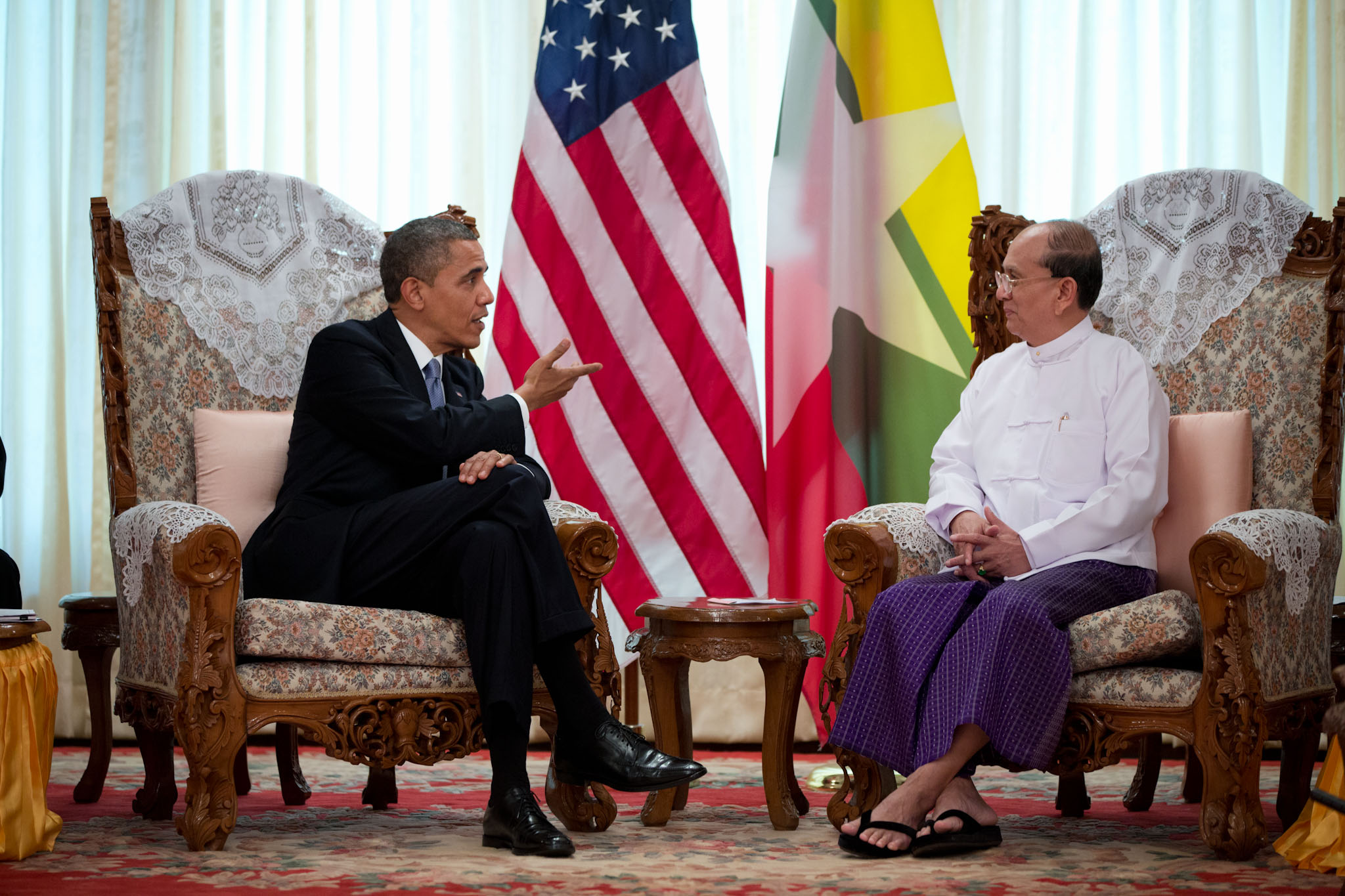
Thein Sein meets US President Barack Obama in Rangoon, 19 November 2012

=== 2012 cabinet reshuffle ===
On 27 August 2012, Thein Sein announced a major cabinet reshuffle of 9 ministers and 15 deputy ministers, to consolidate the authority of his office by removing hardliner ministers and replacing them with political allies. Among the more prominent changes was the transfer of Kyaw Hsan from the post of Minister for Information to Minister of Cooperatives, and the appointment of Aung Min, Tin Naing Thein and Soe Thein, all former lieutenants under Thein Sein, to the posts of Minister of the President's Office.

=== Union Solidarity and Development Party ===
On 16 October 2012, Thein Sein was re-elected as the chairman of the Union Solidarity and Development Party (USDP) at the USDP's first party conference in Naypyidaw. This is in direct contradiction to the 2008 Constitution of Myanmar, which states:

If the President or the Vice-Presidents are members of a political party, they shall not take part in its party activities during their term of office from the day of their election.

According to the constitution, he was technically barred from taking part in party activities during his term of office. Because of mounting criticism over his dual role, Thein Sein handed over the chairman position of party to Shwe Mann on 1 May 2013. But Thein Sein will continue to play a leadership role within the ruling party and did not disqualify himself from consideration as the party's presidential candidate of 2015 election.

== Post-presidency ==
A day after Thein Sein left office, the Democratic Voices of Burma published a news article that the ex-president would be ordaining as a monk on 1 April 2016 for a few days, a tradition for Burmese Buddhist men. According to the DVB, a "spokesperson close to the President" refused to disclose where he would be ordained, but it would be in a "small, peaceful town".

According to a Facebook post, he was temporarily ordained under Ashin Nandamalabhivamsa in a monastery in Pyin Oo Lwin under the monastic name U Santidhamma. Thein Sein has since lived in quiet retirement, maintaining his silence following the 2021 Myanmar coup d'état.

== Personal life ==
Thein Sein is married to Khin Khin Win. The couple have three daughters. One of his daughters, Yin Thuzar Thein, is married to military captain Han Win Aung. He suffers from heart disease and uses a pacemaker.

Political offices
Preceded by Soe Win	Prime Minister of Myanmar; 2007–2011	Vacant Title next held by Min Aung Hlaing (2021)
Preceded by Than Shwe as Chairman of the State Peace and Development Council of Myanmar	President of Myanmar; 2011–2016	Succeeded by Htin Kyaw
Diplomatic posts
Preceded by Hassanal Bolkiah	Chairperson of ASEAN; 2014	Succeeded by Najib Razak
