= Kanyutkwin =

- Town
- Location in Burma
- Coordinates: 18°21′0″N 96°30′0″E
- Country: Myanmar
- Region: Bago Region
- District: Taungoo
- Township: Phyu
- Time zone: UTC+6.30 (MST)
- Area code: 54

Kanyutkwin (Burmese: ကညွတ်ကွင်းမြို့) is a town in Pyu Township, Taungoo District, Pegu region in Myanmar, also known as Burma.

== Etymology ==
Kanyutkwin: Kanyut - a breed of plant + Kwin - lake. Kanyutkwin: Lake with Kanyut plants.
