= Sai Mauk Kham =

Burmese politician and physician

Dr. Sai Mauk Kham
- စိုင်းမောက်ခမ်း
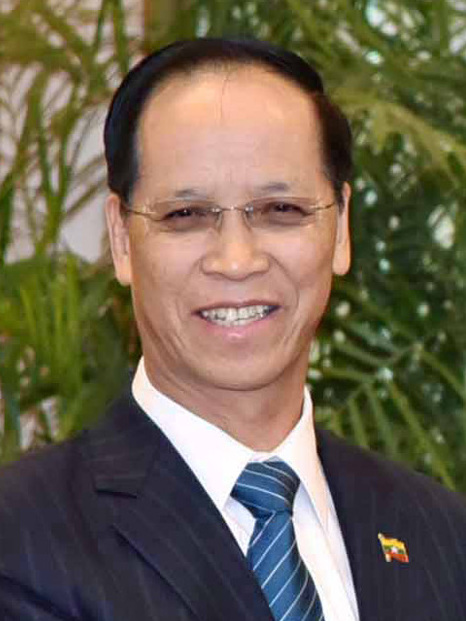
- Mauk Kham in 2015

Member of the Pyithu Hluttaw
- In office 31 March 2016 – 1 February 2021
- Constituency: Lashio Township

2nd First Vice President of Myanmar
- In office 1 July 2012 – 30 March 2016 Serving with Nyan Tun
- President: Thein Sein
- Preceded by: Tin Aung Myint Oo
- Succeeded by: Myint Swe

1st Second Vice President of Myanmar
- In office 30 March 2011 – 1 July 2012 Serving with Tin Aung Myint Oo
- President: Thein Sein
- Preceded by: Position established
- Succeeded by: Nyan Tun

Personal details
- Born: 17 August 1949 (age 77) Muse, Shan State, Myanmar
- Party: Union Solidarity and Development Party
- Spouse: Nang Shwe Hmone
- Children: 3, including Sai Si Tom Kham
- Education: University of Medicine, Mandalay
- Occupation: Politician, physician

Dr. Sai Mauk Kham (Shan: ၸၢႆးမွၵ်ႇၶမ်း, Burmese: စိုင်းမောက်ခမ်း [sáɪɰ̃ maʊʔ kʰáɰ̃]; born 17 August 1949) is a Burmese politician and physician who currently serves as a House of Representatives MP for Lashio Township constituency. He previously served as First Vice President of Myanmar from 1 July 2012 to 30 March 2016. He was elected as Vice President of Myanmar on 4 February 2011, defeating Aye Maung of the Rakhine Nationalities Development Party and receiving 84% of the votes (140 of 167 votes) in the Amyotha Hluttaw.

== Early life and education ==
Sai was born on 17 August 1949 in Muse, Shan State, Burma (now Myanmar) to a family of Shan descent. He is a physician by profession, having graduated from the Institute of Medicine, Mandalay (now the University of Medicine, Mandalay) in 1974.

== Career ==
He also used to be the chairman of the Shan Literature and Culture Association. He runs a private clinic and manages a private hospital in Lashio Township.

=== Electoral fraud ===
In the 2015 general election, Sai Mauk Kham contested a Pyithu Hluttaw (lower house) seat in Lashio Township. There were allegations of voting fraud which pulled him forward, in a constituency where National League for Democracy (NLD) was expected to win. 11,815 advanced votes had arrived at Lashio’s election commission office at midnight on 9 November 2015, almost eight hours after the polls had closed and the ballot boxes had been sealed shut. Nearly all of the votes had gone to Sai Mauk Kham. The NLD, Shan Nationalities League for Democracy and Shan Nationalities Democratic Party filed a complaint with the Union Election Commission (UEC). The UEC responded by declaring that Sai Mauk Kham's victory was legal and that no fraud had taken place.

== Personal life ==
Sai Mauk Kham is married to Nang Shwe Hmone. They have three children, including Sai Si Tom Kham, a pop singer.

Political offices
New office	Second Vice President of Myanmar; 2011–2012	Succeeded by Nyan Tun
Preceded by Tin Aung Myint Oo	First Vice President of Myanmar; 2012–2016	Succeeded by Myint Swe
