= CBOSS Corporation =

Russian telecom company

CBOSS Corporation (Convergent Business Operation Support System) is a telecom company primarily based in Russia and with offices located in Finland, UAE and Vietnam. CBOSS Corporation, also known as CBOSS Group, develops IT solutions for the automation of telecommunications enterprises.

One of the three biggest Russian mobile operators, MTS used the CBOSS billing solution from 1998 until 2004, when it switched to FORIS OSS-IN from STROM Telecom company

In 2004 CBOSS was rated as the 11th biggest IT company in Russia by CNews.ru. In 2006, CBOSS Corporation was recognized as the #1 IT-provider of integrated solutions for telecommunications in EMEA by Informa Telecoms Group

In February 2004 CBOSS acquired the online billing solutions subsidiary of Fujitsu Services Oy and its product - rtBilling (CBOSSrtb) prepaid billing system. This system was used by several mobile operators: Britain O2, Australian Optus, Canadian Rogers, Austrian One GmbH and Columbian Colombia Movil.

In 2008 CBOSS was selected by German MVNECO GmbH to provide IT infrastructure and IT solutions to implement mobile virtual network activities.
