= Tin Aung Myint Oo =

Burmese former military official and politician

Thihathura Tin Aung Myint Oo
- တင်အောင်မြင့်ဦး
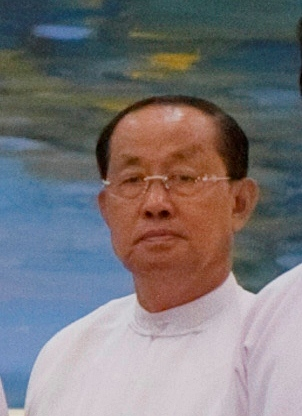
- Tin Aung Myint Oo in 2010

1st First Vice President of Myanmar
- In office 30 March 2011 – 1 July 2012 Serving with Sai Mauk Kham
- President: Thein Sein
- Preceded by: Position established
- Succeeded by: Sai Mauk Kham

Member of the Burmese House of Representatives
- In office 31 January 2011 – 30 March 2011
- Preceded by: Constituency established
- Succeeded by: Zayar Thaw
- Constituency: Pobbathiri Township
- Majority: 44,305 (90.57%)

Secretary 1 of the State Peace and Development Council
- In office 25 October 2007 – 7 November 2010
- Preceded by: Thein Sein
- Succeeded by: Position abolished

Secretary 2 of the State Peace and Development Council
- In office 19 October 2004 – 25 October 2007
- Preceded by: Thein Sein
- Succeeded by: Position abolished

Personal details
- Born: 29 May 1949 (age 77) Burma (now Myanmar)
- Party: USDP
- Spouse: Khin Saw Hnin
- Children: Naing Linn Oo
- Education: Defence Services Academy
- Occupation: Army Officer
- Awards: Thihathura

Military service
- Allegiance: Myanmar
- Branch/service: Myanmar Army
- Rank: General

Thihathura Tin Aung Myint Oo (Burmese: တင်အောင်မြင့်ဦး [tɪ̀ɰ̃ àʊɰ̃ mjɪ̰ɰ̃ ʔú]; born 29 May 1949) is a Burmese former military official and politician who was the First Vice President of Myanmar from 30 March 2011 to 1 July 2012. He is also chairman of Burmese Trade Council, having been appointed in November 2007 by Than Shwe, in response to Saffron Revolution demonstrations in October of that year, and Minister of Military Affairs. He joined the Buddhist monkhood on 3 May 2012, after speculation over his disappearance had circulated in the news media.

== Military career ==
Tin graduated from the 12th intake of the Defence Services Academy and subsequently earned the title "Thihathura" in 1980 for fighting the Communist Party of Burma. He was nominated into the State Peace and Development Council in 2007 as Secretary (1), replacing Thein Sein, and was promoted to general in March 2009.

== Political career ==
In the 2010 Burmese general election, he contested the Pobbathiri Township constituency and won a seat in the Pyithu Hluttaw, reportedly winning 90.57% of the votes. Tin Aung Myint Oo was sworn in as a Vice-President on 30 March 2011, along with Sai Mauk Kham and thereafter vacated his parliamentary seat. He is one of the wealthiest members in the former SPDC, and is well known for close ties with Zaw Zaw, a Burmese tycoon. He formerly served as the chairman of Myanmar Economics Corporation (MEC), an conglomerate owned by the Burmese military.

On 1 July 2012, he submitted his resignation as vice president, citing health reasons.

== Personal life ==
Tin Aung Myint Oo is married to Khin Saw Hnin and has a son, Naing Lin Oo, a military captain.

Political offices
Preceded by Position established	First Vice President of Myanmar; 2011–2012	Succeeded by Sai Mauk Kham
