= Internet in Myanmar =

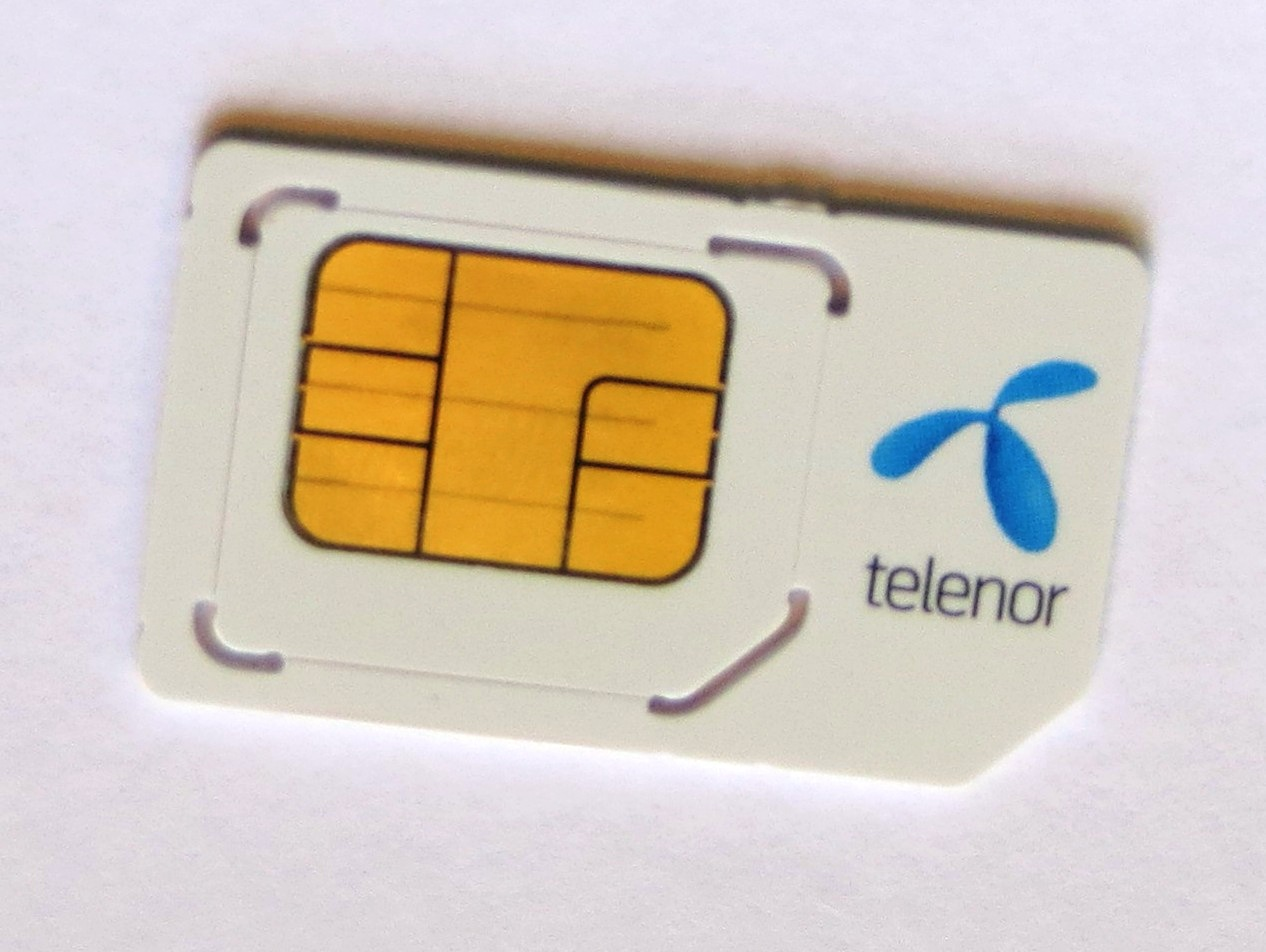
An example of a Telenor Myanmar SIM card

The Internet in Myanmar (Note: formerly known as Burma) has been available since 2000 when the first Internet connections were established. Beginning in September 2011, historically pervasive levels of Internet censorship in Burma were significantly reduced. Prior to September 2011, the military government worked aggressively to limit and control Internet access through software-based censorship, infrastructure and technical constraints, and laws and regulations with large fines and lengthy prison sentences for violators. In 2015, internet usage significantly increased to 12.6% with the introduction of faster mobile 3G internet by transnational telecommunication companies Telenor Myanmar and Ooredoo Myanmar, later joined by national Myanmar Post and Telecommunications(MPT). While the Internet situation in Myanmar has undergone change since its introduction in 2010 and reduction of censorship in 2011, laws such as the 2013 Telecommunications Law continue to restrict citizens from total freedom online. Despite restrictions, internet penetration continues to grow across the country.

Following the 2021 Myanmar coup d'état, internet access was shut off daily between the hours of 1:00 a.m. to 9:00 a.m. Social media networks such as Facebook, Twitter, Instagram, WhatsApp, Wikipedia and its related sister projects, international and local media, and the websites of anti-coup organizations (including the CRPH), were also banned by the ruling junta.

On 15 March 2021, the military completely shut off mobile internet access in Myanmar, and all internet access on 18 March.

Myanmar's top-level domain is '.mm'.

== Access and usage ==
=== Service providers ===
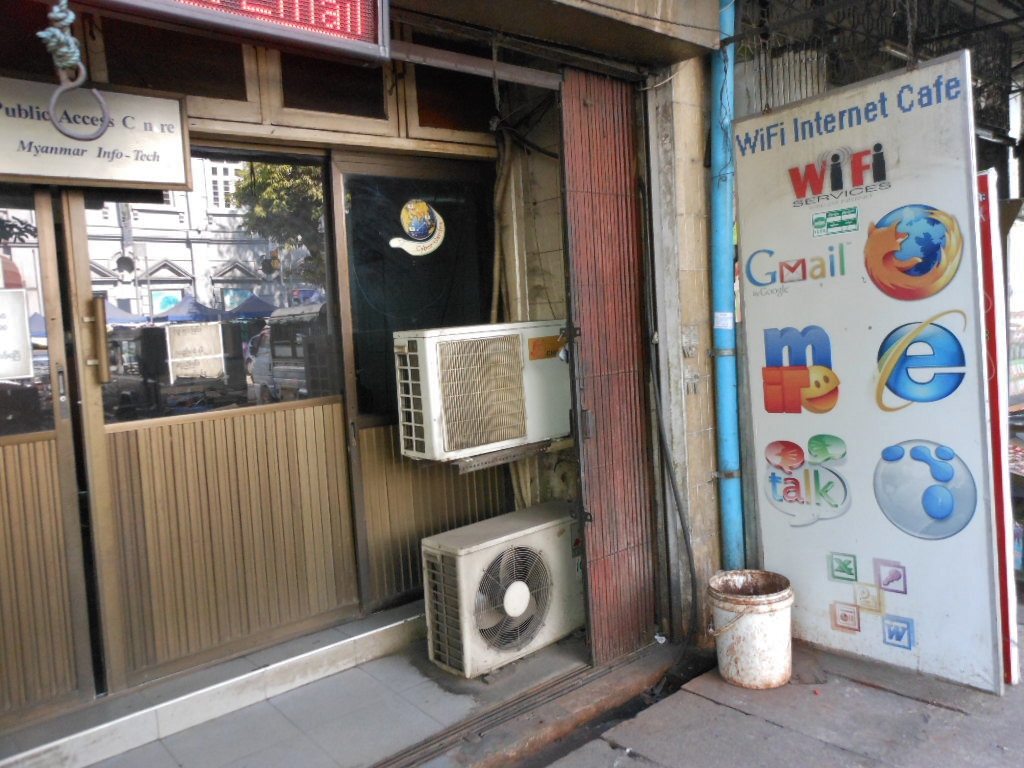
Internet cafe in Yangon (2013)

Yatanarpon Teleport, 5BB Broadband, satellite internet provider Skynet, the state-owned Myanmar Post and Telecommunication (MPT), WeLink Myanmar, Myanmar Net, Myanmar Speednet, AGB Communication, Fortune Broadband, Kinetic Myanmar Technology, Ooredoo Myanmar, Telenor Myanmar, Mytel, Uplink Myanmar and some others are the Internet service providers in Yangon and Mandalay.

Before democratization in 2011, Internet cafés were the most common method of accessing the Internet, as most were equipped with proxy servers in order to bypass government censorship. The popularity of Internet cafés declined with the emergence of improved telecommunication infrastructure following liberalization, which allowed mobile Internet to achieve widespread use. However, Internet cafés are still widely present, especially in Yangon and Mandalay, where they are used extensively for blogging.

The number of Internet service providers has enormously increased since 2015, and mobile data usage fees have also decreased to 1 MB per 5 Kyat (US$0.0035 estimated), with FTTH monthly fees starting from 20,000 Kyat (US$14.19 estimated) for 10 Mbit/s.

=== Internet in other towns and rural areas ===
Internet access for home use in areas outside of Yangon and Mandalay is only available through ADSL technology provided by MPT. However, its pricing is prohibitively expensive for most customers. In 2017, MPT's fixed-line phone (new installation) price for ADSL was Ks.3,25,000/- (US$240 estimated), including an initial setup fee of Ks.50,000/- (US$37 estimated) without a CPE. The annual fee is Ks.50,000/- (US$37 estimated), while the monthly fee for 512 kbit/s (lowest bandwidth) is Ks.17,000/- (US$13 estimated). 2.5 Mbit/s, the highest bandwidth available, is offered at Ks.80,000/- (US$60 estimated). FTTH Internet is unavailable in rural areas.

FTTH service providers are also available in some towns that are not included in Yangon and Mandalay regions.

=== Internet penetration ===
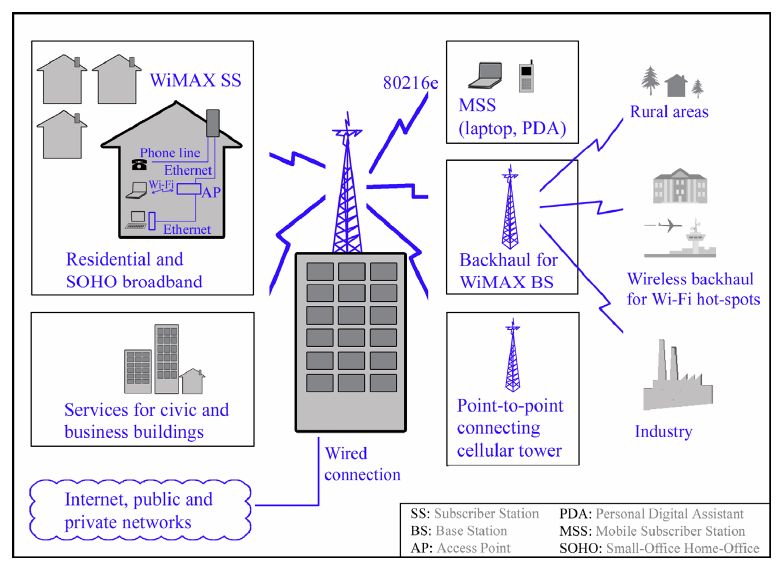
Example usages of WiMax

Myanmar has a very low Internet penetration rate due to government restrictions on pricing and deliberate lack of facilities and infrastructure. According to World Internet Stats statistics, Myanmar had over 534,930 Internet users (1.0% of the population) in June 2012, with the vast majority of users hailing from the two largest cities, Yangon and Mandalay. Although 42 cities across the country have access to the Internet, the number of users outside of Yangon and Mandalay is just over 10,000. In the same year, most of the country's 40,000 Internet connections were ADSL circuits, followed by dial-up, satellite terminal, and WiMax. MPT is also undertaking a trial of fibre-to-the-home in Mandalay, and plans to roll out a similar trial in Yangon. On 22 July 2015, the CEO of Telenor Myanmar announced that 55% of Telenor's 10 million mobile subscribers were data users, increasing the low estimate of internet users in Myanmar to at least 5.5 million. Internet World Statistics reported in Nov 2015 that penetration was 12.6%. As of 30 June 2017 Myanmar has 13,747,506 internet users, 25.1% population penetration, and 11,000,000 Facebook users.

=== Mobile phone usage ===
With the growth of Internet use in Myanmar and opening of telecommunications, the price of SIM cards has decreased from Ks.2,45,000/- (reported as US$250) in 2013 to Ks.1,542/- (reported as US$1.50) in 2014." While costs remain high across the country, ranking 148th out of 188 of countries on the United Nations Development Programme's Human Development Index that have 66.9% of the country making less than Ks.2,622/- per day ($2.00 USD), Mobile Media & Communication found that "Myanmar people are willing to pay for mobiles, with over 18.1 million active SIM cards."

=== VSAT service providers ===
Due to the geography of Myanmar, VSAT services have remained viable. While IPStar services had previously been offered, commercial VSAT service providers began emerging in 2016 and 2017.

=== Font conflicts ===
Union of Burma Boy Scouts motto using Zawgyi font

Amid the growth of Internet access across the country, ACM Computers & Society found that the Burmese-text font, Zawgyi, "may impede the digital potential of the country." Zawgyi, considered the most widely used font throughout Myanmar, is incompatible with Unicode, meaning that it does not use "an intelligent rendering engine to make sure each script element has one and only one code point." This may prevent websites displaying the Zawgyi font from being accessible to users from other countries or those displaying text using Unicode.

ACM Computers & Society also cautioned that typing certain ethnic languages of Myanmar with Zawgyi may be difficult, meaning that "Myanmar’s ethnic languages cannot be represented or co-exist with Burmese languages when the non-Unicode Zawgyi font is used."

Unicode began to spread throughout Myanmar thanks to initiatives such as including both Zawgyi and Unicode on Android versions 4.4 and newer. Lorian Leong of Mobile Media & Communication found that the lack of Unicode "influences users' access and dependency on others to help install such services, and creates constraints and limitations to content."

=== Blogging ===
An October 2010 survey found that blogging is the fastest growing type of Internet activity in Myanmar, with a 25 percent increase from 2009. A non-scientific survey taken in 2009 found that:

- Blogs focus on entertainment (14%), technology, computers, and the Internet (17%), books and literature (9%), news (6%), hobbies and travel (6%), politics (5%), and religion (4%), among other topics;
- 52 percent of Burmese bloggers write from Burma and 48 percent write from abroad;
- 72% of bloggers are men and 27% are women;
- 77% of bloggers are single and 14% are married;
- 35 percent of bloggers are 26 to 30 years old and 29 percent are 21 to 25 years old;
- 80 percent blog in Burmese, 8 percent blog in English, 10 percent blog in both languages, and the rest use ethnic minority languages such as Kachin, Karen, and Chin.

=== Social media ===
According to the Development Institute of the Russian Federation, Myanmar "still [has] social media penetration levels below 10%." Despite this, internet and social media usage is still rising and influential, with Facebook usage among a variety of people in Myanmar, including farmers. While social media usage spreads, people using platforms such as Facebook use it for controversially both good and bad reasons.

According to Reuters, "U.N. human rights experts investigating a possible genocide in Myanmar said [...] that Facebook had played a role in spreading hate speech there." The Rohingya genocide was found to be affected by Facebook, as Reuters found that while Facebook was broadly "used to convey public messages", it also allowed ultra-nationalist Buddhist groups to incite violence and "hatred against the Rohingya or other ethnic minorities."

With the growth of social media and its capability to spread both news and opinionated information, some information managers in Myanmar are learning about the potential of social media through a workshop run by UNESCO, the Myanmar Information Management Unit, and the ICT4Peace Foundation, all of which discuss big data and trends. According to UNESCO, the workshop "gave participants a chance to learn about social media and data trends, the platforms available, their characteristics, and how to effectively leverage these for crisis information management" in addition to advising the managers about the use of social media in issues such as hate speech or election violence.

== Censorship ==
As Myanmar gradually expands its technologies and Internet access, censorship remains a problem, with Freedom House in its 2017 Myanmar country profile stating that "conditions for the media in Myanmar have improved significantly since the country began its ongoing transition from military dictatorship toward electoral democracy. However, the government maintains tight control over the media sector through the use of harsh defamation and other laws." Since the introduction of the Internet to the country, Myanmar has faced criticism from several organizations for its actions regarding censorship, some of which are listed below:

- Listed as selective in the political and Internet tools areas, as substantial in social, and with no evidence of filtering in conflict/security by the OpenNet Initiative in August 2012.
- Listed as an Internet enemy by Reporters Without Borders (RWB) in 2011.
- Listed as not free for both net freedom and press freedom according to Freedom House in 2017.

=== History ===
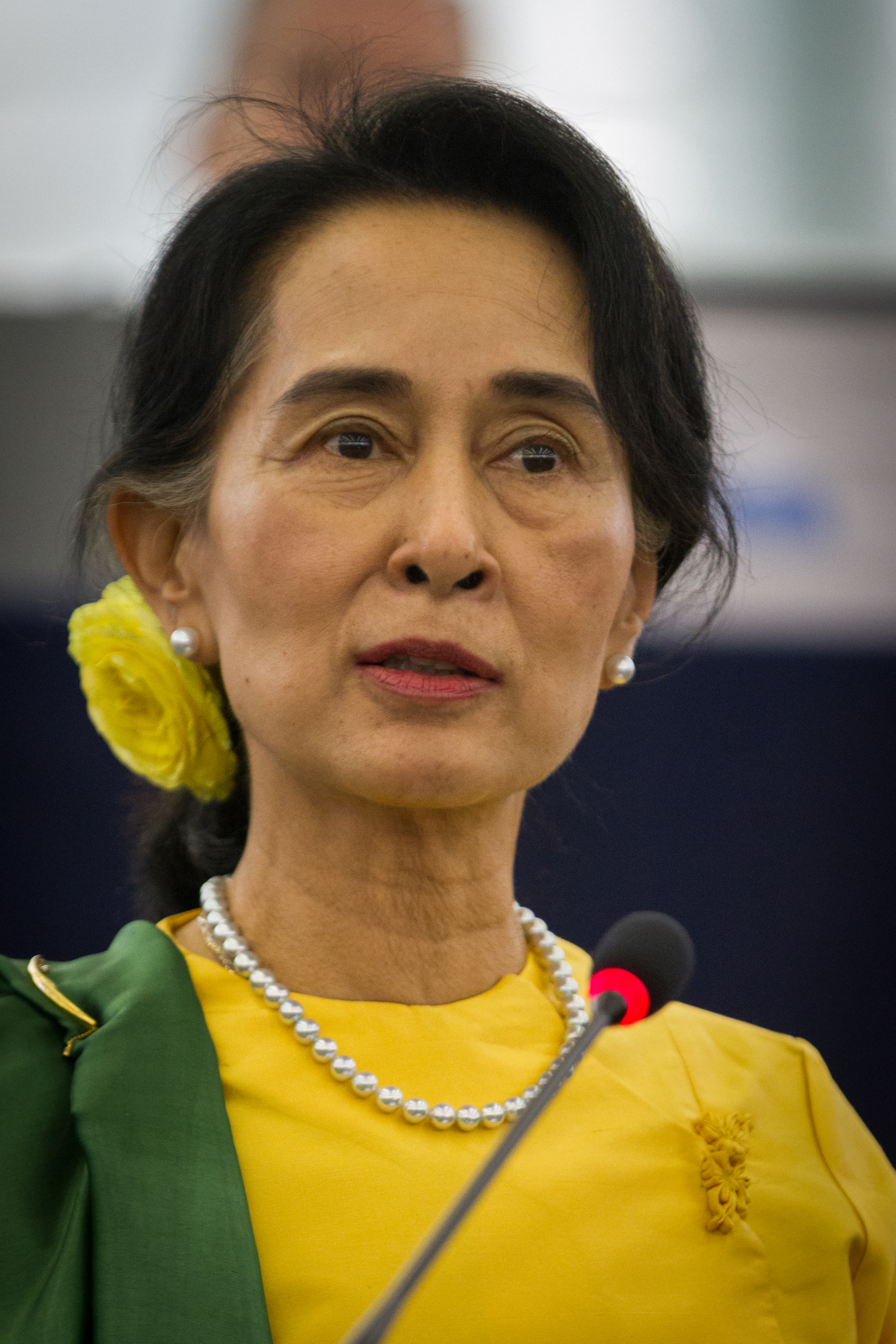
Former State Counsellor Aung San Suu Kyi

Before September 2011, the government used a wide range of methods to restrict Internet freedom, including legal and regulatory barriers, infrastructural and technical constraints, and coercive measures such as intimidation and lengthy prison sentences. Although the authorities lacked the capacity to pervasively enforce all restrictions, the impact of their sporadic implementation and the ensuing impact was profound. While information circulating on the Internet is still closely monitored, reforms by the Burmese regime that began in 2011 resulted in information being more freely circulated.

Internet censorship in Myanmar was classified as pervasive in the political area and as substantial in social, conflict/security, and Internet tools areas by the OpenNet Initiative in December 2010. In 2012, Myanmar was listed as an "Internet enemy" by Reporters Without Borders. Myanmar was initially designated as "Not Free" in Freedom House's Freedom on the Net 2011 report, although by 2014, the country's status was revised to "Partly Free".

Previously, Myanmar utilised a national intranet, a network protocol serving as a closed alternative to the global Internet, in order to limit the flow of unwanted information in and out of the country.

The Internet infrastructure was also controlled through total shutdowns and temporary reductions in bandwidth. During the 2007 street protests, the junta completely shut down Internet connectivity from 29 September to 4 October. State-controlled ISPs occasionally applied bandwidth caps to prevent the sharing of video and image files, particularly during politically sensitive events, such as the November 2010 elections.

Prior to September 2011, Myanmar banned the websites and blogs of political opposition groups, sites relating to human rights, and pro-democracy organisations. The term "Myanmar Wide Web (MWW)" is a pejorative name for the portion of the World Wide Web that is accessible from Myanmar. Many sites containing keywords or phrases that were considered suspicious, such as "Burma", "drugs", "military government", "democracy", "student movement", "8888" (a reference to a protest movement that began on 8 August 1988), and "human rights" were shut down, with some remaining blocked. Access to Yahoo! Mail, MSN Mail, Gmail, the video-sharing site YouTube, the messaging feature of the social networking site Facebook, Google's Blogger service, and the microblogging service Twitter were sporadically blocked. However, Voice over Internet Protocol (VoIP) systems, including Skype, were and are available. Fortinet, a California-based company, provides the government of Myanmar with software that limits the material accessible by citizens online, especially e-mail service providers and pornographic websites.

Once the leadership of the country transferred to the National League for Democracy (NLD) and Aung San Suu Kyi in 2016, the speed of the Internet remained generally stagnant, with slight improvements in regard to more phone shops and WiFi in bigger cities,, but the freedom of Internet use slowed down. A few years prior in 2013, the Telecommunications Law included legislation that was seen as restrictive to free speech, as seen through the incarceration of 38 people since the NLD came to power who were charged with violating the law through online defamation. Ever since its enactment in 2013, people have criticized the law for being used to silence anyone critical of the government, and therefore making freedom of speech on the Internet difficult. According to Freedom House, the tense environment with the Rohingya refugee crisis starting in 2015 in the Rakhine state has created more concern for the future of freedom of speech online. Once Aung San Suu Kyi and the NLD came into power in 2016, 17 journalists were incarcerated under the Telecommunications Law. Despite restrictions, the number of Internet users in Myanmar continues to grow, albeit with the majority relying upon low bandwidth. According to World Bank, "mobile and internet penetration has increased significantly from less than 20% and 10% in 2014, to 60% and 25% respectively" as of October 2017.

Many political prisoners in Myanmar were charged under the aforementioned laws. However, in the second half of 2011, as part of a larger series of amnesties, the military regime released a number of journalists and bloggers.

- Reporters Without Borders counted at least 15 journalists and three internet activists in detention in 2011;
- Nay Phone Latt, a blogger and owner of three cybercafes, was released in January 2012 after being sentenced to 20 years and six months in prison in November 2008 for posting a cartoon of General Than Shwe, Chairman of the State Peace and Development Council from 1992 to 2011;
- Members of the 88 Generation Students Group, Htay Kywe, Min Ko Naing, Ko Jimmy, Nilar Thein, Mie Mie, and nine others, were convicted on 11 November 2008 of four counts of "illegally using electronic media" and one count of "forming an illegal organization" and sentenced to 65 years in prison apiece, while the group's photographer, Zaw Htet Ko Ko, and other members were given sentences ranging from three to eleven years; Min Ko Naing has since been released. Other members of the group were released on 13 January 2012, as part of a mass presidential pardon for political activists.
- Freelance reporter Hla Hla Win was released in 2011 after being arrested in September 2009 and given a 27-year prison term, including 20 years for violating the Electronic Transactions Law. Her associate, Myint Naing, arrested at the same time, was also released after receiving a 32-year sentence;
- Blogger Win Zaw Naing was released in January 2012 after being arrested in November 2009 and facing up to 15 years in prison for posting pictures and reports about the September 2007 protests;
- A former military officer and a foreign affairs official were sentenced to death in 2010, and another foreign affairs official was sentenced to 15 years in prison, for leaking information and photographs about military tunnels and a general's trip to North Korea, there are conflicting reports that the death sentences were reduced to life or to 32 years in 2012;
- Journalist Ngwe Soe Lin was released in late 2011 after being arrested at a cybercafe in Yangon, was sentenced to 13 years in prison in January 2010 for working for an exile media outlet;
- Activist Than Myint Aung was released in January 2012 after receiving a 10-year prison sentence in July 2010 for violating the Electronic Transactions Law by using the Internet to disseminate information that was "detrimental to the security of the state"; and
- Photographer Sithu Zeya was granted a conditional release after being sentenced to eight years in prison in December 2010 for taking pictures in the aftermath of an April 2010 bomb blast in Yangon and for his affiliation with an exiled media outlet.

=== Reforms in the early 2010s ===
Following decades of military rule, Burma has undergone a series of significant political and economic reforms since the elections in November 2010. March 2011 saw the end of formal military rule in the country, with reformist Thein Sein becoming the country's first civilian president in half a century. While by-elections held in April 2012 included numerous reports of fraud, the opposition party National League for Democracy, including leader and Nobel laureate Aung San Suu Kyi, won seats after contesting their first elections since 1991. From 2011 to 2012, hundreds of political prisoners were released as legislative changes re-established labour rights in the country.

Reforms have also extended to the country's strict information control regime. Beginning in September 2011, the historically pervasive levels of Internet censorship were significantly reduced. International news sites, including Voice of America, BBC, and Radio Free Asia, long blocked by Burmese censors, became accessible. A number of previously censored independent Burma-focused news sites which had been highly critical of the ruling regime, such as the Democratic Voice of Burma and Irrawaddy, were also made accessible. Following the reduction in online censorship, the head of Burma's press censorship department described such censorship as "not in harmony with democratic practices" and a practice that "should be abolished in the near future."

In August 2012, the Burmese Press Scrutiny and Registration Department announced that all pre-publication censorship of the press was to be discontinued, such that articles dealing with religion and politics would no longer require review by the government before publication. Restrictions on content deemed harmful to state security, however, remained in place. Pornography was still widely blocked, as was content relating to alcohol and drugs, gambling websites, online dating sites, sex education, gay and lesbian content, and web censorship circumvention tools. In 2012, almost all of the previously blocked websites of opposition political parties, critical political content, and independent news sites were accessible, with only 5 of 541 tested URLs categorised as political content blocked.

In September 2012, in a speech to the United Nations General Assembly, Burmese president Thein Sein described the country as having taken "irreversible steps" towards democracy, a speech broadcast on state television for the first time.

As significant as they are, the impact of these reforms may be less than expected considering only 0.3 percent of Burma's population has Web access, and outside of Burma's largest city, Yangon, few can read English.

=== Laws ===
Laws regulating the Internet include the Computer Science Development Law (1996), the Wide Area Network Order (2002), the Electronic Transactions Law (2004), and the Printers and Publishers Registration Act (1962), which regulates the media. These laws and associated regulations are broadly worded and open to arbitrary or selective interpretation and enforcement. The Electronic Transactions Law covers "any act detrimental to" and specifically "receiving or sending and distributing any information relating to" state security, law and order, community peace and tranquility, national solidarity, the national economy, or national culture. Violators face fines and prison terms of 7 to 15 years. The importing and use of a modem without official permission is banned, with penalties for violations of up to 15 years in prison. While harsh prison terms and selective enforcement encourages self-censorship, expression in online environments, such as comment features, remains both relatively free and anonymous.

These laws are still in place, and authorities had promised to adopt a media law that will put an end to censorship back in 2012 in addition to revising or repealing the Electronic Act and emergency rule. In January 2013, the new media law was not put in place and there was some concern that the country would backslide and return to the repressive tendencies of the past, which ended up happening later on in the year with the 2013 Telecommunications Law, which has been considered a breach of freedom of speech online. While the government of Myanmar amended the 2013 law slightly in August 2017, including an amendment that "permits judges to release people on bail, allows only those directly affected, or with permission from those directly affected, by the offense to press charges, and reduces the maximum prison sentence to two years” for crimes under article 66 of the law, the government did not change anything about article 66(d), which is considered a "highly controversial clause that restricts freedom of speech."

=== Censorship circumvention ===
The use of Internet censorship circumvention methods was officially banned by the military government; Myanmar ISPs blocked many bypass and proxy websites, but were unable to block all circumvention methods. With the removal of the blocking of websites after 2012, the demand for proxies was reduced, and therefore, the need to block them was also removed. Cybercafes were required by law to keep records of their customers' activities and provide police access to their records upon request. However, many cafes do not systematically enforce such monitoring, often assisting their users in circumventing censorship instead. In response, the government increased surprise inspections of cybercafes, and cafes posted signs warning users not to visit certain websites. Licensing law instructed cybercafes to install CCTV cameras and assign at least four security staff to monitor users.

=== Re-censorship after the 2021 coup ===
After the 2021 military coup on 1 February, internet censorship saw a significant re-emergence. The State Administration Council shut down all telecommunications in the late midnight of 31 January. After a few days, social media, including Facebook, Twitter, Wikipedia, Spotify, Instagram, and WhatsApp, were banned following their usage by anti-coup protestors. Websites are available and accessible in Myanmar including YouTube, Miniclip, Scratch, etc. The junta also arrested social influencers and others who wrote articles against the coup. Most were arrested under Act 505 (a), which carries a prison sentence of 3 years. Most websites of news agencies and social media that contained content denouncing the coup were blocked. Wikipedia and its sister projects were also banned on 19 February. On 6 and 7 February, the Internet experienced a blackout with minor shutdowns in several regions. However, telecommunications company Mytel, partly owned by the military, was seemingly not affected by the shutdowns. From 15 February, internet curfews were initiated seemingly without reason, lasting daily from 1:00 a.m. to 9:00 a.m. On 15 March, nationwide mobile Internet was shut down and only fibre to the home (FTTH) services remained unaffected.

After increased internet service provider (ISP) blocking of VPNs in Myanmar, Starlink usage surged, despite the service being unauthorized under Myanmar's Telecommunications Law. Resistance groups began implementing Starlink services in mid-2023, and the Myanmar Internet Project estimates that over 3,000 smuggled Starlink dishes were active in 2025. Starlink is considered the only reliable source of unrestricted internet in Myanmar, leading to inflated prices, up to seven times higher than the market rate. This price increase shifted the primary users from individuals to internet cafes, rebel groups, and increasingly, cyber scam operations. Starlink devices became crucial for these cybercrime syndicates, especially after Thailand severed internet connections to Myanmar scam centres.

== See also ==
- Human rights in Myanmar
- Mass media in Myanmar
- Digital divide by continent, area and country § Myanmar
