= U Gambira =

Burmese monk

- ရှင်ဂမ္ဘီရ
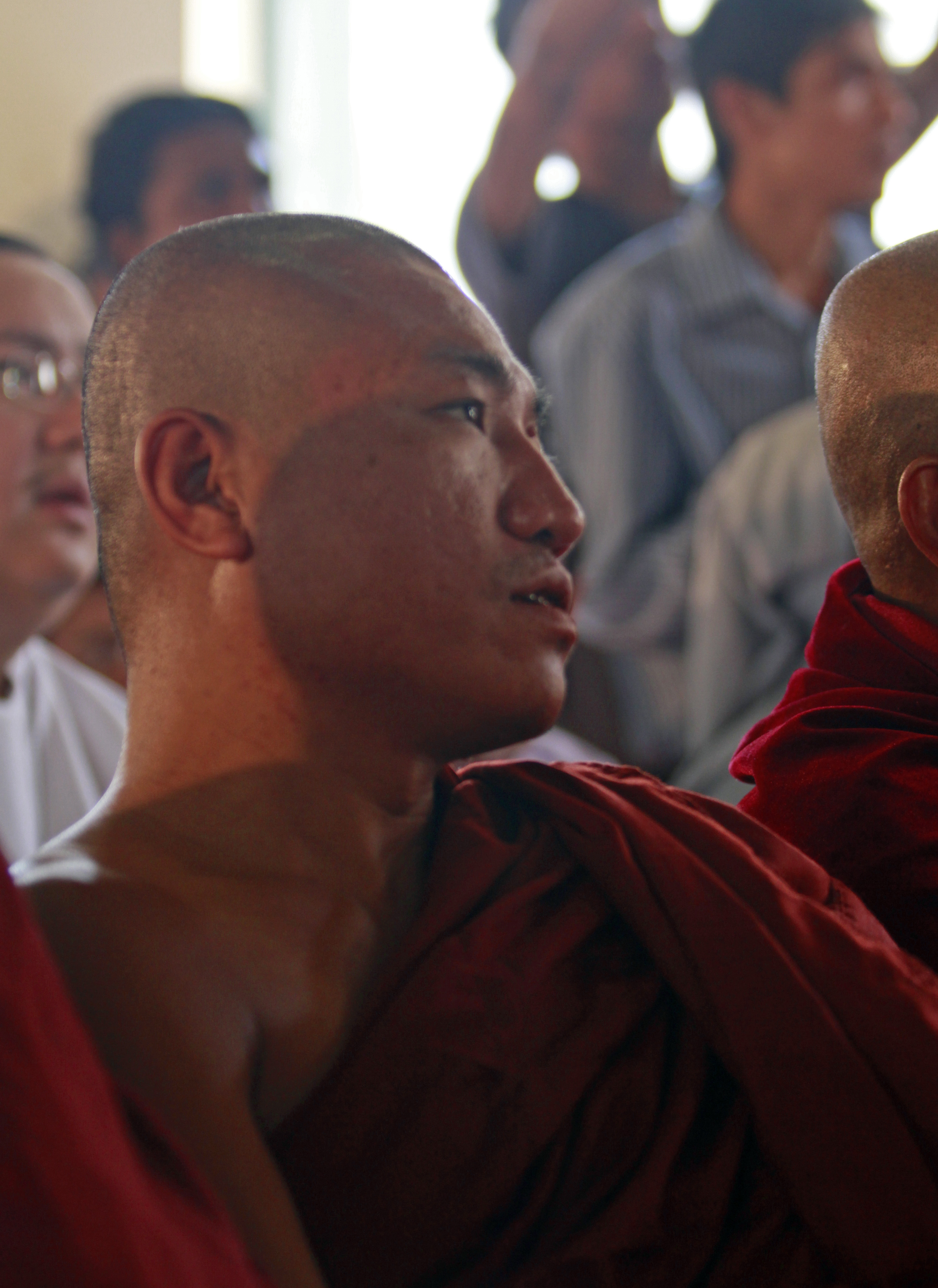
- U Gambira in 2012
- Born: Nyi Nyi Lwin (ညီညီလွင်); 19 June 1979 (age 47); Kaingle village, Pauk Township, Magway Division, Burma
- Other names: Candobhāsa (စန္ဒောဘာသ), also spelt Sandawbatha
- Occupations: former Buddhist monk, activist
- Known for: Leading the 2007 Saffron Revolution
- Spouse: Marie Siochana
- Parent(s): U Min Lwin, Daw Yay

Nyi Nyi Lwin (Burmese: ညီညီလွင်, MLCTS: Nyi Nyi Lwang; born 19 June 1979), more widely known by his monastic name U Gambira (Burmese: ရှင်ဂမ္ဘီရ), (Note: Gambira was born Nyi Nyi Lwin. He is also known as Ashin Gambira, Shin Gambira, and by his Dharma name U Sandawbartha.) is a former Buddhist monk, activist and a leader of the All-Burma Monks' Alliance, a group which helped lead the 2007 protests against Burma's military government. Following the protests, he went into hiding and published two editorials critical of the Burmese government in The Washington Post and The Guardian on 4 November 2007. He was arrested the same day.

In November 2008, he was sentenced to 68 years in prison, including 12 years hard labour; the sentence was reduced to 65 years on appeal. Gambira reportedly protested his imprisonment by organising chanting with other imprisoned monks, boycotting his trial, and going on hunger strike. Human rights groups including Amnesty International and Human Rights Watch also protested his imprisonment.

Gambira was released during a mass pardon of prisoners on 13 January 2012 as part of the 2011–2012 Burmese political reforms. He ceased to be a monk in April 2012, stating that he had been unable to find a monastery to join due to his status as a former prisoner. He was re-arrested at least three times in 2012.

== Early life ==
Gambira started attending school at age five, but the 1988 pro-democracy protests caused school closings that interrupted Gambira's schooling. According to the Assistance Association for Political Prisoners (AAPP), he ran away from home at age 12 and was recruited as a child soldier by a military unit in Yangon. Once his brother and his friend located him, they removed him from the unit and returned with him to their home in Pauk Township. When the authorities came to investigate, Gambira's parents enrolled him in a local monastery to protect him from arrest or conscription into further military service.

== 2007 protests and aftermath ==
Gambira first became well known in August 2007 during widespread protests against the State Peace and Development Council (SPDC), the military government which had ruled the country since suppressing the previous uprising in 1988. The protests were sparked when the SPDC cut fuel subsidies without warning, causing fuel and other commodity prices to suddenly rise.

The city's Buddhist monks took on a leadership role in these demonstrations, forming the All-Burma Monks' Alliance and lending the uprising its nickname of "the Saffron Revolution", after the colour of the monks' robes. Gambira, then a 29-year-old monk, became one of the new organisation's leaders. He later stated that the monks had been planning an uprising since 2003 or 2004. Because monks are revered in Burma's Buddhist-majority society, the government at first appeared reluctant to suppress their demonstrations.

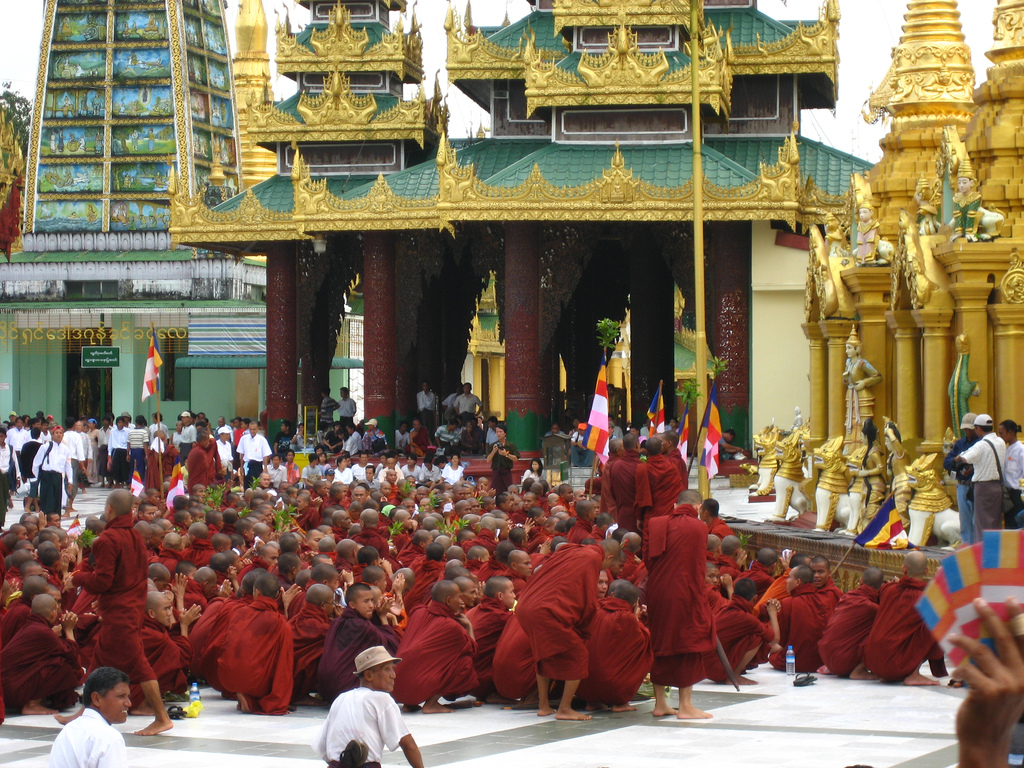
"Saffron Revolution" protest, September 2007

On 24 September 2007, the All-Burma Monks' Alliance released a statement condemning the military government: "In order to banish the common enemy evil regime from Burmese soil forever, united masses of people need to join hands with the united clergy forces ... We pronounce the evil military despotism, which is impoverishing and pauperizing our people of all walks, including the clergy, as the common enemy of all our citizens." During the demonstrations, Gambira split his time between Mandalay and Yangon, moving between the two cities to avoid arrest.

After government forces violently broke up the protests, killing some monks and other protesters, Gambira went into hiding. His brother Aung Kyaw Kyaw was arrested on 17 October, in what the AAPP called an attempt by the government to force Gambira out of hiding. On 4 November, Gambira published editorials in The Washington Post and The Guardian calling for the international community to continue sanctions against Burma's leadership, for Russia and China to cease supporting the SPDC on the United Nations Security Council, and for Burma's people to continue to peacefully protest against the military rulers. "The regime's use of mass arrests, murder, torture and imprisonment has failed to extinguish our desire for the freedom that was stolen from us so many years ago. We have taken their best punch", he wrote in the Post. The day that the editorials appeared, Gambira was arrested in Sagaing Region. His father was arrested as well and detained in Mandalay prison for a month.

== Imprisonment ==
Gambira stated after his release that authorities had beaten him and deprived him of sleep during his imprisonment, and Human Rights Watch reported that he was "badly tortured" and stripped of his monk's robes. (Note: Burmese monks are highly respected in Burmese society, and their robes are one of the most distinctive outward signs of this status.)

In April 2008, Gambira's sister reported that he was leading a mettā chanting campaign among other imprisoned monks of Insein Prison to protest against their being issued "layperson" identification cards for the upcoming constitutional referendum. He was subsequently placed in solitary confinement. In speaking later of conditions in the prison, Gambira stated that he had malaria for seven of his eight months there. Tomas Ojea Quintana, the United Nations Special Rapporteur on Human Rights for Burma, visited Gambira and four other political prisoners at Insein in August.

Gambira faced a total of sixteen charges for his role in the protests, including membership in an unlawful association and illegal movement across borders. In October 2008, Gambira's lawyer, Aung Thein, resigned from his case, saying that the military government would not allow him the materials to prepare an adequate defence. On one occasion, Gambira refused to appear in court himself, stating that the trial of a forcibly disrobed monk was disrespectful to Buddhism.

Between November 18 and November 21, Gambira was sentenced to 68 years in prison, at least 12 years of which would be hard labour. In early 2009, five years were taken off his total sentence, reducing it to 63 years. Both Human Rights Watch and Amnesty International protested his sentence, calling for his immediate release. Aung Ko Ko Lwin, Gambira's brother who had sheltered him from authorities, was sentenced to twenty years in prison, and Moe Htet Hlyan, Gambira's brother-in-law, was also imprisoned. Aung Ko Ko Lwin and Moe Htet Hlyan were sent to Arakan State and Mon State, respectively, to serve their sentences.

Gambira was transferred to a labour camp in Sagaing Region. When his mother visited him in early 2009, she reported that he was on hunger strike, refusing to eat in protest of the conditions of his confinement. Amnesty International reported that he had nervous tension and was in generally ill health. On 31 October 2011, the organisation issued an "urgent action" identifying Gambira as a prisoner of conscience and stating that he was being denied hospitalisation necessary to treat complications from being tortured at Hkamti prison in April 2009. Democratic Voice of Burma reported that Gambira was being regularly beaten by guards during the same period and was having seizures as a result.

During his imprisonment, Gambira won the Bindmans Law and Campaigning Award in absentia at the 2008 Index on Censorship Freedom of Expression Awards. The prize recognises "lawyers and campaigners who have fought repression or who have struggled to change political climates and perceptions, especially those who have used or established legal means to fight injustice in the field of freedom of expression", and is sponsored by Bindmans LLP. Also in 2008, the official website of Morbegno, Italy announced that Gambira had been made an honorary citizen of the town.

== 2012 release and re-arrests ==
On 13 January 2012, Gambira was released in a mass presidential pardon of political prisoners that also included 88 Generation activists Min Ko Naing, Htay Kywe, and Nilar Thein, as well as Shan leader Khun Htun Oo. Gambira stated in an interview that his imprisonment had left him with depression, frequent headaches, and failing memory; however, he said he had difficulty finding a doctor willing to treat him, for fear that it would draw government reprisals. He attempted to leave the country for treatment, but could not get the necessary paperwork. Gambira told reporters that his organisation would continue to boycott the government despite the amnesty: "The government has transformed its external appearance into a civilian one but their efforts to implement democracy are still rather weak, while many cases of human rights violations continue".

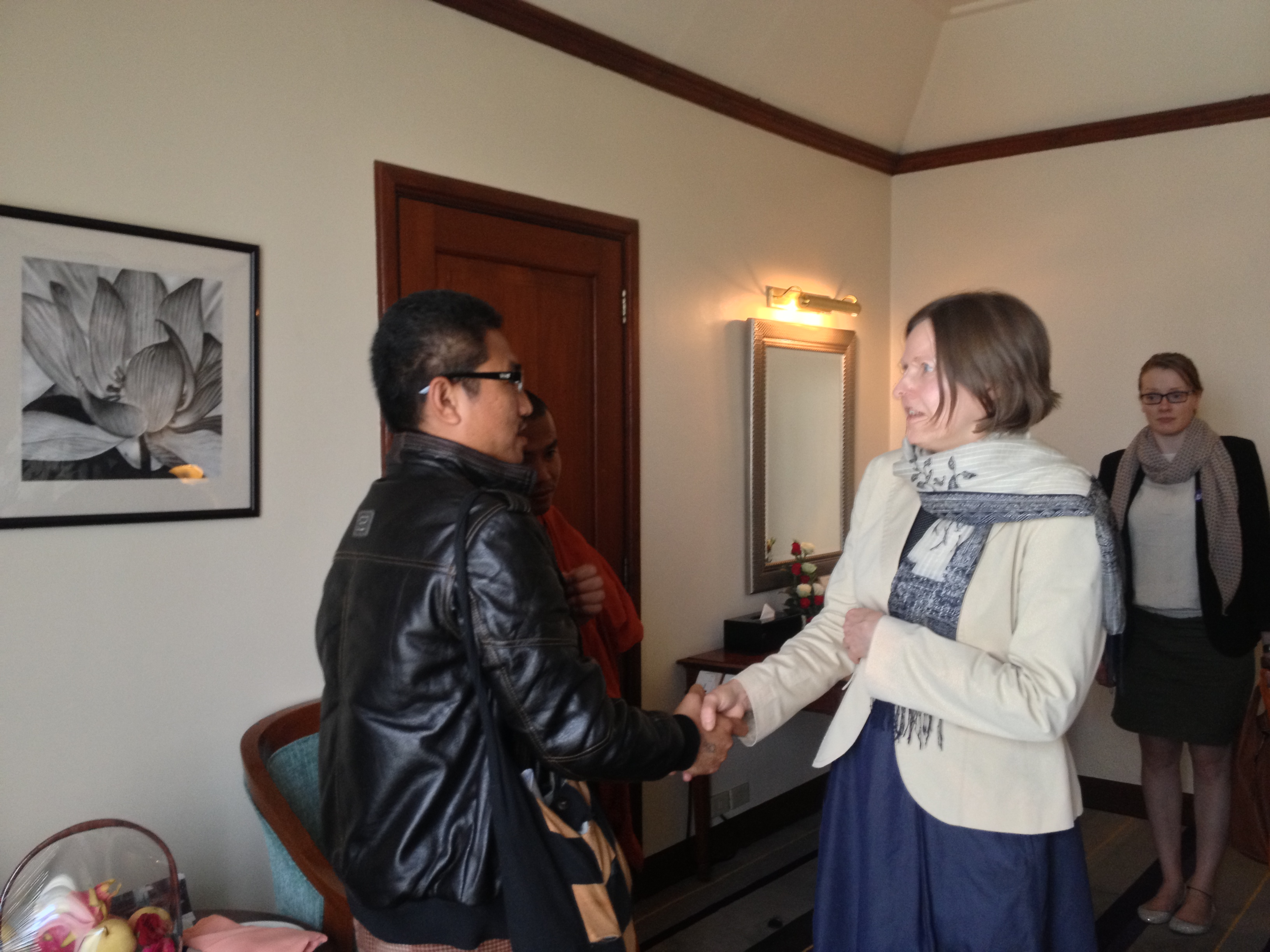
Gambira greets Finnish International Development Minister Heidi Hautala in Yangon, Burma on 22 January 2013

After breaking into and reopening several monasteries closed during the Saffron Revolution, Gambira was rearrested on 10 February during a 2 a.m. raid, and was released after a night in jail. Authorities announced that he was undergoing investigation for illegally squatting at the Maggin Monastery in Yangon's Thingangyun Township without officially registering with the Ministry of Religious Affairs after his release, and for breaking and entering the Sasana Theikpan and Sasana Gonyi Monasteries in Bahan Township.

On 6 March 2012, he was once again detained and interrogated over a recent visit he had made to Kachin State, where local ethnic minority groups were engaged in guerrilla warfare against the government. He was released two days later. The following month, he was forced to formally cease to be a monk after several monasteries refused him membership, which he said was due to their fear of government reprisals if they were to allow him to enter. He then returned to his birth name of Nyi Nyi Lwin.

In November 2012, Gambira was seated in the front row for a speech by visiting US President Barack Obama, who cautiously praised seeming democratic reforms including the release of political prisoners like Gambira. A few weeks after the speech, authorities arrested Gambira again and sent him to Insein prison. The US Embassy released a statement on the arrest, saying, "We're monitoring reports of U Gambira's detention. We urged the government of Burma to be fully transparent and follow due process of law". Gambira's family believed that he had been arrested to prevent him from joining protests by a group of monks against a copper mining project. On 11 December, Gambira was released on a bail of 4 million kyat (US$4,686).

On 19 January 2016, he was arrested in Mandalay on a politically motivated charge of illegal border crossing. He was sentenced without evidence to 6 months in prison. The Human Rights Council Working Group on Arbitrary Detention said that the deprivation of liberty of Gambira was arbitrary, being in contravention with Articles 10 and 13 of the Universal Declaration of Human Rights; it falls within category II of the categories applicable to the consideration of the cases submitted to the Working Group. He was released on 1 July 2016.

== Personal life ==
Gambira, who disrobed in 2012, was living in Thailand after being re-arrested several times in 2012 and 2016. He married Marie Siochana, an Australian citizen in 2013. On 8 March 2019, Australia granted him asylum. His biography, NARAKA: The U Gambira Story, written by Marie, was published in 2020.

== Health problems ==
He has been recovering from serious physical and mental health issues, including complex post-traumatic stress disorder.
