= 2011–2015 Myanmar political reforms =

Liberal reforms by the military-backed government

The 2011–2015 Myanmar political reforms were a series of political, economic and administrative reforms in Myanmar undertaken by the military-backed government. These reforms include the release of pro-democracy leader Aung San Suu Kyi from house arrest and subsequent dialogues with her, establishment of the National Human Rights Commission, general amnesties of more than 200 political prisoners, institution of new labour laws that allow labour unions and strikes, relaxation of press censorship, and regulations of currency practices. As a consequence of the reforms, ASEAN approved Myanmar's bid for the chairmanship in 2014. United States Secretary of State Hillary Clinton visited Myanmar on 1 December 2011, to encourage further progress; it was the first visit by a Secretary of State in more than fifty years. United States President Barack Obama visited one year later, becoming the first US president to visit the country.

Aung San Suu Kyi's party, the National League for Democracy, participated in by-elections held on 1 April 2012 after the government abolished laws that led to the NLD's boycott of the 2010 general election. She led the NLD in winning the by-elections in a landslide, winning 41 out of 44 of the contested seats, with Aung San Suu Kyi herself winning a seat representing Kawhmu Constituency in the lower house of the Myanmar Parliament. However, uncertainties existed as some other political prisoners have not been released and clashes between Myanmar troops and local insurgent groups continued. In 2021, the reforms were rolled back in the aftermath of the 2021 Myanmar coup d'état and outbreak of civil war.

== Background ==
Burma was under military rule from 1962 to 2010. In 2008, the ruling Junta, State Peace and Development Council, announced the new constitution as a part of roadmap to democracy. The constitution, which reserves 25% of the Hluttaw legislature's seats for military, is seen by the opposition as a tool for continuing military control of the country. A constitution referendum was held in 2008 amid Cyclone Nargis. Observers criticised the referendum for voter intimidation, electoral fraud and advance voting. Nevertheless, on 15 May 2008, the junta announced that the constitution had been approved by 92.4% of voters, claiming a 99% turnout in the two-thirds of the region that had held the vote.

An election was held in 2010. The military backed Union Solidarity and Development Party declared victory. The United Nations and Western countries expressed concerns about the conduct of the elections.

== Reforms ==
Aung San Suu Kyi appears on front pages after decades of censorship.

Nevertheless, the government has embarked reforms toward liberal democracy, mixed economy, and reconciliation, although the motives of such reforms are still debated.

=== Corruption ===
In March 2012, the Pyidaungsu Hluttaw passed a law that will increase the wages of all public sector employees, including soldiers, an additional cost-of-living allowance of 30,000 kyat (US$38), along with a daily wage increase of 1,100 to 2,100 kyat ($1.40–$2.70) for full-time employees, purportedly to tackle corruption in the government. The law will be effective 1 April 2012, when the 2012 Burmese by-elections take place.

On 12 March 2012, The Voice, a weekly news journal published an article that highlighted 6 ministries: the Ministry of Information, Ministry of Mines, Ministry of Agriculture and Irrigation, Ministry of Industry 1 and Ministry of Industry 2, as misusing funds and misstating finances, based on internal parliamentary audit reports. Two days later, the Ministry of Mines announced that it would file a lawsuit against the journal.

=== Political reforms ===
The pro-democracy leader, Aung San Suu Kyi was released from house arrest on 13 November 2010. After her release, she held a series of dialogues with President Thein Sein and Minister Aung Kyi. Although the discussions were not publicised, the state media reported that "the two sides have agreed to set aside the differences and work together in matters of common interests that will really benefit the country and the people" Aung San Suu Kyi's ability to travel freely throughout the country is seen as an improvement compared to her trips in 2003 which met with a government sponsored massacre.

Aung San Suu Kyi's party, National League for Democracy boycotted the 2010 election. The election law enacted by the SPDC did not allow ex-prisoners to become members of registered political parties. If NLD decided to register, it would have to expel its members who were imprisoned. But in November, the government erased the clause in a parliamentary section. After the amendments, NLD leaders have unanimously decided to register for the by-election.

=== Censorship ===
The government has relaxed press and internet censorship laws, for example allowing photographs of Aung San Suu Kyi to be published on the front page of local newspapers. Tint Swe, the head of the country's censorship authority, the Press Scrutiny and Registration Division, said that censorship is incompatible with democratic practices and should be abolished. A presidential adviser has indicated that press censorship will be abolished in 2012 under new media legislation. In September 2011, several banned websites including YouTube, Democratic Voice of Burma and Voice of America have been unblocked.

In January 2012, the Ministry of Information announced that it had forwarded a draft of a new media and press law to the Attorney General's Office for review. The draft law, which will need to be approved by the Pyidaungsu Hluttaw (National Parliament), borrows some language from similar laws in Cambodia, Indonesia and Vietnam. The draft law, which is adapted from the 1962 Printers and Publishers Registration Law, will not be submitted during the second parliamentary session.

In March 2012, Minister of Information, Kyaw Hsan, said that the country was undergoing a 3-step process in reforming the media regulation: (1) relaxation of regulations to allow individual publications to exercise self-censorship and accountability, (2) promulgation of a new print media law, (3) regulation of print media through the new print media law. On a similar note, Yi Htut, the Information and Public Relations Division's Director-General stated that the new media law would avoid the extremes of the past, outline journalists' rights and responsibilities and that he was in consultation with UNESCO experts with regard to the new law.

=== Human rights ===
The government has convened an independent National Human Rights Commission (NHRC) consisting of 15 retired bureaucrats and academics. Analysts have questioned the panel's will and ability to challenge the government, but the commission has challenged the President's claims that there are no political prisoners in Myanmar, calling for all political prisoners' release.

Two general amnesties were held in 2011 releasing between 10,000 and 40,000 prisoners, although only about 300 of them are considered political prisoners by monitor groups such as the Assistance Association for Political Prisoners (AAPP). After the second general amnesty, some prominent prisoners of conscience such as comedian Zarganar have been released, while others such as 8888 Uprising leader Min Ko Naing remained in prison. The government also approved the NHRC's suggestion to relocate political prisoners so that their family members can easily contact them. There are varying definitions of "political prisoner", but Amnesty International and the NLD consider Myanmar to have 600 political prisoners. On 13 January 2012, another amnesty was announced, freeing 88 Generation Student Group activists Min Ko Naing, Htay Kywe, Ko Ko Gyi, Nilar Thein, Mie Mie, and Mya Aye, as well as Shan leader Khun Htun Oo, Saffron Revolution leader U Gambira, former prime minister Khin Nyunt, blogger Nay Phone Latt, and a number of imprisoned Democratic Voice of Burma reporters. As of March 2012, various organisations have identified upwards of 619 remaining political prisoners (AAP has identified 413) in jail. As of April 2013, according to Assistance Association for Political Prisoners, there are currently 176 political prisoners, in Burmese prisons. On 23 July 2013, another amnesty was announced and 73 political prisoners were released, but about 100 political prisoners were still remained.

In October 2011, the government passed new International Labour Organization-approved legislation that allows for labour unions with at least 30 members, the right to strike, given 2 weeks' notice. This law, effective 9 March 2012, also provides for punishment of employers who dismiss workers on strike or unionised workers with up to a year in prison and a fine of 100,000 kyat, as well punishment of workers who stage illegal strikes, with up to a year in jail and a fine of 30,000 kyat.

On 16 March 2012, the Ministry of Labour signed a memorandum of understanding with the ILO to end forced labour by 2015.

The government has however, denied the presence of other human right issues such as alleged army abuses against ethnic minorities, claiming that in ethnic areas, only local insurgent groups violate human rights. The government has accused the Kachin Independence Army of planting bombs, destroying bridges and trading in illegal drugs. Insurgent groups have resumed fighting since a 2008 ceasefire in opposition to the new constitution of Myanmar that requires all armed forces be under the control of the national Defense Service. Peace talks were held in November to reach a compromise.

=== Economics ===
Since 2011, Myanmar embarked on policy reforms of anti-corruption laws, currency exchange rates, foreign investment laws and taxation. Foreign investment increased from US$300 million in 2009–10 to a US$20 billion in 2010–11. The large inflow of capital resulted in a stronger valuation of the kyat (Burmese currency) by about 25%. In response, the government relaxed import restrictions and abolished export taxes. Despite currency problems, the Burmese economy was expected to grow by about 8.8% in 2011.

Myanmar has a complex foreign exchange system with black markets, foreign exchange certificates, and multiple exchange rates. On request of the government to alleviate its souring currency conditions, an International Monetary Fund (IMF) team visited Myanmar in October. After the visit, the government allowed private banks to engage in the foreign exchange market.

The Central Bank of Myanmar embarked on a plan to unify the country's multiple exchange rate system. From April 2012 to April 2013, the official exchange rate of 6.4 kyats to US$1 (a rate unchanged since 1977, when it was pegged to the IMF's special drawing rights) was floated up, to foster an interbank money market. From 2013 to 2014, the most widely used informal black market rate was anticipated to be eliminated. The informal exchange rates were used for most daily transactions, while the overvalued official exchange rate was used to calculate government revenue and state-owned enterprises. There are other informal exchange rates, such an exchange rate used by UN agencies and international NGOs (450 kyat to US$1 in 2010), a customs rate, and an official market rate. Such discrepancies distorted national accounts (since firms were required to report all transactions in Burmese kyat at the official rate) and reduced transparency and accountability. On 2 April 2012, the Central Bank of Myanmar began trading at the new reference exchange rate of 818 kyat to 1 US dollar.

In March 2012, a draft foreign investment law emerged, the first in more than two decades. This law would oversee unprecedented liberalisation of the economy. Foreigners would no longer require a local partner to start a business in the country, because they will be able to legally lease land. The draft law also stipulated that Burmese citizens must constitute at least 25% of the firm's skilled workforce, and with training, increased in increments of 25% up to 75% in subsequent years.

== International reaction ==
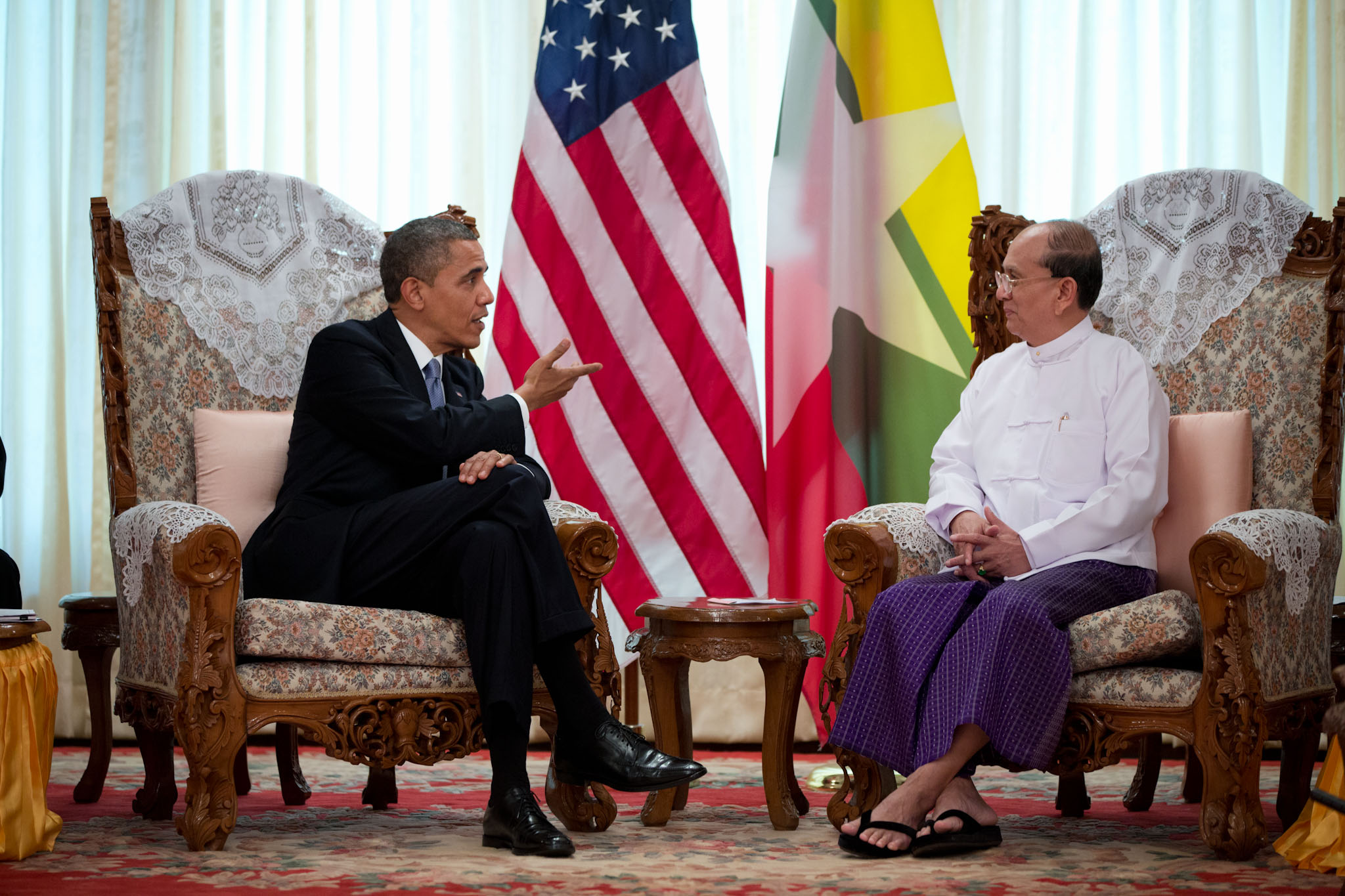
Thein Sein meets U.S. President Barack Obama in Yangon, 19 November 2012

Although the government has been applauded for the reforms, many countries remain "cautiously optimistic". Japan resumed sending aid which was suspended after the 2007 killing of a Japanese journalist. ASEAN approved Burma's bid for chair in 2014.

The United States, Australia and the EU have called for further action, such as the unconditional release of all political prisoners, as a prerequisite for the lifting of international sanctions on the Myanmar government. The United States appointed a special envoy, Derek Mitchell, to chart a new policy from Myanmar away from isolation.

=== Improvement in U.S.-Burmese relations ===
Following the government reforms in 2011 and the visit of U.S. Secretary of State Hillary Clinton to the country, the U.S. announced several initiatives, including the removal of some curbs on foreign aid, aimed at re-engagement with Myanmar, a step toward the restoration of full diplomatic relations. In January 2012, following the release of prominent political prisoners including Min Ko Naing, the U.S. and Myanmar restored full diplomatic relations and exchanged ambassadors, though further ties would be dependent on additional reforms.

In September 2016, the Cardin-McCain Burma Strategy Act of 2016, a piece of bipartisan proposed U.S. legislation, was introduced to the Senate. The legislation seeks to set "'benchmarks and guidelines' on sanctions relief by calling on the U.S. Secretary of State to assess and make recommendations regarding modifying or lifting sanctions, with a focus on issues such as democracy and ethnic reconciliation." The legislation would also authorize humanitarian aid; authorize economic aid to support Burmese civil society groups; create a Burma-America Development Fund to foster private-sector investment; and authorize limited military-to-military relations.

== Analysis ==
Neither Western sanctions nor Asian constructive engagement should be credited for what we are witnessing today.

— Marie Lall

Experts caution that the reforms will be disproved by the hardliners and probably lead to counterrevolution. But, Minister U Kyaw Hsan said there is no intention to retract reforms.

The motives of such reforms are also debated. Marie Lall, a BBC South Asia analyst attributed Burma's bid for the ASEAN chair in 2014, the need to reform the economy for the ASEAN Free Trade Area and the government's desire to win the election in 2015 as the main motives of the reforms.

In a February 2012 interview, Aung San Suu Kyi said that the reforms can still be reversed and urged observers to wait until after the 2012 by-elections and any subsequent policy changes to make a better assessment:

"Ultimate power still rests with the army so until we have the army solidly behind the process of democratisation we cannot say that we have got to a point where there will be no danger of a U-turn. Many people are beginning to say that the democratisation process here is irreversible. It's not so. We must wait until after the elections to find out whether or not there have been real changes. And depending on these changes, there should be suitable changes in policy."

— Aung San Suu Kyi

In Freedom House's 2012 Freedom in the World, the country's civil liberties rating improved from 7 to 6, because of increased public discussion and news and politics media coverage, and reduced restrictions on education. The report also noted:

Despite these initial signs of progress, it remained unclear how far the reforms would go, and numerous conflicts between the government and the country’s ethnic minority militias remained unresolved.

Scholar Thant Myint-U has observed that military representatives and MPs have not necessarily voted on party lines on important issues, noting that party organisations are still relatively undeveloped.

=== Criticisms ===
Human Rights Watch has criticised a new assembly law, the Law Relating to Peaceful Assembly and Peaceful Procession, signed on 2 December 2011, for restricting the right to protest and failing to meet international standards. The law requires would-be protesters to seek permission from township police five days in advance, including such details on the demonstration as the slogans to be used, and gives authority arbitrary powers to deny citizens the right to protest.

Regarding the 2012 by-elections, the National League for Democracy has pointed out irregularities in voter lists, rule violations by local election committees and vote-buying practices by the Union Solidarity and Development Party. On 21 March 2012, Aung San Suu Kyi was quoted as saying "Fraud and rule violations are continuing and we can even say they are increasing."

The country still lacks an independent judiciary system, which remains politicised and closely tied to the government. For instance, lawyers who defend prisoners of conscience are routinely stripped of their license to practice law, while sentences are arbitrarily administered. A March 2012 United Nations report states:

Myanmar lacks an independent, impartial and effective judiciary, which is not only essential for its transition to democracy but also necessary to uphold the rule of law, ensure checks and balances on the executive and the legislative, and safeguard human rights and fundamental freedoms in Myanmar.

A Human Rights Watch report, released in March 2012, states that human rights abuses by the Tatmadaw continue, especially in border regions, such as Kachin State, where 75,000 civilians have been displaced, since hostilities broke out in 2011 between the rebel group Kachin Independence Army and Burmese government soldiers. According to the report, forced labour and military conscription, blockage of international aid, attacks on civilians and private properties, rape and torture, as well as use of landmines, continue to be practised in the country.

Ironically, after the military regime started to lift autocratic controls, the already persecuted Muslim Rohingya minority suffered further repression in part because "Free speech empowered preachers of anti-Muslim hatred." This atmosphere led to events such as the 2012 Rakhine State riots and 2015 Rohingya refugee crisis. However, many human rights activists and people in Burma believe that this ethnic hatred is a direct result of military rule, as the military promoted an extreme form of Burman nationalism during the years 1962–2011.

== See also ==
- 8888 Uprising
- Saffron Revolution
- 2015 Myanmar general election
- 2021 Myanmar protests
