= Zaw Htet Ko Ko =

- Born: January 6, 1981 (age 45); Burma
- Education: 3rd year law student, Dagon University
- Occupations: Photo shop owner, Activist
- Criminal penalty: 11 years
- Criminal status: Pardoned
- Spouse: San Latt Phyu
- Parent: Aung Myint
- Website: Facebook

Zaw Htet Ko Ko (Burmese: ဇော်ထက်ကိုကို, pronounced [zɔ̀ tʰɛʔ kò kò]) is a Burmese political activist. In 2008, he was sentenced an 11-year prison sentence for his work with the pro-democracy 88 Generation Students Group, and his detention was criticized by human rights groups including Amnesty International, which named him a prisoner of conscience. He was released in October 2011 in a series of amnesties for political prisoners.

== 88 Generation Students Group involvement ==
Zaw Htet Ko Ko became involved in the 88 Generation Students Group shortly after its 2005 founding through his friend Htay Kywe, one of the group's leaders. The group called for an end to the rule of Burma's military leadership, the State Peace and Development Council; the release of all alleged political prisoners; and a return to democracy.

Described by Amnesty International as an "Internet enthusiast", Zaw Thet Ko Ko helped the group communicate news of its protests to the outside world. He also served as the group's photographer at events such as its "White Sunday" campaign, in which activists wore white prisoner's clothing each Sunday to show solidarity with imprisoned activists.

== Involvement in Saffron Revolution ==
When rising fuel and commodity prices led to Saffron Revolution in August 2007, the 88 Generation Students Group played a major role in organizing protests. The largest of these rallies drew over one hundred thousand protesters, most notably a number of Buddhist monks. Zaw Thet Ko Ko participated in several of these rallies, most notably a march on 23 August led by group members Mie Mie and Nilar Thein. Following the arrest of several group leaders, however, including Min Ko Naing, he joined Htay Kywe and Mie Mie in hiding. On 13 October, the three were arrested at a rubber plantation along with fellow group members Aung Thu and Hein Htet.

== Trial and imprisonment ==
In the weeks following Zaw Htet Ko Ko's arrest, his father alleged that he believed Zaw Htet Ko Ko was being tortured in prison. While Zaw Thet Ko Ko escaped the 65-year sentences given to fellow members such as Min Ko Naing, Htay Kywe, Mie Mie, Nilar Thein, and others, on 21 November 2008, he was sentenced to five years of hard labor by a special court at Insein Prison. Seven days later, he was charged with an additional six years of imprisonment, for a total of eleven years. The sentence was protested by Front Line and Amnesty International, the latter of which named him a prisoner of conscience. Human Rights Watch stated its belief that the imprisoned 88 Generation Student Group members were political prisoners and called for their immediate and unconditional release.

On 6 February 2009, he was transferred from Insein to Kyaukpyu Prison in Rakhine State. According to an Irrawaddy story on Zaw Htet Ko Ko's case, "transferring political prisoners to distant prisons is one of the tactics to further punish prisoners and increase the burden on their families and friends."

On 11 or 12 October 2011, Zaw Htet Ko Ko was pardoned as part of a series of amnesties for political prisoners.

== Family ==
Zaw Htet Ko Ko is married to San Latt Phyu, a medical doctor at Yangon Muslim Free Hospital. They have one son.
