= Aung Zaw =

Aung Zaw may refer to:

- Aung Zaw (footballer) (born 1990), Burmese footballer
- Aung Zaw (editor) (c. 1968), Burmese journalist and editor
