= Mie Mie =

Burmese democracy activist (1970–2018)

- Born: Thin Thin Aye; 1970
- Died: 13 August 2018 (aged 47–48); Kyaunggon, Myanmar
- Education: Dagon University
- Occupation: democracy activist
- Organization: 88 Generation Students Group
- Political party: National League for Democracy
- Spouse: Hla Moe

Thin Thin Aye (Burmese: သင်းသင်းအေး, pronounced [θɪ́ɰ̃ θɪ́ɰ̃ ʔé]; 1970 – 13 August 2018), better known as Mie Mie (မီးမီး [mí mí]), was a Burmese democracy activist who organized and led numerous anti-government protests. She was imprisoned three times between 1988 and 2012, and Amnesty International considered her to be a prisoner of conscience.

Aye died in a car accident on 13 August 2018, near Kyaunggon, at the age of 47.

== 1988 uprising and 1996 arrest ==
In the summer of 1988, a series of protests escalated in Yangon and other cities demanding the resignation of General Ne Win, Burma's military ruler. These protests took their name from the date of the largest march, 8-8-88. Aye, a 10th-grade high school student at the time, joined the uprising and became active in the All Burma Federation of Student Unions. On 7 March 1989, she was arrested for the first time for distributing fliers commemorating the one-year anniversary of the death of Phone Maw, whose killing by security forces helped prompt the previous year's uprising. She was detained for three months, then released. In 1990, she traveled to campaign on behalf of the National League for Democracy (NLD).

In 1996, Aye was studying at Dagon University in Yangon when she took part in a protest and was subsequently arrested. She was then imprisoned for seven years in Tharyarwaddy Prison.

== Saffron Revolution and third arrest ==
Following her 2003 release, she became involved with the pro-democracy 88 Generation Students Group. When rising fuel and commodity prices led to widespread unrest in Yangon in August 2007, the 8888 Generation Students Group played a major role in organizing protests. The largest of these rallies drew over one hundred thousand protesters, most notably a number of Buddhist monks, giving the uprising the popular nickname "The Saffron Revolution" for the color of their robes. The New York Times described Aye as "prominent in photographs and videos of the first small demonstrations", noting that she appeared in the shots "with her fist raised".

Following a government crackdown on protestors, members of the 88 Generation Students Group were swiftly arrested. On 22 August, the day after several 88 Generation leaders had been arrested, Aye led a protest march and then went into hiding. She was arrested herself on 13 October 2007 at a rubber plantation where she was hiding with fellow leaders Aung Thu, Htay Kywe, Zaw Htet Ko Ko and Hein Htet.

== Trial and imprisonment ==
Leading up to her trial, Aye was detained with other activists at Insein Prison. On 11 November 2008, she and other 88 Generation members were convicted of four counts of "illegally using electronic media" and one count of "forming an illegal organization", for a total sentence of 65 years in prison apiece. Aye reportedly shouted in response to the judge, "We will never be frightened!"

Amnesty International named her a prisoner of conscience and called on multiple occasions for her release. Human Rights Watch called for the 2007 protesters to be exonerated and freed, as did Front Line.

Aye's health was said to be deteriorating as a result of her imprisonment. In 2008, an NLD spokesperson alleged that prison authorities were refusing her proper treatment for her heart condition. Her husband stated that she also suffers from spondylosis and arthritis.

== Release ==
Aye was released on 13 January 2012 as part of a mass presidential pardon of political prisoners.

== Personal life ==
Aye married Hla Moe in 1990 and has three children with him. Hla Moe works in a car repair shop and in 2009 told Irrawaddy magazine that he was allowed one twenty-minute prison visit with his wife per month.

== Death ==
Aye died in a car accident on 13 August 2018, near Kyaunggon, at the age of 47.
