= Pyone Cho =

Burmese politician

Pyone Cho MP
- ပြုံးချို
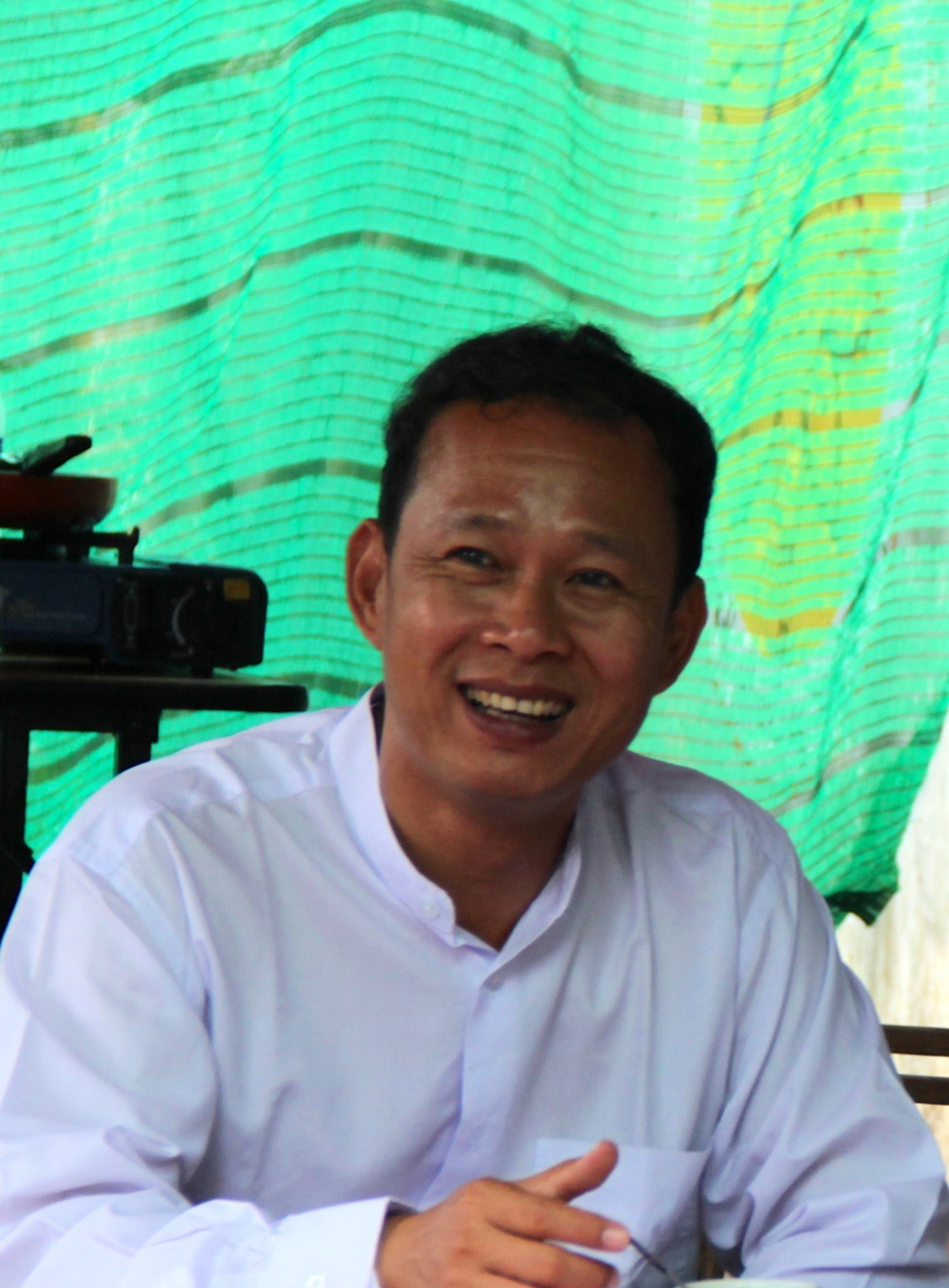

Member of the Burmese House of Representatives for Dawbon Township
- Incumbent
- Assumed office 1 February 2016

Personal details
- Born: Htay Win Aung; 2 April 1966 (age 60) Rangoon, Myanmar
- Party: National League for Democracy
- Spouse: Wah (m. 2007)
- Parent(s): Win Maung, Mya Mya Aye
- Education: Yangon University
- Occupation: Politician
- Known for: 8888 Uprising; Saffron Revolution; 88 Generation Students Group

Pyone Cho (Burmese: ပြုံးချို); (born Htay Win Aung on 2 April 1966), whose name means "sweet smile" in Burmese, is an activist and former political prisoner, who served as a Member of Parliament (MP) in the House of Representatives for Dawbon Township in Yangon, from 2015 to 2021. He was elected as a Regional Parliamentary Member for Dawbon Township for Yangon Division in the 2020 elections, but was unable to serve due to the military coup of 2021. He is an internationally recognized human rights activist, as well as a former student organizer and leader of the 8888 Uprising in Myanmar.

== Political imprisonment ==
Pyone Cho was arrested in December 1989 and sent to Insein prison for his involvement in the 8888 Uprising. After being held without trial for nearly two years, he was sentenced to seven years imprisonment in December 1991. In 1995, while being imprisoned, he signed a letter, together with 23 others, to Yozo Yokota, the United Nations Special Rapporteur on the Situation of Human Rights in Myanmar, about human rights abuses in prison. He was also accused of organizing, writing, and distributing a newsletter inside the prison that contained poetry, sketches, and stories by political prisoners. Because political prisoners were denied the right to read and write (they were not allowed to have pens or pencils in their possession), the military government added another seven years to his sentence in 1996. He was eventually released in November 2003.

Together with Min Ko Naing, Jimmy, Mya Aye, Ko Ko Gyi, Ant Bwe Kyaw, Htay Kywe, and other activists, he founded the 88 Generation Students Group (officially known as the 88 Generation Peace and Open Society) in September 2005. On 29 September 2006, he was arrested again by military junta, together with Min Ko Naing, Ko Ko Gyi, Htay Kywe and Min Zeya for their pro-democracy activities, including the White Sunday Campaign, which began in early 2006. He was released again on 11 January 2007.

In August 2007, he and other activists marched to protest against high fuel prices. The protests led to the Saffron Revolution, the largest demonstrations against the military government since 1988. On 22 August 2007, he and other prominent activists were rearrested. He was detained in prison without trial for more than a year until August 2008. On 11 November, he was sentenced to 65 years in prison.

On 13 January 2012, he was released as part of a mass presidential pardon of political prisoners with nearly 600 other political prisoners. He spent 20 years of his adult life as a prisoner and was considered a prisoner of conscience by Amnesty International.

== Political career ==
Pyone Cho was elected for a parliamentary seat in the lower house (Pyithu Hluttaw)'s Dawbon constituency in the 2015 general election, representing the National League for Democracy. He is the first student leader of the 88 Generation Students Group to be elected into the Burmese Parliament.

Prior to becoming a member of the Burmese Parliament, Pyone Cho was one of the main leaders of the 88 Generation Peace and Open Society, a social movement and infl activist group, and political and human rights organization in Myanmar, consisting of democracy activists from the 1988 Uprising, the 1996/1998 student democracy movement, and other younger generation of activists.

== Family ==
Pyone Cho married to Wah Wah Win in 2007 in the middle of one of his releases.

Pyone Cho's younger brother, Thet Win Aung, was also an internationally recognized human rights figure. Thet Win Aung died in Mandalay Prison at the age of thirty-five, after being imprisoned and tortured for engaging in peaceful acts of protest.
