= Myanmar National Human Rights Commission =

Government agency of Myanmar

- မြန်မာနိုင်ငံ အမျိုးသားလူ့အခွင့်အရေး ကော်မရှင်

Commission overview
- Formed: 5 September 2011; 14 years ago
- Preceding commission: Human Rights Committee
- Jurisdiction: Myanmar (Burma)
- Headquarters: No. 27, Pyay Road, Hlaing Township, Yangon
- Commission executives: U Hla Myint, Chairman; Nanda Hmun, Vice-Chairman
- Website: mnhrc.org.mm

The Myanmar National Human Rights Commission (Burmese: မြန်မာနိုင်ငံ အမျိုးသားလူ့အခွင့်အရေး ကော်မရှင်, romanized: Myanmarninengan Aamyoesarr Lhuaahkwngaarayy Kawmashin, abbreviated MNHRC) is the independent national human rights commission of Myanmar, consisting of 11 retired bureaucrats and academics.

Analysts have questioned the panel's will and ability to challenge the government, but the commission has challenged the President's claims that there are no political prisoners in Myanmar, calling for all political prisoners' release and amnesty. In February 2012, the MNHRC chairman, Win Mra, ruled out the possibility of investigating human rights abuses in ethnic minority areas, calling it premature to investigate in conflict areas.

According to MNHRC's former chairman Win Mra, the commission was formed under the Paris Principles, as an independent body, to investigate complaints of possible human rights violations.

The commission was formed on 5 September 2011 under Notification No. 34/2011 by President Thein Sein with 15 commissioners. The commission was reformed on 24 September 2014 under Notification No. 23/2014 because of the Myanmar National Human Rights Commission Law with 11 commissioners. The commission's office is located in Hlaing Township, Yangon. Its formation, which is not mandated by the constitution, has been a source of controversy, especially when it requested a share of the national budget (K 547,208,000) for 2012 to 2013, as the NHRC is not a Union-level body.

Its predecessor, a human rights committee under the Ministry of Home Affairs, was formed on 26 April 2000.

== Members ==
The 7-member body largely consists of civilians from academia (2 retired professors), foreign affairs (3 retired ambassadors), and civil servants. While the previous iteration of the commission had several members who are from ethnic minority groups including Rakhine and Karen, its current composition has fewer ethnic minorities. Its chairman, Win Mra, is an ethnic Rakhine. commissioner, Soe Phone Myint, is an ethnic Kayin.

1. Win Mra (chairman)
2. Sit Myaing (Vice-chairman)
3. Myint Kyi
4. Yu Lwin Aung
5. Nyunt Swe
6. Khin Maung Lay
7. Soe Phone Myint
8. Sein Than
9. Nyunt Tin
10. Tin May Htun

The MNHRC was first formed by President decree in September 2011 and re-formed three years later in September 2014 after the first MNHRC law was enacted. The MNHRC law mandates that the rights commission be re-formed every five years. On January 14, 2020, Myanmar President Office released a statement that Myanmar National Human Rights Commission was being reorganized with 11 commissioners. This 11 commission is led by U Hla Myint, the Myanmar representative to the ASEAN intergovernmental commission on Human Rights (AICHR) and Vice chair Nanda Hmun, the retired permanent secretary of the Ministry of Religion and Culture.

1. U Hla Myint (chairman)
2. Nanda Hmun (Vice Chair)
3. U Paw Lwin Sein (Ambassador)- Retired
4. U Kyaw Soe (Director-BSI)- Retired
5. Than Myint (Director General of Department of Medical Science)- Retired
6. Daw Nu Nu Yin (Permanent Secretary of the office of the Attorney General)- Retired
7. Tin Maung Maung Than (Head of Section of Ministry of Industry 2)- Retired
8. Myint Thu Myaing (Professor/Head of Law Department of University of Yangon)
9. U Tin Aung (Head of Department of office of the Commander in Chief / Brigadier General)- Retired
10. Daw Tin Kyi U (Deputy Director General of the Auditor General of the Union)- Retired
11. U Kyaw Myint (Deputy Director General of General administration Department)- Retired

== Controversy ==
In September 2016, the commission faced sustained criticism and questions regarding conduct of the commission arises when they brokered the compensation scheme to accept 5 million Kyat, approximately US$4,000, instead of pursuing legal action in the case of two girls tortured for 5 years as housemaids in Yangon. The Ava Tailor Shop owners reportedly forced the girls, currently 16 and 17 years old, to work without day-off and tortured over the course of 5 years: breaking their fingers and arms, and slicing with knife. On 22 September, MP Pyone Cho from Dawbon Township submitted an urgent proposal to take action against the commission, and the Pyithu Hluttaw accepted to discuss further. On 6 October 2016, the President's Office issued the order statement, statement number 56/2016, allowing the following committee members to withdraw from their posts: U Zaw Win, Nyan Zaw, Than Nwe and Daw Mya Mya.

== See also ==
- Human rights in Burma
