= .mm =

Internet country code top-level domain for Myanmar

- Introduced: 4 February 1997
- TLD type: Country code top-level domain
- Status: Active
- Registry: MPT
- Sponsor: Ministry of Transport and Communications
- Intended use: Entities connected with Myanmar
- Actual use: There are some functional sites in Myanmar under this domain, although there has been relatively little Internet activity until recently and much of that activity comes from foreign sites
- Registration restrictions: Unknown
- Structure: Registrations are at the third level beneath second-level categories
- Registry website: www.ptd.gov.mm/nic.aspx

.mm is the Internet country code top-level domain (ccTLD) for Myanmar. It was assigned in 1997. Before 1989, the ISO 3166 alpha-2 code for Burma was BU, but no .bu ccTLD was assigned.

== History ==
A company run by two Australian immigrants in Myanmar, Eagle Group, established the first Internet access in Myanmar in 1997. They contracted with a British company called Digiserve, based in High Wycombe, to provide DNS services for .mm. All .mm DNS queries were handled by Digiserve's two name servers acting as root name servers for .mm, ns1.digiserve.com and ns2.digiserve.com respectively. In 1999, the Burmese government shut down Eagle Group's service.

In February 2002, the DigiServe DNS servers were hacked by pro-democracy activists, which resulted in the traffic to all .mm domain names, including www.gov.mm, being redirected to a website demanding the release of famous student leader Min Ko Naing for a period of three days.

At the beginning of 2005, MPT finally retook management control of the .mm name space and replaced Digiserve nameservers with their own.

Businesses in Myanmar could register for domain names within the .net.mm and .com.mm zones through Myanmar Teleport (formerly Bagan Cybertech) or from Myanmar Post & Telecoms directly. .edu.mm, .org.mm, .gov.mm domain names are reserved for official and government use. There is no WHOIS service provided.

Myanmar Teleport's service was later shut down by the Burmese government as well, leaving government-owned Myanmar Post & Telecoms as the sole controller for all the services for internet and email.

== See also ==
- Internet in Myanmar
