= Aung Zaw (editor) =

Burmese journalist, editor

- အောင်ဇော်
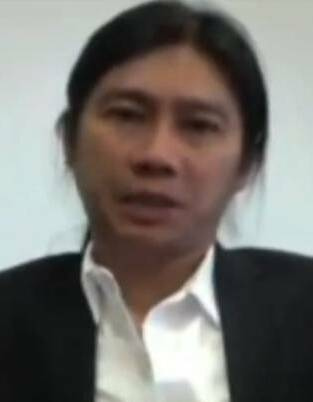
- Aung Zaw in 2014
- Born: c. 1968 (age 57–58); Rangoon, Burma
- Citizenship: Republic of the Union of Myanmar
- Education: Rangoon University
- Occupations: Journalist & editor
- Employer: The Irrawaddy
- Known for: his dissidence and publishing Burmese news from exile
- Awards: 2010 Prince Claus Award, 2013 Shorenstein Journalism Award, 2014 CPJ International Press Freedom Award

Aung Zaw, (c. 1968), is a Burmese journalist, editor, and founder of major publishing media The Irrawaddy. He was jailed and tortured at the age of 20, then covertly escaped his home country after he began protesting the governments socialist military regime during the 8888 Uprising. His news magazine reported on event later during the Saffron Revolution.

== Personal ==
Aung Zaw studied Botany at Yangon University in Rangoon, Burma (now Yangon, Myanmar). In 1988, at the age of 20, he was arrested at the Hlaing Campus of Yangon University during a student rally to protest the socialist regime of Ne Win. He was then detained for 10 days in the Insein prison. Before leaving his home country, he was a part of the Insein Literary Circle (အင်းစိန်စာပေဝိုင်း) Aung Zaw fled to Bangkok, Thailand where he would start The Irrawaddy, a news publication named after Myanmar's largest river. The publication later moved to Chiang Mai in 1995–96.

Aung Zaw, founder and editor of The Irrawaddy, began publication of the news magazine, and formed the Burma Information Group, in exile from Thailand in 1993. He operated out of Thailand for nearly two decades before being invited to return to Myanmar in 2012. Aung Zaw took The Irrawaddy online in 2001, but it was not readily available to Myanmar readers until 2011 due to online censorship. In 2014, The Irrawaddy launched its first printed publication in Myanmar. The printed publication was short lived and last printed in January 2016.

== Notable works of journalism ==
Places mentioned in Myanmar relative to the capital city of Naypyidaw.

After leaving Myanmar disguised as a monk, Aung Zaw fled to Bangkok where he started the Burma Information Group (BIG). Shortly after, he would start The Irrawaddy. In 2012, the online news magazine was granted access back into Myanmar. Still under government restrictions, he said, "Since we're back in Burma our reports remain very strong. We focus on land confiscations, corruption, scandals, as well as ethnic and religious conflicts in our country." In addition to running The Irrawaddy, he is also a contributor for The New York Times, International Herald Tribune, The Guardian (UK), and The Bangkok Post.

== Context ==
At the age of 25, Aung Zaw launched The Irrawaddy, in efforts to cover Burma affairs, in the South East Asian Countries. Aung Zaw's arrests were part of the military regimes attempt to silence the spread of information. The publication was targeted by hackers in 2008, 2010–2011.

== Impact ==
Aung Zaw notes the impact The Irrawaddy carries in the coverings of the Saffron Revolution. The Irrawaddy was receiving real time updates and publishing them online to shed light to the otherwise unnoticed protest. The Burmese government had a history of jailing and torturing journalist in attempts to silence them.

Throughout constant oppression, Aung Zaw has kept his finger on the political and social pulse of Myanmar. He was labeled an "Enemy of The State" by former military regimes.

== Awards ==
Aung Zaw was the 2010 recipient of the Prince Claus Award, the 2013 Shorenstein Journalism Award, and the 2014 CPJ International Press Freedom Award.

== See also ==
- Human rights in Myanmar
- Internet censorship in Myanmar
- Media of Myanmar
