= Ko Ko Gyi =

Burmese activist (born 1961)

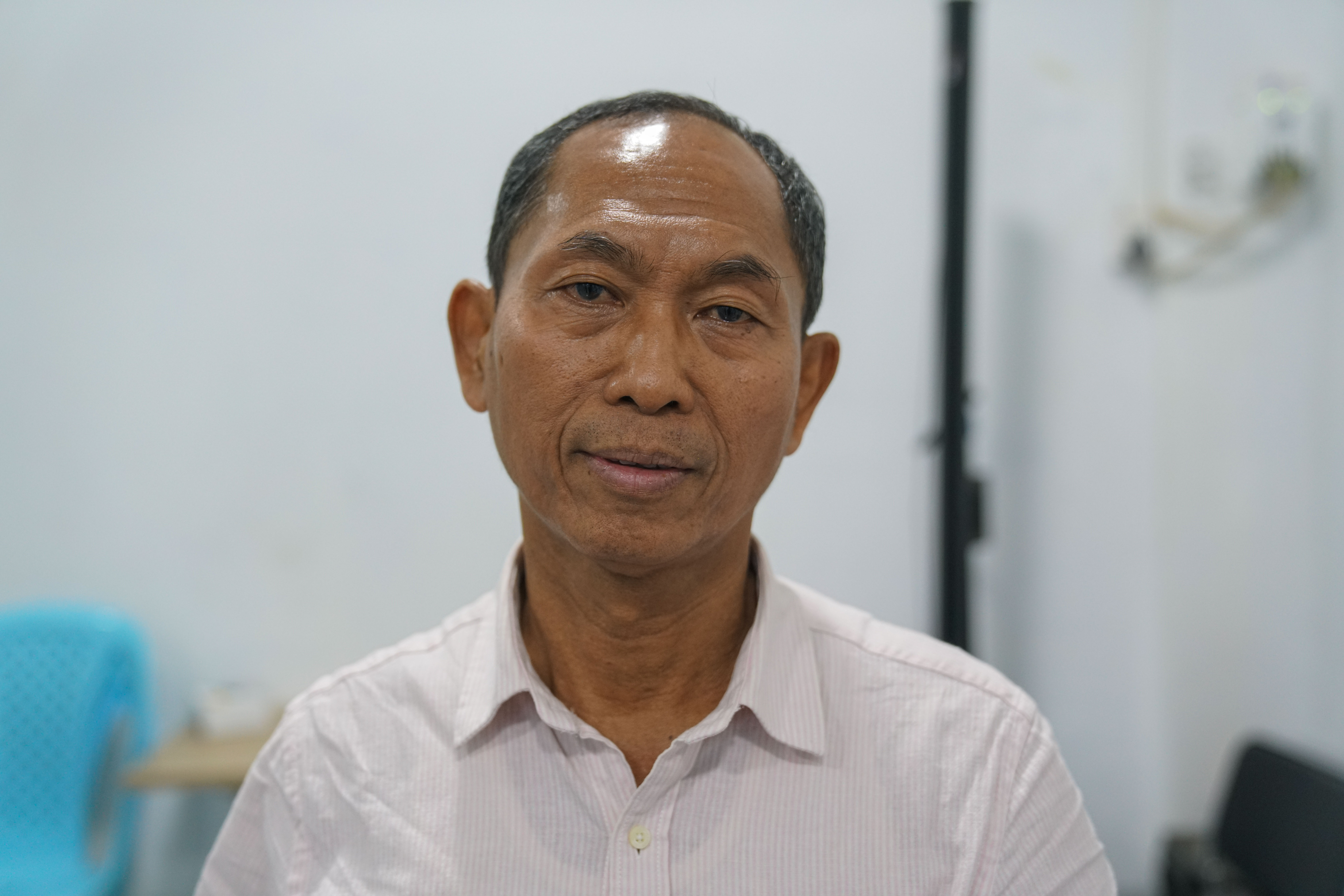
- Ko Ko Gyi in 2018
- Born: 18 December 1961 (age 64); Yangon, Myanmar (Burma)
- Education: Yangon University (Final year, International Relations)
- Alma mater: Government Technical Institute (Pyay)
- Occupation: Politician
- Organization(s): All Burma Federation of Student Unions; 88 Generation Students Group
- Political party: People's Party
- Movement: 8888 Uprising; Saffron Revolution
- Spouse: Khin Thu Thu Win (m. 2014)
- Parent: Thaung Tun

Ko Ko Gyi (Burmese: ကိုကိုကြီး, [kò kò dʑí] born 18 December 1961) is a Burmese politician. He was one of the country's most prominent democracy activists during the period of the State Peace and Development Council military government, and spent over 17 years in prison on multiple occasions between 1989 and 2012. (Note: 1989, 1991–2005, 2006–2007, 2007–2012. See (Assistance Association for Political Prisoners (Burma) (2009-06-24). "Political Prisoner Profile: Ko Ko Gyi / Case No. 0004" (PDF). aappb.org. pp. 2–5.).) He was considered a prisoner of conscience by Amnesty International. BBC News describes him as a key member of the 8888 Generation movement. He is one of the country's most prominent activists.

== Political activism ==
=== 1988 protests ===
In 1988, Ko Ko Gyi was a final year international relations major at Yangon University when the 1988 Uprising began. Ko Ko Gyi, together with fellow student leaders, led a peaceful rally on the campus of Yangon University on 15 March 1988. On 16 March 1988 he was among the students who were beaten by the police on the main street in front of the school while they were attempting to march to the Yangon Institute of Technology. On 28 August 1988, he became the vice-chair of the All Burma Federation of Student Unions (ABSFU) led by Min Ko Naing.

=== Political imprisonment ===
He was arrested on 27 April 1989, and held in detention for 44 days. Following his release, he led the ABSFU from July 1989 to December 1991, while his friend and colleague Min Ko Naing remained in detention. He was arrested again on 11 December 1991 for his involvement in a student protest at Yangon University, held to honor Aung San Suu Kyi, who was under house arrest, for her receiving the Nobel Peace Prize.

He was initially sentenced to 20 years' imprisonment with hard labor but the sentence was later reduced to 10 years. When he completed his prison term, the authorities continued to detain him under section 10(A) of the State Protection Act. He was eventually released in March 2005, after spending more than 13 years in prison. On 27 September 2006, he was arrested, together with Min Ko Naing, Htay Kywe, Min Zeya and Pyone Cho, for their pro-democracy activities, including the White Sunday Campaign, which began in early 2006. He was released on 11 January 2007.

=== Saffron Revolution ===
Ko Ko Gyi returned to politics shortly after his release. In August 2007, he and other activists from the 88 Generation movement marched to protest against high fuel prices. The protests led to the Saffron Revolution, largest demonstrations against the military government since 1988. On 21 August 2007, he and other prominent activists were arrested again. He was detained in prison without trial for more than a year until 28 August 2008. On 11 November, he was sentenced to 65 years in prison. On 13 January 2012, he was released as part of a mass presidential pardon of political prisoners with nearly 600 other political prisoners from custody.

== Political career ==
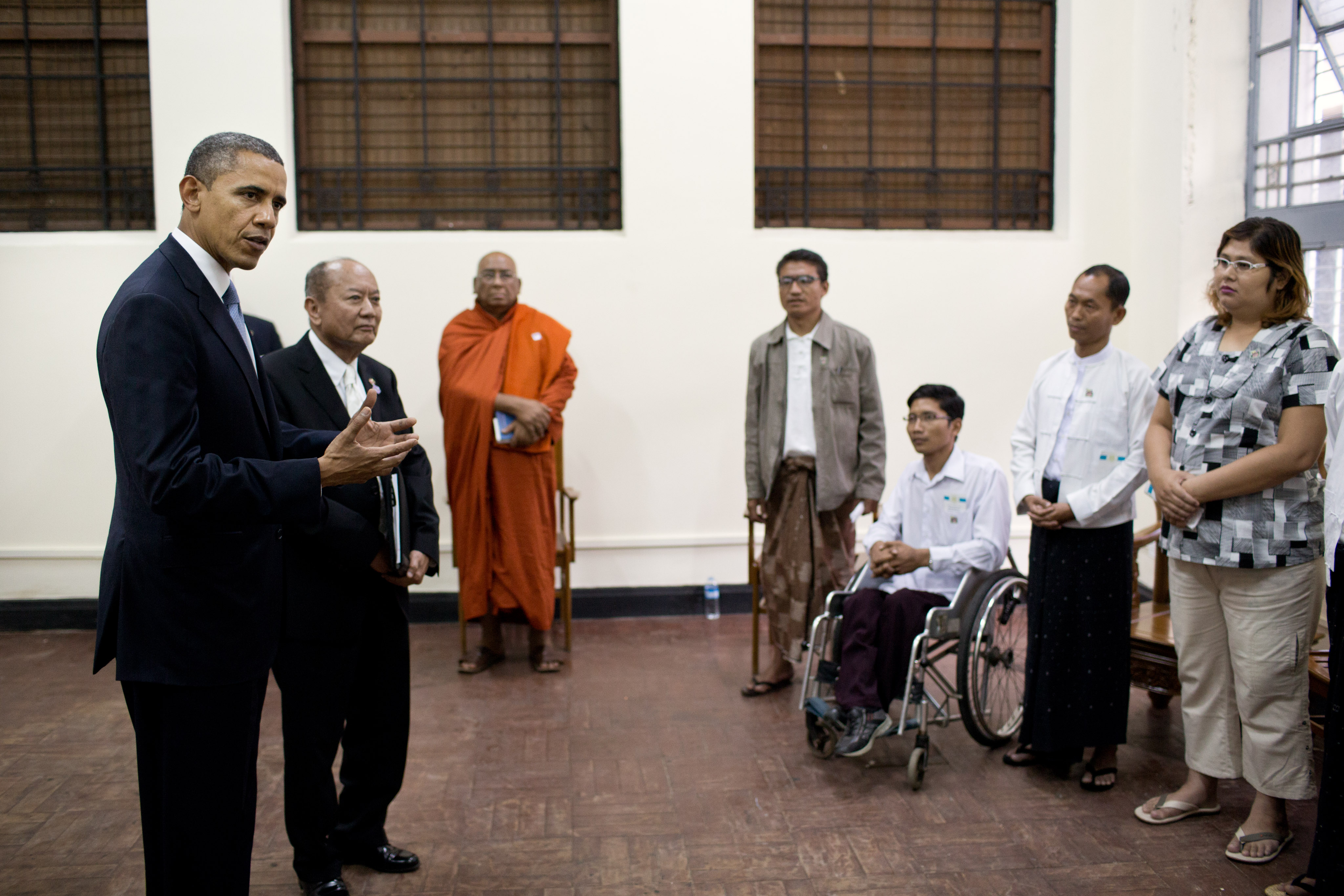
United States President Barack Obama and Burmese human rights advocates, former political prisoners, and religious leaders including Ko Ko Gyi in 2012

He was an observer to peace talks at the Myanmar Peace Centre. He was a member of Rakhine Investigation Commission to investigate the deadly 2012 sectarian violence in Rakhine state. He supported a military intervention in favor of the Rakhine, and blamed the situation on the Rohingya people, an ethnic group native to Myanmar, being made up of people entering from "neighbouring countries". Generation 88 denied the existence of the Rohingya as an indigenous ethnic group of Myanmar. On 28 August 2012, Ko Ko Gyi published a collection of political interviews entitled Free Expression (ပြောချင်လို့ပြောခဲ့တာတွေ).

He had planned to run for a seat in 2015 elections from the National League for Democracy. But, to the surprise of many, his name was omitted from the NLD’s candidate list. In response, he formed a new party, the People's Party in 2018.

Since the 2021 Myanmar coup d'état, he has publicly engaged with the military junta, signalling his intention to participate in the junta's planned elections.

On 27 January 2024, he opened the People's Party's new head office in Yangon after registering on December 29, 2023, and meeting with Min Aung Hlaing on Burmese Independence Day and January 6. However, the People's Party needed to register at least 100,000 members in three months and open 100 offices in half of all townships in six months to receive qualification under the Myanmar Junta's Political Party Registration Law.

The junta declared Ko Ko Gyi's People's Party to be qualified for national competition in the 2025 Myanmar general election.

== Personal life ==
Ko Ko Gyi is married to Khin Thu Thu Win in 2014 and they have one child.
