= Nay Phone Latt =

Burmese blogger and activist

Nay Phone Latt MP
- နေဘုန်းလတ်

Member of the Yangon Region Hluttaw for Thingangyun Township
- Incumbent
- Assumed office 8 February 2016

Personal details
- Born: Nay Myo Kyaw; 28 June 1980 (age 46) Yangon, Myanmar
- Party: National League for Democracy
- Spouse: Pyone Thar Myint
- Education: Yangon Technological University
- Occupation: Blogger; Politician
- Awards: PEN/Barbara Goldsmith Freedom to Write Award
- Criminal charge: Violation of the Electronics Act
- Criminal penalty: 20 years, 6 months in prison
- Criminal status: Pardoned
- Website: www.nayphonelatt.com

Nay Phone Latt (Burmese: နေဘုန်းလတ်; born Nay Myo Kyaw on 28 June 1980) is a Burmese blogger and activist, currently serving as a Yangon Region Hluttaw MP for Thingangyun Township. He was a recipient of PEN/Barbara Goldsmith Freedom to Write Award and selected for 2010 Time 100 list under Hero Categories. From 2008 to 2012, he was detained at Hpa-An Prison and was listed as a political prisoner by Assistance Association for Political Prisoners of Burma.

== Background ==
Nay Phone Latt graduated with Engineering degree from Yangon Technological University. He worked in Singapore for a few years before he went back to Myanmar to start his Internet Cafe business. He is also a co-founder of Myanmar ICT for Development Organization (MIDO)MIDO, a local NGO focusing on ICT for Development, Internet Freedom and Civic Technology. He is now elected in the regional parliament representing the Thingangyun constituency.

== Political imprisonment ==
Nay Phone Latt was arrested in January 2008 and sentenced to total of 20 years and 6 months in prison under Electronic act, creating public alarm and video act due to his alleged involvement in spreading news during 2007 Saffron Revolution using his blogs. He wrote regularly in a Burmese internet magazine Thanlwin Ainmat (သံလွင်အိမ်မက်, Dream of Salween River) and his personal blog, The City that I have dropped (ကနော်လွတ်ကျခဲ့တဲ့မြို့တော်) before he was arrested. On February 20, 2009, his sentence was reduced on appeal to 12 years. He was released on 13 January 2012 as part of a mass presidential pardon of political prisoners.

== International recognition ==
In 2010, Nay Phone Latt was awarded the PEN/Barbara Goldsmith Freedom to Write Award, which honors "writers who have fought courageously in the face of adversity for the right to freedom of expression".

In 2012, he participated in the International Writing Program's Fall Residency at the University of Iowa in Iowa City, IA.

== Political career ==
He successfully ran for a seat in parliament in 2015 general elections from National League for Democracy.

After the military coup in 2021, Nay Phone Latt has worked as the spokesperson for the National Unity Government (NUG) Prime Minister's Office and he is in charge of Public Voice Television (PVTV) that is for NUG's propaganda.
