= The Irrawaddy =

Burmese magazine

- Editor: Aung Zaw
- Categories: News magazine and online news
- Founded: 1990; 36 years ago
- Company: Irrawaddy Publishing Group (IPG)
- Country: Rangoon, Burma; Chiang Mai, Thailand
- Language: English, Burmese
- Website: www.irrawaddy.com

The Irrawaddy (Burmese: ဧရာဝတီ, MLCTS: ei: ra wa. ti) is a news website by the Irrawaddy Publishing Group (IPG), founded in 1990 by Burmese exiles living in Thailand. As a publication produced by former Burmese activists who fled violent crackdowns on anti-military protests in 1988, it has always been closely associated with the pro-democracy movement, although it remains unaffiliated with any of the political groups that have emerged since the 8888 Uprising.

The Irrawaddy is published in both English and Burmese, with a primary focus on Burma and Southeast Asia. It is regarded as one of the foremost journalistic publications dealing with political, social, economic and cultural developments in Burma. In addition to news, it features in-depth political analysis and interviews with a wide range of Burma experts, business leaders, democracy activists and other influential figures.

== History ==
It was started in 1990 with the name Burma Issues. The founder is Aung Zaw, a student activist from Rangoon University who left the country after the 1988 imposition of martial law and started the Burma Information Group (BIG) in Bangkok. The BIG initially circulated The Irrawaddy amongst foreign embassies, human rights groups and the Burmese exile community to update on developments inside Burma in the wake of the suppression of the pro-democracy movement and the consolidation of military control under the State Law and Order Restoration Council.

The BIG's main offices were relocated to Chiang Mai, Thailand in 1995–96, and the organization was renamed the Irrawaddy Publishing Group in 1999 to coincide with an expansion of the magazine's focus to include other political issues in Southeast Asia. The organization's online service was launched in 2000 to provide more regular coverage of breaking news, notably the fallout from the 2003 banking crisis and the downfall of senior junta leader Khin Nyunt.

In 2012, following legislative reforms to end Burma's decades-old system of prepublication censorship and the granting of new media licenses, The Irrawaddy opened a bureau in Rangoon and gradually moved its editorial operations into the country, while maintaining a legacy presence in Chiang Mai.

The Irrawaddy formerly published a monthly English language magazine and a weekly Burmese-language journal, both of which were circulated in Burma and Thailand. Its English and Burmese language websites are updated daily. The editor of the English edition is Kyaw Zwa Moe, younger brother of Aung Zaw, who was jailed for eight years while a high school student in Rangoon and joined The Irrawaddy after his release.

The English language print edition of The Irrawaddy ceased publication in September 2015, while the Burmese language edition was halted in January 2016.

In October 2022, the military government of Myanmar officially revoked the publication license of The Irrawaddy, stating that with its coverage, the news site is harmful to "state security, rule of law and public tranquility".

== Editorial stance ==
The Irrawaddy was an outspoken and strident critic of the State Law and Order Restoration Council and its successor, the State Peace and Development Council. Towards the end of the junta era, it criticized the protracted drafting of the 2008 Constitution by the military, and highlighted irregularities in the conduct of the 2010 general elections. Since the election of a civilian government, the magazine has questioned the sincerity of the country's political and economic reforms, and called for an end to the military's ongoing presence in political affairs.

Since National League for Democracy leader Aung San Suu Kyi's release from house arrest, The Irrawaddy has also at times been critical of her and her party. While not formally affiliated with any of Burma's myriad pro-democracy groups, The Irrawaddy has given a platform to members of the Assistance Association for Political Prisoners, the 88 Generation Students Group, and other civil society groups. It has reported extensively on ongoing conflicts between the military and ethnic armed groups, and recent protests over land seizures and education reforms.

According to a Financial Times article, The Irrawaddy initially received support from international donors such as the National Endowment for Democracy and Open Society Foundations. Despite its critical role in reporting on Myanmar's issues, the publication has faced scrutiny and accusations of bias. Critics argue that it has occasionally suppressed stories that could have negatively affected the National League for Democracy (NLD), especially during the 2015 electoral campaign. The rise of Buddhist nationalism and hate speech in Myanmar has also influenced its coverage. Although Kyaw Zwa Moe, an editor at The Irrawaddy, insists that the publication aims to remain unbiased, there are concerns that a shift towards a more commercial model may be impacting editorial decisions, potentially aligning with local business interests.

== Hacking attempts ==
The Irrawaddy's websites were subjected to Distributed Denial of Service attacks during the Saffron Revolution, and again on the uprising's anniversary in 2008 and 2010, which temporarily shut down both its English and Burmese online editions.

On 12 March 2011, The Irrawaddy was hacked by unknown attackers who posted fake articles on the magazine's website. One of the articles alleged a feud between Aung Zaw and Aung San Suu Kyi, claiming that the National League for Democracy leader had encouraged funding cuts for exiled media that have forced a number of organisations, including The Irrawaddy and Democratic Voice of Burma, to cut programmes and fire staff. Another article alleged the death of popular singer May Sweet in a London traffic accident. Both stories were quickly flagged as fictitious, and Aung Zaw later speculated that the attack was launched by a pro-military junta group or Naypyidaw's cyber warfare department.

On October 2, 2014, The Irrawaddy's website was hacked by a group apparently sympathetic to the radical Buddhist 969 Movement, which rose to prominence after the outbreak of intercommunal riots across Burma in 2012. Prompted by the website's syndication of a wire story reporting a cooperation agreement between the 969 Movement and Sri Lanka's Bodu Bala Sena Buddhist nationalist organization, the front page was defaced to read: "Irrawaddy supports Jihad and Radical Muslims. For the defend of Muslims and Allah, Irrawaddy have shown attacking Buddhists and others Non-Muslims with Media News (sic)."

== Awards ==
- In January 2014, Aung Zaw was announced as the 2013 winner of the Shorenstein Journalism Prize for his work with the Irrawaddy Publishing Group.
- In November 2014, Aung Zaw was presented with an CPJ International Press Freedom Award by the Committee to Protect Journalists, citing The Irrawaddy's coverage of Burma as "authoritative and independent".

== Criticism ==
Before media reforms in 2012 allowed exile media organizations to establish an official presence in Burma, The Irrawaddy relied on a network of stringers and sources operating inside the country and communicating developments back to Chiang Mai by telephone. In some instances, inaccurate reports were published on political developments during the transfer of power from the State Peace and Development Council to the Pyidaungsu Hluttaw after the 2010 general elections:

- On August 27, 2010, The Irrawaddy reported the resignation of Senior General Than Shwe. The report proved to be false when state-run newspapers referred to him as Senior General three days later. Than Shwe ultimately resigned his commission six months later, dissolving the State Peace and Development Council in March 2011 as Thein Sein assumed the presidency of the new government.
- On February 10, 2011, citing an anonymous senior government official and "sources close to the military", The Irrawaddy alleged that Tatmadaw Commander in Chief Than Shwe would head a 'State Supreme Council', an extra-constitutional body which would exercise power over the new parliamentary government. The report was soon further spread by other foreign and exile media including Asian Correspondent and Democratic Voice of Burma, and was eventually referred to in an April 2011 resolution by United States Republican senators Richard Lugar, Mitch McConnell and Jim Inhofe. Reports of the council's existence eventually proved to be incorrect, although the amount of influence Than Shwe exerts on senior political and military leaders in Burma continues to be a matter of debate.
- In 2017, The Irrawaddy was accused of fuelling anti-Rohingya sentiment. The website's Burmese-language version had referred to the ethnic group as "Bengali", a term implying they were illegal immigrants from Bangladesh. In September 2017, the website falsely reported of former U.S. ambassador to Myanmar Derek J. Mitchell alleging the Rohingya "would demand a Rohingya State or Muslim State" if their ethnic name were officially recognized. A report in October 2017 by the Myanmar Institute for Democracy found The Irrawaddy's coverage of the first two weeks of the Rakhine crisis had mainly relied on news released by government. Cartoonists from the outlet had published a cartoon depicting a dark-skinned Rohingya cutting in line in front of other ethnic minorities, and another one which suggested Bangladeshis were waiting at the western edge of Myanmar ready to invade.

== Notable op-ed contributors ==
- Khin Ohmar – Former All Burma Students' Democratic Front member and 8888 Uprising leader
- Bo Kyi – Former political prisoner and secretary of the Assistance Association for Political Prisoners
- Zin Mar Aung – Democracy activist and former political prisoner
- Myint Oo – Medical practitioner and public health advocate
- Thant Myint-U – Founding chairman of the Yangon Heritage Trust and grandson of former UN Secretary-General U Thant
- Bertil Lintner – Former contributor to the Far Eastern Economic Review and Burma expert
- David I. Steinberg – Distinguished Professor of Asian Studies Emeritus at Georgetown University.

== See also ==
- Democratic Voice of Burma
- Mizzima News
- Radio Free Asia
- Internet in Burma
- Media of Burma
- Censorship in Burma
