= Nilar Thein =

Burmese democracy activist

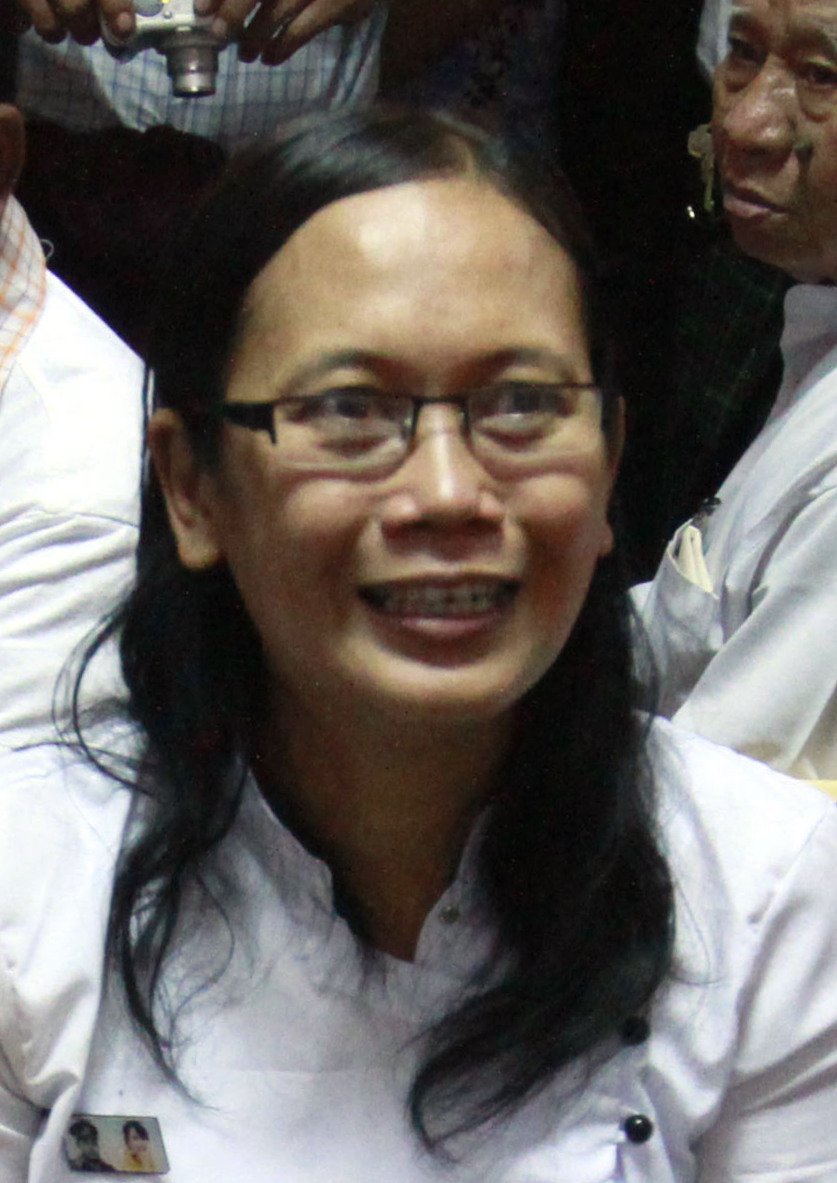
- Nilar Thein, in 2012
- Born: 4 March 1972 (age 54); Rangoon, Burma
- Occupation: Activist
- Criminal penalty: 65 years
- Criminal status: Pardoned
- Spouse: Kyaw Min Yu
- Children: Phyu Nay Kyi Min Yu, Aww Yatha Minn Yu
- Parent(s): U Thein, Daw Aye Mu
- Awards: Homo Homini Award (2008)

Nilar Thein (Burmese: နီလာသိန်း, pronounced [nìlà θéiɰ̃]) (born 4 March 1972) is a Burmese democracy activist and political prisoner imprisoned from 2008 to 2012 at Thayet prison in Burma's Magway Region. Amnesty International considered her a prisoner of conscience.

== 8888 uprising and subsequent arrests ==
Nilar Thein is from Yangon, Burma. She and her future husband, Kyaw Min Yu (better known as "Ko Jimmy"), participated in 1988's pro-democracy 8888 Uprising, opposing the continued rule of the military dictatorship State Law and Order Restoration Council (SLORC). In 1990, she was imprisoned for two months for her participation in protests. In December 1996, she was arrested for organizing protests and sentenced to ten years imprisonment, which she served at Thayawaddy prison. She reported being abused and sexually harassed by prison staff during this sentence, stating that "under the prison chief, U Win Myint, prisoners sentenced for rape were kept next to the women's building... Prison staff and these prisoners would come and peep at us while we took our baths." She was released in 2003. In 2005, she married Kyaw Min Yu. At around the same time, she joined the newly formed 88 Generation Students Group.

== Role in 2007 protests ==
In August 2007, anti-government protests (popularly known as the "Saffron Revolution" for the prominent involvement of Buddhist monks) broke out in Yangon in response to increasing fuel and commodity prices. As a part of the protests, Nilar Thein organized a march of roughly 500 people to protest government policies. When police began seeking the organizers of the protest, Nilar Thein went into hiding. Her husband had already been arrested on the night of 21 August and sent to Insein Prison.

In May, Nilar Thein had given birth to a baby girl, Phyu Nay Kyi Min Yu, and when hiding with the infant became too difficult, she left the child with in-laws. She then evaded capture for a little more than a year, changing locations and cell phone numbers frequently to avoid detection; she told a reporter that at one point in this period she escaped arrest in a rickshaw taxi. In March 2008, People in Need awarded Nilar Thein, along with political prisoners Su Su Nway and Phyu Phyu Thin, the Homo Homini Award. On 19 June 2008, Nilar Thein published an editorial in the English-language Thai newspaper The Nation, protesting the Burmese government's treatment of women and children. In it, she asks, "When the government itself is the abuser of human rights and the perpetrator of rape and other forms of gender-based violence, who will protect the victims? Who will end their tragedy? Who will secure the joyful reunion of mothers with their children?"

== Arrest, trial, and imprisonment ==
On 10 September 2008, Nilar Thein was arrested on her way to visit the mother of another political prisoner, Ant Bwe Kyaw, in Yangon. On 11 November, she and her husband were convicted along with fellow 88 Generation Students Group members Htay Kywe, Mie Mie, and ten other activists on four counts of "illegally using electronic media" and one count of "forming an illegal organization". At that time, all fourteen were serving 65-year sentences at Thayet prison.

In January 2009, her family heard secondhand information that she had developed a peptic ulcer and were concerned that her health might be deteriorating. In December 2010, Nilar Thein's family reported that prison officials had barred them from seeing her, even to bring Nilar Thein's child for a visit. Nilar Thein responded with a hunger strike.

== Release ==
Nilar Thein and Ko Jimmy were released on 13 January 2012 in a mass presidential pardon of political prisoners. Speaking from outside the prison on the day of her release, she told The Irrawaddy that "I'm happy, and I will be very happy to see my family. We will get involved in democratic reform with Auntie [Aung San Suu Kyi]."

== Rohingya genocide ==
In September 2017—at the height of the Rohingya genocide (the violent persecution of Myanmar's chiefly-Muslim minority, the Rohingya) -- Nilar Thein had reportedly been photographed escorted by, and assisting, a group of apparent Tatmadaw soldiers, while touring the conflict region, Myanmar's Rakhine state. She was subsequently among a group of 88 Generation Peace and Open Society activists appearing at a press conference, 13 September 2017, at which they issued a written statement that denied the version of events depicted in prominent international media, and in which one of the group's principal figures issued a statement essentially siding with Myanmar's civilian government in its harsh treatment of the Rohingya community.
