= 88 Generation Students Group =

Organization

The 88 Generation Students
- ၈၈ မျိုးဆက် ကျောင်းသားများ
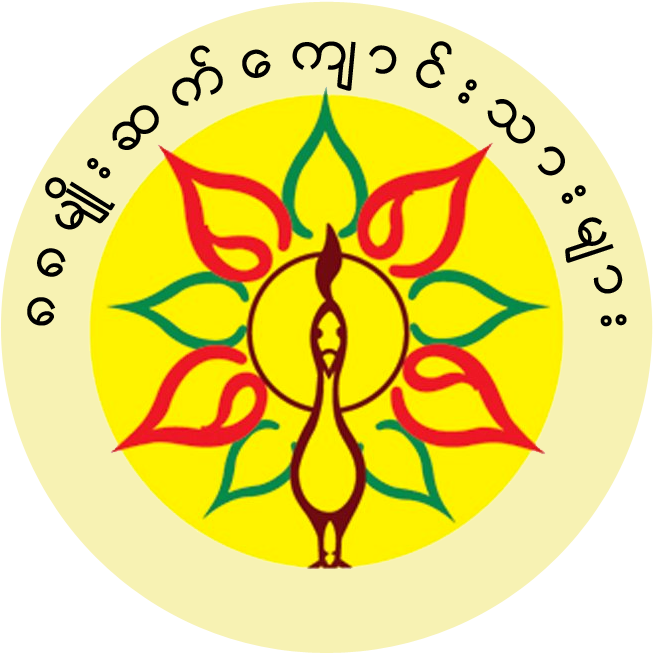
- Seal of The 88 Generation Students
- Formation: 2005
- Headquarters: Yangon, Myanmar
- Region served: Myanmar (Burma)
- Official language: Burmese

The 88 Generation Students (Burmese: ၈၈ မျိုးဆက် ကျောင်းသားများ) is a Burmese pro-democracy movement known for their activism against the country's military junta. Many of its members were imprisoned by the Burmese government on charges of "illegally using electronic media" and "forming an illegal organisation". A number of Western governments and human rights organisations called for the release of group members on the grounds that they were political prisoners.

== 8888 Uprising ==
The group takes its name from the 8888 Uprising, a series of student-led protests in 1988 opposing the military rule of Ne Win. In September 1987, Ne Win voided most denominations of the kyat without warning, causing many people to lose their savings overnight. Students who saved money for tuition fees were particularly affected. The announcement led to riots at several universities. The situation was further exacerbated by the shooting of protesting student Phone Maw in a 12 March 1988 clash with police. The protests continued to grow through August of that year, and on 8 August 1988 (8-8-88), a general strike began from which the uprising would later take its name.

The protests culminated in the 1990 general election, in which Aung San Suu Kyi's opposition party the National League for Democracy won 392 of 492 available seats. However, the military refused to recognise the results, and continued to rule the country as the State Peace and Development Council (SPDC). Following the coup, many future members of the 88 Generation Students Group were imprisoned for participation in pro-democracy activities, including Min Ko Naing, Mie Mie, Htay Kywe, Pyone Cho, and Nilar Thein.

== Founding and early activities ==
The 88 Generation Students Group was founded in 2005. An analyst for The Asia Times described them as "not a political party, but rather a movement comprising a generation of students who were active during the 1988 pro-democracy uprising". In October 2006, the group traveled the country, dressed symbolically in white, to gather signatures on a petition calling for the release of all Burma's alleged political prisoners. They delivered the resulting 535,580 signatures to both the SPDC and the United Nations. In November, the group organised a multi-religion prayer campaign to call for peace, help for the victims of recent flooding, and the release of political prisoners, and in January 2007, they called on Burma's citizens to write their complaints to SPDC Chairman Than Shwe in a campaign called "Open Heart".

== Role in Saffron Revolution ==
When rising fuel and commodity prices led to large protests in Yangon in August 2007, the 8888 Generation Students Group played a major role in organising protests. The largest of these rallies drew over one hundred thousand protesters, most notably a number of Buddhist monks, giving the uprising the popular nickname "The Saffron Revolution" for the colour of their robes. As a part of the protests, the 88 Generation Students Group organised petition drives and prayer vigils calling for democracy. The New York Times described group member Mie Mie as "prominent in photographs and videos of the first small demonstrations", noting that she appeared in the shots "with her fist raised". Nilar Thein also organised a march of roughly 500 protesters.

In August 2007, several key group members were arrested, including Min Ko Naing, Ko Ko Gyi, Min Zeya, Ko Jimmy, Pyone Cho, Arnt Bwe Kyaw and Mya Aye. Others went on the run, including Mie Mie, Htay Kywe, and Nilar Thein. Htay Kywe was among the last to be captured, leading The New York Times to describe him as "Burma's most-wanted man". On 13 October, he was arrested at a rubber plantation along with fellow group members Mie Mie, Zaw Htet Ko Ko, Aung Thu and Hein Htet.

Nilar Thein's long evasion of state security forces also received continuing international press coverage, as she had to leave her four-month-old daughter with relatives to hide safely. (Nilar Thein's husband, Ko Jimmy, had already been arrested). She was not apprehended until 10 September 2008, when she went to visit Ant Bwe Kyaw's mother.

== Trial and international reaction ==
On 11 November 2008, Htay Kywe, Min Ko Naing, Ko Jimmy, Nilar Thein, Mie Mie, and nine other 88 Generation members were convicted of four counts of "illegally using electronic media" and one count of "forming an illegal organisation", for a total sentence of 65 years in prison apiece. Min Zeya reportedly answered the judge, "Only 65 years?", and Mie Mie reportedly shouted, "We will never be frightened!" The group's photographer Zaw Htet Ko Ko and other members were given sentences ranging from three to eleven years' imprisonment. The Burmese government also accused the group of plotting terrorism and of being influenced by foreign powers, alleging that a private American group had delivered the 88 Generation Students US$30,000 the previous year via a Western embassy. An SPDC spokesperson also reported that the US Embassy had helped Htay Kywe to avoid arrest.

Amnesty International condemned the sentences and named them prisoners of conscience, calling for their immediate release. Human Rights Watch stated its belief that the group members were political prisoners and called for their immediate and unconditional release, as did Front Line. The same year as their sentencing, American Federation of Teachers awarded the 88 Generation Students Group the President's International Democracy Award "for its commitment to the struggle for democracy and freedom in Burma".

In November 2010, the nations of Australia, Austria, Belgium, Canada, Denmark, Finland, France, Germany, Greece, Italy, Netherlands, New Zealand, Norway, Spain, Sweden, Switzerland, Great Britain and the US submitted a draft resolution to the United Nations calling by name for Burma to release Min Ko Naing and other pro-democracy activists, among numerous other human-rights-related demands.

== Imprisonment and reports of abuse ==
After the sentencing, the 88 Generation Students Group members reportedly faced numerous hardships in prison. In 2008, Mie Mie's health was said to be deteriorating as a result of her imprisonment, due to spondylosis, arthritis, and an alleged lack of treatment for a heart condition. That same year, the US State Department warned that Min Ko Naing was reported to be at risk of blindness due to prison authorities deliberately withholding medical treatment. In January 2009, Nilar Thein's family heard second-hand information that she had developed a peptic ulcer and were concerned that her health might be deteriorating, and in December 2010, they reported that prison officials had barred them from seeing her, even to bring Nilar Thein's child for a visit. Htay Kywe's brother-in-law reported that Htay Kywe had lost weight in confinement, and was spending his prison term reading, meditating, and studying economics; Human Rights Watch stated that he was often kept in solitary confinement.

== Release ==
On 13 January 2012 a number of 88 Generation activists were released as part of a wider prisoner amnesty. 88 Generation activists released included Min Ko Naing, Nilar Thein, Ko Jimmy, Pyone Cho, Ant Bwe Kyaw, Ko Ko Gyi, Mar Mar Oo, Thet Thet Aung, and others.

== Response to Rohingya genocide ==
While 88 Generation activists have been lauded by western governments and organizations for their pro-democracy activism, some key members have been implicated in denying or defending acts of the Rohingya genocide (the ongoing persecution of Myanmar's mostly-Muslim Rohingya minority), largely opposed by western society.
