= Assistance Association for Political Prisoners =

Non-profit for Burmese political prisoners

- နိုင်ငံရေးအကျဉ်းသားများကူညီစောင့်ရှောက်ရေးအသင်း
- Abbreviation: AAPP
- Established: March 23, 2000; 26 years ago
- Purpose: Human rights, welfare of political prisoners
- Headquarters: Yangon, Myanmar
- Location: Mae Sot, Thailand
- Coordinates: 16.862938°N 96.188026°E
- Secretary: Tate Naing
- Joint-Secretary: Bo Kyi
- Website: aappb.org

Assistance Association of Political Prisoners (Burma) (Burmese: နိုင်ငံရေးအကျဉ်းသားများကူညီစောင့်ရှောက်ရေးအသင်း; abbreviated AAPP or AAPPB) is an independent non-profit organisation founded by Burmese former political prisoners living in exile. Mainly staffed by ex-political prisoners, its main aims are to provide assistance for other Burmese political prisoners (those in prison and those who have been released), and to document news related to them.

Its stated aims are “collecting information about political prisoners and prison conditions” and “giving assistance to political prisoners and their families, for example by providing food and medicines, or financial help to enable families to visit their loved ones in prison”.

== History ==
AAPP was founded in the Thai-Burma border town of Mae Sot by on 23 March 2000, the anniversary of the arrest of 1988 student leader Min Ko Naing. Since then, the organization has been run by former political prisoners, with an office and museum dedicated to political prisoners, opening inside Burma in Rangoon 2012. AAPP opened a larger office and museum in Rangoon in March 2018. A smaller office and museum is also located in Mae Sot, Thailand.

On 13 March 2023, AAPP received the 2023 Geuzenpenning award for the AAPP's "reliability in collecting, recording, and exposing human rights violations to both the people of Myanmar, and the global community."

On 31 August 2026, AAPP joint secretary Bo Kyi is awarded the 2026 Ramon Magsaysay Award for "his life’s work as a steadfast pursuit of truth, accountability, and justice. His enduring commitment reflects extraordinary moral courage, personal sacrifice, and an unwavering belief that democracy and human dignity are always worth defending—and that even in the face of oppression, the truth must be told, justice must be pursued, and the freedom to believe must be upheld and defended at all costs."

== Political prisoners in Burma ==
Freedom of expression is heavily curtailed in Burma, with the arbitrary use of laws such as the Foreign Exchange Regulation Act and high treason.

There were 2,203 political prisoners in jails across Burma, including monks, students, elected members of parliament and lawyers during SPDC regime. Many had been convicted for expressing views different from the government or for taking part in protests peacefully. As of June 2018, there are currently 245 political prisoners Following the executions of four pro-democracy activists in July 2022, AAPP estimated that 2,114 people have been killed by military forces.

=== Treatment of political prisoners in prison ===
Democracy activists have reported undergoing torture, including electric shocks, rape, iron rods rubbed on their shins until the flesh rubs off, severe beatings and solitary confinement.

In 2007, AAPP reported how prison hospitals become distribution centres for HIV/AIDS as prison patients were made to share needles and syringes for injections.

=== Treatment of political prisoners after release ===
Even after political prisoners are released, they continue to face ill treatment. The military intimidates and harasses ex-political prisoners in order to prevent them from participating political activities.

Such activities are intensified closer to or on politically sensitive occasions, such as the anniversary of the 8888 Popular Uprising, where former political prisoners are arrested, interrogated and detained without reason.

The military regime also attempts to isolate ex-political prisoners from society, for example by denying them economic and educational opportunities.

Other organisations that have been campaigning for political prisoners include Burma Campaign UK, Human Rights Watch and Amnesty International UK.

== Work ==
=== Research and documentation ===
Every month a chronology documenting ongoing human rights violations in Burma is published. The chronology entails a comprehensive list of those people awaiting trial for their political activities, updating monthly figures detailing the arrests, sentences, and releases of political activists, and reporting on those who are in poor health. The publication of our monthly chronology is catalogued from different media outlets and AAPP sources within Burma and provides a general overview of the current situation in Burma each month. A thematic month in review is also released, providing an in-depth look into events of the previous month.

The team also publishes research papers that outline key areas of concern for political prisoners inside Burma, as well as reports used to lobby against the government and build support amongst a network of human rights organizations. AAPP offers a reliable source of information and gives valuable advice and opinions to international researchers, advisers, organizations and journalists working on the protection of human rights in Burma.

=== Direct assistance for political prisoners ===
AAPP has been providing help to political prisoners, including emergency assistance for those with serious health problems. It has also given financial help to pay for the education of political prisoners’ children, and has helped to meet the costs of medical care for former political prisoners.

=== Campaigns ===
In 2009, AAPP collaborated with Forum for Democracy in Burma in a campaign Free Burma's Political Prisoners Now. The campaign, which started 13 March 2009, called for UN Secretary-General Ban Ki-moon to prioritise securing the release of all Burma's political prisoners.

On 15 June 2009, 677,254 signatures were personally delivered to Ban Ki-moon's office by a delegation of former political prisoners, human rights activists and family members of political prisoners. This was termed "the largest coordinated global action for Burma to date".

Recent campaigns have included World Torture Day, International Women's Day, Nelson Mandela International Day and Blue Shirt day in honour of former political prisoner U Win Tin.

=== Museums ===
AAPP has two small museums dedicated to remembering the sacrifices political prisoners have made in their fight for a free, democratic Burma. There is one museum in Rangoon, Burma the other is in Mae Sot, Thailand. The museums house a number of artifacts relating to political prisoners in Burma, including: photographs; prisoner records; a scale model of Insein prison; a replica prison cell; and items made and used by political activists in prison. The museum is free of charge, though for group visits an appointment on the website is requested. Recently AAPP launched a virtual museum tour.

=== Mental Health Assistance Programme ===
In 2011, AAPP started its Mental Health Assistance Programme, with the aim to build trust, improve, and raise awareness of mental health, and encourage participation in human rights promotion and the national reconciliation process. The programme started in Mae Sot, Thailand and expanded into Burma in 2013. to date, MHAP operates in 7 States within Burma and also in Mae Sot.

In October 2019 MHAP released its inaugural report on Treating Common Mental Health Disorders in Burma and the need for Comprehensive Mental Health Policies.

During the COVID-19 period AAPP's MHAP gave self-care and mental empowerment talks to people in quarantine centers and those volunteering to help alleviate the mental and economic stress, using the experience of political prisoners and their family members.

== Publications ==
AAPP releases thematic reports regularly exploring the pressing civil and political issues facing Burma during its democratic transition. These reports are published in Burmese and English and disseminated to international and domestic audiences. Below are hyperlinks to the English texts, the Burmese catalogue of texts can be found here - https://aappb.org/bu/category/annual-reports-burmese/

- Published September 2001, Spirit for Survival
- Published September 2004, Women Political Prisoners in Burma
- Published November 2004, Burma: A Land Where Buddhist MonksAre Disrobed and Detained in Dungeons
- Published May 2006, 8 Seconds of Silence: The Death of Democracy Behind Bars
- Published May 2008, Burma's Prisons and Labour Camps: Silent Killing Fields
- Published August 2008, The Role of Students in the 8888 People's Uprising in Burma
- Published March 2010, The Role of Political Prisoners in the National Reconciliation Process
- Published 2011, Torture, Political Prisoners and the Un-Rule of Law
- Published July 2015, How to Defend the Defenders?A Report on the Situation of Human Rights Defenders in Burma andAppropriate Protection Mechanisms
- Published May 2016, “After release I had to restart my life from the beginning” The Experiences of Ex-political Prisoners in Burma and Challenges to Reintegration
- Published September 2016, Prison Conditions in Burma and The Potential for Prison Reform
- Published March 2018 Activism & Agency: The Female Experience of Political Imprisonment
- Published December 2018, “Prison Overcrowding and the Need for Urgent Reform”
- Published July 2019, Ratification of International Treaties
- Published November 2019, The Systematic use of Torture by Totalitarian Regimes in Burma & the Experiences of Political Prisoners
- Published May 2020, Of 20 years, the Journey to commemorate twenty years since the founding of AAPP
- Published August 2020, Prison Reform with Key Population Coalition
- Published September 2020, Mapping Injustice in Myanmar chronicles human rights violations over a 10-year period from 2010 to 2020.
- Published March 23, 2022, Political Prisoners Experience in Interrogation, Judiciary, and Incarceration Since Burma’s Illegitimate Military Coup
