= Htay Kywe (activist) =

Burmese democracy activist

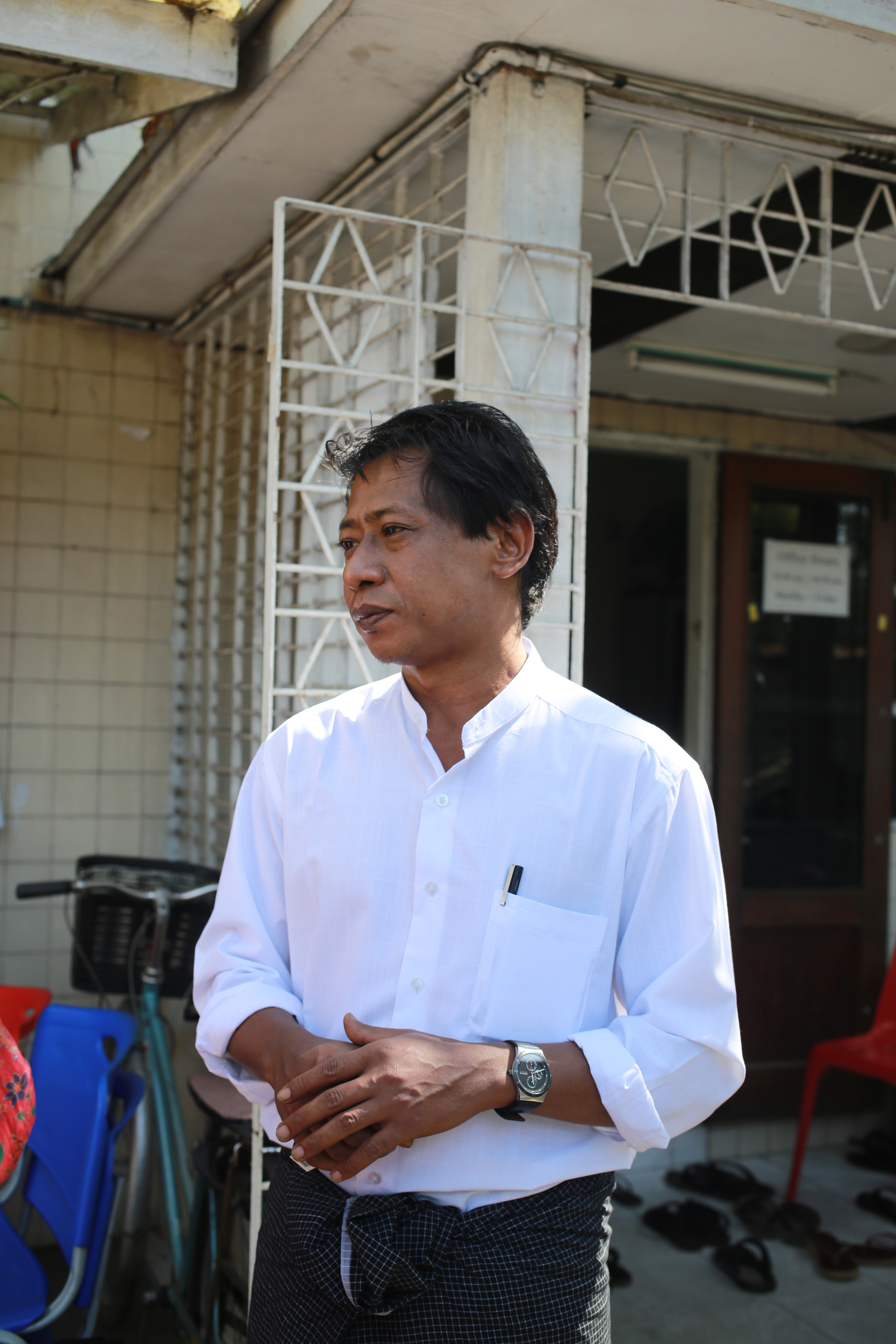
- Htay Kywe in front of 88 Generation Students' Office in Yangon, Myanmar.
- Born: June 12, 1968 (age 58); Rangoon, Burma
- Education: B.Sc. Geology (2nd year), Rangoon Arts & Sciences University
- Parent(s): U Kywe; Mi Mi Lay

Htay Kywe (Burmese: ဌေးကြွယ်, pronounced [tʰé tɕwɛ̀]) is a repeatedly-imprisoned Burmese pro-democracy activist who was considered a prisoner of conscience by Amnesty International. BBC News describes him as a key member of the 8888 Generation movement.

== Background and role in 1988 protests ==
Htay Kywe was the third son of U Kywe and Mi Mi Lay of Yangon; he went on to study geology at the University of Yangon. In 1988, his second year at the university, he became an early organizer in the widespread protests against military ruler Ne Win. On 16 March, he helped organize what the democracy movement would later name the "Red Bridge protest," during which riot police allegedly killed more than 100 protesters. On 22 March, he and his brother Win Kywe were arrested for their role and detained in Insein Prison until July. These protests culminated in a general strike which began on 8 August, giving the "8888 Uprising" its name. Htay Kywe acted as a spokesman for the movement, giving an interview to BBC News.

Following the military coup by Saw Maung's State Law and Order Restoration Council, Htay Kywe was one of the student delegates to meet with the general to seek reconciliation.

== Post-election arrests ==
In May 1990, Burma held its first multi-party elections since 1960, with Aung San Suu Kyi's National League for Democracy winning 392 of 492 available seats. However, the military annulled the results and soon arrested a number of opposition figures, among them Htay Kywe, who was arrested at his home in Yangon in July 1991. On December 30, 1991, he received a fifteen-year prison term, and he remained jailed until 2004. After his release, he remained active in the pro-democracy movement, co-founding the 88 Generation Students Group.

In September 2006, he was detained along with fellow 88 Generation Students Group members Min Ko Naing, Ko Ko Gyi, Pyone Cho and Min Zeya, in advance of Burma's 2006 National Convention. In January 2007, they were released, without official explanation for either their original arrest or their sudden release.

== Role in 2007 anti-government protests and arrest ==
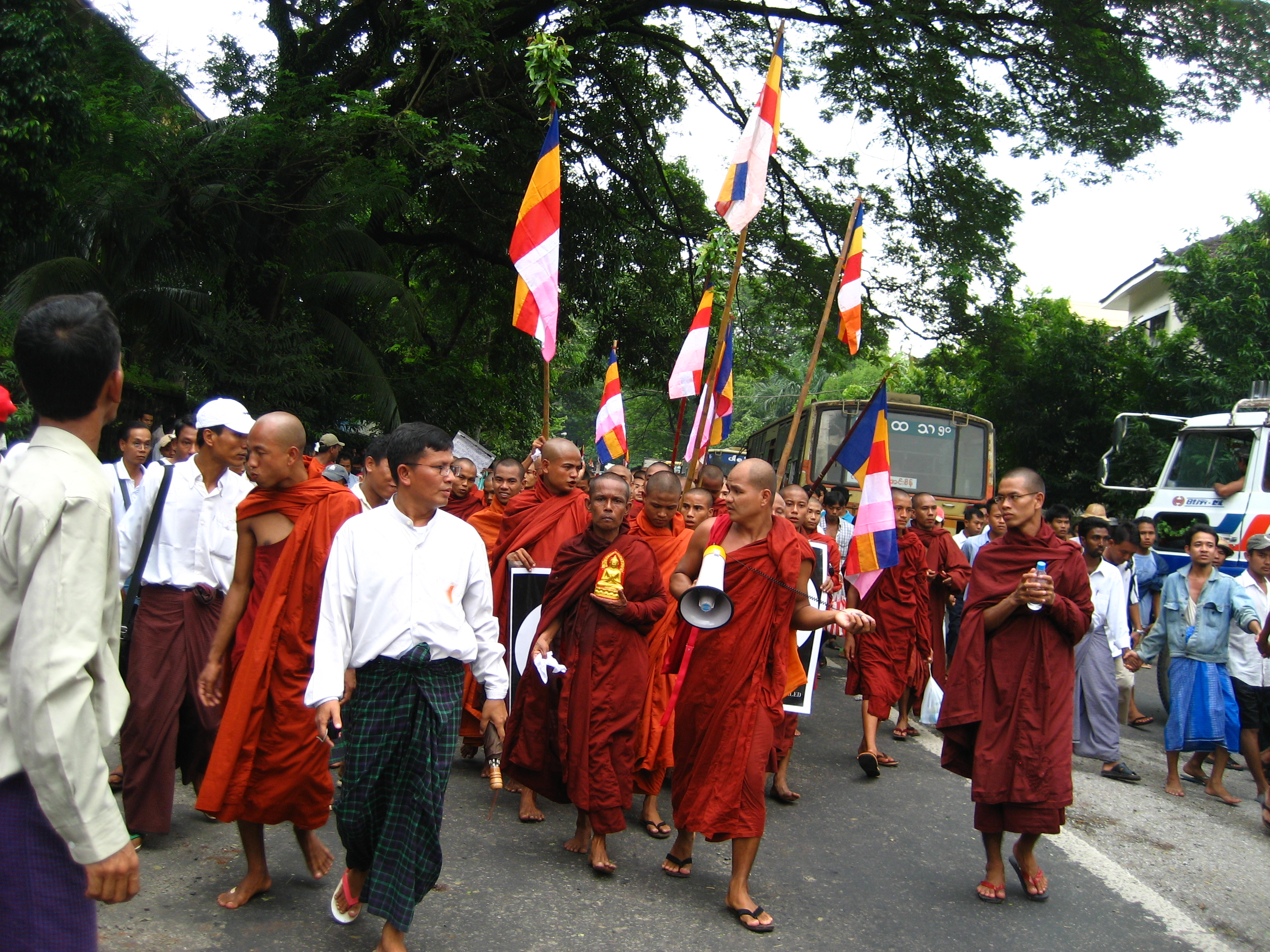
Monks protesting in Yangon, carrying the Buddhist flag

When rising fuel and commodity prices led to widespread unrest in Yangon in August 2007, the 88 Generation Students Group played a major role in organizing protests. The largest of these rallies drew over one hundred thousand protesters, most notably a number of Buddhist monks, giving the uprising the popular nickname "The Saffron Revolution" for the color of their robes.

Following a government crackdown on protestors, members of the 88 Generation Students Group were swiftly arrested. Htay Kywe was among the last to be captured, leading the New York Times to describe him as Burma's "most-wanted man". Security forces posted his photograph in hotels, raided homes, and searched buses for him at checkpoints. He was finally arrested on 13 October 2007 when he emerged from hiding to visit his mother, who was suffering from cancer; when she died a month later, he was not allowed to attend her funeral.

== Trial and imprisonment ==
On 11 November 2008, Htay Kywe and thirteen other activists were convicted of four counts of "illegally using electronic media" and one count of "forming an illegal organization", for a total sentence of 65 years in prison. Other charges against Htay Kywe are still pending. The Burmese government further accused Htay Kywe of being influenced by foreign powers, alleging that a private American group had delivered him $30,000 the previous year.

Htay Kywe is serving his sentence in Buthitaung Prison in Rakhine State. In August 2010, he issued a statement through family members protesting the upcoming 2010 general election, stating that it would be "insignificant without the participation of pro-democracy leader Aung San Suu Kyi." His brother-in-law reported that Htay Kywe had lost weight in confinement and was spending his prison term reading, meditating, and studying economics. He is often kept in solitary confinement.

== International response ==
Htay Kywe's repeated arrests were condemned by numerous human rights organizations. Amnesty International considered him a prisoner of conscience and called for his immediate release. Human Rights Watch called for him to be exonerated and freed, as did Front Line.

The US State Department protested Htay Kywe's arrest, and British Deputy Prime Minister Nick Clegg declared that "this Government will not rest until Htay Kywe and other political prisoners like him are free." United Nations Special Rapporteur Paulo Sérgio Pinheiro also called for the activist's release.

== Release ==
Htay Kywe was released on 13 January 2012 in a mass presidential pardon of political prisoners.

== See also ==
- Min Ko Naing
- Mya Aye
- Nilar Thein
