= Burma Global Action Network =

The Burma Global Action Network, also known as BGAN, is a worldwide Internet-based organization. It was founded by the "Support The Monks' Protest In Burma" group on Facebook.com with 400,000 members. Its motto states, "supporting the Burmese monks and civilians through internet activism by bringing solidarity and unity to the Free Burma Movement using the latest social networking and internet technology." Burma Global Action Network (BGAN) is a new organization promoting the struggle for justice and democracy in Burma, operating in conjunction with other, more established groups. Founded in the wake of the 2007 Burmese anti-government protests, BGAN has initiated and organized various actions designed to raise public awareness about the situation in Burma and put pressure on governments and other stakeholders to take action on Burmese issues. It is composed of moderators from BGAN's Facebook.com group, "Support the Monks' Protest in Burma," founded by Jack Hidary, Imran Jamal, Sophie Lwin and other former BGAN's staff including Alex Bookbinder. Current members of the group includes Sophie Lwin, Imran Jamal, Nickie Sekera and Tim Aye-Hardy. This platform was established in late September, 2007, to raise awareness of the 2007 Burmese anti-government protests. It soon became an unfounded success: at its peak, it had nearly 500,000 members, and united disparate individuals and organizations around the globe working together for the goal of a free Burma. BGAN is composed of volunteers from around the world with different nationalities and backgrounds. In 2007 BGAN's Facebook group was the largest Facebook advocacy group and was one of the first organizations to utilize social media for global advocacy and action coordination.

== Achievements ==
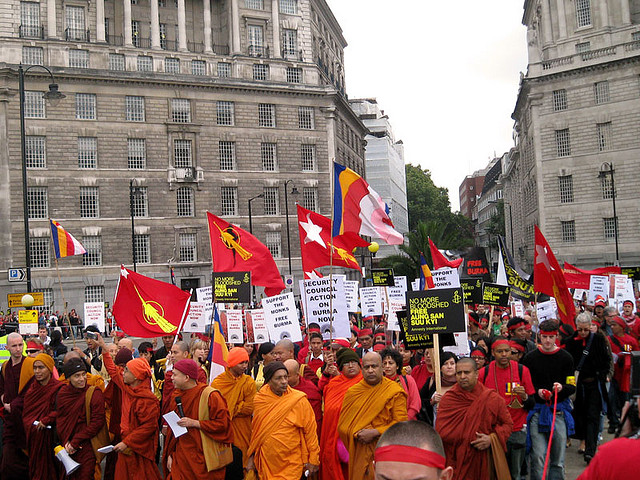
Protesters march in London

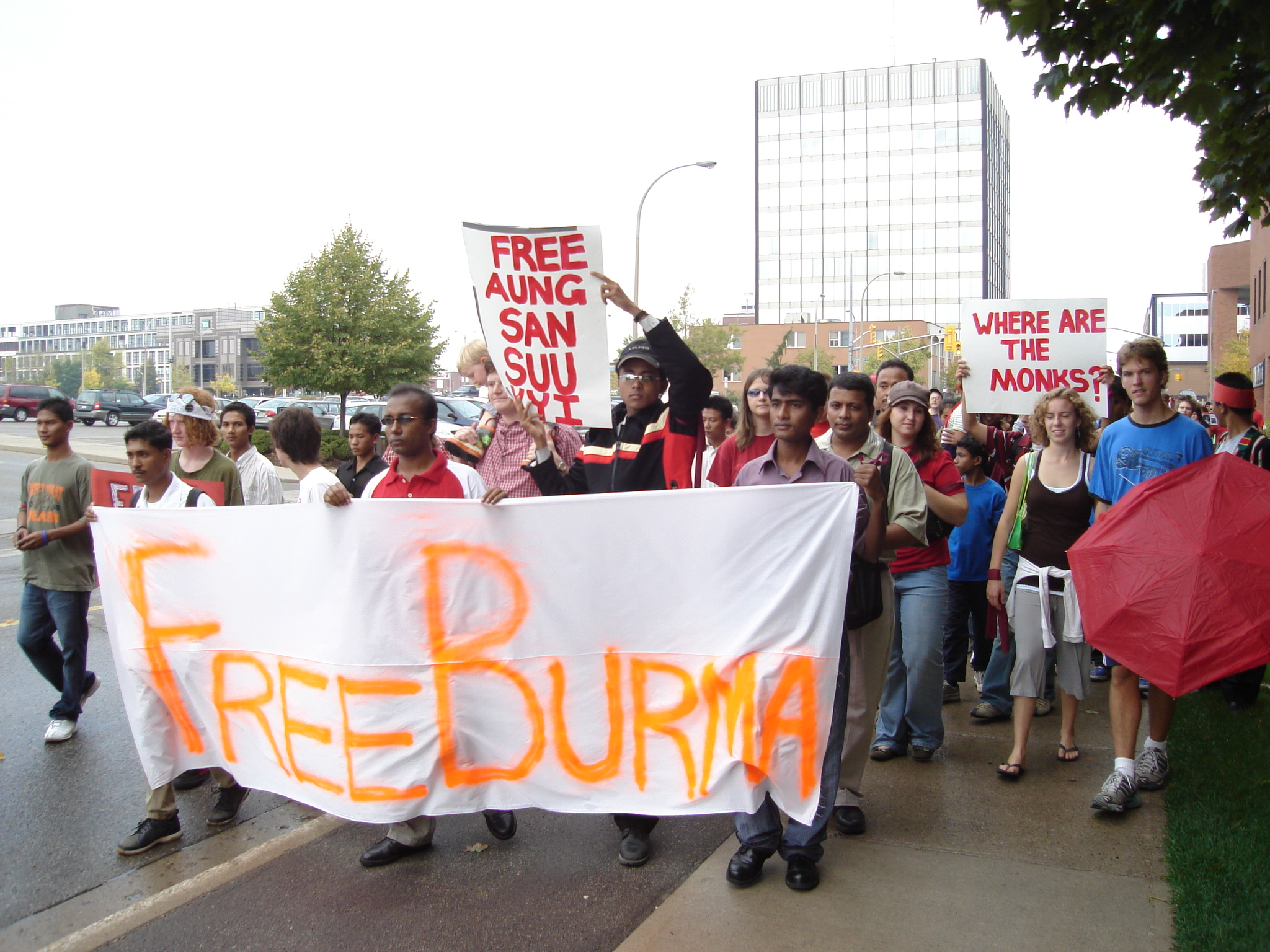
Protesters march in Kitchener, Ontario

- In conjunction with the Burma Campaign UK, Canadian Friends of Burma, the US Campaign for Burma and Avaaz.org, as well as countless local partners, a Global Day of Action for Burma was held on October 6, 2007, in cities worldwide. The London demonstration alone had more than 10,000 participants; tens of thousands participated in events worldwide. It remains one of the largest simultaneous events coordinated primarily over the internet, and can be a considered a significant milestone in the history of internet activism for its novel usage of social networking technology.
- It also coordinated a global day of action with the emphasis on freeing Burma's political prisoners. "Aung San Suu Kyi Day" was held on October 24, 2007, which marked the date on which Aung San Suu Kyi had spent 12 years under house arrest.
- Its most significant user-uploaded media campaign is the website Don’t Forget Burma. Designed to combat the lull in Burma-related coverage in the international media following the crackdown on demonstrators in October, Don't Forget Burma was designed as a viral campaign where concerned citizens can upload messages of support for the Burmese cause and try to keep Burma in the media spotlight and public consciousness.
- It also launched a campaign urging consumers to boycott oil companies Chevron Corporation and Total S.A., and encouraging those companies to divest of their substantial assets in the country, which provide a direct pipeline of support to the military dictatorship at the expense of the Burmese people.
- Berkman Center for Internet & Society At Harvard Law School invited BGAN to its "Berkman in Turkey: Internet And Democracy Digital Activism Event" in Istanbul, Turkey in February 2008 to speak about BGAN's "Support The Monks' Protest In Burma" group on facebook.com's success in globally spreading and mobilizing democracy activism using social networking.
- In conjunction with the Burma Campaign UK, Canadian Friends of Burma, the US Campaign for Burma, Info Birmanie, as well as countless local partners, a Global Day of Action for Burma a call for Humanitarian Intervention was held on May 17, 2008, in cities worldwide. A response to Military Than Shwe and the junta's blockade of aid to the Cyclone Nargis aftermath victims, the international community called for a Humanitarian intervention to get aid into the hardest hit areas of Burma.
- Facebook, Google, YouTube, MTV, Howcast, Columbia Law School and the United States Department of State invited BGAN to its three-day "Alliance of Youth Movements Summit" in New York City, New York at Columbia Law School in December 2008 to speak about BGAN's success in mobilizing a global movement for Burma and its success with their "Support The Monks' Protest In Burma" group/page on facebook.com in globally spreading and mobilizing democracy activism using social networking. Only ten organizations from around the world were invited to attend such as Save Darfur Coalition and Invisible Children. Major figureheads such as Whoopi Goldberg of ABC's The View, Dustin Moskovitz, Co-Founder, Facebook, James K. Glassman, Undersecretary for Public Diplomacy and Public Affairs, U.S. Department of State, Oscar Morales, Founder, One Million Voices Against the FARC, Luke Russert, MSNBC, Matthew Waxman, associate professor of law, Columbia Law School. The event was hosted at Columbia Law School with MTV hosting a red carpet party for the attendants at their time square New York location.

== Messages Of Support ==
It received messages from Celebrities, politicians, and Nobel Peace Prize recipients.

- A message of Support from Nobel Peace Prize winner Elie Wiesel:

I am thrilled to learn that so many young people, more than 350,000 so far, have so movingly responded to the Burmese people's courageous struggle for freedom and dignity. You are their hope and ours.

— Elie Wiesel

- From Yoko Ono Lennon, Issued via a Facebook.com group, "Support the Monks" Protest In Burma

There is no way we will forget you. Now that your work of letting the world know is done, I wish you to stay alive in peace and health. The world desperately need your wise and gentle spirit. You help all people of this planet by just being. Please try to be alive for the world. I will try the same. With my deepest respect and love, Yoko Ono Lennon.

— October 3, 2007

- British Prime minister Gordon Brown - October 17, 2007,

To a delegation that included BGAN's former UK Coordinator, Johnny Chatterton:

I'll do everything I can to help the people of Burma

== Boycott Chevron and Total Oil Companies ==
BGAN has launched a campaign urging consumers to boycott oil companies Chevron Corporation and Total S.A., and encouraging those companies to divest of their substantial assets in the country, which provide a direct pipeline of support to the military dictatorship at the expense of the Burmese people.

== Cyclone Nargis ==
It has recently created a Facebook.com page called Support the Relief Efforts for Burma (Myanmar) Cyclone Disaster Victims with 11,500 plus members in response to the Cyclone Nargis. This group receives the latest pictures, and information out to the rest of the world of the apparent 'real' situation inside Burma of the Cyclone aftermath.

In conjunction with the Burma Campaign UK, Canadian Friends of Burma, the US Campaign for Burma, Info Birmanie, as well as countless local partners, a Global Day of Action for Burma a call for Humanitarian Intervention was held on May 17, 2008, in cities worldwide. A response to Military Than Shwe and the junta's blockade of aid to the Cyclone Nargis aftermath victims, the international community called for a Humanitarian intervention to get aid into the hardest hit areas of Burma.
