= Nant (disambiguation) =

NAnt is a free and open source software tool for automating software build processes.

Nant may also refer to:

== Places ==
- Nant, Aveyron, France, a commune
- Nant (Bex, Switzerland), an alpine pasture
- Nantes, often cyrillised as Нант

== People ==
- Llef o'r Nant (circa 1782-1863), Welsh Anglican priest
- Nant Bwa Bwa Phan (21st century), Burmese politician
- Twm o'r Nant (1739-1810), Welsh-language dramatist
