= Zoya Phan =

Burmese activist (born 1980)

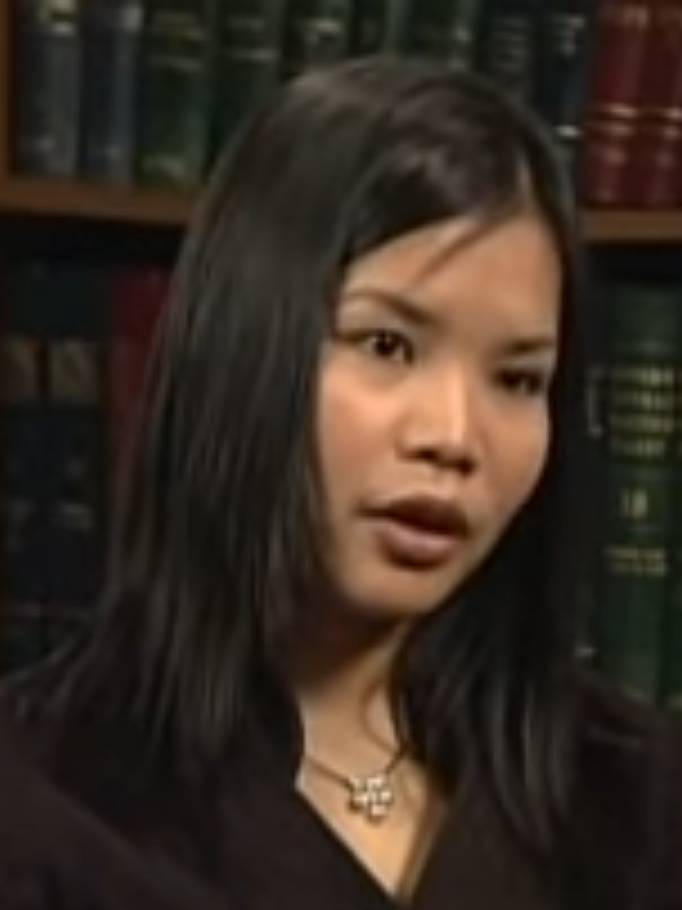
- Zoya Phan in 2010
- Born: 27 October 1980 (age 45); Manerplaw, Burma
- Education: Bangkok University; University of East Anglia
- Occupation: Human rights activist

Zoya Phan (born 27 October 1980) is a Burmese political activist. She resides in the United Kingdom, and is the Campaign Manager of the human rights organization Burma Campaign UK. She was an outspoken critic of the Burmese government when it was under direct military rule, repeatedly calling for democratic reform in Burma, as well as economic sanctions from both the British government and the United Nations. Following political changes in the country from 2011, she has continued to campaign for international action to end ongoing human rights violations, especially regarding the use of rape and sexual violence against ethnic women by the Burmese Army.

In April 2009, she published her autobiography, Little Daughter, in the UK, which was published under the title Undaunted in the United States in May 2010.

== Biography ==
=== Early life ===
Zoya Phan was born in Manerplaw, then the headquarters of the Karen National Union (KNU), on 27 October 1980, the second of her parents' three biological children. Her father was Padoh Mahn Sha Lah Phan, General Secretary of the KNU, and her mother was Nant Kyin Shwe, a former soldier for the KNU. The name Zoya came from her father, who named her after the Russian World War II hero Zoya Kosmodemyanskaya; he said he saw several parallels between the Soviet fight against the Nazis and the ongoing Karen conflict with the Burmese government. She spent most of her early life in the Karen village Per He Lu, an hour's walk away from the KNU headquarters in Manerplaw. When she was six she began to spend more time in Manerplaw, and it was there she had her first exposure to the fighting in Burma, as land mine victims frequently went to the hospital there for treatment.

When Zoya was 14, the Burmese army attacked Manerplaw and Per He Lu, forcing her and her family to run to Mae Ra Moe, a refugee camp just across the border in Thailand. In 1996, she and her family managed to cross back into Burma, settling in a Karen village called Ther Waw Thaw (The New Village). Halfway through the school year, she nearly died of an unknown disease, only recovering after weeks of being on an IV drip. In March 1997, the village came under attack by the Burmese army, and she and her family fled back across the border to another refugee camp called Noh Poe, near a Thai-Karen village. After ten months, Zoya and her older sister, Nant Bwa Bwa Phan, were able to get to Mae Sot in Thailand for three months, hoping for a chance to go to a university in Australia, but when this fell through they decided to complete their education at another refugee camp, Mae La. In 1999, Zoya and Bwa Bwa took an Open Society Institute (OSI) exam to earn a scholarship to go to a university. Both of them passed the first time but there was only enough space for Bwa Bwa, who went to Bangkok University, and Zoya had to retake the exam the following year. While waiting she caught cerebral malaria, and almost died a second time. In 2000, she retook the OSI exam and was granted an OSI scholarship and a scholarship from Prospect Burma, giving her the chance to join her sister studying in Bangkok.

=== Bangkok University ===
At Bangkok University, Zoya enrolled in the business administration program, as that was the only program her scholarship permitted her to enter. Zoya and her sister had no papers, and like other students from Burma had to maintain a low profile to avoid the scrutiny of the Thai police. During her second year, she and Bwa Bwa helped to secretly organize a support group for other Karen students, collecting money to give a prize to a student in one of the refugee camps. In her third year, Zoya entered a three-month internship in the consumer department of Telecoms Asia, and was offered a position after she completed her degree. After three years, she graduated with a Bachelor of Arts in business administration. Upon returning to the refugee camps, she and several other Karen students from their organization illegally crossed the Burmese border to Papun so they could personally deliver their prize to the winner and to document what was happening to Karen people still in Burma. Soon after they returned, Zoya considered accepting Telecoms Asia's offer, but ultimately accepted a scholarship to study in the United Kingdom with her sister, while her younger brother Slone went to study in Canada. Before she left, her father took in two Burmese child soldiers who were sent to kill both him and Zoya; although they failed, it was the first time the Burmese government had specifically targeted her. Her mother died a few weeks later, and Zoya considered staying to help her father; however, he insisted that she go.

== Political activism ==
When Zoya was in her early teens, her father frequently used her name as a pseudonym for his writings, something she only found out about many years later. She first saw her father speak while her family was in Ther Waw Thaw, inspiring her to become an activist herself. Upon entering the UK in 2005, she began volunteering with the Burma Campaign UK. She attended one rally in traditional Karen dress, and was asked on the spot to be the master of ceremonies. She accepted, and soon afterward, she was asked to do an interview with the BBC, and rapidly became a sought-out speaker for issues related to Burma and Burma-UK relations.

Zoya accused the military-run Burmese government of using child soldiers and violent repression tactics, including torture, ethnic cleansing, religious discrimination, and killing of political opponents and protesters. She says that this has had a particularly devastating effect on the Karen, who are an ethnic minority and around 40% Christian and 20% animist in predominantly Buddhist Burma. In addition, she accused the Burmese government of extreme corruption, saying that the leaders of the military junta have intentionally mismanaged the economy to benefit themselves. She has called for both the UN and the British government to place economic sanctions on Burma, and to cease all arms deals with the government. In 2010, she sharply denounced the international community's response to the 2010 Burmese elections, saying it was overly focused on very small changes that might occur while ignoring the fact that their impact would be minimal and would not lead to any significant increase in freedom. While Aung San Suu Kyi was under house arrest, she repeatedly urged the UN and the ASEAN Intergovernmental Commission on Human Rights to work towards her release.

In 2007, she spoke at a Conservative Party conference, calling for the British government to cease trade with the Burmese government, and expressed her anger at the British government's continued inaction towards Burma even in the face of human rights abuses. She was also very critical of the UN for failing to impose an arms embargo on Burma after Russia and China blocked a Security Council motion. Later, she met with then-British prime minister Gordon Brown to encourage imposition of a trade embargo with the Burmese.

In 2008, she accused the Burmese government of using Cyclone Nargis to proliferate ethnic cleansing. She said that the government's lack of warning people about the impending cyclone and refusal of foreign aid to assist with medical treatment and rebuilding lead to thousands of unnecessary deaths. In addition, she harshly criticised Western governments, especially the United Kingdom, for refusing to push further when Burma agreed to allow relief workers into small parts of the country, saying that they did not do enough to hold the Burmese government accountable for its lack of response to the cyclone. She pointed out that the junta had already bent to international pressure by allowing workers in at all, and said that the international community should have pushed harder, which she said would have forced the junta to allow more essential aid. Ultimately, she said the international reaction was symbolic of the past several decades of inaction towards political and human rights abuses in Burma.

In May 2011, she spoke at the Oslo Freedom Forum, and said that despite the Burmese government's claims of reform, the changes were only cosmetic and no real change had occurred in Burma. She also urged the UN to judge the Burmese government by their actions instead of their official statements. In March 2012, she spoke at the fourth Geneva Summit for Human Rights and Democracy and continued to maintain that the Burmese government's reforms were insufficient and that international pressure and sanctions were still necessary. After Suu Kyi's National League for Democracy won 40 of 45 parliamentary seats in April of that year, Zoya urged people not to become overly optimistic, echoing Suu Kyi's statement that far from being the complete transition to democracy, this was only the very beginning of the process. She also stated that, despite assurances from Thein Sein that reforms would take place, attacks on minority groups in Burma were only increasing in frequency, further bolstering the need for caution.

In addition to her work with the Burma Campaign UK, Zoya is the coordinator of the European Karen Network, secretary of the Karen Community Association (UK), and serves of the board of the Austrian Burma Centre.

Writing in the UK newspaper The Independent in 2015, following election in Burma which the NLD won by a landslide, she warned that the struggle for human rights in the country was still not over.

=== Little Daughter ===
In speeches and interviews, Zoya frequently speaks about her experiences to describe conditions in Burma. In 2009, she worked with Damien Lewis to publish her autobiography, Little Daughter: a Memoir of Survival in Burma and the West, 2009. It is published by Simon & Schuster. In May 2010, it was published in the United States under the title Undaunted: My Struggle for Freedom and Survival in Burma. She said that the goal of her book was to share her story as a Karen living in Burma, and to raise international awareness of the ongoing fighting and human rights abuses in Burma, especially in the east, which she says does not receive enough attention. At the end of the book, she also expresses her extreme scepticism over the upcoming elections, criticising the UN and governments who believe that real reform will be attained. She maintains that the situation in Burma is exactly the same as when she fled the country, and that only pressure and sanctions from other countries will bring about the reform necessary to create democracy within Burma. The book has received positive reviews from papers such as The Globe and Mail and The Independent.

== Personal life ==
Because Zoya had entered the UK with a falsified passport, she was almost deported, but was allowed to stay while applying for refugee status. Two years after her initial application, after applying for judicial review in August 2007, the British government granted it to her. After delivering her first speeches for the Burma Campaign UK, a radio transmission was intercepted, which contained a Burmese government's hit list with her name on it. On 14 February 2008, just before she received her MA from the University of East Anglia, Zoya's father was assassinated by agents of the Burmese junta. Despite her name still being on the Burmese government's hit list, she and her family decided to attend his funeral in They Bey Hta, just inside Kayin State in Burma. Following this, Zoya and her remaining family set up the Phan Foundation, which aims to fight poverty, promote education and human rights, and protect the culture of the Karen people of Burma. She received her MA in politics and development from the University of East Anglia in May 2008. Today, she resides in London, UK.

Zoya has two brothers and one sister. Say Say, her older brother, was adopted by her parents when she was four months old, and her younger brother Slone Phan was born when she was two. Nant Bwa Bwa Phan, her older sister, is the UK representative of the Karen National Union. Slone lives in Manitoba, Canada, where he studied at the University of Manitoba and became active in the Manitoba Interfaith Immigration Council, an organization assisting refugees coming into Manitoba.

== Awards and recognition ==
In 2009, Zoya became a TED Fellow. In March 2010, she was honored as a Young Global Leader by the World Economic Forum (WEF).
