= Mun Awng =

Burmese musician and pro-democracy activist

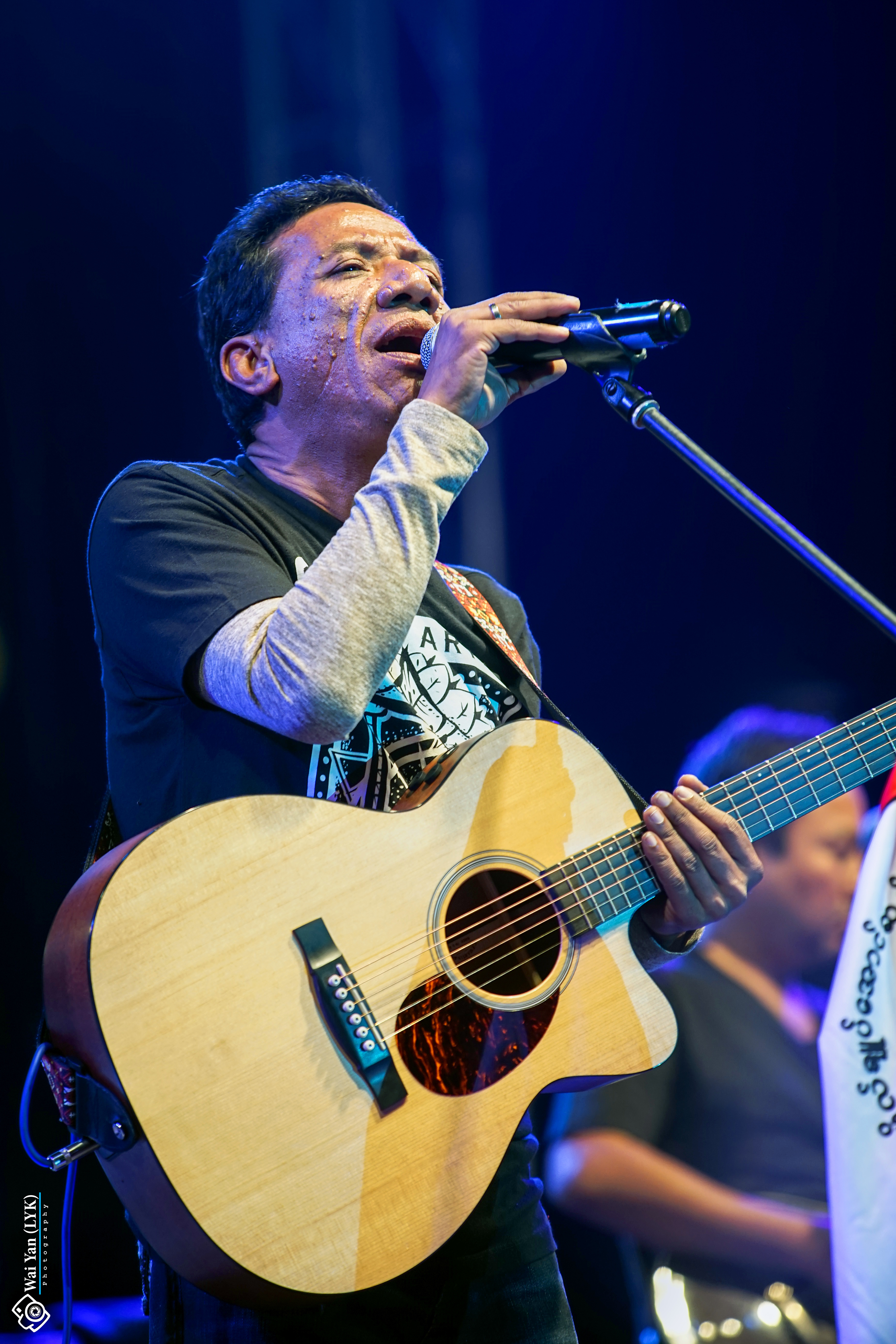
Mun Awng performing in Mandalay.

Mun Awng (Burmese: မွန်းအောင်; born 1960) is a Kachin singer, songwriter, and pro-democracy activist.

== Background ==
Mun Awng was born Myitkyina, in Kachin State in the north of Burma. He is part of the Christian minority, and grew up singing in church. Awng became a popular singer and musician in Burma during the 1980s. Due to having participated in anti-government demonstrations in 1988, he was forced to leave Burma in February 1993, having previously lived in camps on Three Pagodas Pass on the Thai border with other students.

He moved to Norway in 1996 to work with the opposition Democratic Voice of Burma radio and television broadcaster, which broadcasts from Oslo. He lived in Eidsvoll, Norway with his partner and daughter, working in the surface treatment department of a wood product factory.

Mun Awng returned to visit Burma in 2015 after initially having his visa denied by Burmese embassy officials in Bangkok.

== Music ==
Mun Awng's music has been described as a mix of Western style rock music and east Asian ballads. He, and other Burmese rock musicians, were not given permission by the government to perform at public venues, and instead performed within university dormitories, with the women's dormitories of Rangoon University being noted as popular makeshift venues. His music has frequently had political themes, and is noted as having been utilised in anti-government demonstrations in 1988, 1996, and in 2007. "8/82 Inya" has been noted as an anthem of the 1988 protests; the song was named after a Rangoon student accommodation building.

Even under the scrutiny of the Burmese censorship board, the Press Scrutiny and Registration Division, Awng managed to produce one album a year in Burma, with his production team having utilised bribery to get his songs approved by officials. He occasionally performs his music for Burmese exiles in other countries.

While still in Burma in 1992, Mun Awng released an album recorded in a makeshift studio in the refugee camp where he lived. This album, called Battle for Peace, was released from Thailand, and then smuggled into Burma on cassette tapes and played on Burmese-language radio stations broadcasting from abroad, as it was banned by the government.

Mun Awng performed at a charity concert at the Nihon Seinenkan hall in Tokyo with Shoukichi Kina and Champloose in 1998, to raise money for the Burmese Border Consortium, a charity that distributes aid to refugees along the Thai-Burma border. He rewrote Kina's song Hana with Burmese lyrics.

On 3 March 2015, he performed his first concert in Burma after over 25 years in support of his latest album Peace Raindrops, which was recorded in Chiang Mai with professional musicians from Burma. He had been wanting to write the album for 15 years, but was unable to until 2015 due to financial problems and issues with production. Many of the songs were written by members of the Mizzima Hline Band, whom he had previously recorded with. The concert was intended to support ethnic Kachin refugees.

Mun Awng performed a solo concert in support of the 2021 Spring Revolution in April 2022, and voiced his support for the armed revolution.

== For the Lady ==
In 2004 Mun Awng contributed to For the Lady, a compilation album created to raise funds for the US Campaign for Burma. Together with well-known musicians such as U2, Avril Lavigne and Talib Kweli, Mun Awng helped create the album which was dedicated to the then-arrested Burmese democracy activist Aung San Suu Kyi. Mun Awng performed the album's final track, "Tempest of Blood", which was co-written by Min Ko Naing whilst they were in hiding.

== Albums (Music Series) ==
Mun Awng's published albums, known popularly in Myanmar as Music Series, in chronological order, are:

- Deviousness of Cincamana (1980)
  - Producer: Zinyaw Taythanthwin
  - Band: Medium Wave
  - Songwriters: Ko Nay Win, Maung Maung, Ko Ye Lwin, Maung Thit Minn, Naing Minn, and Mun Awng
- 8/82 Inya (1984)
  - Producer: Zinyaw Mandalay Taythanthwin
  - Band: The Rhythm
  - Songwriters: Ko Nay Win, Maung Maung, Ye Lwin, Yar Pyae, Han Zaw, Awa Khawram, and Mun Awng
- Moe Lone Hmine (1985)
  - Producer: Zinyaw Mandalay Taythanthwin
  - Band: The Rhythms of the Mediumwave Music
  - Songwriters: Ko Maung Maung, Ko Nay Win, Ko Ye Lwin, Maung Thit Minn, Khin Maung Toe, and Chit Ko
- Let the Longing Nights Be Over (1987)
  - Producer: Zinyaw Mandalay Taythanthwin
  - Band: Medium Wave
  - Songwriters: Ko Nay Win, Maung Maung, Ye Lwin, Maung Thit Minn, Naing Minn, Ko Phyoe, and Aung Naing (Da-Tu)
- Battle for Peace (1992)
  - Songwriters: Mun Awng and Htoo Eain Thin
- Path to Freedom (1998)
  - Band: Mun Awng and Friends in Norway
  - Songwriter: Mun Awng
- The Pollinating Night - Live Performance
  - Band: The Rhythm
  - Songwriters: Ko Nay Win, Maung Maung, Ye Lwin, Maung Thit Minn, Aung Naing (Da-Tu), Awa Khawram, Khin Maung Toe, and Htoo Eain Thin
- Rain Drops of Peace (2016)
  - Band: The Rhythm
  - Songwriters: Ko Ye Lwin, Ko Nay Win, Ko Aung Win, Ko De Chit Myo, and Mun Awng
