= For the Lady =

Compilation album
- Released: October 26, 2004
- Label: Rhino

For the Lady: Dedicated to Freeing Aung San Suu Kyi and the Courageous People of Burma is a benefit CD set with proceeds dedicated to freeing Aung San Suu Kyi, the Burmese opposition leader who was then under house arrest, and the people of Burma. It was released by Rhino Records on October 26, 2004. Sale proceeds of the double CD set went to the U.S. Campaign for Burma, a 501(c)(3) benefit campaign, which organised the creation of the album.

== Background ==
All tracks on the album were donated by the artists, including the never-before-released live versions of Better Man by Pearl Jam, Lonely Soldier by Damien Rice and Get You In by Better Than Ezra. Let Freedom Ring, by Tom Morello's solo project The Nightwatchman, is also exclusive to the album. Sting contributed a Spanish version of Fragile (Fragilidad).

Walk On, first featured on All That You Can't Leave Behind by U2, is dedicated to Aung San Suu Kyi, and was banned by the Myanmar military junta.

The final track on the album, Tempest of Blood, was written by Min Ko Naing who had then been imprisoned for 15 years for his student activism. The song was performed by Mun Awng, who had escaped Burma to Norway.

== Track listing ==
=== Disc 1 ===
#	Title	Artist	Length
1.	"Walk On"	U2	4:55
2.	"Better Man" (Live)	Pearl Jam	4:25
3.	"In My Place"	Coldplay	3:48
4.	"In the Way"	Ani DiFranco	5:17
5.	"No Lies, Just Love"	Bright Eyes	5:55
6.	"Drive" (Live)	R.E.M.	4:27
7.	"Complicated"	Avril Lavigne	4:05
8.	"Around My Way"	Talib Kweli featuring John Legend	4:51
9.	"Unfolding Grace"	Lili Haydn	5:45
10.	"Here Comes the Flood"	Peter Gabriel	4:31
11.	"Motherland"	Natalie Merchant	4:43
12.	"Cuando Los Angeles Lloran"	Maná	5:06
13.	"Paper Airplanes"	Rebecca Fanya	4:24
14.	"Oppression" (Live)	Ben Harper	4:28

=== Disc 2 ===
#	Title	Artist	Length
1.	"Freedom" (Live)	Paul McCartney	3:32
2.	"Let Freedom Ring"	The Nightwatchman	4:46
3.	"Wonderful Tonight"	Eric Clapton	3:40
4.	"Fragilidad"	Sting	3:55
5.	"Angel From Montgomery" (Live)	Bonnie Raitt	4:52
6.	"Lonely Soldier" (Live)	Damien Rice	4:25
7.	"The Cage"	Travis	3:05
8.	"Keep It Together"	Guster	3:43
9.	"Memories and Lies"	Hourcast	4:00
10.	"Perfect World" (Live)	Indigo Girls	3:35
11.	"Get You In" (Live)	Better Than Ezra	3:52
12.	"So Sad, So Lonely"	Matchbox Twenty	3:31
13.	"Tempest of Blood"	Mun Awng	4:45
