= Global Day of Action for Burma =

2007 Protest movement

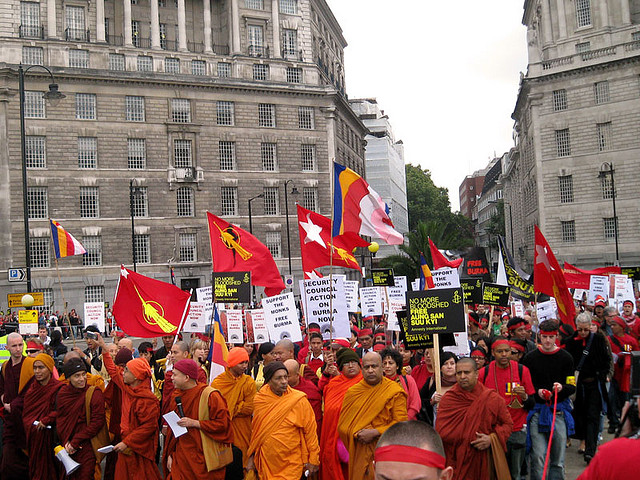
Protesters march in London organised by the Burma Campaign UK

Global Day of Action for Burma was an initiative by Burma Campaign UK and The Support The Monks Protest In Burma group on Facebook.com who called, during the 2007 Burmese anti-government protests, for October 6, 2007 to be designated a "Global Day of Action for Burma" beginning at 12:00 noon. This event was held in 30 countries and nearly 100 cities including: Sydney (Australia), Montreal, Ottawa and Vancouver (Canada), New York City and San Diego (United States), Hong Kong and Norway.

Spurred by the global outcry as a result of the military crackdown on the peaceful protesters all over Burma, a number of independent groups, social service organisations and individuals had gotten together to support the Burmese populace. The concept for the day was developed by a coalition of Burma groups including - Burma Campaign UK, US Campaign for Burma, Amnesty International, Avaaz.org and many, many more.

Much of the coordination for the protests was done through Facebook.com, where a group called Support the Monk's Protest in Burma (now called Burma Global Action Network was later formed), working closely with Burma Campaign UK and Amnesty International, had steadily grown to over 440,000 members in a matter of weeks. It was and a hotbed of protest related news and as a flashpoint for Burma related activity on the Internet.

An online petition hosted by Avaaz.org was being sent to the Chinese president Hu Jintao and the UN Security Council, urging them to "oppose a violent crackdown on the demonstrators" and "support genuine reconciliation and democracy". The petition includes a pledge to hold them "accountable for any further bloodshed". Initially it aimed to receive 500,000 signatures, having achieved that, a new target of 1,000,000 has been set. As of January 2008, it had 834,718.

International Bloggers' Day for Burma, a campaign for bloggers to not post to their blogs, was held on October 4. They were asked to simply put up one banner, underlined with the words, "Free Burma!".

Besides the larger and more public protests held in these major cities, numerous smaller organisations and groups of individuals participated in this event in places where a more formal demonstration was not possible either due to local government opposition or lack of adequate infrastructural support.

The protests were all peaceful in nature, aimed at more at promoting awareness about the plight of the Burmese people and to activate public support for their cause. Protesters used various means to show solidarity, with some wearing red and saffron clothing, sporting red Buddhist sacred threads, usage of the Peacock Flag and other iconography associated with the movement.

The events were considered a success and organizers hoped that public involvement would force international community to take appropriate action.
