= Padoh Mahn Sha Lah Phan =

Burmese politician (1943–2008)

- ဖဒိုမန်းရှာလာဖန်း

Secretary General of the Karen National Union
- Succeeded by: Naw Zipporah Sein

Personal details
- Born: 5 July 1943 Tawgyaung, Maubin District, Karen State, British Burma
- Died: 14 February 2008 (aged 64) Mae Sot, Thailand
- Cause of death: Assassination (gunshot wounds)
- Party: Karen National Union
- Spouse: Nang Kyin Shwe
- Children: Say Say Phan; Nant Bwa Bwa Phan; Zoya Phan; Slone Phan
- Education: Rangoon University

Padoh Mahn Sha Lah Phan (Burmese: ဖဒိုမန်းရှာလာဖန်း, Pwo Western Karen: ၦဒိၪမၩ့ၡၪလၩဖၩ့; 5 July 1943 – 14 February 2008) was the secretary general of the Karen National Union (KNU), an insurgent group in Myanmar.

== Early life ==
Mahn Sha Lah Phan was born and raised in Tawgyaung, Maubin District. He studied at the University of Yangon, receiving a degree in history. After graduating, he joined the Karen resistance in Burma, and it was then that, like many other members of the Karen resistance movement, he changed his name to Mahn Sha Lah Phan, which in Karen means "Mr. Star Moon Bright". He chose star and moon (Sha Lah) to represent the light of the future, and bright (Phan) in the belief that the future would be bright.

== Activism ==
The KNU, through its armed wing, the Karen National Liberation Army, has been fighting against the Burmese government for autonomy for the Karen people since 1949. It operates in both Burma and Thailand. He served as the Secretary-General of the KNU. Sha Lah Phan was against any form of surrender to the Burmese government.

== Personal life ==
Padoh Mahn Sha Lah Phan married a former KNU soldier, Nang Kyin Shwe, and had three children in addition to adopting a boy named Say Say. Despite frequently moving back and forth across the Burma-Thailand border, he insisted that his children receive the same education he did, and had adopted Say Say to give him a better education than what would have been available to him in his home village. His two daughters, Zoya Phan and Nant Bwa Bwa Phan, are both political activists in the United Kingdom, and Bwa Bwa is currently the United Kingdom representative of the Karen National Union.

In 2005, Phan allowed two Burmese children posing as refugees to stay in his house at Noh Poe. The children were really child soldiers who were sent to assassinate both him and Zoya; however, before they could carry out their plan, they admitted their real reason for coming to him. In return, he permitted them to stay at Noh Poe to prevent them from being forced back into the Burmese army.

== Death ==
On 14 February 2008 at about 4:30pm in the border town of Mae Sot, Thailand, Sha Lah Phan was sitting in the veranda of his home when two gunmen approached him bearing gifts, which were reportedly fruit baskets. One attacker shot Phan twice in the chest while the second gunman shot him as he lay on the ground. The attackers escaped in a pick-up truck. His house was approximately five kilometres from the Thai-Burmese border. He died instantly and was reportedly 64 years old at the time of his death.

Phan had predicted an increase in violence ahead of a Burmese constitutional referendum in May 2008, in an interview with Reuters the week of his death. His adopted son, Say Say Phan, blamed a Karen splinter group, the Democratic Karen Buddhist Army (DKBA), for carrying out the attack on behalf of the Burmese military rulers.
