= David Tharckabaw =

Phado Saw David Tharckabaw

Vice President of the Karen National Union
- Succeeded by: Naw Zipporah Sein

Personal details
- Born: 11 January 1935 (age 91) Karenni State, British Burma
- Party: Karen National Union
- Occupation: Politician

Phado Saw David Tharckabaw is Vice President and Minister of Foreign Affairs of the Karen National Union (KNU).

David Tharckabaw should not be confused with David Taw, who is the secretary of the KNU Peace Committee and also a member of a KNU delegation that negotiated peace with the Burmese government in January 2012.
