= Saffron Revolution =

Series of protests in Myanmar in 2007

- Part of the Myanmar conflict and Protests against democratic backsliding
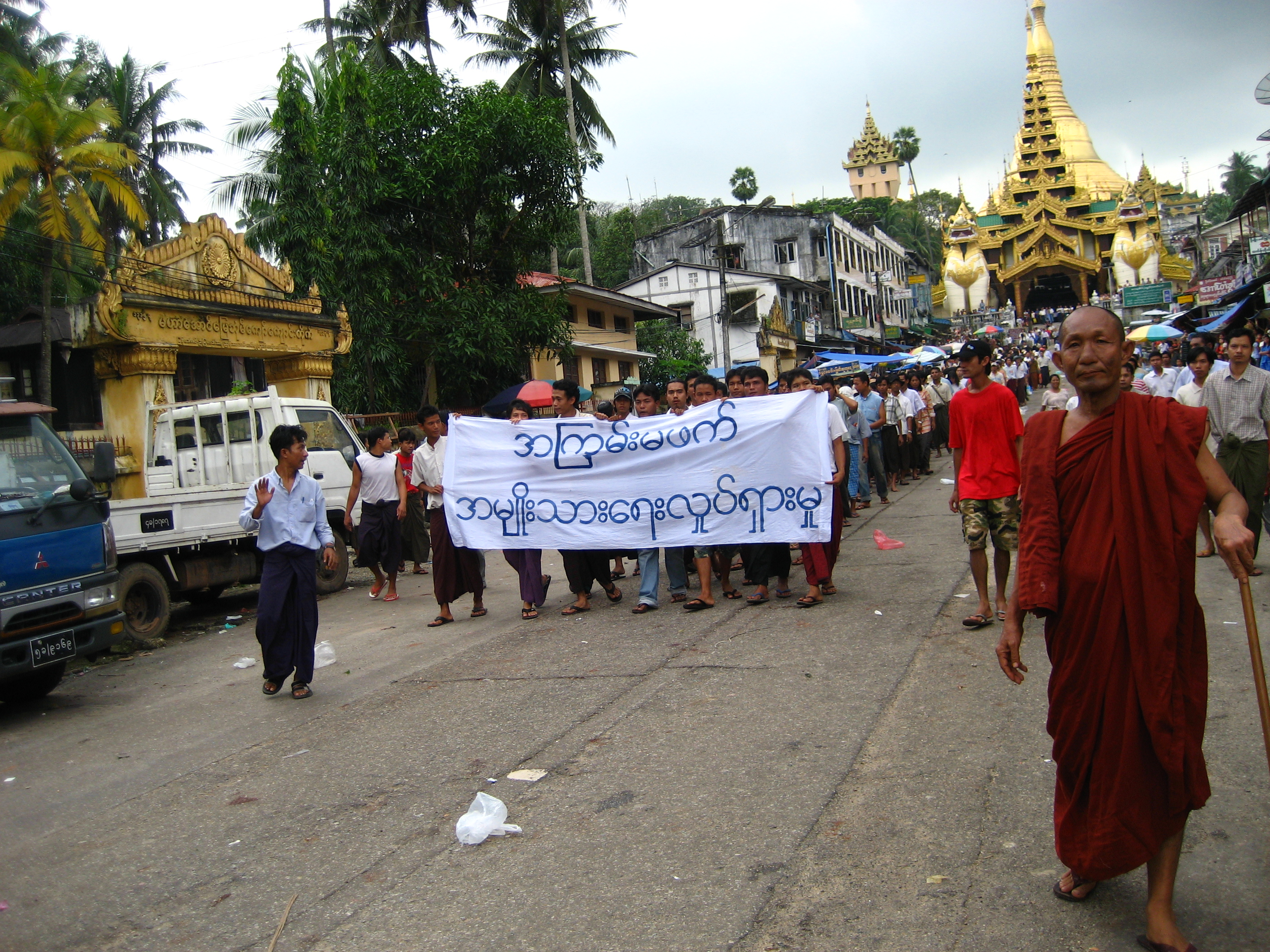
- Protesters in Yangon with a banner that reads "Non-violence: National Movement" in Burmese, in the background is Shwedagon Pagoda
- Date: 15 August 2007 – 26 September 2008
- Location: Myanmar
- Caused by: Stratocracy; Political repression; Political corruption; Human rights violations; Removal of fuel subsidies; State terrorism
- Goals: Federal democracy; Free elections; Human rights; Minority rights; Release of political prisoners; End of military involvement in politics
- Methods: Civil resistance, demonstrations, nonviolent resistance
- Result: Uprising suppressed, political reforms and election of a new government

Parties
Opposition: National League for Democracy; Student protestors; Theravada monks	State Peace and Development Council; Tatmadaw; Myanmar Police Force; Union Solidarity and Development Association; Supported by China (alleged)

The Saffron Revolution (Burmese: ရွှေဝါရောင်တော်လှန်ရေး, romanized: Shwaywarraung Tawlhaanrayy; [sw̥èi wà jàʊɰ̃ tɔ̀ l̥àɰ̃ jéi]) was a series of economic and political protests and demonstrations that took place during August, September and October 2007 in Myanmar. The protests were triggered by the decision of the national military government to remove subsidies on the sales prices of fuel. The national government is the only supplier of fuels and the removal of the price subsidy immediately caused diesel and petrol prices to increase by 66–100% and the price of compressed natural gas for buses to increase 500% in less than a week.

The various protests were led by students, political activists, including women, and Buddhist monks and took the form of a campaign of nonviolent resistance, sometimes also called civil resistance.

In response to the protests, dozens of protesters were arrested or detained. Starting in September 2007 the protests were led by thousands of Buddhist monks, and those protests were allowed to proceed until a renewed government crackdown in late September 2007. Some news reports referred to the protests as the Saffron Revolution.

The exact number of casualties from the 2007 protests is not known, but estimates range from 13 to 31 deaths resulting from either the protests or reprisals by the government. Several hundred people were arrested or detained, many (but not all) of whom were released. In the event, Senior General Than Shwe remained in power until he retired in 2011 at age 78.

== Terminology ==
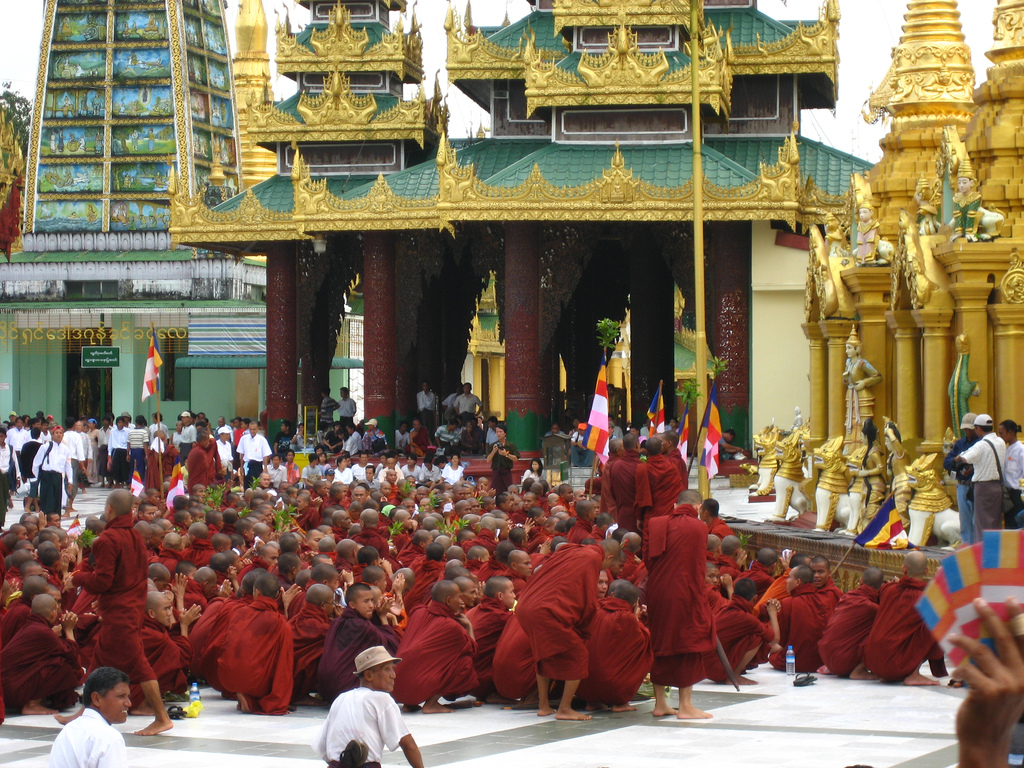
Protesting monks gathering at the Shwedagon Pagoda in Yangon

The phrase "Saffron Revolution" connects the protests against Myanmar's military dictatorship to the saffron-coloured robes widely associated with Buddhist monks, who were at the forefront of the demonstrations. The robes of Burmese monks are similar to the color of whole saffron. While similar terms for protests had been used elsewhere for the process of gradual or peaceful revolution in other nations (see colour revolution), this seems to be the first time it has been associated with a particular protest as it was unfolding, and the international press seized upon the term in reporting on the Burmese protests. However, the idea that the monkhood is connected to specifically Burmese ideas about revolution has been argued by British academic Gustaaf Houtman, partly in critique of an alternative view held by a political scientist, that Gen. Ne Win's 1962 revolution was the only successful revolution in Burma. Burmese concepts of "revolution", however, have a much longer history and are also employed in many but not all monastic ordinations.

The military government of Burma was called the State Peace and Development Council or the "SPDC" from 1988 to 2011.

== History ==
=== Background ===
Prior to the 2007 summer protests, there had been growing unease in the population regarding the economic situation due to stagnant economic growth and its ranking among the 20 poorest countries in the world according to the United Nations. Many, including the United Nations have blamed the economic problems on the leadership of the military junta and the proportion of national income spent on the armed forces. In late 2006, the cost of basic commodities began rising sharply in Burma, with rice, eggs, and cooking oil increasing by 30–40%. According to the UN, one in three children is chronically malnourished, government spending on health and education is among the lowest anywhere in the world, and the average income is below $300 a year. Living a privileged, parallel existence, Burma's military forces appear virtually a "state within a state", free from the economic insecurity that afflicts the rest of the country. Many of the high ranking army generals have become immensely rich, as witnessed in the video of the wedding of senior general Than Shwe's daughter, who is shown wearing diamonds worth many millions of dollars.

According to the BBC, on 22 February 2007, a small group of individuals protested the high consumer prices in the country. While the protest was small and careful not to be seen as directed at the military junta, officials jailed nine of the protesters. It was the first street protest seen in Rangoon for at least a decade. Jeff Kingston, in his article "Burma's Despair" stated that "Despair and fear are immobilizing a people who yearn for a better life and have fruitlessly risked much for a better government." This shows how afraid the Burmese were to take action in 2007. Kingston also stated that "The earlier brutal crackdown of 1988-when at least three thousand protesters were killed and thousands more imprisoned and tortured-has burned a place in the collective memory."

Some of the prominent or symbolic individuals who figured in these events included:

- Senior General Than Shwe, Commander in Chief of the Myanmar Armed forces
- Aung San Suu Kyi, Burmese opposition figure and Nobel Peace Prize winner in 1991,
- Kenji Nagai, Japanese photojournalist who was killed during the protests,
- Zarganar, Burmese comedian and protester
- U Gambira, a leader of the Buddhist monks in opposition.

=== April 2007 ===
The military junta detained eight people on Sunday, 22 April 2007, who took part in a rare demonstration in a Yangon suburb amid a growing military crackdown on protesters. A group of about ten protesters carrying placards and chanting slogans staged the protest Sunday morning in Yangon's Thingangyun township, calling for lower prices and improved health, education and better utility services. The protest ended peacefully after about 70 minutes, but plainclothes police took away eight demonstrators as some 100 onlookers watched. The protesters carried placards with slogans such as "Down with consumer prices". Some of those detained were the same protesters who took part in a downtown Yangon protest on 22 February 2007. That protest was one of the first such demonstrations in recent years to challenge the junta's economic mismanagement rather than its legal right to rule. The protesters detained in the February rally had said they were released after signing an acknowledgment of police orders that they should not hold any future public demonstrations without first obtaining official permission.

The military government stated its intention to crack down on these human rights activists, according to a 23 April 2007 report in the country's official press. The announcement, which comprised a full page of the official newspaper, followed calls by human rights advocacy groups, including London-based Amnesty International, for authorities to investigate recent violent attacks on rights activists in the country.

Two members of Human Rights Defenders and Promoters, Maung Maung Lay, 37, and Myint Naing, 40, were hospitalized with head injuries following attacks by more than 50 people while the two were working in Hinthada township, Irrawaddy Division in mid-April. On Sunday, 22 April 2007, eight people were arrested by plainclothes police, members of the pro-junta Union Solidarity and Development Association, and the Pyithu Swan Arr Shin (a paramilitary group) while demonstrating peacefully in a Yangon suburb. The eight protesters were calling for lower commodity prices, better health care and improved utility services. Htin Kyaw, 44, one of the eight who also took part in an earlier demonstration in late February in downtown Yangon, was beaten by a mob, according to sources at the scene of the protest.

Reports from opposition activists emerged saying that authorities have directed the police and other government proxy groups to deal harshly with any sign of unrest in Yangon. "This proves that there is no rule of law [in Burma]," the 88 Generation Students group said in a statement. [Mon 23 April 2007] "We seriously urge the authorities to prevent violence in the future and to guarantee the safety of every citizen."

=== August 2007 – Removal of fuel subsidies ===
On 15 August 2007, the government removed subsidies on fuel causing a rapid and unannounced increase in prices. The government, which has a monopoly on fuel sales, raised prices from about $1.40 to $2.80 a gallon, and boosted the price of natural gas by about 500%. This increase in fuel prices led to an increase in food prices. Soon afterwards, protesters took to the streets to protest the current conditions.

While the International Monetary Fund and World Bank had been recommending the lifting of subsidies for some time to allow for a free market to determine fuel prices, these organisations did not recommend removing all of the subsidies unannounced. The fuel is sold by Myanma Oil and Gas Enterprise, a state-owned fuel company.

=== August 2007 – Initial demonstrations ===
In response to the increase in fuel prices, citizens protested in demonstrations beginning on 19 August. In response to the protests, the government began arresting and beating demonstrators. The government arrested 13 prominent Burmese dissidents including Min Ko Naing, Ko Ko Gyi, Min Zeya, Ko Jimmy, Pyone Cho, Arnt Bwe Kyaw and Ko Mya Aye. The government newspaper New Light of Myanmar reported that these individual's actions caused civil unrest that "was aimed at undermining peace and security of the State and disrupting the ongoing National Convention." The United States condemned the arrest of these dissidents on 22 August, with the State Department's acting spokesman stating "The United States calls for the immediate release of these activists and for an end of the regime's blatant attempt to intimidate and silence those who are engaged in peaceful promotion of democracy and human rights in Burma...We call on the regime to engage in a meaningful dialogue with the leaders of Burma's democracy movement and ethnic minority groups and to make tangible steps toward a transition to civilian democratic rule."

On 21–22 August 2007, participants of the protests on 19 August were detained by local authorities. Their houses were searched without a warrant. These demonstrators could have been charged with up to one year in prison; under the 5/96 Law, which is used to condemn those who disrupt the stability of the state.

=== September 2007 – Escalation ===
On 5 September 2007, Burmese troops forcibly broke up a peaceful demonstration in Pakokku and injured three monks. It was further reported that one monk was killed. This report however was never confirmed but quoted as a reason for the monks' protests starting on September 18. The next day, younger monks in Pakokku briefly took several government officials hostage in retaliation. They demanded an apology by the deadline of 17 September but the military refused to apologise. This sparked protests involving increasing numbers of monks in conjunction with the withdrawal of religious services for the military. Their role in the protests was significant due to the reverence paid to them by the civilian population and the military. After these events, protests began spreading across Myanmar, including Yangon (also known as Rangoon), Sittwe, Pakokku and Mandalay.

On 22 September, around two thousand monks marched through Yangon and ten thousand through Mandalay, with other demonstrations in five townships across Myanmar. Those marching through the capital chanted the "Metta Sutta" (the Buddha's words on loving kindness) marching through a barricade on the street in front of Nobel Peace Prize laureate Aung San Suu Kyi. Although still under house arrest, Suu Kyi made a brief public appearance at the gate of her residence to accept the blessings of the Buddhist monks. In Mandalay, estimated to have 200 monasteries, monks were said to have told people not to join the protests, which ended peacefully.

As of 22 September 2007, the Buddhist monks were reported to have withdrawn spiritual services from all military personnel in a symbolic move that was seen as very powerful in such a deeply religious country as Burma. The military rulers seemed at a loss as to how to deal with the demonstrations by the monks as using violence against monks would incense and enrage the people of Burma even further, almost certainly prompting massive civil unrest and perhaps violence. However, the longer the junta allowed the protests to continue, the weaker the regime could look. The danger is that eventually the military government will be forced to act rashly and doing so will provoke the citizenry even more. Some international news agencies are referring to the uprising as a 'Saffron Revolution'.

On 23 September, 150 nuns joined the protests in Yangon. On that day, some 15,000 Buddhist monks and laymen marched through the streets of Yangon in the sixth day of escalating peaceful protests against the Burmese military regime. The Alliance of All Burmese Buddhist Monks vowed to continue the protests until the Burmese military junta is deposed.

==== 24 September 2007 ====
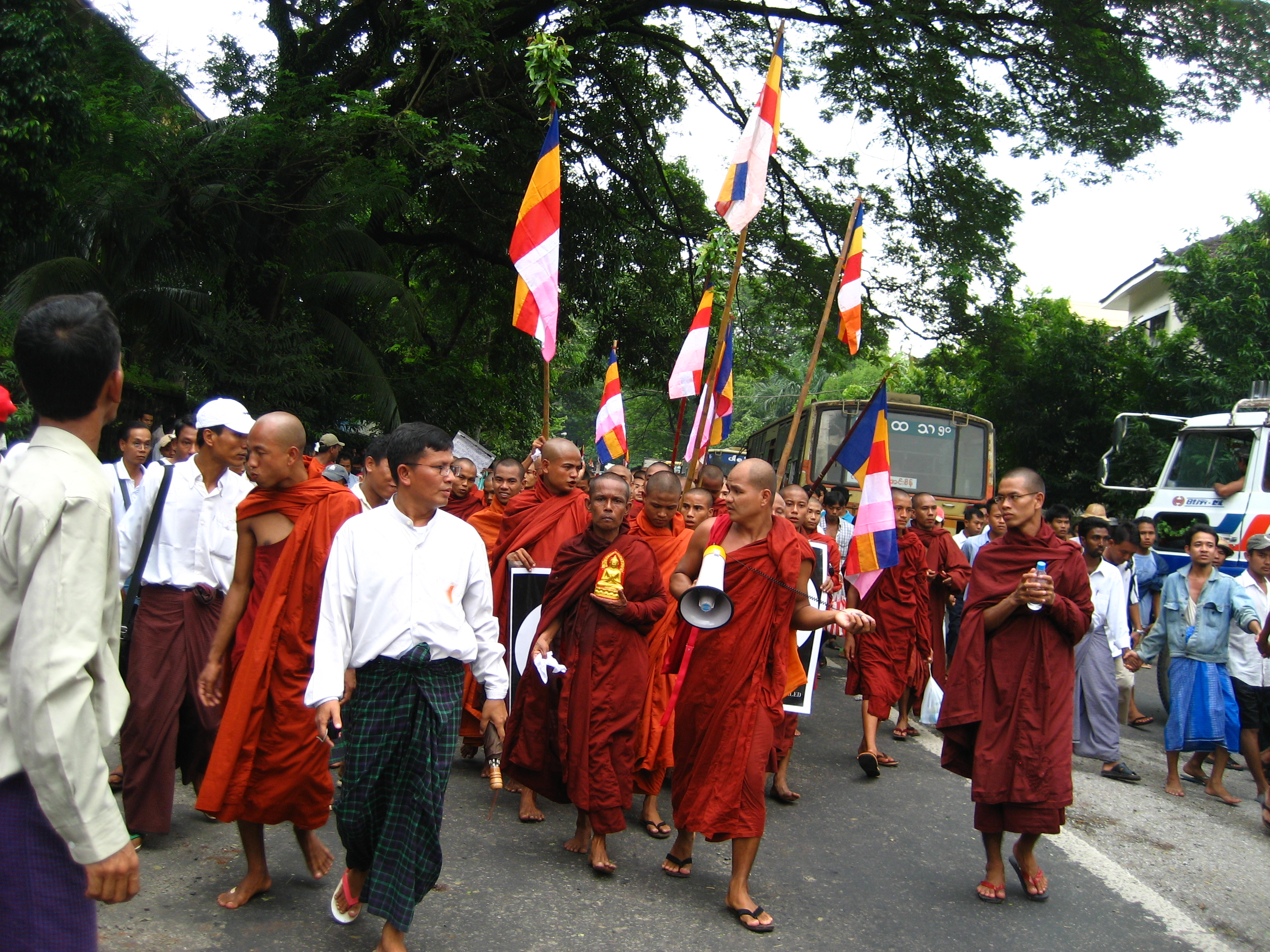
Monks protesting in Yangon, carrying the Buddhist flag

On 24 September, eyewitnesses reported between 30,000 and 100,000 people demonstrating in Yangon, making the event the largest Burmese anti-government protest in twenty years. The BBC reported that two locally well-known actors, comedian Zargana and film star Kyaw Thu, went to Yangon's golden Shwedagon Pagoda early on Monday to offer food and water to the monks before they started their march. The marches occurred simultaneously in at least 25 cities across Myanmar, with columns of monks stretching up to 1-kilometre (0.62 mi). At the end of the march, approximately 1,000 monks arrived to greet Aung San Suu Kyi's home but were denied access by police. They chanted prayers before peacefully moving off. Later that day, the military junta's Minister for Religion, Brigadier General Thura Myint Maung, warned the Buddhist monks leading the protests not to go beyond their "rules and regulations".

Meanwhile, President George W. Bush introduced unilateral sanctions against the Burmese leaders during his speech to the UN General Assembly and encouraged other countries to follow its lead. The Dalai Lama also gave his blessing to the monks in their bid for greater freedom and democracy.

==== 25 September 2007 ====
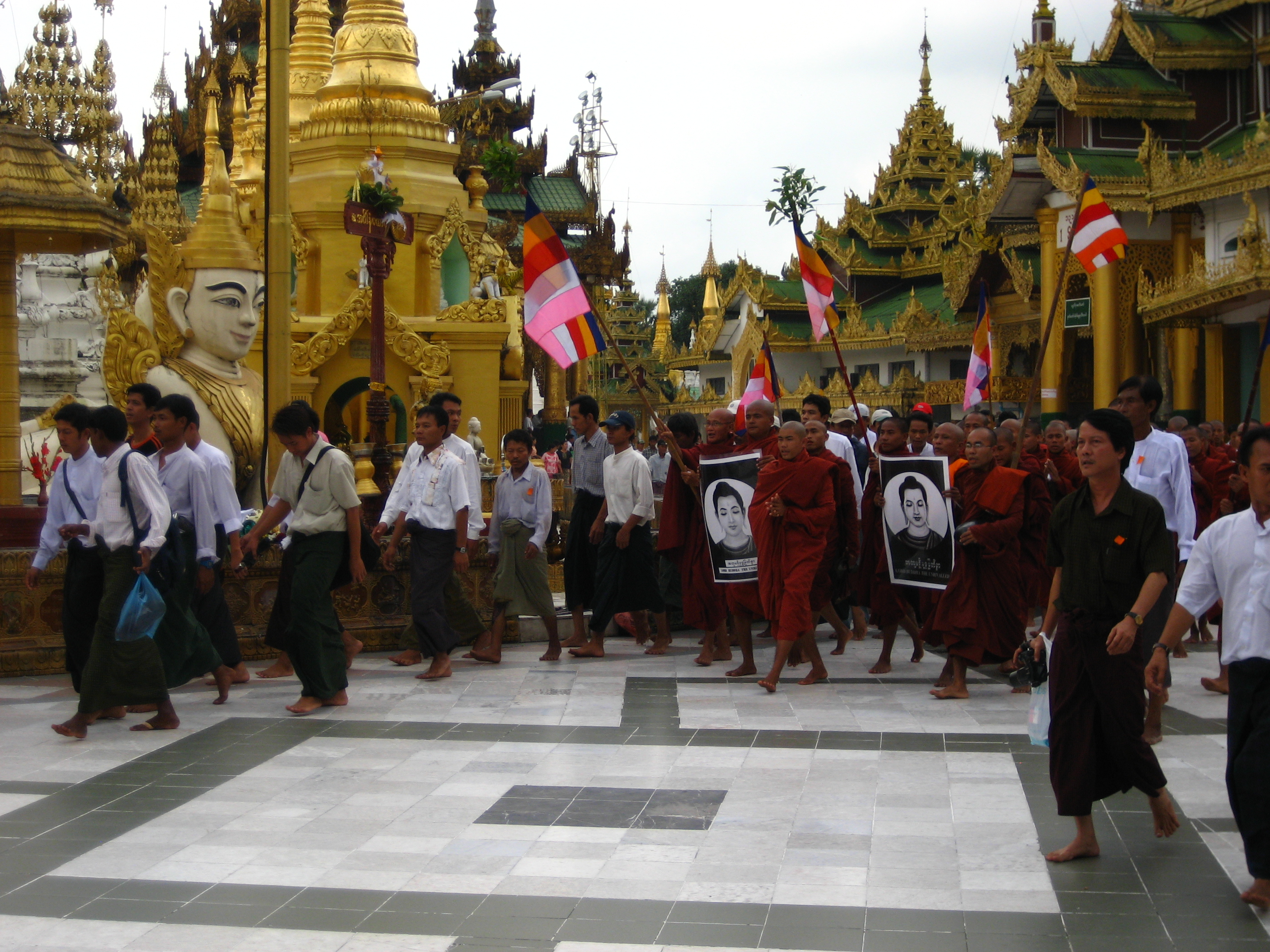
Protesters at Shwedagon Pagoda in Yangon

On 25 September, the junta threatened demonstrators with military force and placed army trucks at Shwedagon Pagoda, the assembly point for monks leading the protests. Witnesses said 5,000 monks and laypeople marched into the Shwedagon. Civilians were forming a human shield around the monks; Reuters quotes one eyewitness: "They are marching down the streets, with the monks in the middle and ordinary people either side – they are shielding them, forming a human chain.". Vehicles mounted with loudspeakers toured central Yangon, blaring warnings of military action. "People are not to follow, encourage or take part in these marches. Action will be taken against those who violate this order," the broadcasts said, invoking a law allowing the use of military force to break up illegal protests. Reuters reported that the detained democracy leader Aung San Suu Kyi had been moved to the Insein Prison on Sunday, a day after she appeared in front of her house to greet marching monks.

Effective 26 September, Myanmar's junta imposed dusk-till-dawn curfews on the country's two largest cities, Yangon and Mandalay. Additionally, gatherings of more than five people were prohibited. Meanwhile, truckloads of armed soldiers and riot police were sent into Yangon.

=== Junta crackdown ===
==== 26 September 2007 ====
On 26 September, pro-democracy figure Win Naing was arrested at his home in Yangon around 2:30 a.m. after being seen providing food and water to the protesting monks but was released from jail after one night, according to an anonymous friend and Western diplomat. He had been arrested on 8 March for holding a press conference with Burmese demonstrators against the national economic hardships. Prominent Burmese comedian Zargana was also arrested overnight. Troops barricaded the Shwedagon Pagoda and attacked a group of 700 protesters with batons and tear gas. The police, beating their shields with batons, chased some of the monks and some 200 supporters, while others tried to remain in place near the eastern gate of the pagoda complex. Troops then sealed off the area around the pagoda, attempting to prevent the monks from making further protests. This failed to stop the marches, with up to 5,000 monks progressing through Yangon, some wearing masks in anticipation of tear gas being used.

Later in the day there were reports of at least three Buddhist monks and one woman confirmed killed in the firing by security forces in Yangon when thousands of people led by Buddhist monks continued their protest against the military junta. A doctor in Yangon's general hospital confirmed that three injured monks had been admitted to the hospital after they were beaten up severely by the riot police at Shwedagon pagoda. The Swedish National Radio correspondent in Yangon reported that more than 300 people, many of whom were monks, were detained. He also reported a new sentiment in Yangon: "People come up to me quite spontaneously and voice their opinion in a way they never did before." ... "People feel great admiration for the brave monks". The Burma Campaign UK said its sources had reported the junta ordering large numbers of maroon monastic robes and telling soldiers to shave their heads, possibly to infiltrate the monks.

==== 27 September 2007 ====
On 27 September, the junta security forces began raiding monasteries across the country to quell the protests, arresting at least 200 monks in Yangon and 500 more in the northeast. Simultaneously, the army raided four other monasteries in parts of Yangon and arrested several monks. Sources confirmed that the army had raided the six-storied Religious Science Monastery in Chaukhtatgyi Pagoda, Moe Kaung Monastery in Yan Kin township, Maggin Monastery in Thingankyun township, and Thein Phyu monastery in Thein Phyu area and arrested several monks. An anonymous diplomat also said the junta claimed soldiers now had the monks "under control" and "would now turn their attention to civilian protesters".

Up to 50,000 protesters took to the streets in Yangon. Protesters bleeding from beatings by security forces were seen scattering and fleeing in Sule. Security forces were reported to be preparing to use insect spray to crack down on protesters. Eyewitnesses said fire engines and insect spray carrier trucks were seen near Theingyi market in downtown Yangon. The BBC received unconfirmed reports that fire crews were ordered to fill their machines with insecticide.

According to several news media, the armed forces gave the protesters 10 minutes to disperse or face extreme action. The radio station Democratic Voice of Burma reported that nine civilians, including Japanese photographer Kenji Nagai, had been shot and killed by the armed forces. Nagai was working for APF Tsushin, a media company based in Tokyo. The Japanese embassy in Myanmar later confirmed Nagai's death. Amateur video showing Nagai apparently being deliberately shot was aired on Japanese television. Later footage also showed a Burmese soldier taking Nagai's video camera.

Soldiers fired both into the air and directly at students marching toward a high school in Tamwe township in Yangon. Unconfirmed eyewitness reports say 100 people were shot. Up to 300 of the students outside were arrested after a military truck rammed into the crowd.

Some 50,000 protesters are reported to have demonstrated peacefully in Akyab while soldiers were stationed at seven key places, including government buildings, Lawkanada temple, and Akyi Tong Kong temple.

In the evening, the Burmese state television reported that nine people had been killed in a force crackdown on pro-democracy protesters in Yangon. It added that eleven demonstrators and 31 soldiers had been injured.

At the end of the day, it was reported that the junta had formed new regiments to crack down on protesters. According to sources close to the military, Senior General Than Shwe took direct command after several commanders refused to use force to crack down on protesters. The newspaper The Guardian published a report of a letter received by Burmese exiles in Thailand, allegedly written by disgruntled military officers, expressing support for the protests and stating, "On behalf of the armed forces, we declare our support for the non-violent action of the Buddhist monks and members of the public and their peaceful expression...". The letter also announced the formation of a group called the Public Patriot Army Association. The Guardian was unable to confirm the authenticity of the letter itself before the story was published.

There were unconfirmed reports that Than Shwe's family fled the country. A chartered Air Bagan flight carrying eight passengers landed in Vientiane, Laos, at 6 p.m. (local time). Air Bagan is owned by Than Shwe's ally Tay Za.

The United Nations' special envoy to Myanmar, Ibrahim Gambari, was allowed into the country after the Burmese authorities bowed to international pressure. He was sent to Myanmar after the Security Council convened in New York over the crisis to call for restraint.

==== 28 September 2007 ====
On 28 September, Yangon was emptier than the previous days, as people were afraid of violent reprisals from the army, though many still took to the streets chanting such phrases as "wrongdoers who kill monks" as well as "the military science given by general Aung San is not supposed to kill the people" (i.e. the military isn't supposed to kill the people). The President of the Philippines Gloria Macapagal Arroyo urged Myanmar to take steps toward democracy. The Philippine President warned Myanmar that the Philippines would stop its financial help to Myanmar if opposition leader Aung San Suu Kyi was not released. US envoys called on China to use its influence with Myanmar.

The Myanmar government attempted to dampen public awareness and communications around the protests by cutting Internet access. Troops specifically targeted those caught carrying cameras and beat them. On 28 September, after the killing of Japanese photographer Kenji Nagai by the junta, Japanese Prime Minister Yasuo Fukuda said he regretted the killing and demanded a full explanation of his death. The Association of Southeast Asian Nations was urged to join the push for a UN mission to Myanmar, while the United Nations Security Council urged restraint from the government.

There were reports that Burmese troops from central Myanmar had started to march towards Yangon. The troops were from the Central Command based in Taungoo and the South East Command. It was not clear if the troops were marching to reinforce or to challenge the troops in Yangon for shooting the Buddhist monks.

Vice Senior-General Maung Aye, Than Shwe's second-in-command and the commander in chief of the army, "reportedly disagreed with the violent approach taken against protesters", and was scheduled to meet with Aung San Suu Kyi, who was reportedly taken to Yemon Military Camp on the outskirts of Yangon. Another report claimed Maung Aye had staged a coup against Than Shwe, that his troops were guarding Aung San Suu Kyi's home, and that diplomatic sources said that Aung San Suu Kyi had been moved to a police academy compound outside Yangon; although no independent confirmation has been made on the report.

Helfen ohne Grenzen (Help without Frontiers) reported that soldiers from the 66th LID (Light Infantry Division) had turned their weapons against other government troops and possibly police in North Okkalappa township in Yangon and were defending the protesters. While soldiers from 33rd LID in Mandalay were also reported to have refused orders to take actions against protesters, other reports state many soldiers remained in their barracks. Later reports stated that soldiers from the 99th LID were being sent in to confront them.

==== 29 September 2007 ====
A report warned that the military would attempt to trick UN envoys by asking their followers to carry out a set-up protest – protesting against the genuine demonstrations, with SPDC followers forcing civilians to join in. The same source stated that attendance of one person per family in some parts of the town was being demanded. In view of the Internet blackout, a group of "88-generation activists" urged the United Nations, along with the United States and United Kingdom embassies in Yangon, to open a one-page Web service via Wi-Fi access to the general public just to submit news photos. The blog site confirmed from different sources that soldiers and police were officially ordered not to shoot at the crowd.

It was also reported that the UN envoys would meet Lieutenant Senior General Maung Aye, the second chief of the junta. The BBC reported that several hundred people had gathered in Yangon and that eyewitness reports said demonstrators were surrounded by security forces and pro-military vigilante groups. United Nations Special Envoy Ibrahim Gambari arrived in Yangon and was due to fly immediately to Naypyidaw to talk with the junta generals. Eyewitnesses told the BBC that over 1,000 people were demonstrating against the government. There were fresh reports of new violence; the French news agency AFP stated that security forces charged a group of around 100 protesters on the Pansoedan bridge in central Yangon.

Approximately 5,000 people gathered to demonstrate in Mandalay. The military was reported to have put most monasteries under guard to prevent egress. People gathered at 80th, 84th, 35th, and 33rd Streets, before joining together; three military trucks followed them and tried to break up the demonstrators, arresting one student who attempted to cross the road in front of them. The military forced monks from outside Mandalay to return to their native towns, the military keeping the homes of NLD Party leaders under guard. Peaceful demonstrations were reported in Mandalay. The Ngwe Kyar Yan Monastery in South Okkalarpa which was subject to a raid some days earlier was under repair, some suggested, in an effort to eliminate evidence. A dedicated group of anti-riot troops was reported to have been formed within Brigate-77 led by Col. Thein Han under Minister Aung Thaung and General Htay Oo's supervision. Agricultural Minister General Maung Oo and Minister of Information Brig. General Kyaw Hsan was said to be in charge of arresting monks at night.

Only an hour after his scheduled arrival at Yangon, it was reported that Ibrahim Gambari, the UN Secretary-General's special adviser on Myanmar, had arrived in Naypyidaw to talk with the junta leaders. White House National Security Council Spokesman Gordon Johndroe stated "We have concerns that Mr. Gambari was swiftly moved from Rangoon (Yangon) to the new capital in the interior, far from population centres" and urged the junta to allow Gambari wide access to people, religious leaders and Aung San Suu Kyi. When asked if he expected to meet Suu Kyi, Gambari said: "I expect to meet all the people that I need to meet."

An early report indicated that the junta denied Gambari a meeting with Aung San Suu Kyi. In addition, the army, late at night, set up a machine-gun nest outside her house.

An audio message from inside Myanmar said that crying crematorium workers claimed that they were forced by soldiers to burn injured protesters and civilians to death in YaeWay crematorium on the outskirts of Yangon. The Times Online later reported that it was "widely accepted that the cremations began on the night of Friday, 28 September", but the reports of people being burned alive were being "treated with extreme caution by independent observers and have not been verified". In Yangon, soldiers rerouted the Sule bus stop to Thamada Cinema in an effort to keep people away from Sule Pagoda. Some bus drivers were not informed of this change, and passengers getting off at the old stop were beaten upon dismounting. In Mandalay, non-monk prisoners were taken to a field and a barber was asked to shave their heads so that they could be dressed as monks and forced to create confusion and mistrust of real monks.

Monks and civilians were reported to have called diplomats to state that troops had arrived at three monasteries but had been prevented from entering by local residents who had massed outside. Making threats of returning in larger numbers, the soldiers then departed.

Mizzima news reported that in Mandalay, the NLD divisional organising committee member Win Mya Mya was arrested by police sub-Inspector Tun Lwin Naung at 11 p.m. last night at her home. "She seemed to know in advance of her imminent arrest. She is prepared and took her clothes with her," her sister Tin Win Yee, told reporters, "I am worried about her. This month is the period of Ramadan and she is being treated for her injury sustained in the Depayin incident".

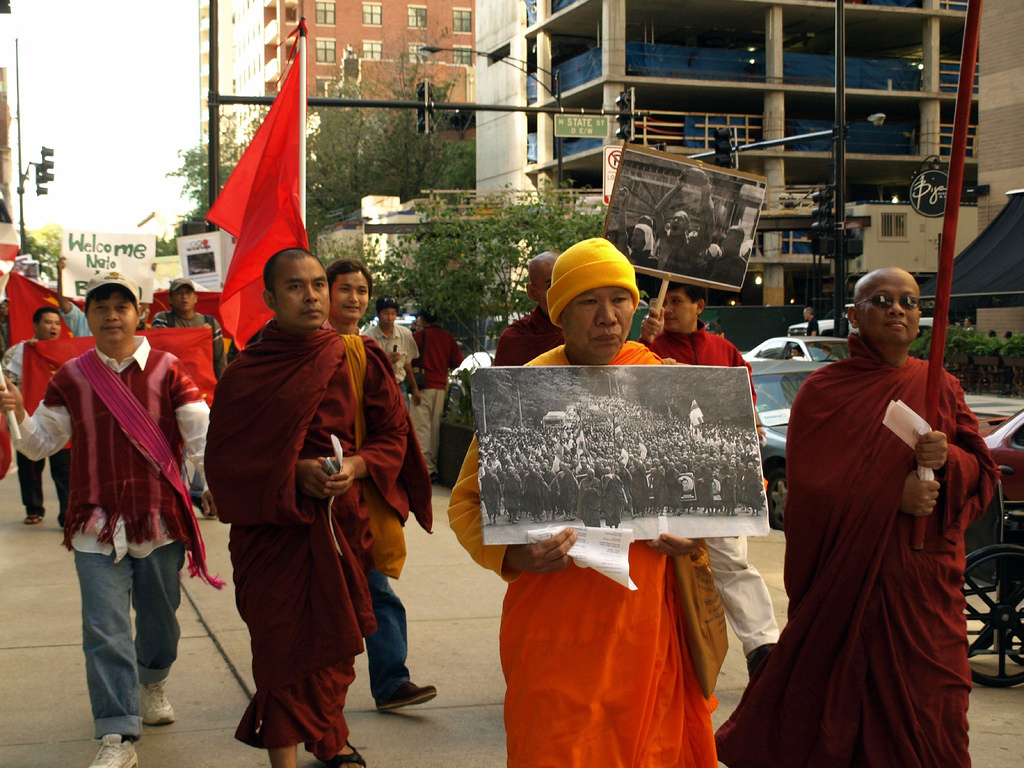
A Burmese protest march in Chicago

Citizens in Myitkyina and other townships in northern Myanmar were coerced into joining pro-government rallies designed to manufacture a show of support for a national convention, though most of the speeches were simply condemnations from junta leaders of the uprisings. Two people from each household were required to attend. "We were warned that we would be punished if we didn't come to the rally. So we attended it because we were afraid," said one resident.

Ngwe Kyar Yan Monastery in Rangoon, where some 200 monks were detained in the early morning two days earlier, was reported to have been looted by soldiers. Everything of value was said to have been removed, including forty or more Buddha statues and the head of one of the largest Buddhas which contains valuable jewels.

The largest demonstration in the country at Kyaukpadaung, Mandalay Division, numbered about 30,000 and was led by around 1,000 monks. The demonstrators marched peacefully despite heavy presence by security forces and military troops.

Some 10,000 farmers in Wra Ma, 30 miles north of Taungup, southern Rakhine State, were reported to have joined hands to protest against the government. The demonstrators were said to have been angry at the government's action against monks in Yangon. The report stated that the authorities in Taungup sent a platoon of police to the village soon after they received the information about the demonstration.

==== 30 September 2007 ====
Contrary to earlier reports, UN envoy Ibrahim Gambari was allowed to meet with Aung San Suu Kyi. The two spoke for ninety minutes at the State guest house in Yangon after Gambari returned from talks with the junta in Naypyidaw. Gambari met with acting Prime Minister Thein Sein, Culture Minister Khin Aung Myint and Information Minister Kyaw Hsan, but was not given an audience with senior general Than Shwe.

The Premier of the People's Republic of China, Wen Jiabao, announced: "China hopes all parties concerned in Myanmar show restraint, resume stability through peaceful means as soon as possible, promote domestic reconciliation and achieve democracy and development". Javier Solana, the European Union's foreign policy chief, urged China to lean harder on Myanmar. Mark Canning, the United Kingdom's ambassador in Myanmar, told the BBC of the deep underlying political and economic reasons for the demonstrations, which he said would not go away easily; "The cork has been put in the bottle, but the pressures are still there."

Colonel Hla Win, a central member of the military junta, was reportedly seeking political asylum in Norway. The colonel was said to be in hiding in the jungle with rebels of the Karen people. The colonel defected after being ordered to raid two monasteries and detain hundreds of monks. According to the colonel, these monks were to be killed and dumped in the jungle.

An eyewitness in Yangon says a monastery on Wei-za-yan-tar Road was raided early in the morning. Monks studying inside were ordered out, and one by one had their heads bashed against the brick wall of the monastery. Their robes were torn off and they were thrown into trucks and driven away. The head monk is confirmed to have died later that day. Only 10 of 200 remained afterwards, hiding inside, and the ground was covered with blood. Many civilians who had gathered to help were held back by the military with bayonets.

The Japanese Deputy Foreign Minister Mitoji Yabunaka, in Myanmar because of the death of Kenji Nagai, arrived in Naypyidaw to speak to government leaders.

==== 1 October 2007 ====
The barricades around the Shwedagon Pagoda were removed, witnesses told Reuters, but soldiers were still stationed at the four entrances. Monks said that at least five of their number had been killed during the clashes with security forces. Eyewitnesses said that troops and police were still positioned at many street corners and key locations around Yangon, making it impossible for demonstrators to gather.

Mark Canning, the British ambassador to Myanmar, said that China was pushing hard for Gambari's mission to be as long and as far-reaching as possible.

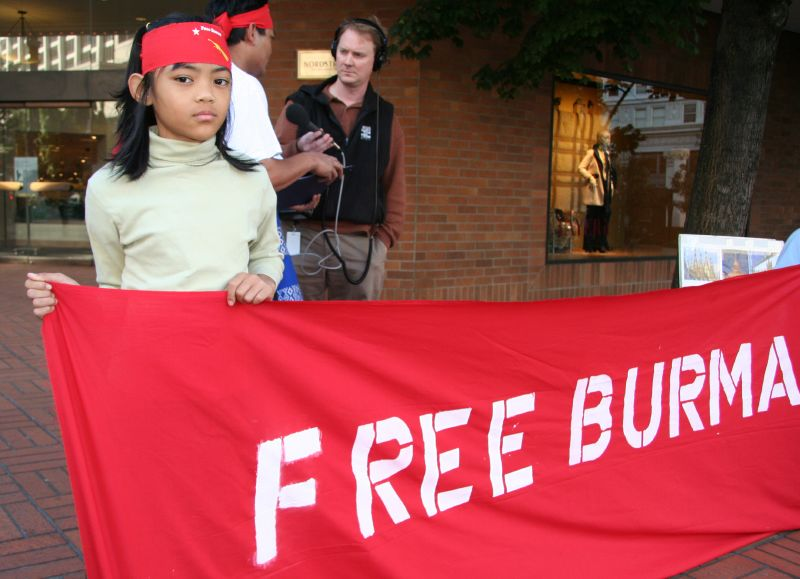
A "Free Burma" banner in Portland, Oregon.

Thousands of heavily armed soldiers were reported to be patrolling the streets of Yangon, and there were no signs of protests against the junta. The troops were stopping pedestrians and car drivers and searching them for cameras. The internet and mobile phone networks were still largely disrupted.

Around 4,000 monks were said to have been rounded up by the military during the previous week in an attempt to stamp out the protests. They were being held at a disused race course. A BBC report said that sources from a government-sponsored militia stated they would soon be moved away from Yangon, and that the monks have been disrobed and shackled. The Democratic Voice of Burma, the banned opposition broadcaster, published a photograph which they said showed the body of a monk floating near the mouth of the Yangon river.

5,000 protesters were reported to have gathered in the town of Man Aung, Rakhine State, in the morning. They marched while holding two banners displaying their demands; for the release of all political prisoners, a reduction in commodity prices, and national reconciliation.

Three people were arrested at a protest in Sanchaung Township in Yangon a report in The Irrawaddy stated.

==== 2 October 2007 ====
Ibrahim Gambari met with Aung San Suu Kyi for a second time, just hours after returning from talks with Than Shwe in Naypyidaw, where he conveyed concerns over the violent crackdown.

A report about imprisoned monks in Myanmar stated they were refusing to touch food given them by the military, and by doing so symbolically maintain their boycott of the regime.

Myanmar prime minister General Soe Win, reportedly died of leukaemia in Rangoon Defense Hospital, Mingladon, Yangon. But other sources claimed the rumours were false.

The United Nations Human Rights Council met and discussed the situation in Myanmar during a special session, and passed a resolution deploring the violent repression of peaceful demonstrations, and urging the release of all those arrested during the demonstrations.

==== 3 October 2007 ====
A BBC report stated that Gambari was in Singapore for a meeting with Prime Minister Lee Hsien Loong, but had not spoken with journalists. He was to prepare a report on his talks with Burma's leaders and brief the UN Security Council later in the week.

Reports from Yangon stated that some 25 monks were arrested by security forces in a raid on a temple overnight. As a result of the military crackdown on anti-government protests, "scores of monks" were said to be trying to leave Yangon, although some bus drivers refused to carry them as passengers, fearing they would not be allowed petrol. Military vehicles fitted with loudspeakers patrolled Rangoon's streets blaring: "We have photographs. We are going to make arrests." Some 80 monks and 149 women thought to be nuns, who had been detained during part of the military's crackdown on protesters, were freed, Reuters reported.

Riot police and soldiers were reported to be scouring Yangon with photographs to identify and arrest participants in last week's protests.

A report about nightly actions against demonstrators quoted one resident who said: "The repression is continuing every night. When there are no more witnesses, they drive through the suburbs at night and kill the people." The report stated that there is hunger and misery, many of the monks who demonstrated last week came from Okalapa Township and after suppressing Yangon centre on 29 September troops turned their attention to that township the following day.

==== 4 October 2007 ====
The body of the Japanese journalist, Kenji Nagai, was returned to Japan. An autopsy would be carried out; Japanese officials said that he was not shot accidentally as Burmese authorities have said, but was shot at close range. APF News, who employed Nagai, demanded that the camera he held when he was killed be returned; to that date only his second camera, thought to be a back-up, had been returned. Toru Yamaji, the head of APF News, said: "Our biggest task now is to confirm and report on what's in his camera and what he wanted to tell the people on his last day".

Another report stated that up to 10,000 people, many of them monks who led the protests, had been "rounded up for interrogation in recent days". United States diplomats who visited 15 monasteries found them empty, while others were being barricaded and guarded by soldiers, the report said.

==== 5 October 2007 ====
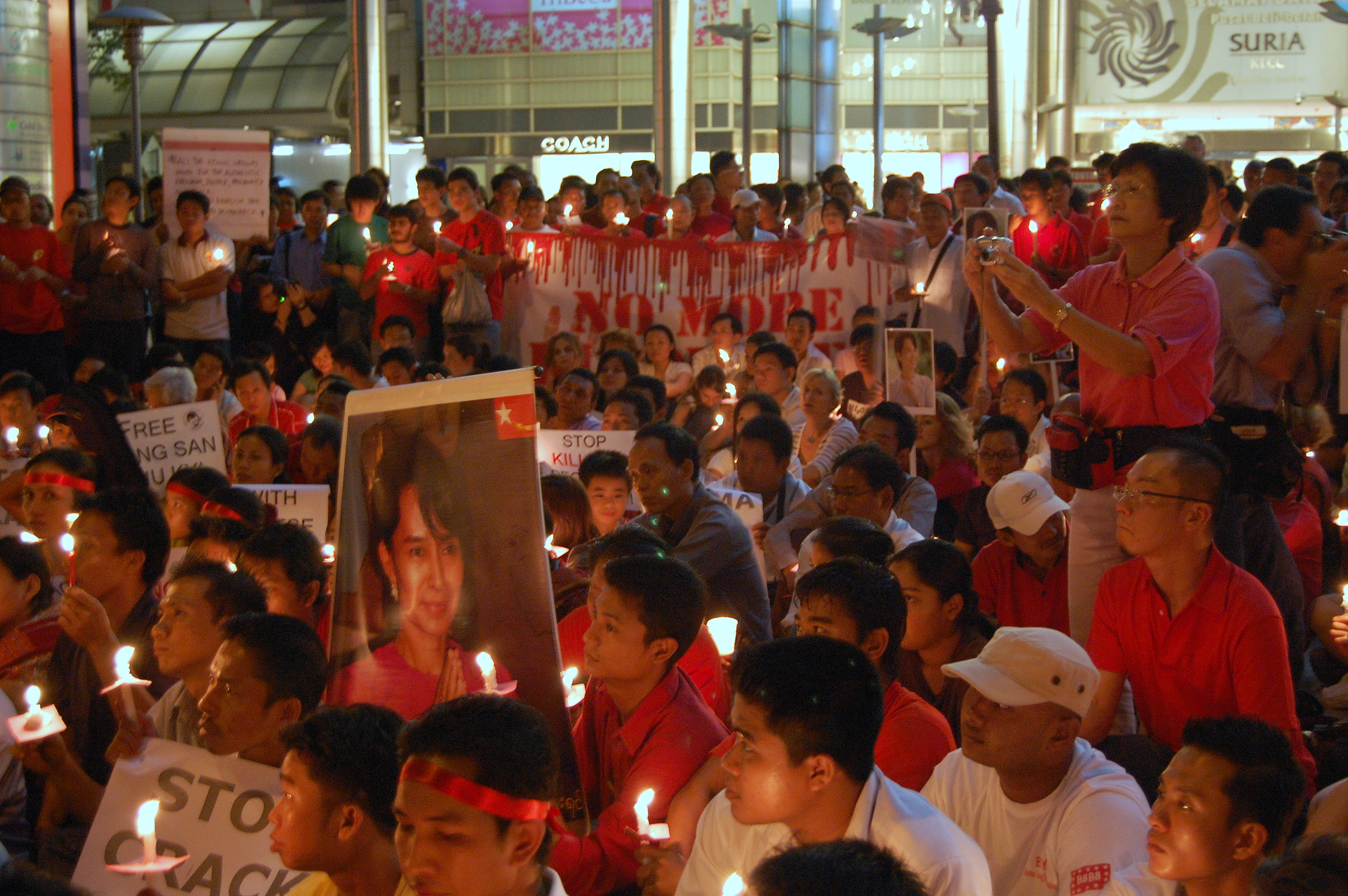
Protesters against the junta crackdown in Myanmar, in Kuala Lumpur, Malaysia on 5 October.

The opposition rejected the junta's conditional offer of talks with Aung San Suu Kyi. Shari Villarosa, the United States top diplomat in Myanmar, was invited to talk with the military leaders. The envoy was to 'clearly convey Washington's condemnation of last week's bloody repression' a US spokesperson said. The invitation followed a state television broadcast stating that nearly 2,100 people had been arrested over the last week and some 700 had been freed.

Reuters reported that protesters who applauded the demonstrations could face two to five years in jail, while the leaders could face 20 years. The Democratic Voice of Burma forwarded reports of some 50 students who demonstrated in Mandalay who had been sentenced to five years hard labour.

Some 60 troops from a battalion based in Akyab were reported to have been sent to the town of Man Aung, on Man Aung Island, to deal with demonstrations that continued for three days, ending on 2 October.

After meeting with many of the parties involved Ibrahim Gambari returned to New York and briefed the Security Council about his visit. The ambassador from Myanmar said of his country that had it had "indeed experienced a daunting challenge. However, we have been able to restore stability. The situation has now returned to normalcy. Currently, people all over the country are holding peaceful rallies within the bounds of the law to welcome the successful conclusion of the national convention, which has laid down the fundamental principles for a new constitution, and to demonstrate their aversion to recent provocative demonstrations."

==== 8 October 2007 ====
Yangon residents were reported to be "keeping up a low-key resistance", harassing troops by tossing rocks at them. In response, security forces detained some of the rock throwers. The retired General, U Aung Kyi, currently serving as Deputy Minister of Labor, was appointed as an official go-between for talks between Aung San Suu Kyi and the military junta on 8 October 2007.

==== 9 October 2007 ====
Ye Min Tun, a foreign ministry official for ten years, told the BBC how "appalling" treatment of Buddhist monks during the previous month's protests had forced him to resign from the military regime. Asked whether he thought the pro-democracy movement was now finished, the diplomat said: "I think it's not the end. I think it's just the beginning of the revolution."

South African president Nelson Mandela withdrew an invitation to Gary Player to host a fundraising golf tournament because of the former British Open champion's business links with Burma.

==== 10 October 2007 ====
There were reports that a Win Shwe, a member of the National League for Democracy, died during interrogation in the central Myanmar region of Sagaing. He and five colleagues had been arrested on 26 September. White House foreign affairs spokesman Gordon Johndroe said "The United States strongly condemns the atrocities committed by the junta and calls for a full investigation into the death of Win Shwe during his detention in Burma. The junta must stop the brutal treatment of its people and peacefully transition to democracy or face new sanctions from the United States." Witnesses claim that security forces were raiding houses in search of anyone whom they suspected of having been involved in the protests. The body of Win Shwe was not released, Thailand-based Assistance Association for Political Prisoners (AAPP) said. "His body was not sent to his family and the interrogators indicated that they had cremated it instead." Fears were expressed for others still held in police custody.

Sources claimed that five military generals and more than 400 soldiers of Sikai Division near Mandalay had been jailed for refusing to shoot and beat monks and civilians during the protests. Many civil servants were also staying away from work to show their disapproval of the junta's action. Rolls-Royce also made an official statement that it was ceasing all business dealings with the junta. It said it would cease aircraft engine repair work and terminate a contract involving the lease of an aircraft to a Burmese airline. A spokesman said "At that point, Rolls-Royce will have no further involvement in Burma."

==== 11 October 2007 ====
The Security Council met and issued a statement and reaffirmed its "strong and unwavering support for the Secretary-General's good offices mission", especially the work by Ibrahim Gambari. It also "strongly deplored the use of violence against peaceful demonstrations in Myanmar", welcomed the Human Rights Council of 2 October 2007, and emphasised the importance of the "early release of all political prisoners and remaining detainees", as well as urging the junta to prepare for a "genuine dialogue" with democratically elected leader Aung San Suu Kyi. Although a statement does not have the power of a resolution, it requires the consent of all its members and has been seen as a shift in position of China. Official media in Burma called the UN statement "regrettable," and stated that more than half of those arrested during the protests have since been released.

==== 12 October 2007 ====
Military rulers arrested what was thought to be the last four known leaders, part of the "88 Students Generation" activists of the 1988 pro-democracy uprising. Those detained included prominent woman activist Thin Thin Aye (also known as Mie Mie), Aung Htoo and Htay Kywe. Amnesty International issued a statement expressing grave concern for their safety and for others still being held.

Thousands attended a "pro-government" rally in Rangoon organised by the junta, many allegedly under coercion. Burmese dissident groups claimed that the numbers who attended the rally was much smaller than the government's figures. They also claimed that people were bussed to the rallies by the junta. AFP news agency also reported that every factory in the city's industrial zone had each been obliged to send 50 participants to the rally.

==== 13 October 2007 ====
Amnesty International issued a revised statement saying that six dissidents had been arrested in Yangon over the weekend. They said: "Continued arrests fly in the face of the promises made this week by the Myanmar authorities to cooperate with the United Nations."

==== 15 October 2007 ====
Gambari arrived in Thailand and issued a statement describing the latest arrests in Yangon as "extremely disturbing" [and] "counter to the spirit of mutual engagement" between the UN and Burma. The UN hoped that his meeting with military officials in Burma scheduled in mid November could be brought forward. Meanwhile, United Kingdom PM Gordon Brown urged the EU to propose tougher sanctions on Burma ahead of an EU meeting in Luxembourg at which the banning of imports of gemstones, timber and metals was already proposed for discussion.

The EU announced an agreement for further sanctions against the military junta but some have conceded that its leverage with Burma is limited and sanctions have so far controversially steered clear of its energy sector of which French oil giant Total is a major investor.

==== 16 October 2007 ====
Japan has cancelled funding of more than $4.7 m for a human resources centre based in Rangoon University. Chief Cabinet Secretary Nobutaka Machimura said that the decision was made in response to the military action in Burma. A White House spokesman said that the US was considering toughening its own existing sanctions. Meanwhile, ASEAN said it will not consider suspending Myanmar as a member, and rejected any proposal for economic sanctions. (As of 2004 Myanmar chaired a great number of Asean-sub-summits.) On 16 October 2007 Burma said it had arrested approximately 100 monks in the protests and that only 10 people had died, but widespread opinion held the real figures to be higher.

==== 17 October 2007 ====
Three high-profile demonstrators were released by the Burmese government; Zargana, a prominent comedian, along with actor Kyaw Thu, and his wife. In a published statement the junta stated: "Those who led, got involved in and supported the unrest which broke out in September are being interrogated" and "Some are still being called in for questioning and those who should be released will be." Officials claimed that a total of 2,927 people had been detained and nearly 500 were still being held, an increase of almost 800 since the previous official figures released on 8 October. Those released had been asked to sign a "pledge" first.

Reports in the Democratic Voice of Burma claimed that the NLD party chairman U Kyaw Khine, and secretary Ko Min Aung, have both been sentenced to seven and a half years imprisonment. U Htun Kyi and U Than Pe, two members of the NLD organising committee in Sandoway township, were sentenced to four and half years, while another party member from Gwa township, U Sein Kyaw, is standing trial. A total of around 280 party members were arrested, including 50 members in Kyaukse township in Mandalay Division, while others are reportedly on the run. Whilst reporting the same news, The Irrawaddy added a report about U Indriya, a monk from Sait-Ta-Thuka monastery, who is said to be one of the leaders of a peaceful demonstration in Sittwe. As a result, he has been sentenced to seven and a half years imprisonment.

==== 18 October 2007 ====
Two former schoolteachers, Tin Maung Oo and Ni Ni Mai, appeared in court after they spoke out against a pro-government rally in Paung Tal township, Bago division. On 16 October at about 5 am, a pro-government group were marching past the teachers house, shouting slogans denouncing the monk-led demonstrations and supporting the National Convention. The protestors stopped at seeing a sign hung outside by Maung Oo, which denounced those who tortured and killed monks and civilians. Ni Ni Mai stood in the doorway and asked the protestors if 'they really agreed with the killing of monks and civilians in Rangoon' at which the protestors stopped chanting slogans and some of them dropped their placards. A leader of the government protest is reported to have taken photographs of the couple and their house; later that day the township police chief and two female police officers came to arrest them. The couple are due to appear in court for sentencing on 30 October.

==== 19 October 2007 ====
President Bush has announced further sanctions against the Burmese military. He has tightened export controls and frozen more financial assets held by the junta and urged China and India to apply more pressure. In a White House statement he said: "Monks have been beaten and killed. Thousands of pro-democracy protesters have been arrested". "Burma's rulers continue to defy the world's just demand to stop their vicious persecution". "We are confident that the day is coming when freedom's tide will reach the shores of Burma."

A senior British diplomat told the BBC that some 2,500 people are still being held by the military. British officials also received first-hand accounts of grim conditions under which many detainees are still being held. Night raids are said to be continuing with hundreds being arrested.

==== 20 October 2007 ====
Burma's military announced the lifting of a curfew in two main cities, Mandalay and Yangon. The statement is being widely seen as a sign that the government is confident that it has now gained control of the recent dissent. However it is unclear whether the recent government ban on assemblies of more than five people had also been lifted.

==== 22 October 2007 ====
It has been announced that the United Nations special rapporteur for Human Rights in Burma, Paulo Sérgio Pinheiro, is to be allowed to visit Burma. Burmese Foreign Minister Nyan Win wrote to the UN stating that Pinheiro could arrive before mid-November. This will be the first visit by Pinheiro in four years; previously the military junta has refused to give their permission. Pinheiro welcomed news of his invitation, telling Reuters news agency that it was "an important sign that the government wants to engage again in constructive dialogue with the UN and the Human Rights Council". The BBC's Laura Trevelyan reports from the UN that the timing of the invitation is significant, a summit of the Association of South-East Asian Nations (Asean) is due to open on 17 November. The regime may believe that the move could reduce further criticism from members of Asean.

==== 24 October 2007 ====
Rights groups report that hundreds of ethnic minority tribespeople are fleeing Burma into the border state of Mizoram, India to escape the military regime. They claim that they are being forced to join pro-government rallies, in some cases at gunpoint, and if they refuse they face fines of up to 10,000 kyats ($7), while others have been arrested including Christian pastors. Many of the exodus are from the Christian minority ethnic Chin people who say they have been persecuted by the junta for being Christians and non-ethnic Burmese. Although they were initially welcomed in Mizoram after the 1988 military crackdown they now face threats of a pushback, as the Mizos (who are ethnic cousins of Chins) are now strongly opposing "unrestricted migration from the Chin State" for fear that they may one day be outnumbered by them.

Meanwhile, India has been accused of allowing its strategic and business interests to prevail in Burma, and for failing to put pressure on the generals.

==== 26 October 2007 ====
Hundreds of riot police and government troops armed with rifles and teargas launchers are said to be back on the streets of Rangoon (Yangon). They have surrounded the Shwedagon and Sule Pagodas, the two main focal points of peaceful demonstrations led by Buddhist monks in September. There are also said to be large coils of barbed wire present, in readiness to block streets. The troop presence coincides with the end of Buddhist Lent, and is thought to be aimed at preventing new protests, though according to Reuters there are no new protest developments. It also comes a day after detained pro-democracy leader Aung San Suu Kyi met with a military officer for talks. State Councilor for China Tang Jiaxuan told Gambari of the UN, who is expected to return to Burma in early November that words were the way forward. "The Myanmar issue, after all, has to be appropriately resolved by its own people and government through their own efforts of dialogue and consultation."

==== 31 October 2007 ====
More than 100 Buddhist monks marched through the central town of Pakokku, 370 miles (600 km) northwest of Yangon. This was the first time they have returned to the streets since the crackdown by the junta in September. One monk who was on the march told the Democratic Voice of Burma, a Norway-based radio station run by dissident journalists: "We are continuing our protest from last month as we have not yet achieved any of the demands we asked for. Our demands are for lower commodity prices, national reconciliation and immediate release of [pro-democracy leader] Aung San Suu Kyi and all the political prisoners." Thai-based director of the Human Rights Education Institute of Burma, Aung Nyo Min, said "This is very significant... we are very encouraged to see the monks are taking up action and taking up peaceful demonstrations in Burma."

==== 2 November 2007 ====
The Burma government is to expel the United Nations' top diplomat in the country, UN officials have said. The military regime told UN's Burma country chief, Charles Petrie, his mandate was not going to be renewed. It is not clear when he will have to leave. Mr Petrie is known to have voiced concerns over the junta's violent break-up of peaceful demonstrations in September: "The events clearly demonstrated the everyday struggle to meet basic needs and the urgent necessity to address the deteriorating humanitarian situation in the country," Mr Petrie's statement said, 24 October, United Nations Day. The US called the expulsion an outrage and an insult.

==== 7 November 2007 ====
Burma's military rulers have given a date for United Nations human rights envoy Paulo Sérgio Pinheiro to begin a five-day visit on 11 and 15 November. Pinheiro, known officially as the UN's special rapporteur on human rights in Burma, has warned: "If they don't give me full co-operation, I'll go to the plane, and I'll go out." Pinheiro had been refused entry since 2003. His visit comes before a meeting of the Association of South-East Asian Nations (Asean).

==== September 2008 ====
A stop symbol

One year after the protests started, small acts of defiance continued. In particular, a 'stop sign' (the palm of a raised hand inside a circle) is being stamped onto banknotes and other places as a reminder of the protests. Several bomb attacks also took place at Yangon throughout the month which the junta blamed was carried out by the NLD.

==== October 2008 ====
On 19 October 2008, a bomb exploded in the Htan Chauk Pin quarter of the Shwepyitha Township of Yangon, near the office of the military junta-backed Union Solidarity and Development Association killing one. According to the New Light of Myanmar, the victim was identified as Thet Oo Win, a former Buddhist monk who participated in the Saffron Revolution, was killed while improvising the bomb at his own residence. The junta blamed the National League for Democracy party of planting that bomb, but experts believed at the time that the opposition was not in a position to carry out such acts amidst the tightly controlled security environment.

== Casualties ==
The number of casualties is not yet clear. According to ABC, the military crackdown claimed hundreds of lives. The official toll remains at 13 killed. Kenji Nagai, a Japanese photo journalist, is believed to currently be the only foreign casualty of the unrest. However, it is possible that the death toll may be many times greater than officially reported.

Speaking before the UN General Assembly, the UN Human Rights Council's Special Rapporteur Paulo Sérgio Pinheiro said that independent sources reported 30 to 40 monks and 50 to 70 civilians killed as well as 200 beaten.

Democratic Voice of Burma puts the number of deaths at 138, basing their figure on a list compiled by the 88 Student Generation group in Myanmar. The executive director of the DVB, Aye Chan Naing, told the Associated Press that "[t]his 138 figure is quite credible because it is based on names of victims, I also think the figure is accurate because of the pictures coming from inside Burma. The way they were shooting into the crowds with machine guns means dozens of people could have died."

Australia's The Age reports that, after two non-protesters were shot in northwest Yangon, "the army came back, gave the families 20,000 kyat (~$20) each and took away the corpses."

Reports forwarded by Times Online stated that the abbot of Ngwe Kyar Yan monastery in north west Yangon was so severely beaten by soldiers "that he died on the spot"; the soldiers had been lining monks up against a wall and smashing each of their heads against the wall in succession before throwing them into trucks.

The final death toll still remained 31 confirmed by the UN human rights envoy to Burma, Paulo Sergio Pinheiro.

== Arrests and releases ==
On 7 October Al Jazeera News reported that at least 1,000 people had been arrested. This figure was provided by Burma's state-run media, the New Light of Myanmar. On 11 October state media reported new figures – that 2,100 people have been arrested and 700 already released. In contrast, foreign sources claim that more than 6,000 people are being held. London-based business news agency Reuters reported about 80 monks and 149 women (believed to be Buddhist nuns) were released by the junta on 3 October 2007.

On 11 November 2008, a court in Insein Prison sentenced 14 88 Generation Students Group members (Arnt Bwe Kyaw, Kyaw Kyaw Htwe aka Marky, Kyaw Min Yu aka Jimmy, Mar Mar Oo, Min Zeya, Nilar Thein, Pannate Tun, Sanda Min aka Shwee, Than Tin aka Kyee Than, Thet Thet Aung, Thin Thin Aye aka Mie Mie, Thet Zaw, Zaw Zaw Min and Zay Ya aka Kalama) arrested during the anti-government protests to 65 years in prison. The government used a variety of laws including the foreign exchange act and the video and electronics act which prohibit Burmese nationals from holding foreign currency or from owning electronic and video equipment without a permit. 26 other activists, including five monks from the Ngwe Kyar Yan monastery in Yangon, were given prison sentences ranging from 6 to 24 years. U Gambira was sentenced to 68 years in prison, at least 12 years of which will be hard labour; other charges against him are still pending.

== Internet control ==
The government attempted to block all websites and services that could carry news or information about Myanmar, barring access to web-based email. However protesters were able to access the Internet anyway and as a result the protests received a never before seen level of international news coverage. Bloggers in Yangon succeeded in circumventing the censors, posting pictures and videos on blogs almost as soon as the protests began. Many of these images were picked up by mainstream news organisations, because bloggers had managed to capture images that no one else was able to get. When Aung San Suu Kyi stepped outside her home in Yangon to greet marching monks and supporters on Saturday, the only pictures of the landmark moment were posted on blogs. Mizzima News, an India-based news group run by exiled dissidents, picked up one of the photos of Aung San Suu Kyi and said more than 50,000 people accessed their website that day. Some Burmese internet users are trying to use internet forums to obtain outside information uncontrolled by the government about their situation. On 28 September it was reported that the government had blocked all access to the Internet. The official explanation is that maintenance is being carried out but Sky News reports that all Internet cafés have also been closed.

By at least midnight local time on 6 October, internet access had been restored to Yangon. Sources in Burma said on 6 October that the internet seems to be working from 22:00 to 05:00 local time.

== International reactions ==
While many countries expressed support for protests and urged the Junta to implement far-reaching reforms, some key countries, such as the People's Republic of China and India, maintained commitment to the notion of noninterference.

=== Sanctions ===
The United States, European Union, and Canada have imposed a number of sanctions on the junta, including a freeze on bank accounts and restrictions on imports of gems and timber.

The United States Department of the Treasury announced sanctions against 14 senior officials of Myanmar. Among those targeted for the sanctions are the junta leader, Senior Gen. Than Shwe, and Deputy Senior Gen. Maung Aye. The action by Treasury will freeze any assets that the individuals targeted have in US banks or other financial institutions under US jurisdiction. The order also prohibits any US citizens from doing business with the designated individuals.

On 27 September the European Union began considering "targeted reinforced sanctions" against the military junta, with current sanctions already including an arms embargo, asset freezes, and visa and trade bans. Their aim was to back sanctions that did not harm the population.

Prime Minister John Howard of Australia, confirmed reports that the Australian Government would deliver targeted financial sanctions against members of the military junta, as well as possibly introducing other measures to further restrict the military leaders.

Nobel Peace Prize laureate Desmond Tutu urged to intervene in the ongoing protests in Myanmar. "China, you have leverage – tell those brutal men to stop their brutality," Tutu said at the Goteborg Book Fair in Sweden. Archbishop Emeritus Tutu said that if China did not take a stance against the military rulers in Myanmar he would "join a campaign to boycott the Beijing Olympics" next year. Calls for a boycott of the 2008 Summer Olympics grew around the world, as more people began to say that increased pressure on the Chinese government was the best way to support the Burmese people.

=== Campaigns ===
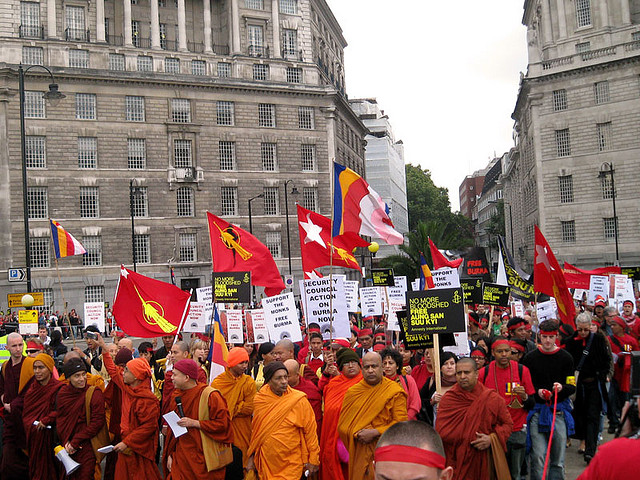
Protesters march in London

Activists and campaign organisations worldwide, including Burma Campaign UK and the US Campaign for Burma along with members of the Support the Monks' Protest in Burma Facebook group (later the Burma Global Action Network), called for 6 October to be designated a Global Day of Action for Burma from 12:00 noon. This event was also held in Sydney (Australia), Montreal, Ottawa, Kitchener and Vancouver (Canada); New York, Washington D.C., San Diego (United States); Dublin (Ireland), Hong Kong and Norway in their consecutive days.

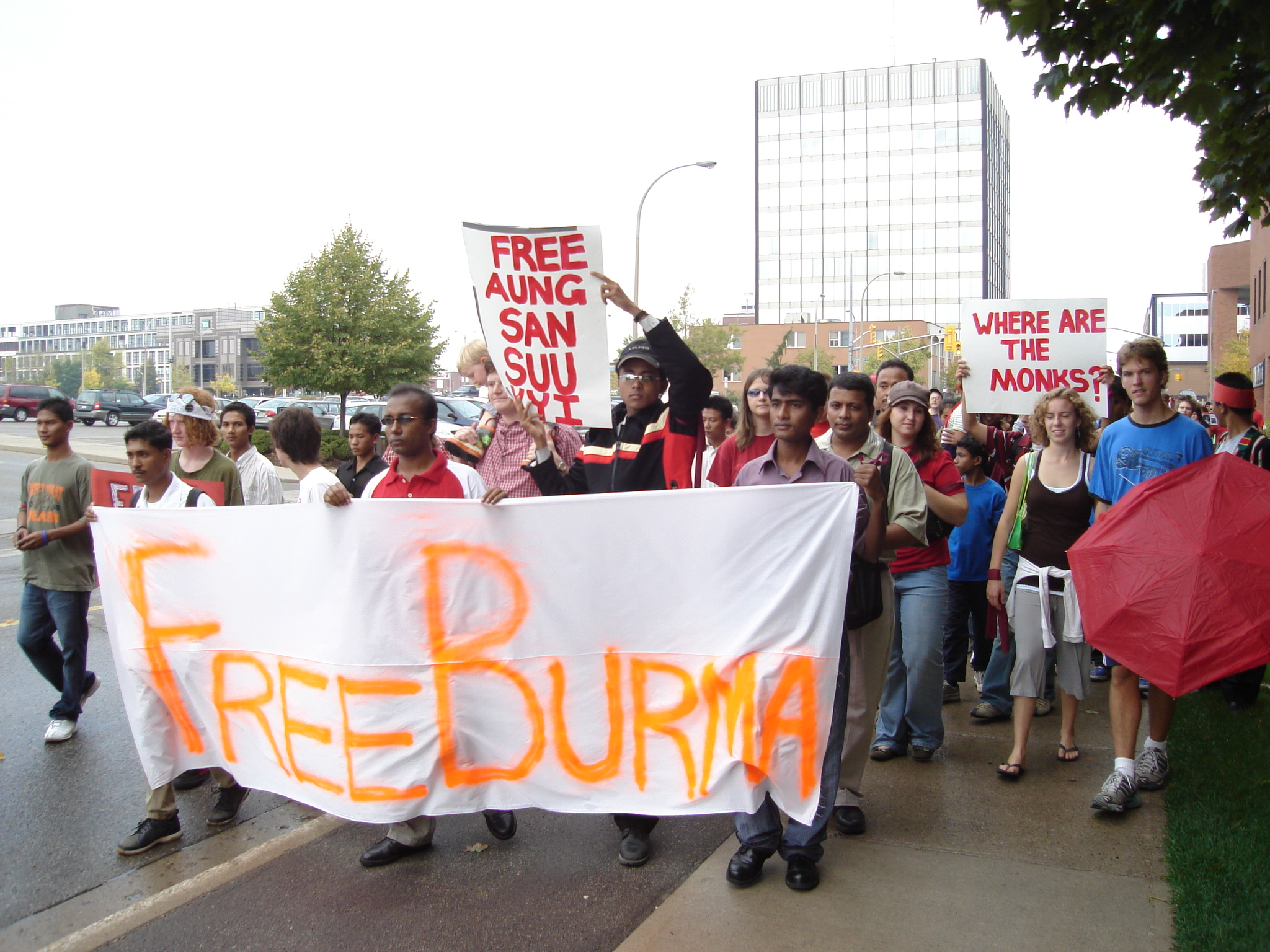
Protesters march in Kitchener, Ontario

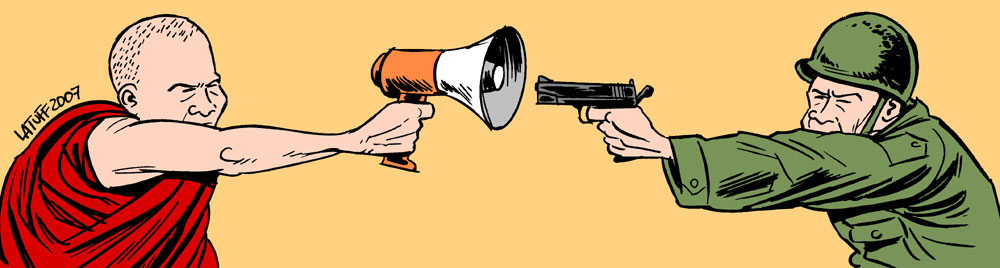
Cartoon by Carlos Latuff

International Bloggers' Day for Burma, a campaign for bloggers to not post to their blogs, was to be on 4 October. Instead they are being asked to put up a banner, underlined with the words Free Burma!.

A worldwide action by bloggers originating in Italy will set a signpost for peace and support the people of Myanmar through the internet. On 4 October 2007 all bloggers and website owners worldwide were called upon to support the "free Burma" campaign by adding a graphic to their website frontdoors and blog only about Myanmar related topics. An internet action likewise has not been reported so far.

A Facebook users group, "Support the Monks' protest in Burma", was formed immediately following the first network reports of monks marching past Aung San Suu Kyi's house. The group grew to over 380,000 members by 9 October and 440,000 at its peak. Some members of the group, who later formed into an official organisation called Burma Global Action Network joined the call for a Global Day of Action for Burma through public demonstrations on 6 October in cities and towns worldwide. Wired magazine noted the significance of the grassroots effort in an article asking whether Facebook has given birth to 'open-source politics.'

A campaign labelled "Panties for Peace" began on 16 October; focussing on the superstitions of Burma's generals, particularly junta chief Than Shwe, that views contact with any item of women's wear as depriving them of their power, women throughout the world have been sending packages to Burmese embassies containing panties; the campaign has spread to Australia, Europe, Singapore and Thailand. People in Burma also began to hang pictures of Than Shwe around the necks of stray dogs, as it is a very strong insult in Burmese tradition to be associated with a dog, and began to spray anti-junta graffiti in bus and train stations, with slogans such as "killer Than Shwe".

In Australia, James Mathison from Australian Idol has lent his support, hosting a Free Burma rally on 10 November in Sydney.

While local protests at French oil giant Total Oil's garages were taking place from October on, the first global consumers' boycott of Total Oil (which also owns ELF and FINA) and US-based Chevron (which also owns Texaco, Caltex and Unocal) was called for on 16 November 2007 because the corporations to be able to exploit Yadana natural gas pipeline in southern Burma are paying to the junta an estimated $450million/year and are now lobbying in the US and Europe against government measures to support a democratic transition in Burma. To protect Total's interests, the government has become an obstacle to any serious strengthening of EU measures against Burma. The French government has pushed for the junta to be admitted into international associations, defending Total's investments. The global online initiative hosted by Avaaz.org "to refuse to buy fuel from any Total, Chevron, ELF, FINA, Texaco or Caltex station in our home countries and wherever we travel" was signed by 20,255 people with the aim of delivering 40,000 signatures to the top management of the corporations.

Although Chevron and Total Oil claim that their presence benefits the Burmese population, Aung San Suu Kyi said in Le Monde that "Total has become the main supporter of the Burmese military regime." already in 2005.

== See also ==
- All Burma Monks' Alliance
- Buddhism in Myanmar
- Burma VJ – Reporting from a closed country. Documentary made up of footage taken from the revolution.
- Energy crisis
- Impact of the Arab Spring#Burma/Myanmar – attempts to copy the methods of the 2011 Egyptian revolution
- Myanmar protests (2021–present)
