= Naw Zipporah Sein =

Burmese Karen political activist (1955–2024)

Zipporah Sein
- နီၢ်စံးဖိရၣ်စ့

Vice-President of the Karen National Union
- In office December 2012 – April 2017
- Preceded by: David Tharkabaw
- Succeeded by: Saw Kwe Htoo Win

General Secretary of the Karen National Union
- In office October 2008 – December 2012
- Preceded by: Padoh Mahn Sha Lah Phan
- Succeeded by: Saw Kwe Htoo Win

Personal details
- Born: 1955 Karen State, Burma
- Died: 24 July 2024 (aged 69) Mae Sariang, Thailand
- Party: Karen National Union
- Parent: Tamla Baw
- Occupation: Politician

Naw Zipporah Sein (Burmese: နော်စီဖိုးရာစိန် 1955 – 24 July 2024) was a Burmese Karen political activist who served as Vice-President of the Karen National Union.

== Life and career ==
Zipporah Sein was born in 1955 in Kayin State, Burma, and trained as a teacher before fleeing to Thailand in 1995. From 1998 to 2008, she was the coordinator and executive secretary of the Karen Women's Organization, which describes its mission as helping Karen women refugees. She has been called a "heroine" by the Political Heroes website.

Sein died from ovarian cancer at her home in Mae Sariang on 24 July 2024, at the age of 69.
