= Nant Bwa Bwa Phan =

Nant Bwa Bwa Phan (Burmese: နန့်ဘွားဘွားဖန်း, Pwo Western Karen: နးဘွၩဘွၩဖၩ့) is the United Kingdom representative of the Karen National Union, a political organization representing the Karen ethnic people of Burma. She is also Vice-Chair of the Karen Community Association – UK, and on the board of the European Karen Network. She has previously worked for Burma Campaign UK, and assisting Karen refugees resettled in the United Kingdom.

Her father was Padoh Mahn Sha Lah Phan, the General Secretary of the Karen National Union, who was assassinated on 14 February 2008. With her sister and brothers, Zoya Phan, Saw Say Say Phan and Slone Phan, she set up the Phan Foundation. The Foundation has four main objectives: To alleviate poverty, to provide education, to promote human rights, and to protect Karen culture for the Karen people of Burma.

Her sister Zoya Phan is a high-profile activist, and is International Coordinator at Burma Campaign UK. Zoya Phan's acclaimed autobiography, ‘Little Daughter’, was published in April 2009. It was published in the United States as ‘Undaunted’ in May 2010.
