= Nant (Bex, Switzerland) =

Coordinates: 46.2282284°N 7.1028081°E

Nant is an alpine pasture located in the municipality of Bex, in Switzerland. Its name is often used to describe the small valley itself: "vallon de Nant".
