= Canadian Friends of Burma =

Non-governmental organization in Canada

The Canadian Friends of Burma (French: Les amis canadiens de la Birmanie; CFOB) was a federally incorporated, national non-governmental organization founded in 1991. It was dissolved in 2015

== Objectives ==
The CFOB supported the pro-democracy movement in Burma (also known as Myanmar), in their goal to achieve peace, democracy, human rights and equality in Burma. Its primary objectives are to raise awareness about the political, human rights and socioeconomic situation in Burma and how it pertains to Canadians, as well as to encouraged Canadians to take action and to get involved.

== Activities ==
The CFOB coordinates campaigned and provided assistance to Burma solidarity groups in Canada and abroad, produced educational materials and monitored Canadian relations with Burma. An ongoing dialogue was maintained by the CFOB with the Canadian government with regard to federal policy on Burma.

The organisation also maintained close links with Burmese exiles in Canada and internationally, including Burma's government-in-exile, the student and labor movements, ethnic leaders, journalists, academics and the entire international movement for democracy in Burma. They also acted as a clearinghouse of information about Burma's pro-democracy movement in Canada and works with the Burmese community, and was a member of the Halifax Initiative, a coalition of Canadian non-governmental organizations for public interest work and education on international financial institutions.

== Controversies ==
The organization officially dissolved in 2015 after three years of controversy and inactivity. In 2012 when Tin Maung Htoo, then executive director of CFOB, made controversial remarks about Burma's Rohingya the organization fell into disarray. In early 2013 Rebecca Wolsak wrote about Tin Maung Htoo and the failures of CFOB in Embassy News, "During the weeks of unrest, we were shocked to see Tin Maung Htoo circulating biased and inflammatory materials. He disseminated information that included blanket characterizations of Muslims or Rohingya as jihadists; materials which blamed not individual perpetrators, but whole communities for violent acts. CFOB founders, board, and allies raised repeated concerns about the executive director’s actions, to no avail."

In 2017, Tin Maung Htoo was still claiming that CFOB was an active organization and referred to the Rohingya as Islamist extremists. In February 2021, Tin Maung Htoo claimed that CFOB "disbanded a few years ago when members thought their objectives had been achieved after Suu Kyi came to power."

== See also ==
- National Coalition Government of the Union of Burma
