= Noh Poe =

Noh Poe Nu Po
- Refugee camp
- Location within Thailand
- Coordinates: 15°51′N 98°40′E
- Country: Thailand
- Province: Tak Province
- District: Amphoe Umphang

Population
  - Estimate: approx. 14,000
- Time zone: UTC+7 (UTC+7)

Noh Poe or Nu Po (Karen; Small Lake) is a refugee camp of approximately 14,000 people in the Amphoe Umphang district of Tak Province in Thailand. Located near the Thai border with the Karen state in Burma, it was set up in 1997 to accommodate Karen refugees fleeing fighting between the Burmese and the Karen National Union (KNU) forces. There is a school located in Noh Poe which is significantly cheaper than comparable schools in Burma, and many Karen students go there to complete their education as a result. Refugees cannot leave the camp without the permission of the local Thai government, and chain fences surround the camp to keep people from leaving.

In 2009, a major battle occurred just across the Burmese border in Kawkareik, between the KNU and the combined forces of the Burmese and Democratic Karen Buddhist armies. People in Noh Poe were prepared to flee if the DKBA forces attacked, but no fighting occurred there.
