= Burma Campaign UK =

London-based non-governmental organisation (NGO)

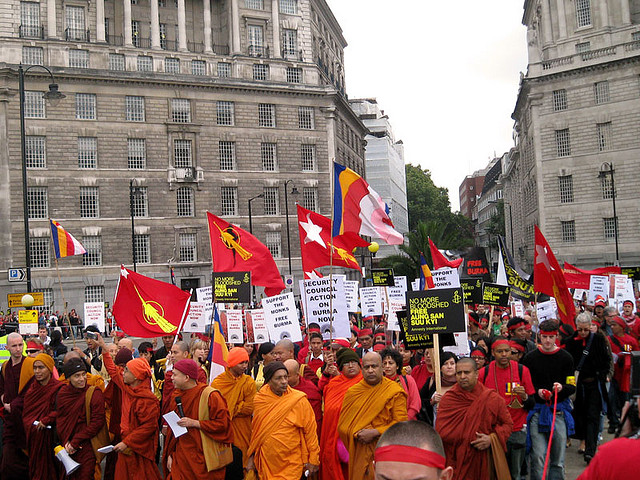
Protesters march in London organised by the Burma Campaign UK in 2007

Burma Campaign UK (BCUK; Burmese: ဘားမားကမ်ပိန်း ယူကေ) founded in 1991 is a London-based non-governmental organisation (NGO) that aims to achieve the restoration of basic human rights and democracy in Burma (also known as Myanmar). BCUK campaigns on behalf of the Burmese pro-democracy movement and is the largest campaigning organisation for Burma in Europe.

It does this by:

- Raising public awareness of issues in Burma
- Increasing international pressure on the UK government, the European Union, the Association of South East Asian Nations (ASEAN) and the United Nations to take action in any way.
- Helping to co-ordinate and build Burma campaign groups elsewhere, creating a global movement for democracy in Burma
- Providing support and training to Burmese exile organisations and individuals, empowering those who have fled the regime to educate others and raise awareness of the suffering in Burma

It has two directors, Anna Roberts and Mark Farmaner. Patrons include Glenys Kinnock, Baroness Helena Kennedy, Maureen Lipman, Roger Lyons, Clive James, Sinéad Cusack and Lord Steel. The organisation is funded by public donations. Burma Campaign UK receives no government funding.

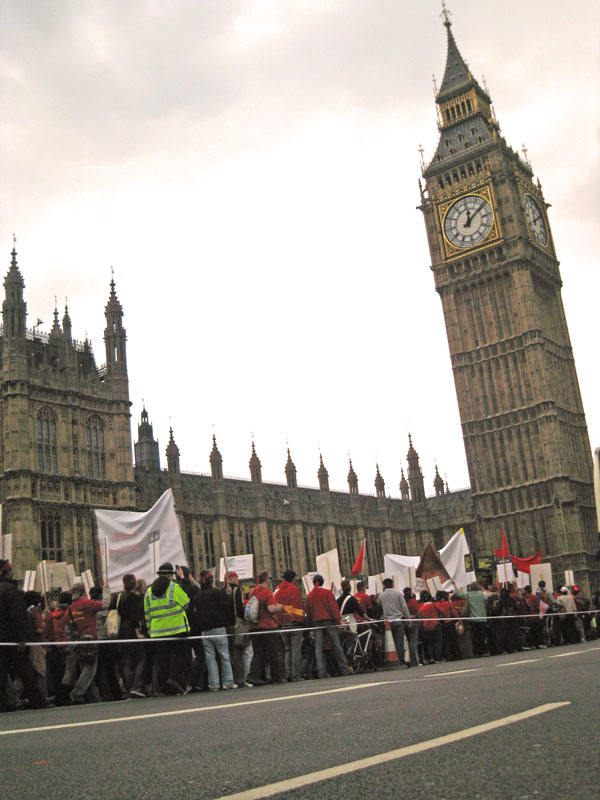
Protesters march past Big Ben in 2007

== Reaction to the 2007 protests ==
Following the 2007 Burmese anti-government protests Burma Campaign UK worked closely with international Burma Groups to help co-ordinate the Global Day of Action for Burma on 6 October 2007 through the "Support The Monks' Protest In Burma" group on Facebook.com, when thousands of people demonstrated in over 25 countries across five continents.

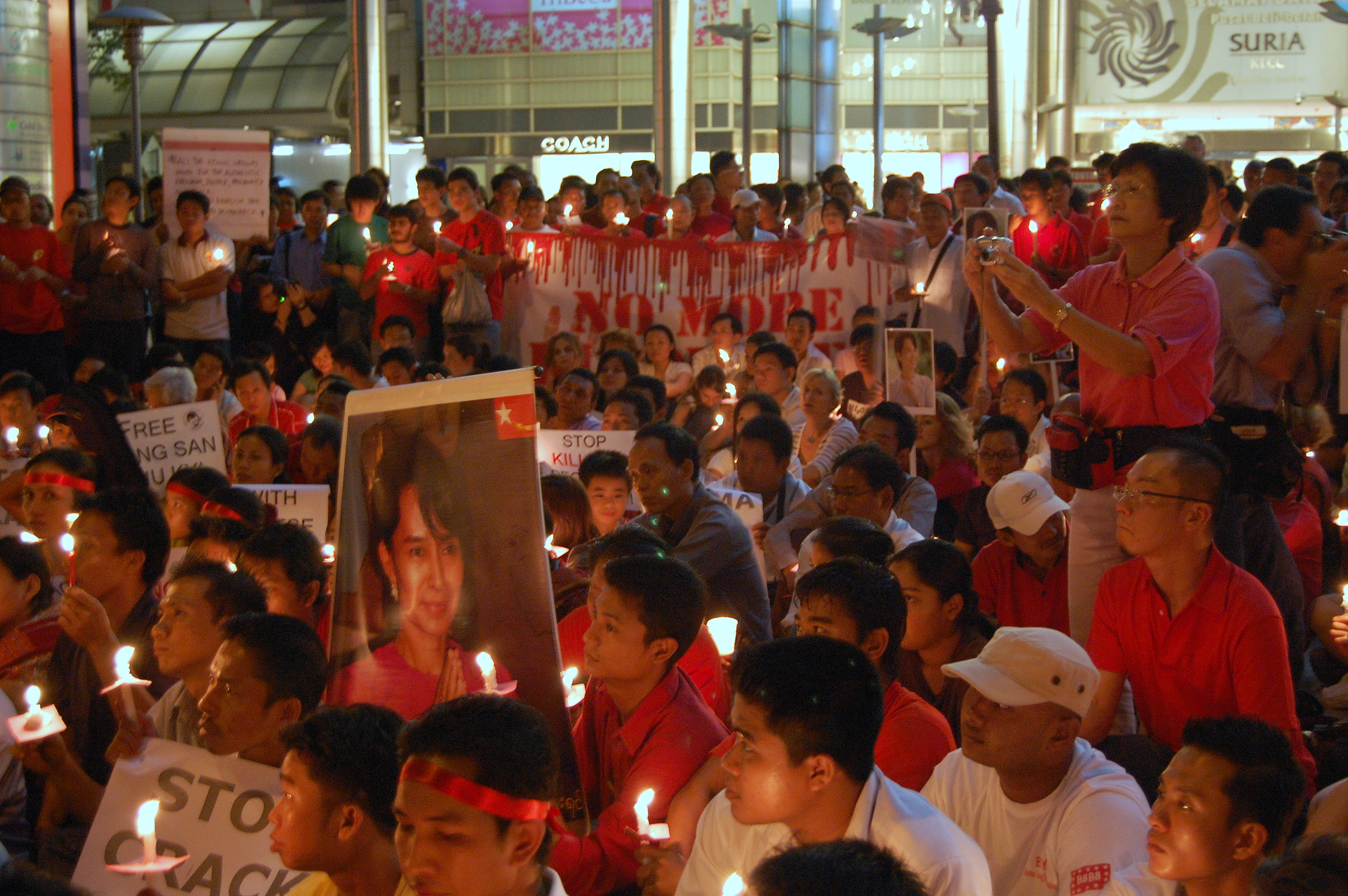
A vigil for Burma in front of the Petronas Twin Towers, 5 October 2007

== Achievements ==
By working with other groups around the world Burma Campaign UK has:

- Persuaded the United Nations Security Council to place Burma on its permanent agenda.
- Successfully lobbied the European Union to increase targeted sanctions against Burma.
- Encouraged more than 100 companies to end their involvement in Burma, including: DHL, Swiss Re, Aon Corporation, Rolls-Royce, British American Tobacco, and Premier Oil.

== Campaigns ==
- Free Aung San Suu Kyi:

This is linked with another aim of BCUK to free all political prisoners. BCUK set up a petition to be sent to UN Secretary General Ban Ki-moon to make the release of political prisoners in Burma his personal priority.

- Crises in eastern Burma:

The government's repression of individuals and communities residing in eastern Burma has been deemed as ethnic cleansing by BCUK. BCUK also highlights the issues of forced labour in the region and displacement, as 66,000 people have been forced to leave their homes during the past 12 months. Rape is used as a weapon against women and disease is most densely concentrated on Burma's borders, as the regime blocks aid from these communities. Information from numerous sources including the Karen Women's Organisation and Karen Human Rights Group can be found on the BCUK website. BCUK is also pushing for a UN arms embargo against the regime.

- United Nations' Security Council:

Following a report published in 2005 by Václav Havel and Desmond Tutu that showed that Burma fits the criteria for United Nations Security Council (UNSC) intervention. BCUK calls on UNSC members to pass a resolution requiring the regime to work with the United Nations in restoring democracy to Burma, and to release Aung San Suu Kyi and all other political prisoners.

- Aid to Burma:

Burma is one of the most impoverished nations on the planet. The militant regime spends half of its budget on the military and less than $1 per person, per year on education and health care. BCUK is urging the Department For International Development (DFID) to take a more active role in alleviating the immediate suffering and to support the democratic movement.

- Economic sanctions:

BCUK has campaigned for targeted sanctions against the regime for many years. These sanctions are designed to pressure the regime to enter into dialogue with the democracy movement. In 2007 they claimed victory as the European Union imposed new sanctions against the regime. BCUK is now calling for targeted financial sanctions to be imposed against Burma by both the UK and EU. BCUK revealed that in 2008 the number of companies with links to Burma had actually increased.

- Insurance campaign:

Insurance companies from all over the world, including ones from countries with economic sanctions against the regime, help to insure foreign companies in Burma that provide vital income to the regime. Money made from these foreign companies will not go to the starving people, it will be used to fund the military machine that oppresses the people. BCUK advocates, among other aims, that the EU issue a ban on the provision of insurance services from member states to companies inside Burma. Due to pressure from BCUK certain companies have been forced to respond.

- Total Energies (formerly Total Oil):

The French oil company Total began constructing the Yadana gas project in 1992 in partnership with Unocal and the state-owned Myanmar Oil. This joint venture earns the military regime hundreds of millions of dollars every year. BCUK launched an international campaign against the oil company supported by 41 organisations in 18 countries. In September 2007 the French foreign minister Bernard Kouchner stated that he favoured Total pulling out of the country. On January 21, 2022, Total energies announced its decision to withdraw from Myanmar, citing human rights concerns.

== Celebrity support ==
Burma Campaign UK supporters include Damien Rice, Annie Lennox, Maxi Jazz, Emma Thompson, Anna Friel, Tony Robinson, Maureen Lipman, Jay Kay, Joanna Lumley, Esther Rantzen, Kabir Bedi, Sir Ian McKellen and Gillian Anderson.
