= U.S. Campaign for Burma =

U.S. organization

The United States Campaign for Burma (USCB) is a U.S.-based organization to oppose the military dictatorship in Burma.
