= Timeline of the Saffron Revolution =

This article details the chronology of events in the 2007 Burmese anti-government protests.

== Timeline ==
=== Prologue ===
Prior to the summer protests, there had been growing unease in the population regarding the economic distress of the country which has stagnant economic growth and is ranked among the 20 poorest countries in the world according to the United Nations. Many, including the United Nations have blamed the economic problems on the inept leadership of the military junta that spends large amount of money maintaining one of the world's largest armies (said to total more than half the country's annual budget). In late 2006, the cost of basic commodities began rising sharply in Burma with rice, eggs, and cooking oil increasing by 30-40%. According to the UN, one in three children is chronically malnourished, government spending on health and education is among the lowest anywhere in the world, and the average income is below $300 a year. Living a privileged, parallel existence, Burma's military forces appear virtually a "state within a state", subject to none of the severe economic insecurity that afflicts the rest of the country. Many of the high ranking army generals have become immensely rich; as witnessed in the video of the wedding of senior general Than Shwe's daughter, who is shown wearing diamonds worth many millions of dollars.

According to the BBC, on February 22, 2007, a small group of individuals protested the current state of consumer prices in the country. While the protest was small and careful not to be seen as directed at the military junta, officials jailed nine of the protesters. it was the first street protest seen in Rangoon for at least a decade.

=== August 15 - Removal of fuel subsidies ===
On August 15, 2007, the government removed subsidies on fuel causing a rapid and unannounced increase in prices. The government, which has a monopoly on fuel sales, raised prices of fuel from about $1.40 to $2.80 a gallon, and boosted the price of natural gas by about 500%. This increase in fuel prices led to an increase in food prices. Soon afterwards, protesters took to the streets to protest the current conditions.

While the International Monetary Fund and World Bank had been recommending the lifting of subsidies for some time to allow for a free market to determine fuel prices, these organizations did not recommend removing all of the subsidies unannounced. The fuel is sold by Myanma Oil and Gas Enterprise, a state-owned fuel company.

=== Initial demonstrations ===
In response to the increase in fuel prices, citizens protested in demonstrations beginning on August 15. In response to the protests, the government began arresting and beating demonstrators. The government arrested 13 prominent Burmese dissidents including Min Ko Naing, Ko Ko Gyi, Min Zeya, Ko Jimmy, Pyone Cho, Arnt Bwe Kyaw and Ko Mya Aye. The government newspaper New Light of Myanmar reported that these individuals' actions caused civil unrest that "was aimed at undermining peace and security of the State and disrupting the ongoing National Convention. The United States condemned the arrest of these dissidents on August 22 with the State Department's acting spokesman stating "The United States calls for the immediate release of these activists and for an end of the regime's blatant attempt to intimidate and silence those who are engaged in peaceful promotion of democracy and human rights in Burma...We call on the regime to engage in a meaningful dialogue with the leaders of Burma's democracy movement and ethnic minority groups and to make tangible steps toward a transition to civilian democratic rule."

On September 5, 2007, Burmese troops forcibly broke up a peaceful demonstration in Pakokku and injured three monks. The next day, other monks later took government officials as hostages in retaliation. They demanded an apology by the deadline of September 17, but the military refused to apologize. This sparked protests involving increasing numbers of monks in conjunction with the withdrawal of religious services for the military. Their role in the protests has been significant due to the reverence paid to them by the civilian population and the military. After these events, protests began spreading across Myanmar, including Yangon (also known as Rangoon), Sittwe, Pakokku and Mandalay.

=== Escalation ===
On September 22, around two thousand monks marched through Yangon and ten thousand through Mandalay, with other demonstrations in five townships across Myanmar. Those marching through the capital were allowed to pass the house of Nobel peace laureate Aung San Suu Kyi. Although still under house arrest, Suu Kyi made a brief public appearance at the gate of her residence to accept the blessings of the Buddhist monks.

On September 23, 150 nuns joined the protests in Yangon. On that day, some 15,000 Buddhist monks and laymen marched through the streets of Yangon in the sixth day of escalating peaceful protests against the Burmese military regime. The Alliance of All Burmese Buddhist Monks have vowed to continue the protests until the Burmese military junta is deposed.

==== September 24 ====
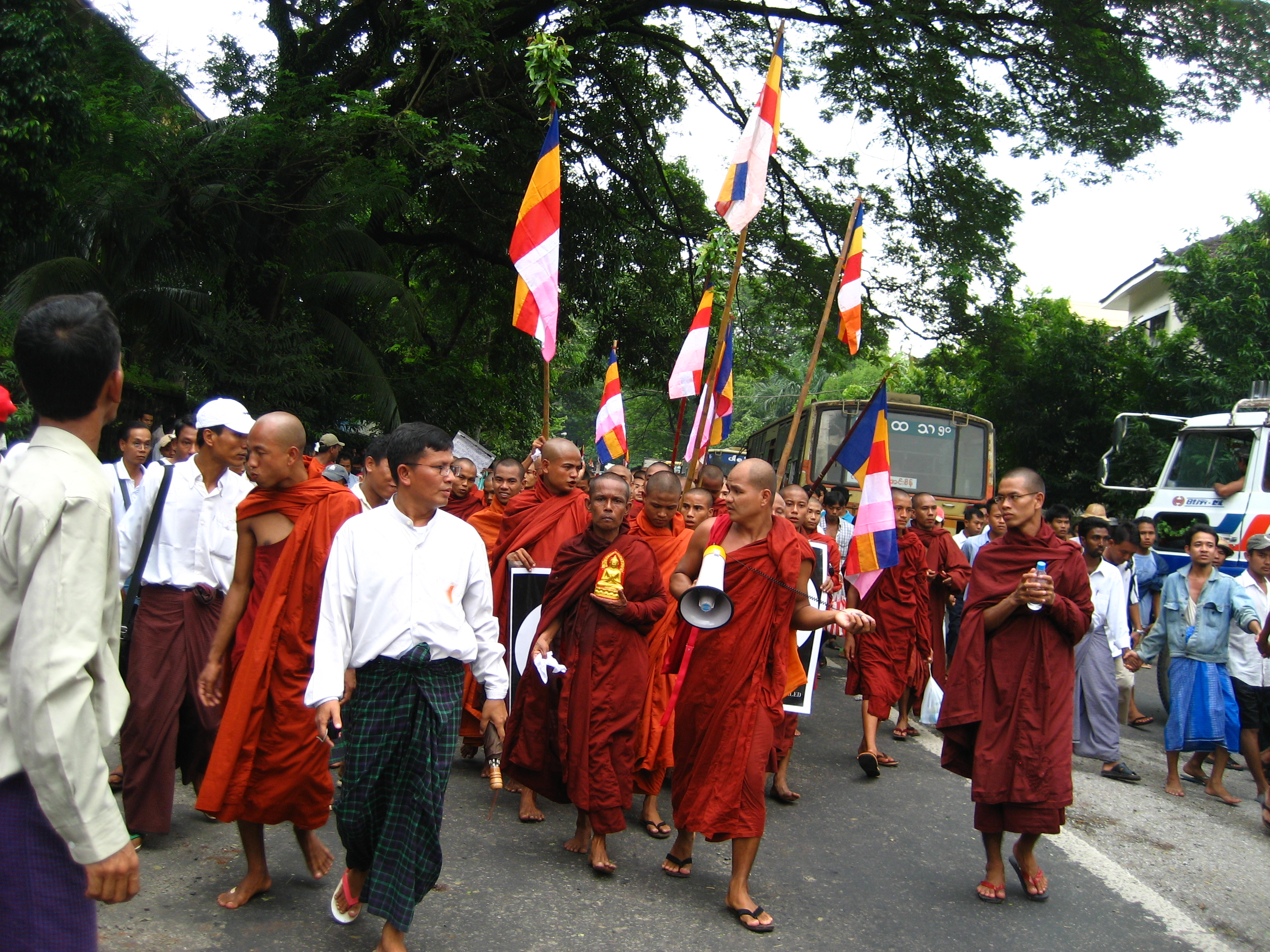
Monks protesting in Yangon, carrying the Buddhist flag

On September 24, eyewitnesses reported between 30,000 and 100,000 people demonstrating in Yangon, making the event the largest Burmese anti-government protest in twenty years. BBC reported that two locally well-known actors, comedian Zargana and film star Kyaw Thu, went to Yangon's golden Shwedagon Pagoda early on Monday to offer food and water to the monks before they started their march. The marches occurred simultaneously in at least 25 cities across Myanmar, with columns of monks stretching up to 1-kilometer (0.62 mi). At the end of the march, approximately 1,000 monks arrived to greet Aung San Suu Kyi's home but were denied access by police. They chanted prayers before peacefully moving off. Later that day, the military junta's Minister for Religion, Brigadier General Thura Myint Maung, warned the Buddhist monks leading the protests not to go beyond their "rules and regulations".

Meanwhile, U.S. President George W. Bush was expected to introduce further unilateral sanctions against the Burmese leaders during his speech to the UN General Assembly. It has been noted that the Bush administration hopes to further embolden the protesters and encourage other countries to follow its lead. The Dalai Lama of Tibet also gave his blessing to the monks in their bid for greater freedom and democracy.

==== September 25 ====
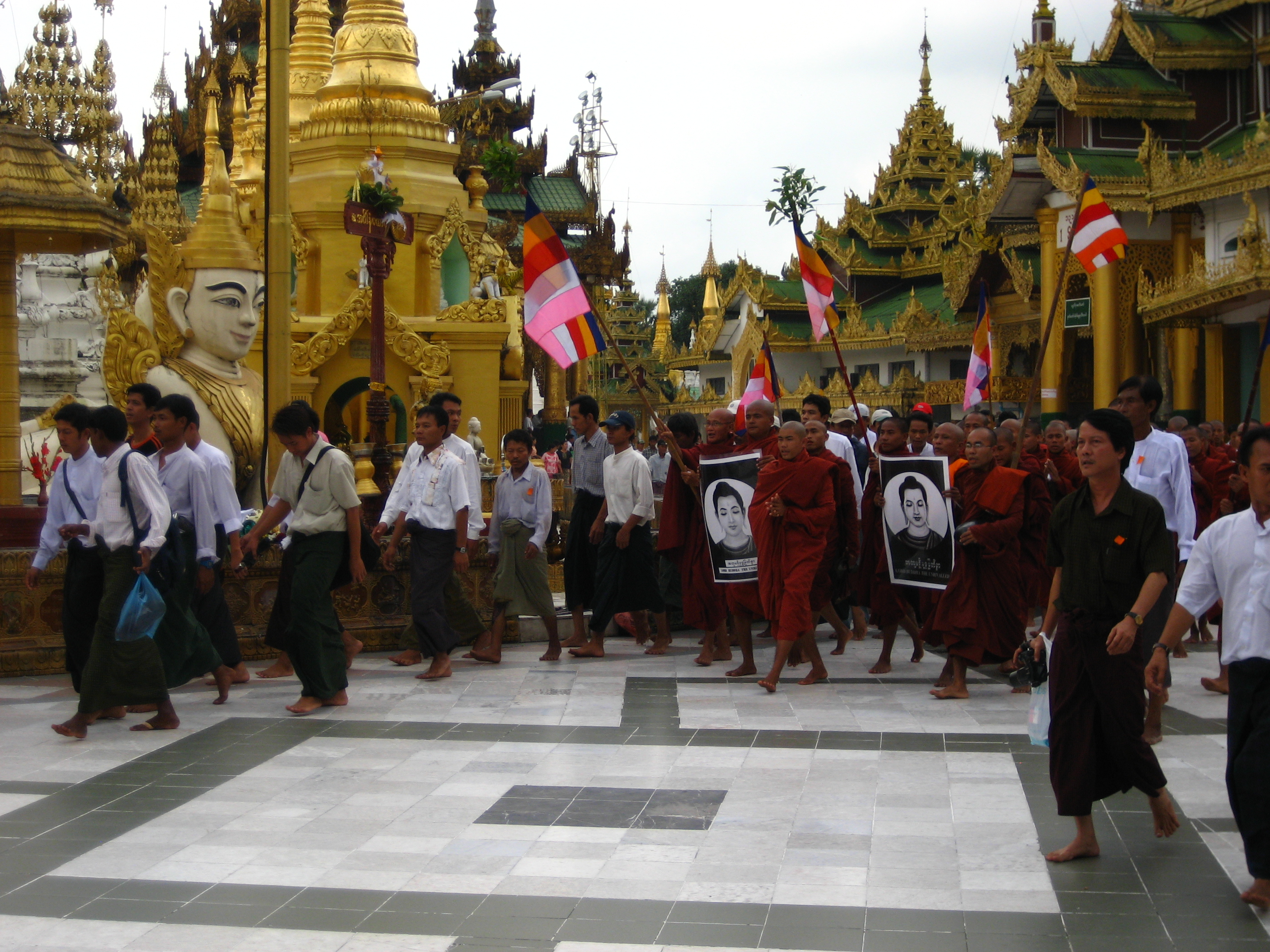
Protesters at Shwedagon Pagoda in Yangon.

On September 25, the junta threatened demonstrators with military force and placed army trucks at Shwedagon Pagoda, the assembly point for monks leading the protests. Witnesses said 5,000 monks and laypeople still marched into the Shwedagon. Civilians were forming a human shield around the monks; Reuters quotes one eyewitness: "They are marching down the streets, with the monks in the middle and ordinary people either side - they are shielding them, forming a human chain." Vehicles mounted with loudspeakers toured central Yangon, blaring warnings of military action. "People are not to follow, encourage or take part in these marches. Action will be taken against those who violate this order," the broadcasts said, invoking a law allowing the use of military force to break up illegal protests. Reuters reported that the detained democracy leader Aung San Suu Kyi had been moved to the Insein prison on Sunday, a day after she appeared in front of her house to greet marching monks.

Effective September 26, Myanmar's junta imposed dusk-till-dawn curfews on the country's two largest cities of Yangon and Mandalay. Additionally, gatherings of more than five people were prohibited. Meanwhile, truckloads of armed soldiers and riot police were sent into Yangon.

=== Junta crack-down ===
==== September 26 ====
On September 26 pro-democracy figure Win Naing was arrested at his home in Yangon around 2:30 a.m. after being seen providing food and water to the protesting monks but was released from jail after one night, according to an anonymous friend and Western diplomat. Win Naing is in his 70s and had been arrested on March 8 for holding a press conference with Burmese demonstrators against the national economic hardships. Prominent Burmese comedian Zargana was also arrested overnight. Troops barricaded Shwedagon Pagoda and attacked a group of 700 protesters with batons and tear gas. The police, beating their shields with batons, chased some of the monks and some 200 supporters, while others tried to remain in place near the eastern gate of the pagoda complex. Troops then sealed off the area around the pagoda, attempting to prevent the monks from making further protests. This failed to stop the marches, with up to 5,000 monks progressing through Yangon; some wearing masks in anticipation of tear gas being used.

Later in the day there were reports of at least three Buddhist monks and one woman confirmed killed in the firing by security forces in Yangon when thousands of people led by Buddhist monks continued their protest against the military junta. A doctor in Yangon's general hospital confirmed that three injured monks have been admitted to the hospital after they were beaten up severely by the riot police at Shwedagon pagoda. The Swedish National Radio correspondent in Yangon reported that more than 300 people, many of whom are monks, have been detained. He also reported about a new kind of sentiment in Yangon: "People come up to me quite spontaneously and voice their opinion in a way they never did before." ... "People feel great admiration for the brave monks" The Burma Campaign UK said its sources had reported the junta ordering large numbers of maroon monastic robes and telling soldiers to shave their heads, possibly to infiltrate the monks.

==== September 27 ====
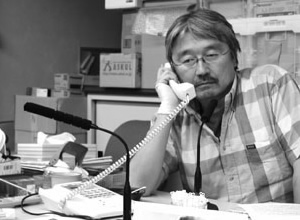
The Japanese reporter Kenji Nagai is believed to be the only foreign casualty during the crackdown.

On September 27, the junta security forces began raiding monasteries across the country to quell the protests, arresting at least 200 monks in Yangon and 500 more in the northeast. There are reports that security forces raided at least five Buddhist monasteries including Ngwe Kya Yan in #3 Block 13th Street, South Okklapah Township and arrested over 200 monks. Security forces broke the wall of Ngwe Kya Yan monastery in a raid at about 0:15 a.m. (local time) Thursday morning. Several monks were injured during a clash between the security forces and the monks. "Bleeding monks were forced into a vehicle. They couldn't cover themselves," a local resident told Mizzima. During the two-hour raid last night, monks rang the alarm bell and screamed for help. As the army has announced it would shoot anybody breaking the curfew, civilians did not dare to come to the aid of monks. Simultaneously, the army raided four other monasteries in parts of Yangon and arrested several monks. Sources confirmed that the army had raided the six storied Religious Science Monastery in Chaukhtatgyi Pagoda, Moe Kaung Monastery in Yan Kin township, Maggin Monastery in Thingankyun township, and Thein Phyu monastery in Thein Phyu area and arrested several monks. An anonymous diplomat also said the junta claimed soldiers now had the monks "under control" and "would now turn their attention to civilian protesters".

As the day moved on, by some accounts there were 50,000 protesters in Yangon. Protesters bleeding from beatings by security forces are seen scattering and fleeing in Sule. Security forces are reported to be preparing to use insect spray to crack down on protesters. Eyewitnesses said fire engines and insect spray carrier trucks were seen near Theingyi market in downtown Yangon. The BBC received unconfirmed reports that fire crews were ordered to fill their machines with insecticide.

According to several news media the armed forces gave the protesters 10 minutes to disperse or face extreme action. The radio station Democratic Voice of Burma reported that nine civilians, including Japanese photographer Kenji Nagai, had been shot and killed by the armed forces. Nagai was working for APF Tsushin, a media company based in Tokyo. The Japanese embassy in Myanmar later confirmed Nagai's death. Amateur video showing Nagai apparently being deliberately shot was aired on Japanese television. Later footage also showed how a Burmese soldier took Nagai's video camera.

Soldiers fired both into the air and directly at students marching toward a high school in Tamwe township in Yangon. Primary school children were inside the school at the time and were reportedly hit by bullets, as were parents arriving to pick up their children. Unconfirmed eyewitness reports say 100 people were shot. Up to 300 of the students outside were arrested after a military truck rammed into the crowd.

Some 50,000 protesters are reported to have demonstrated peacefully in Akyab while soldiers were stationed at seven key places, including government buildings, Lawkanada temple, and Akyi Tong Kong temple.

In the evening, the Burmese state television reported that nine people have been killed in a force crackdown on pro-democracy protesters in Yangon. It added that eleven demonstrators and 31 soldiers had been injured.

At the end of the day, it was reported that the junta has formed new regiments to crack down on protesters. According to sources close to the military, Senior General Than Shwe is now directly commanding soldiers after several commanders refused to use force to crack down on protesters. UK newspaper The Guardian published a report of a letter received by Burmese exiles in Thailand. The letter, allegedly written by disgruntled military officers, expressed support for the protests and read in part, "On behalf of the armed forces, we declare our support for the non-violent action of the Buddhist monks and members of the public and their peaceful expression...". The letter also announced the formation of a group called the Public Patriot Army Association. The Guardian was unable to confirm the authenticity of the letter itself before the story was published.

There are unconfirmed reports that Than Shwe's family have fled to a foreign country. A chartered Air Bagan flight carrying eight special passengers landed in Vientiane, Laos, at 6 p.m. (local time). Air Bagan is owned by Than Shwe's right hand business tycoon Tay Za.

The United Nations' special envoy to Myanmar, Ibrahim Gambari, was allowed into the country after the Burmese authorities bowed to international pressure. He was sent to Myanmar after the Security Council convened in New York over the crisis to call for restraint.

==== September 28 ====
On September 28, Yangon was unusually empty as people were afraid of violent reprisals from the army. President Gloria Macapagal Arroyo urged Myanmar "to take steps toward democracy". U.S. envoys called on China to use its influence with Myanmar.

The Myanmar government attempted to dampen public awareness and communications around the protests by cutting Internet access. Troops specifically targeted those caught carrying cameras and beat them. On September 28, after the killing of Japanese photographer Kenji Nagai by the junta, Japanese Prime Minister Yasuo Fukuda said he regretted the killing and demanded a full explanation of his death. The Association of Southeast Asian Nations was urged to join the push for a UN mission to Myanmar, while the United Nations Security Council urged restraint from the government.

There are reports that Burmese troops from middle Myanmar started to march towards Yangon. The troops were from the Central Command based in Taungoo and the South East Command. It was not clear if the troops were marching to reinforce or to challenge the troops in Yangon for shooting the Buddhist monks.

Vice Senior-General Maung Aye, Than Shwe's second in command and the commander in chief of the army, reportedly disagreed with the violent approach taken against protestors, and is reported to be scheduled to meet with Aung San Suu Kyi, who was reportedly taken to Yemon Military Camp on the outskirts of Yangon. Another report claimed Maung Aye had staged a coup against Than Shwe, that his troops were guarding Aung San Suu Kyi's home, and that diplomatic sources said that Aung San Suu Kyi had been moved to a police academy compound outside Yangon; although no independent confirmation has been made on the report.

Helfen ohne Grenzen (Help without Frontiers) reported that "Soldiers from the 66th LID (Light Infantry Division) have turned their weapons against other government troops and possibly police in North Okkalappa township in Yangon and are defending the protesters. At present unsure how many soldiers involved." While soldiers from 33rd LID in Mandalay are also reported to have refused orders to take actions against protesters, other reports state many soldiers remained in their barracks. Later reports stated that soldiers from the 99th LID were being sent in to confront them.

==== September 29 ====
A report warned that the military will attempt "to trick UN envoys by asking their followers to carry out a set-up protest - protesting against the genuine demonstrations. SPDC followers will force the civilians to join in also." The same source states compulsory attendance of one person per family in some parts of the town is being demanded. In view of the Internet blackout, a group of "88-generation activists" are now urging the United Nations, along with the United States and United Kingdom embassies in Yangon to open a one-page Web service via Wi-Fi access to the general public just to submit news photos. The blog site confirms from different sources that soldiers and police were officially ordered not to shoot at the crowd.

It has also been reported that the UN envoys will be meeting Lieutenant Senior General Maung Aye, the second chief of the junta.

The BBC has reported that several hundred people gathered in Yangon and that eyewitness reports said demonstrators were surrounded by security forces and pro-military vigilante groups. United Nations Special Envoy Ibrahim Gambari has arrived in Yangon and was due to fly immediately to Naypyidaw to talk with the junta generals. Eyewitnesses have told the BBC that over 1,000 people were demonstrating against the government. There have been fresh reports of new violence; the French news agency AFP stated that security forces charged a group of around 100 protesters on the Pansoedan bridge in central Yangon. "They beat people so badly," one eyewitness told the agency.

Approximately 5,000 people gathered to demonstrate in Mandalay. The military is reported to have locked up and put most monasteries under guard to prevent egress. People gathered at 80th, 84th, 35th, and 33rd Streets, before joining together; three military trucks followed behind them and tried to break up the demonstrators, arresting one student who attempted to cross the road in front of them. The military forced monks from outside Mandalay to return to their native towns, the military are keeping the homes of NLD Party leaders under guard. Peaceful demonstrations were reported in Mandalay, no shooting was reported. The Ngwe Kyar Yan Monastery in South Okkalarpa which was subject to a raid some days ago is now being repaired, some believe, in an effort to eliminate evidence. A dedicated group of anti-riot troops is reported to have been formed within Brigate-77 led by Col. Thein Han under Minister Aung Thaung and General Htay Oo's supervision. Agricultural Minister General Maung Oo and Minister of Information Brig. General Kyaw Hsan is said to be in charge of arresting monks at night.

Only an hour after his scheduled arrival at Yangon, it was reported that Ibrahim Gambari, the UN Secretary-General's special adviser on Myanmar, had arrived in Naypyidaw to talk with the junta leaders. White House National Security Council Spokesman Gordon Johndroe has stated that "We have concerns that Mr. Gambari was swiftly moved from Rangoon (Yangon) to the new capital in the interior, far from population centres" and urged the junta to allow Gambari wide access to people, religious leaders and Aung San Suu Kyi. When asked if he expected to meet Suu Kyi, Gambari said: "I expect to meet all the people that I need to meet."

An early report indicates that the junta has denied Gambari a meeting with Aung San Suu Kyi. In addition, the army, late at night, set up a machine-gun nest outside her house.

An audio message from inside Myanmar says crying crematorium workers say they were forced by soldiers to burn injured (but presumably still living) protesters and civilians to death in YaeWay crematorium on the outskirts of Yangon. The Times Online later reported that it was "widely accepted that the cremations began on the night of Friday, September 28", but the reports of people being burned alive were being "treated with extreme caution by independent observers and have not been verified". In Yangon, soldiers rerouted the Sule bus stop to Thamada Cinema in an effort to keep people away from Sule pagoda. Some bus drivers were not informed of this change, and passengers getting off at the old stop were beaten upon dismounting. In Mandalay, non-monk prisoners were taken to a field and a barber was asked to shave their heads so that they could be dressed as monks and forced to create confusion and mistrust of real monks.

Monks and civilians are reported to have called diplomats to state that troops had arrived at three monasteries but had been prevented from entering by local residents who had massed outside. Making threats of returning in larger numbers, the soldiers then departed.

Mizzima news reported that in Mandalay, the NLD divisional organising committee member Win Mya Mya was arrested by police sub-Inspector Tun Lwin Naung at 11 p.m. last night at her home. "She seemed to know in advance of her imminent arrest. She is prepared and took her clothes with her," her sister Tin Win Yee, told reporters, "I am worried about her. This month is the period of Ramadan and she is being treated for her injury sustained in the Depayin incident".

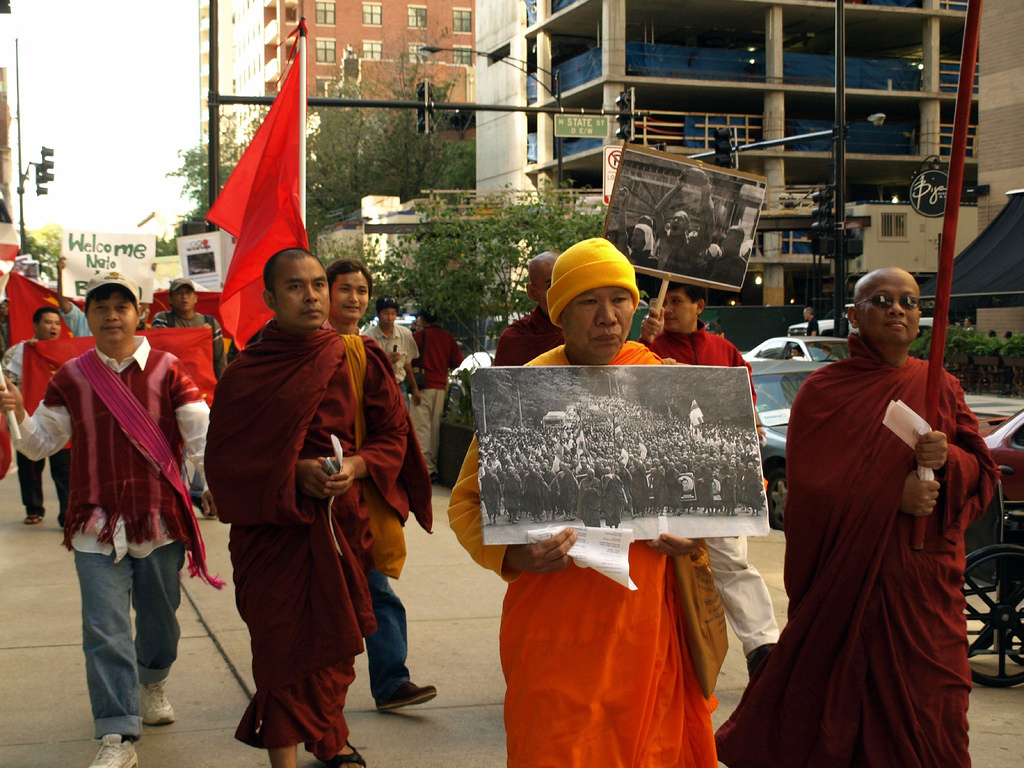
A Burmese protest march in Chicago

Citizens in Myitkyina and other townships in northern Myanmar were coerced into joining pro-government rallies designed to manufacture a show of support for a national convention, though most of the speeches were simply condemnations from junta leaders of the uprisings. Two people from each household were required to attend. "We were warned that we would be punished if we didn't come to the rally. So we attended it because we were afraid," said one resident.

Ngwe Kyar Yan Monastery in Rangoon, where some 200 monks were detained in the early morning two days earlier, is reported to have been looted by soldiers. Everything of value is said to have been removed, including forty or more Buddha statues and the head of one of the largest Buddhas which contains valuable jewels.

The largest demonstration in the country at Kyaukpadaung, Mandalay Division, numbered about 30,000 and was led by around 1,000 monks. The demonstrators marched peacefully despite heavy presence by security forces and military troops.

Some 10,000 farmers in Wra Ma, 30 miles north of Taungup, southern Rakhine State, were reported to have joined hands to protest against the government. The demonstrators are said to have been angry at the government's action against monks in Yangon. The report states the authorities in Taungup sent a platoon of police to the village soon after they received the information about the demonstration.

==== September 30 ====
Contrary to earlier reports, UN envoy Ibrahim Gambari has at last been allowed to meet with imprisoned Nobel laureate and elected leader Aung San Suu Kyi. The two spoke for ninety minutes at the State guest house in Yangon after Gambari returned from talks with the junta in the more remote capital of Naypyidaw. Gambari met with acting Prime Minister Thein Sein, Culture Minister Khin Aung Myint and Information Minister Kyaw Hsan, but has not been given audience with senior general Than Shwe, which could mean that either Than Shwe is boycotting the UN's right to involvement by not meeting Gambari personally or, in line with earlier, unconfirmed reports, that there are rifts developing in the upper levels of power within the junta and the other three figures now hold more power.

Following telephone talks with the UK Prime Minister Gordon Brown, the Premier of China, Wen Jiabao, announced: "China hopes all parties concerned in Myanmar show restraint, resume stability through peaceful means as soon as possible, promote domestic reconciliation and achieve democracy and development". Javier Solana, the European Union's foreign policy chief, urged China to lean harder on Myanmar. Mark Canning, the United Kingdom's ambassador in Myanmar, told the BBC of the deep underlying political and economic reasons for the demonstrations, which he said would not go away easily; "The cork has been put in the bottle, but the pressures are still there."

Meanwhile, the former US ambassador to the United Nations John Bolton, attending Britain's opposition Conservative Party conference in Blackpool, told BBC television that China is the key to political change in Myanmar, not UN envoy Ibrahim Gambari who has met the military junta.

Colonel Hla Win, a central member of the military junta, is reportedly interested in seeking political asylum in Norway. The colonel is said to have defected recently, and is now hiding in the jungle with rebels of the Karen people. The colonel defected after being ordered to raid two monasteries and detain hundreds of monks. According to the colonel, these monks were to be killed and dumped in the jungle.

An eyewitness in Yangon says a monastery on Wei-za-yan-tar Road was raided early this morning. Monks studying inside were ordered out and one by one had their heads bashed against the brick wall of the monastery. Their robes were torn off and they were thrown in trucks and driven away. The head monk is confirmed to have died later that day. Only 10 of 200 remained afterward, hiding inside, and the ground was covered with blood. Many civilians who had gathered to help were held back by the military with bayonets.

The Japanese Deputy Foreign Minister Mitoji Yabunaka, in Myanmar because of the death of Kenji Nagai, arrived in Naypyidaw to speak to government leaders.

==== October 1 ====
The barricades around the Shwedagon Pagoda were removed, witnesses told Reuters, but soldiers were still stationed at the four entrances. Monks say at least five of their brethren have been killed during the clashes with security forces during the protests. Eyewitnesses say troops and police are still positioned at many street corners and key locations around Yangon, making it impossible for demonstrators to gather.

The United Nations envoy Ibrahim Gambari is still waiting to see Myanmar's military junta chief, Than Shwe; it is not clear why he has not yet been granted an audience. Mark Canning, the British ambassador to Myanmar, says China is pushing hard for Gambari's mission to be as long and as far-reaching as possible.

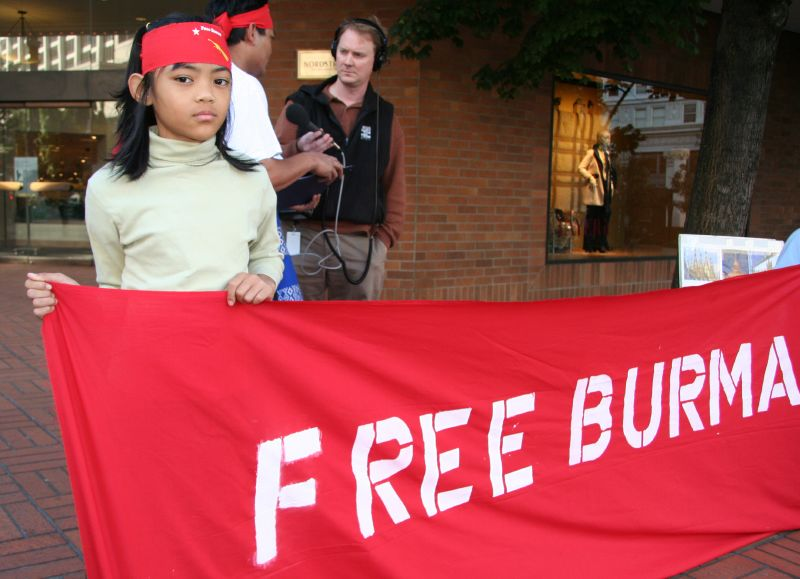
A "Free Burma" banner in Portland, Oregon.

Thousands of heavily armed soldiers are reported to be patrolling the streets of Yangon, and there are no signs of protests against the junta. The troops are stopping pedestrians and car drivers and searching them for cameras. The internet and mobile phone networks are still largely disrupted. General Than Shwe is expected to meet Ibrahim Gambari on Tuesday, officials say.

Around 4,000 monks are said to have been rounded up by the military during the last week in an attempt to stamp out the protests. They are being held at a disused race course and a technical college. A BBC report said sources from a government-sponsored militia stated they would soon be moved away from Yangon. The monks have been disrobed and are shackled, sources told the BBC Radio Burmese service. The Democratic Voice of Burma, the banned opposition broadcaster, has published a photograph which they say shows the body of a monk floating near the mouth of the Yangon river.

5,000 protesters are reported to have gathered in the town of Man Aung, Rakhine State, in the morning. At 9 a.m. they marched while holding two banners displaying their demands; for the release of all political prisoners, a reduction in commodity prices, and national reconciliation. The demonstration finished at 11 a.m.

Three people were arrested at a protest in Sanchaung Township in Yangon a report in The Irrawaddy stated.

==== October 2 ====
Ibrahim Gambari met with Aung San Suu Kyi for a second time, just hours after returning from talks with Than Shwe in Naypyidaw, where he conveyed concerns over the violent crackdown.

A report about imprisoned monks in Myanmar stated they were refusing to touch food given them by the military, and by doing so symbolically maintain their boycott of the regime.

Myanmar prime minister General Soe Win, reportedly died of leukemia in Rangoon Defense Hospital, Mingladon, Yangon. But other sources claimed the rumours were false.

The Human Rights Council met and discussed the situation in Myanmar during a Special session, and passed a resolution deploring the violent repression of peaceful demonstrations, and urging the release of all those arrested during the demonstrations.

==== October 3 ====
A BBC report stated Gambari is currently in Singapore for a brief meeting with Prime Minister Lee Hsien Loong, but has not spoken with journalists. The report stated he is preparing a key report on his talks with Burma's leaders and is likely to brief the UN Security Council later this week. A spokeswoman said that he will meet UN Secretary General Ban Ki-moon on Thursday and may brief the Security Council on Friday, the French news agency AFP said.

Reports from Yangon have stated some 25 monks were arrested by security forces in a raid on a temple overnight. As a result of the military crackdown on anti-government protests, "[s]cores of monks" are trying to leave Yangon, a BBC report stated, many monks were at the railway station because bus drivers refused to carry them as passengers, fearing they would not be allowed petrol. Since daybreak military vehicles fitted with loudspeakers patrolled Rangoon's streets blaring: "We have photographs. We are going to make arrests." Some 80 monks and 149 women thought to be nuns, who had been detained during part of the military's crackdown on protesters, had been freed, Reuters reported.

Riot police and soldiers are reported to be scouring Yangon with photographs to identify and arrest participants in last week's protests. Yangon is patrolled day and night, and troops are still stationed at major road junctions and places like the Sule pagoda, the report states.

A report about nightly actions against demonstrators quoted one resident who said: "The repression is continuing every night. When there are no more witnesses, they drive through the suburbs at night and kill the people." The report stated that there is hunger and misery, many of the monks who demonstrated last week came from Okalapa Township and after suppressing Yangon centre on September 29, troops turned their attention to that township the following day.

==== October 4 ====
The body of the Japanese journalist, Kenji Nagai, has been returned to Japan, a BBC report stated. An autopsy will try to determine the exact cause of his death; Japanese officials said that he was not shot accidentally as Burmese authorities have said, but was shot at close range. APF News, who employed Nagai, are demanding that the camera he held in his hand when he was killed be returned; so far only his second camera, thought to be a back-up, has been returned. Toru Yamaji, the head of APF News, said: "Our biggest task now is to confirm and report on what's in [his camera] and what he wanted to tell the people on his last day".

Another report from the BBC stated that up to 10,000 people, many of them monks who led the protests, had been "rounded up for interrogation in recent days". United States diplomats who visited 15 monasteries found them empty, while others were being barricaded and guarded by soldiers, the report said.

Meanwhile, a Burmese army major has revealed that secret codes were issued ordering the military to shoot and kill protesting monks in Rangoon.

==== October 5 ====
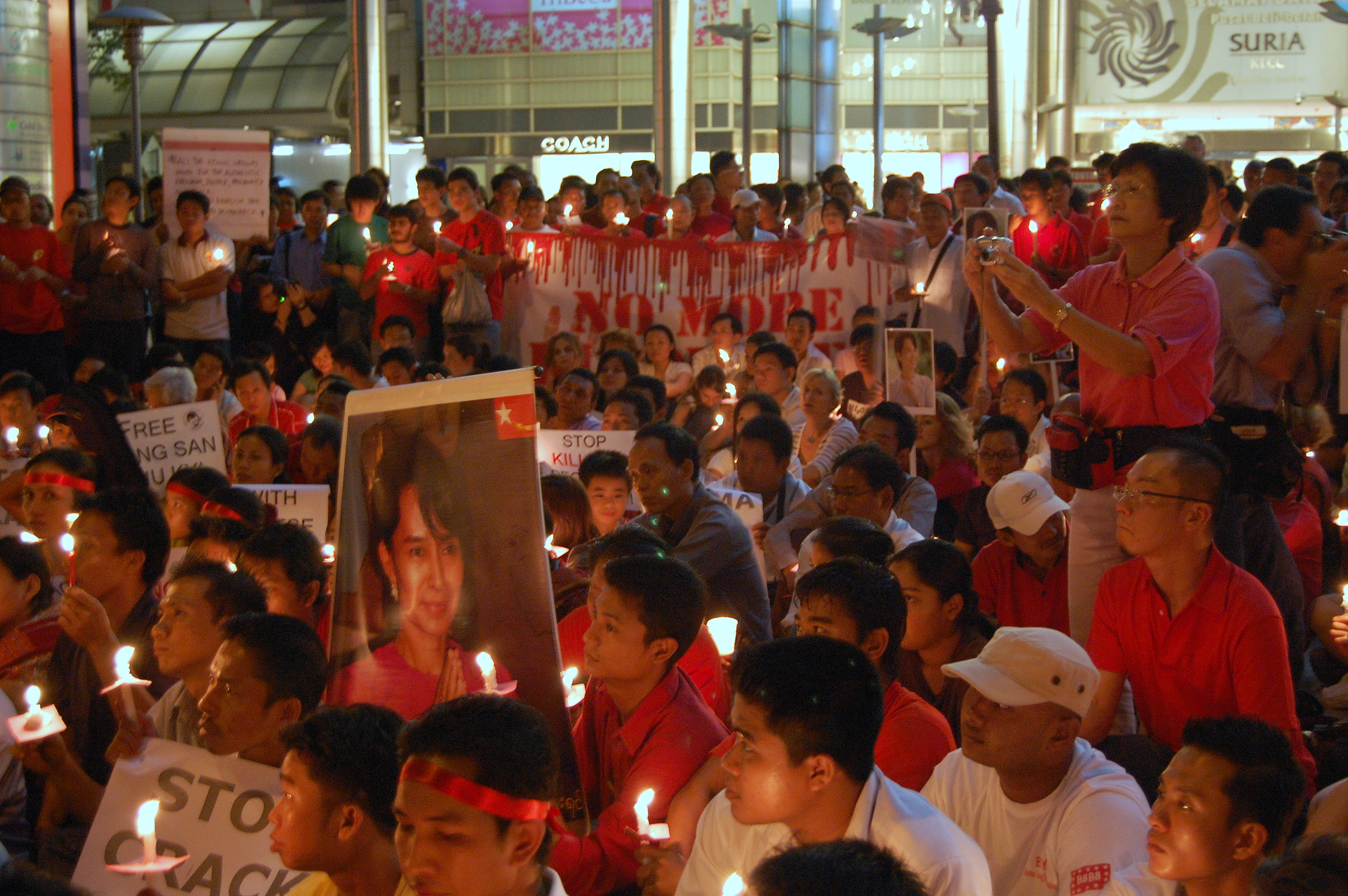
Protesters against the junta crackdown in Myanmar, in Kuala Lumpur, Malaysia on October 5.

The opposition rejected the junta's conditional offer of talks with Aung San Suu Kyi. Shari Villarosa, the United States top diplomat in Myanmar, has been invited to talk with the military leaders. The envoy will 'clearly convey Washington's condemnation of last week's bloody repression' a US spokesperson said. The invitation follows a state television broadcast stating nearly 2,100 people had been arrested over the last week and some 700 had now been freed.

Reuters report that protesters who applauded the demonstrations could face two to five years in jail, while the leaders could face 20 years. The Democratic Voice of Burma forwarded reports of some 50 students who demonstrated in Mandalay who had been sentenced to five years hard labor.

Some 60 troops from a battalion based in Akyab are reported to have been sent to the town of Man Aung, on Man Aung Island, to deal with demonstrations that continued for three days, ending on October 2.

After meeting with many of the parties involved Ibrahim Gambari returned to New York and briefed the Security Council about his visit. The ambassador from Myanmar said that of his country had it had "indeed [experienced] a daunting challenge. However, we have been able to restore stability. The situation has now returned to normalcy. Currently, people all over the country are holding peaceful rallies within the bounds of the law to welcome the successful conclusion of the national convention, which has laid down the fundamental principles for a new constitution, and to demonstrate their aversion to recent provocative demonstrations."

==== October 8 ====
Yangon residents were reported to be "keeping up a low-key resistance", harassing troops by tossing rocks at them. In response, security forces detained some of the rock throwers. The retired General, U Aung Kyi, currently serving as Deputy Minister of Labor, was appointed as an official go-between for talks between Aung San Suu Kyi and the military junta on 8 October 2007.

==== October 9 ====
Ye Min Tun, a foreign ministry official for ten years, told the BBC how "appalling" treatment of Buddhist monks during last month's protests forced him to resign from the military regime. Asked whether he thought the pro-democracy movement was now finished, the diplomat said: "I think it's not the end. I think it's just the beginning of the revolution."

South African president Nelson Mandela withdrew an invitation to Gary Player to host a fundraising golf tournament because of the former British Open champion's business links with Burma.

==== October 10 ====
There are reports that a member of the National League for Democracy, named Win Shwe, 42, died during interrogation in the central Myanmar region of Sagaing. He and five colleagues were arrested on September 26. White House foreign affairs spokesman Gordon Johndroe said "The United States strongly condemns the atrocities committed by the junta and calls for a full investigation into the death of Win Shwe during his detention in Burma. The junta must stop the brutal treatment of its people and peacefully transition to democracy or face new sanctions from the United States." Witnesses claim that security forces are raiding houses in search of anyone whom they suspect to have been involved in the protests. The body of Win Shwe was not released, Thailand-based Assistance Association for Political Prisoners (AAPP) said. "His body was not sent to his family and the interrogators indicated that they had cremated it instead." Fears are being expressed for others still held in police custody.

Sources are claiming that five military generals and more than 400 soldiers of Sikai Division near Mandalay have been jailed for refusing to shoot and beat monks and civilians during the protests. Many civil servants are also staying away from work to show their disapproval of the junta's action. Rolls-Royce also made an official statement today that it was ceasing all business dealings with the junta. It said it would cease aircraft engine repair work and terminate a contract involving the lease of an aircraft to a Burmese airline. A spokesman said last night: "At that point, Rolls-Royce will have no further involvement in Burma."

==== October 11 ====
The Security Council met and issued a statement and reaffirmed its "strong and unwavering support for the Secretary-General's good offices mission", especially the work by Ibrahim Gambari It also "strongly deplore[d] the use of violence against peaceful demonstrations in Myanmar", welcomed the Human Rights Council of 2 October 2007, and "emphasize[d] the importance of the early release of all political prisoners and remaining detainees", as well as urging the junta to prepare for a "genuine dialogue" with democratically elected leader Aung San Suu Kyi. Although a statement does not have the power of a resolution, it requires the consent of all its members and has been seen as a shift in position of China. Official government-run media in Burma called the UN statement "regrettable," and stated that more than half of those arrested during the protests have since been released.

==== October 12 ====
Military rulers have arrested what is thought to be the last four known leaders, part of the "88 Students Generation" activists of the 1988 pro-democracy uprising. Those detained include prominent woman activist Thin Thin Aye (also known as Mie Mie), Aung Htoo and Htay Kywe. Amnesty International has issued a statement expressing grave concern for their safety and for others still being held.

Thousands have attended a "pro-government" rally in Rangoon. It is widely believed to have been organised by the junta and it is claimed that many of the participants are being forced to attend. Burmese dissident groups claim that the numbers who attended the rally is much smaller than the governments figures. They also claim that people have been bussed to the rallies by the junta and coerced with bribes of money and threatened with losing their jobs and homes. AFP news agency also reported that every factory in the city's industrial zone had each been obliged to send 50 participants to the rally.

==== October 13 ====
Amnesty International issued a revised statement saying that six dissidents have now been arrested in Yangon over the weekend. They said: "Continued arrests fly in the face of the promises made this week by the Myanmar authorities to cooperate with the United Nations."

==== October 14 ====
Gambari is expected to arrive in Bangkok to prepare for what he hopes will be a return visit to Myanmar, just two weeks after his last high-profile visit. The US Secretary of State and the White House wanted him to return there ahead of his plans to tour other southeast Asian capitals.

==== October 15 ====
Gambari arrived in Thailand and issued a statement describing the latest arrests in Yangon as "extremely disturbing" [and] "counter to the spirit of mutual engagement" between the UN and Burma. He has a meeting scheduled to meet military officials in Burma in mid November but the UN is hoping that they will allow him to bring the visit forward. Meanwhile, PM Gordon Brown is pushing the EU to propose tougher sanctions on Burma ahead of an EU meeting in Luxembourg. The EU will be discussing the banning of imports of gemstones, timber and metals.

The EU have announced an agreement for further sanctions against the military junta but some have conceded that its leverage with Burma is limited and sanctions have so far controversially steered clear of its energy sector of which French oil giant Total is currently a major investor.

==== October 16 ====
Japan has cancelled funding of more than $4.7 m for a human resources centre based in Rangoon University. Chief Cabinet Secretary Nobutaka Machimura said the decision was made in response to the recent military action in Burma. A White House spokesman today said the US is considering toughening its own existing sanctions. Meanwhile, ASEAN has said it will not consider suspending Myanmar as a member, and rejected any proposal for economic sanctions. Burma says it arrested approximately 100 monks in recent weeks and that only 10 people have died, but it is absolutely clear that the real figures are much much higher.

==== October 17 ====
Three high-profile demonstrators have been released by the Burmese government; Zagana, a prominent comedian along with actor Kyaw Thu, and his wife were said to have been released late on Wednesday. In a published statement the junta stated: "Those who led, got involved in and supported the unrest which broke out in September are being interrogated." [and] "Some are still being called in for questioning and those who should be released will be." Officials now claim that a total of 2,927 people had been detained and nearly 500 were still being held, this is an increase of almost 800 since last official figures released on October 8. Those released had been asked to sign a "pledge" first.

Reports in the Democratic Voice of Burma claim that the NLD party chairman U Kyaw Khine, and secretary Ko Min Aung, have both been sentenced to seven and a half years imprisonment. U Htun Kyi and U Than Pe, two members of the NLD organising committee in Sandoway township, were sentenced to four and half years, while another party member from Gwa township, U Sein Kyaw, is standing trial. A total of around 280 party members were arrested, including 50 members in Kyaukse township in Mandalay Division, while others are reportedly on the run. Whilst reporting the same news, The Irrawaddy added a report about U Indriya, a monk from Sait-Ta-Thuka monastery, who is said to be one of the leaders of a peaceful demonstration in Sittwe. As a result, he has been sentenced to seven and a half years imprisonment.

==== October 18 ====
Two former schoolteachers, Tin Maung Oo and Ni Ni Mai, appeared in court after they spoke out against a pro-government rally in Paung Tal township, Bago division. On October 16 at about 5am, a pro-government group were marching past the teachers house, shouting slogans denouncing the monk-led demonstrations and supporting the National Convention. The protestors stopped at seeing a sign hung outside by Maung Oo, which denounced those who tortured and killed monks and civilians. Ni Ni Mai stood in the doorway and asked the protestors if 'they really agreed with the killing of monks and civilians in Rangoon' at which the protestors stopped chanting slogans and some of them dropped their placards. A leader of the government protest is reported to have taken photographs of the couple and their house; later that day the township police chief and two female police officers came to arrest them. The couple are due to appear in court for sentencing on October 30.

==== October 19 ====
President Bush has announced further sanctions against the Burmese military. He has tightened export controls and frozen more financial assets held by the junta and urged China and India to apply more pressure. In a White House statement he said: "Monks have been beaten and killed. "Thousands of pro-democracy protesters have been arrested". "Burma's rulers continue to defy the world's just demand to stop their vicious persecution". "We are confident that the day is coming when freedom's tide will reach the shores of Burma."

A senior British diplomat told the BBC that some 2,500 people are still being held by the military. British officials also received first-hand accounts of grim conditions under which many detainees are still being held. Night raids are said to be continuing with hundreds being arrested.

==== October 20 ====
Burma's military announced the lifting of a curfew in two main cities, Mandalay and Rangoon. The statement is being widely seen as a sign that the government is confident that it has now gained control of the recent dissent. However it is unclear whether the recent government ban on assemblies of more than five people had also been lifted.

==== October 22 ====
It has been announced that the UN Human rights expert Paolo Sergio Pinheiro is to be allowed to visit Burma. Burmese Foreign Minister Nyan Win wrote to the UN stating that Pinheiro could arrive before mid-November. This will be the first visit by Pinheiro in four years, previously the military junta has refused to give their permission. Pinheiro welcomed news of his invitation, telling Reuters news agency that it was "an important sign that the government wants to engage again in constructive dialogue with the UN and the Human Rights Council". The BBC's Laura Trevelyan reports from the UN that the timing of the invitation is significant, a summit of the Association of South-East Asian Nations (Asean) is due to open on 17 November. The regime may believe that the move could reduce further criticism from members of Asean.

==== October 24 ====
Rights groups report that hundreds of ethnic minority tribespeople are fleeing Burma into the border state of Mizoram, India to escape the military regime. They claim that they are being forced to join pro-government rallies, in some cases at gunpoint, and if they refuse they face fines of up to 10,000 kyats [$7]; while others have been arrested including Christian pastors. Many of the exodus are from the Christian minority ethnic Chin people who say they have been persecuted by the junta for being Christians and non-ethnic Burmese. Although they were initially welcomed in Mizoram after the 1988 military crackdown they now face threats of a pushback, as the Mizos, (who are ethnic cousins of Chins), are now strongly opposing "unrestricted migration from the Chin State" for fear that they may one day be outnumbered by them.

Meanwhile, India has been accused of allowing its strategic and business interests to prevail in Burma, and for failing to put pressure on the generals.

==== October 26 ====
Hundreds of riot police and troops armed with rifles and teargas launchers are said to be back in force on the streets of Rangoon and are also said to be surrounding the Shwedagon and Sule pagodas, that were the focal point of peaceful demonstrations led by Buddhist monks last month. The military police are also said to have large coils of barbed wire ready to block streets, though according to Reuters there are no new protest developments. The troop presence coincides with the end of Buddhist Lent, and is thought to be aimed at preventing new protests. It also comes a day after detained pro-democracy leader Aung San Suu Kyi met a military officer for talks. State Councilor for China, Tang Jiaxuan told Gambari of the UN, (who is expected to return to Burma in early November), that words were the way forward. "The Myanmar issue, after all, has to be appropriately resolved by its own people and government through their own efforts of dialogue and consultation."

==== October 31 ====
More than 100 buddhist monks marched through the central town of Pakokku, 370 miles (600 km) northwest of Yangon. The first time they have returned to the streets since the crack-down by the junta in September. One monk who was on the march told the Democratic Voice of Burma, a Norway-based radio station run by dissident journalists: "We are continuing our protest from last month as we have not yet achieved any of the demands we asked for. "Our demands are for lower commodity prices, national reconciliation and immediate release of [pro-democracy leader] Aung San Suu Kyi and all the political prisoners." Thai-based director of the Human Rights Education Institute of Burma, Aung Nyo Min said "This is very significant... we are very encouraged to see the monks are taking up action and taking up peaceful demonstrations in Burma."

==== November 2 ====
The military regime in Burma are to expel the United Nations' top diplomat in the country, UN officials have said. UN's Burma country chief, Charles Petrie, to Naypyidaw the new capital to tell him his mandate was not going to be renewed. It is not clear when he will have to leave. Mr Petrie is known to have voiced his concerns over the junta's violent break up of peaceful demonstrations in September: "The events clearly demonstrated the everyday struggle to meet basic needs and the urgent necessity to address the deteriorating humanitarian situation in the country," Mr Petrie's statement said, 24 October, United Nations Day.
