= List of Air Nigeria destinations =

Air Nigeria (formerly Nigerian Eagle Airlines and Virgin Nigeria Airways), was the national flag carrier of Nigeria. The airline operates scheduled regional and domestic passenger services. Its base is Murtala Mohammed International Airport, Lagos. The airline is a replacement for defunct Nigeria Airways. Its registered office is in Ikoyi, Lagos State, while its head office is on the 9th floor of Etiebets Place in Ikeja, Lagos State. serves the following destinations (at June 2010):

On 28 September 2004, the Nigerian government and Virgin Group signed an agreement to establish a new airline for Nigeria, to be called Virgin Nigeria Airways. Nigerian institutional investors own 51% of the company and Virgin Atlantic Airways owns 49%. The airline's inaugural flight was on 28 June 2005 from Lagos to London Heathrow using an Airbus A340-300 aircraft.

On 19 August 2008, Virgin Atlantic announced that it was "in talks to sell its 49 percent stake in Virgin Nigeria". It is also reviewing "whether it is appropriate that the Virgin brand should remain linked to Virgin Nigeria". The dispute arose after Virgin Nigeria's domestic operations were moved against its will by the Ministry of Transportation to Terminal 2.

On 17 September 2009, Virgin Nigeria announced on their website they had rebranded as Nigerian Eagle Airlines. Nigerian Eagle Airlines also stated that they plan to focus on domestic and regional flights with further expansion into Europe and eventually the United States of America. Virgin still own 49% of the new Nigerian Eagle Airlines with the remaining 51% by Nigerian investors.

On 2 June 2010, following the acquisition of a majority share in the airline, Jimoh Ibrahim, the new chairman, announced that Nigerian Eagle Airlines had changed its name to Air Nigeria Development Limited and would be known as Air Nigeria.

In December 2011, Air Nigeria maintained services to the following domestic and regional destinations:

^{[Hub]}	Hub
^{[F]}	Future destination
^{[T]}	Terminated destination

City	Country	IATA	ICAO	Airport	Ref
Abidjan	Côte d'Ivoire	ABJ	DIAP	Port Bouet Airport ^{[T]}	
Accra	Ghana	ACC	DGAA	Accra International Airport ^{[T]}	
Abuja	Nigeria	ABV	DNAA	Nnamdi Azikiwe International Airport ^{[T]}	
Banjul	Gambia	BJL	GBYD	Banjul International Airport^{[T]}	
Benin City	Nigeria	BNI	DNBE	Benin Airport ^{[T]}	
Brazzaville	Republic of the Congo	BZV	FCBB	Maya-Maya Airport ^{[T]}	
Calabar	Nigeria	CBQ	DNCA	Margaret Ekpo International Airport ^{[T]}	
Cotonou	Benin	COO	DBBB	Cadjehoun Airport ^{[T]}	
Dakar	Senegal	DKR	GOOY	Léopold Sédar Senghor International Airport ^{[T]}	
Douala	Cameroon	DLA	FKKD	Douala International Airport ^{[T]}	
Dubai	United Arab Emirates	DXB	OMDB	Dubai International Airport ^{[T]}	
Enugu	Nigeria	ENU	DNEN	Akanu Ibiam International Airport ^{[T]}	
Johannesburg	South Africa	JNB	FAJS	OR Tambo International Airport^{[T]}	
Kano	Nigeria	KAN	DNKN	Mallam Aminu Kano International Airport ^{[T]}	
Lagos	Nigeria	LOS	DNMM|	Murtala Muhammed International Airport ^{[Hub]}	
Libreville	Gabon	LBV	FOOL	Libreville International Airport ^{[T]}	
London	United Kingdom	LGW	EGKK	Gatwick Airport^{[T]}	
London	United Kingdom	LHR	EGLL	London Heathrow Airport ^{[T]}	
Monrovia	Liberia	ROB	GLRB	Roberts International Airport ^{[T]}	
Owerri	Nigeria	QOW	DNIM	Sam Mbakwe Airport^{[T]}	
Port Harcourt	Nigeria	PHC	DNPO	Port Harcourt International Airport ^{[T]}	
Port Harcourt	Nigeria	PHG	-	Port Harcourt NAF Base ^{[T]}	
São Tomé	São Tomé and Príncipe	TMS	FPST	São Tomé International Airport ^{[T]}	
Sokoto	Nigeria	SKO	DNSO	Sadiq Abubakar III International Airport ^{[T]}	
Warri	Nigeria	QRW	DNSO	Warri Airport ^{[T]}	
