= Global Fleet Group =

Nigerian conglomerate industry

- Company type: Conglomerate
- Industry: Investments
- Founded: 2003; 23 years ago
- Headquarters: Lagos, Nigeria
- Key people: Jimoh Ibrahim; Chairman & CEO
- Products: Magazines, Hotels, Insurance, Banking, Manufacturing, Transportation

The Global Fleet Group is a large diversified conglomerate in West Africa.

== Overview ==
The Global Fleet Group is a business conglomerate, that is headquartered in Lagos, Nigeria, with interests across a range of sectors in Africa. Current interests include oil and gas, airlines, magazines, insurance, hotels, resorts, real estate, petrol stations, manufacturing and banking. In the financial services sector, the Group owns 100% the shareholding in Energy Bank of Ghana and the former Oceanic Bank of São Tomé.

== Subsidiary companies ==
The Global Fleet Group includes the following subsidiaries, among others:

1. Air Nigeria - Lagos, Nigeria - Formerly Virgin Nigeria
2. Nicon Insurance - Lagos, Nigeria
3. Nigeria Re-Insurance Corporation - Lagos, Nigeria
4. Nicon Luxury Hotel - Abuja, Nigeria - Formerly Le' Meridien Hotel
5. The Nicon Group - Lagos, Nigeria - Holdings include investment companies, schools, real estate holdings, transport companies and others
6. Nicon Properties Limited
7. Global Fleet Oil and Gas - A chain of gasoline stations across Nigeria
8. Global Fleet Building - Lagos, Nigeria - Formerly Allied Bank Building
9. Nicon Hotels - Lagos, Nigeria
10. Global Fleet Industries - Lagos, Nigeria - Formerly HFP Industries Limited
11. Energy Bank - Accra, Ghana - A new commercial bank in Ghana, started operations in February 2011
12. Energy Bank São Tomé - São Tomé, São Tomé and Príncipe - Commercial bank purchased from Oceanic Bank in May 2011 and rebranded to current name.
13. Global Media Mirror Limited - Lagos, Nigeria

== See also ==
- Air Nigeria
- Energy Bank
- Oceanic Bank
