= Fabunmi =

Fabunmi is a surname. Notable people with the surname include:

- L. A. Fabunmi, Nigerian scholar and diplomat
- Olavale Fabunmi (born 1992), Ukrainian footballer
