= Energy Bank Sao Tome and Principe =

Energy Bank, STP
- Company type: Private
- Industry: Financial services
- Predecessor: Oceanic Bank STP
- Founded: 2011
- Headquarters: Sao Tome, Sao Tome
- Number of locations: 3
- Key people: Jimoh Ibrahim (Chairman)
- Products: Loans, Transaction accounts, Savings, Investments, Debit cards
- Owner: Global Fleet Group (88%)
- Number of employees: 35
- Website: www.energybanksaotome.com

Energy Bank Sao Tome e Principe, also referred to as Energy Bank STP, but commonly known as Energy Bank, is a commercial bank in Sao Tome. It is one of the eight commercial banks licensed by the Central Bank of São Tomé and Príncipe, the country's banking regulator.

As of February 2011, Energy Bank is a small financial services provider in Sao Tome. The bank's total assets are estimated at US$10 million. The shareholders' equity is estimated at US$6.8 million.

== History ==
Energy Bank Sao Tome & Principe (STP) commenced operation as Oceanic Bank (STP) on 14 July 2008. Its second branch, in the proximity of the main market was opened on 11 May 2010. A one hundred percent acquisition of the bank was done by Global Fleet (United Kingdom), under the leadership of Dr. Jimoh Ibrahim, OFR - Chairman, which transaction transferred ownership and control of Oceanic Bank in June 2011.

== Ownership ==
The shares of stock of Energy Bank are privately owned. The major shareholders in the bank are (a) the Global Fleet UK, (b) the Nicon Insurance, STP, the two principal shareholders are linked to Jimoh Ibrahim, the Nigerian industrialist and entrepreneur who serves as the bank's Chairman. The shareholding in the bank's stock is depicted in the table below:

Energy Bank Stock Ownership

Rank	Name of Owner	Percentage Ownership
1	Global Fleet, UK United Kingdom	88
2	Nicon Seguros, Sao Tome e Principe	10
3	Others	2
	Total	100.00%

== See also ==
- Economy of Sao Tome
