= L. A. Fabunmi =

Nigerian scholar and diplomat

Lawrence Apalara Fabunmi is a Nigerian scholar and diplomat. He is a former ambassador to Turkey, Zambia and to Poland. Fabunmi was also the pioneer director of the Nigerian Institute of International Affairs, the institute among other things is known for being a source of foreign ministry personnel, including the immediate past minister for foreign affairs, Joy Ogwu.

== Works ==
- Fabunmi, L. A. (1957). "The Sudan in Anglo-Egyptian Relations: A Case Study in Power Politics, 1800-1956". University of London. (PhD thesis, republished as book in 1960 by Longman)
