= Nigeria and the United Nations =

Federal Republic of Nigeria

United Nations membership
- Membership: Full member
- Since: 7 October 1960
- UNSC seat: Non-permanent
- Permanent Representative: Jimoh Ibrahim

Nigeria is a member of the United Nations. Nigeria did not become independent from the United Kingdom until 1960, while the United Nations had already been established by the Declaration by United Nations in 1942. Jimoh Ibrahim is the permanent representative of Nigeria.

In 2013, Nigeria contributed the fifth largest number of peacekeepers to United Nations peacekeeping operations. Nigeria has recently served a two-year term from 2014–2015 as a temporary member of the United Nations Security Council. The United Nations helped negotiate adjusting the border of Nigeria and Cameroon resulting in the Greentree Agreement in 2006.

== List of permanent representatives ==
#	Portrait	Name (birth–death)	Start	End	President/ Head of State
1		Jaja Wachuku (1918–1996)	7 October 1960	1961	Nnamdi Azikiwe
2		Muhammad Ngileruma (1908–1968)	1961	1962	Nnamdi Azikiwe
3		Simeon Adebo (1913–1994)	1962	1967	Nnamdi Azikwe Nwafor Orizu Johnson Aguiyi-Ironsi
4		Edwin Ogebe Ogbu (1926–1997)	1968	1975	Yakubu Gowon
5		Leslie O. Harriman (1930–1995)	1975	1979	Murtala Mohammed Olusegun Obasanjo
6		Yusuf Maitama Sule (1929–2017)	1979	1983	Shehu Shagari
7		Joseph Nanven Garba (1943–2002)	1984	1990	Muhammadu Buhari Ibrahim Babangida
8		Ibrahim Gambari (b. 1944)	1990	1999	Ibrahim Babangida Ernest Shonekan Sani Abacha Abdulsalami Abubakar
9		Arthur Christopher Mbanefo (b. 1930)	1999	2004	Olusegun Obasanjo Umaru Musa Yar'Adua
10		Aminu Bashir Wali (b. 1941)	2004	2007	Olusegun Obasanjo Umaru Musa Yar'Adua
11		Joy Angela Ogwu (1946–2025)	7 May 2008	3 May 2017	Umaru Musa Yar'Adua Goodluck Jonathan Muhammadu Buhari
12		Tijjani Muhammad-Bande (b. 1957)	3 May 2017	12 February 2024	Muhammadu Buhari Bola Tinubu
13		Samson Itegboje	12 February 2024	present	Bola Tinubu
14		Jimoh Ibrahim	Ambassador-designate		Bola Tinubu

== See also ==
- List of countries by number of UN peacekeepers
- List of members of the United Nations Security Council
