= Albright-Gambari Commission =

The Albright-Gambari Commission, formally known as the Commission on Global Security, Justice & Governance, is a commission that was formed by the Hague Institute for Global Justice and the Stimson Center to consider new frameworks for collective action on issues such as state fragility, climate change, and the cyber-economy. It was co-chaired by former Nigerian Foreign Minister and UN Under-Secretary-General Professor Ibrahim A. Gambari and former U.S. Secretary of State Madeleine Albright until her death in 2022.
