= Kenji Nagai =

Japanese journalist (1957–2007)

Kenji Nagai 長井 健司
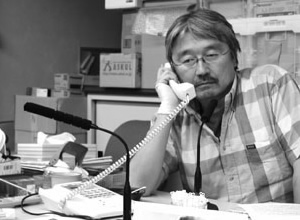
- Born: August 27, 1957; Imabari, Ehime, Japan
- Died: September 27, 2007 (aged 50); Yangon, Myanmar
- Cause of death: Gunshot wound
- Occupation: Photojournalist
- Known for: Being the only foreign national killed in the Saffron Revolution

Kenji Nagai (長井 健司, Nagai Kenji; August 27, 1957 – September 27, 2007) was a Japanese photojournalist who took many assignments to conflict zones and dangerous areas around the world.

He was shot dead in Myanmar during the Saffron Revolution while filming. Nagai continued to take photographs as he lay wounded on the ground, later dying from gunshot injuries to the chest. The government of Myanmar claimed that the cause of his death was a stray bullet; this was later disproven. Despite carrying his camera during a protest in the Saffron Revolution, it later went missing, supposedly because a Myanmar soldier had taken it. In 2023, the camera and footage were returned. He was the only foreign national killed in the protests.

== Background ==
Kenji Nagai grew up in Imabari, Ehime, Japan, and graduated from Imabari Nishi High School. Nagai attended Tokyo Keizai University (東京経済大学), and after graduation he studied abroad in the United States for a year. After his return to Japan, Nagai held a part-time job before embarking upon his career as a freelance journalist. Working as a contract photojournalist for Tokyo's AFP News, Nagai was accustomed to traveling to dangerous places in the Middle East. From 1997 until his death, Nagai took assignments in Afghanistan, Cambodia, the Palestinian territories, and Iraq, taking photographs that captured the essence of war.

Nagai arrived in Myanmar two days before the government began attacking Buddhist monks protesting against the military junta that has ruled the country since deposing the democratic government in a 1962 coup d'état. The protests originally began when the government raised the price of fuel, but grew into mass demonstrations in the tens of thousands, with Buddhist monks leading pro-democracy marches in the streets of Yangon. According to The Times, an associate of Nagai's said he was "relentless" when it came to covering a story, believing that he had to travel to "the places nobody wants to go".

== Death ==
Nagai had been in Myanmar covering the anti-government protests since Tuesday, September 25. On Thursday, September 27, Nagai was photographing the protests near the Traders Hotel, a few blocks away from the Sule Pagoda in downtown Yangon, when soldiers opened fire on demonstrators, killing Nagai and reportedly injuring another foreign journalist.

Reports initially stated that Nagai was hit by stray bullets fired by soldiers or possibly shot from the front. The "stray bullet" explanation was proposed by the government of Myanmar as an explanation for Nagai's death. However, video footage obtained by Japanese television appears to show a Burmese soldier shoving Nagai to the ground and shooting him at point-blank range. A still image photographed by Adrees Latif showed the soldier standing over Nagai, who was sprawled on the ground and still clutching his camera. This photograph appeared on the front page of The New York Times on September 28, 2007. A subsequent shot showed Nagai's body sprawled in the street as the soldier walked away. Judging from the patch, the soldier responsible is believed to be from one of the Light Infantry Divisions (possibly LID 66) in charge of crowd control in Yangon at the time of protests. At the Japanese embassy in Myanmar, a physician established the trajectory of the fatal bullet that killed Nagai, determining that the bullet entered Nagai's chest from the lower right side and pierced his heart before exiting from his back.

On October 8, new footage showing a Burmese soldier apparently confiscating a fallen Nagai's video camera was revealed on a Japanese news show. Adrees Latif's photograph, depicting Nagai sprawled on the pavement before his death, won the Pulitzer Prize for Breaking News Photography in 2008.

=== Response ===
Reporters Without Borders condemned the killing of Nagai, noting that Nagai was carrying a camera in his hand when he was shot, identifying him as a journalist. The director of the RWB's Washington, D.C. branch, Lucie Morillon, said that Nagai was "left to die in the street".

Japanese Prime Minister Yasuo Fukuda bemoaned Nagai's death as "extremely unfortunate" and Chief Cabinet Secretary Nobutaka Machimura offered his prayers and condolences. Machimura said: "We strongly protest the Myanmar government and demand an investigation (into the death). We demand (Myanmar) take appropriate steps to ensure the safety of the Japanese citizens in that country". Japan's Foreign Minister Masahiko Kōmura stated that Japan holds Myanmar accountable for the death of Kenji Nagai. According to Kōmura, U.S. Secretary of State Condoleezza Rice told him that the "international community cannot allow peaceful protesters to be killed and injured". On September 28, Masahiko Kōmura lodged a protest over the killing of Nagai when he met with Myanmar's Foreign Minister Nyan Win at the United Nations Headquarters. In the meeting, Nyan Win apologized for Nagai's death. Yabunaka Mitoji, Deputy Minister for Japanese Foreign Affairs, left for Myanmar on September 30.

Although Nyan Win officially apologized, an October 13 article locally published in the government-owned Mirror newspaper offered a different view of the events. It claimed that Nagai had entered the country using a tourist visa instead of proper journalist visa and faulted the cameraman for failing to get a permit to cover the news inside Myanmar. It emphasized that the event occurred at the time of martial law being imposed and the soldiers could not differentiate between a Burmese citizen and a Japanese because of the resemblance in Asian looks.

Nagai's father, Hideo, told the media: "I don't want Myanmar authorities and the government to resort to such measures. I want them to prevent something like this from happening again". According to Japan's Foreign minister Masahiko Komura, Japan is considered curbing development aid for Myanmar.

"The Group Protesting the Murder of Mr. Nagai by the Army of Myanmar" was founded by Japanese journalists, intellectuals, and celebrities in order to protest Nagai's killing and petition for the return of his camera and tape. By November 2007 the group collected 20,000 signatures, primarily in Japan. On November 26, 2007, the group posted an English version of the letter on their website and started collecting signatures internationally.

Sixteen years later, in 2023, Nagai's camera and footage was returned to his sister Noriko in Bangkok. Footage shows him reporting on the arrival of armed military at the protests, shortly before a soldier fatally shot him in the chest.

== Kenji Nagai Award ==
The Burma Media Association established an award in Nagai's memory. The award aims to recognize individuals who have reported the truth about Myanmar. The first award, in 2009, was presented to Eint Khaing Oo, a Burmese female journalist.

== See also ==
- International reaction to the 2007 Burmese anti-government protests
- Hiro Muramoto, cameraman and journalist shot by a soldier in Bangkok, 2010
- Lucas Dolega, photojournalist shot by police in Tunis, 2011
