= Nigerian Institute of International Affairs =

Professional association

The Nigerian Institute of International Affairs was established in 1961, to provide a platform of ideas on what direction Nigeria should follow on international policies, having regards to relationship with the outside world. The institute is headed by a Director-General, as of date in person of Prof. Eghosa Osaghae.

== Early history ==
The Nigerian Institute of International Affairs was established in 1961 but inaugurated in May 1963, with the support of the then prime minister of the Federation of Nigeria, Sir Abubakar Tafawa Balewa. The primary financial support for the Institute came from grants from the federal and regional governments of Nigeria with assistance from certain foreign governments and from the Ford Foundation of the United States and membership fees from both individuals and corporate members.

The institute was housed from 1963 to 1966 in a modest colonial-type house at Onikan, Lagos, but its permanent home moved to Kofo Abayomi Street in Victoria Island. It has a modern complex of buildings, which includes a 75-seat conference hall, equipped with simultaneous translating facilities, an auditorium accommodating 400, and a library wing for 100,000 volumes of books and journals, with an area for a press and pamphlet collection. A central four-floor headquarters building and a three-floor extension accommodates the administrative offices, research and conference rooms.

Olasupo Ojedokun, the second director-general, was credited with initiating a programme for the Institute of interdisciplinary research, symposia, and lectures, and the publication of monographs and surveys, with emphasis on African affairs.

== Categories of membership ==
NIIA membership is open to all members of the public who are university graduates. and there are four categories of membership: full and associate membership for graduates, professionals, scholars, government officials, life membership for Nigerians who has a previous membership of at least five years, and corporate membership for institutions and corporate bodies.

== Past directors-general ==
The founding director general of the institute was Dr Lawrence Apalara Fabunmi, a historian whose Ph.D. thesis from University of London on the Anglo-Egyptian condominium in the Sudan has remained a classic. He was succeeded by Dr Olasupo Aremu Ojedokun, a lecturer from University of Lagos, one of the first international relations doctorates from Nigeria, who wrote the seminal work, "The Changing Pattern of Nigeria's International Economic Relations: The Decline of the Colonial Nexus 1960-1966, Journal of Developing Areas 6, No 4 (July 1972): 546" and had a doctorate in 1968 from the London School of Economics. Dr. Ojedokun was described by Dr Abiodun Alao of King's College, London as a Nigerian expert on Anglo–Nigerian relations. Other directors-general have been Bolaji Akinyemi, Ibrahim Gambari, Gabriel Olusanya, George Obiozor, Joy Ogwu, Osita Eze, Bola A. Akinterinwa, PhD Sorbonne, fniia, inma, fssan, Bukar Bukarambe and Cyprian Heen as an interim director-general.

== See also ==
- L. A. Fabunmi
