= International reactions to the Saffron Revolution =

International reaction to the Saffron Revolution ranges from support of the protestors through neutrality to support of the State Peace and Development Council, the ruling junta. While most countries supported the protests and urged the Myanmar's State Peace and Development Council ruling military Junta to implement far-reaching reforms, several key countries, such as the People's Republic of China and India maintained commitment to the notion of noninterference. A number of protests against the Burmese Government's crackdown have been held worldwide.

== Africa ==
South Africa - Archbishop Emeritus Desmond Tutu on September 25, appealed to the United Nations and international community to press the Burmese government to release political detainees.

"The courage of the people of Burma is amazing and now they have been joined by their holy men," the Nobel peace laureate said in a statement. "It is so like the rolling mass action that eventually toppled apartheid," he said of the growing street protests in Myanmar. "We admire our brave sisters and brothers in Burma and want them to know that we support their peaceful protests to end a vicious rule of oppression and injustice."

== Asia ==
China - China is one of the closest allies and economic supporters of the ruling junta in Myanmar. In China's first official comment on the protests, Zhang Zhijun, a vice minister of the party's International Department, said Beijing has had minimal contact with either side and would abide by its long-term policy of noninterference in the domestic affairs of its allies. However, the Chinese government has quietly urged Myanmar's military rulers to ease the strife despite its stance that it would publicly stick to a hands-off approach toward its neighbor.

India - India, another important nation bordering Myanmar, was earlier reluctant to comment anything on the situation, although in a major boost to the ruling junta, India's oil ministry has decided to invest US$150 million in gas exploration in Myanmar. On 26 September, however, it broke its silence over the issue and said,

"Government is concerned at and is closely monitoring the situation in Myanmar... (and hopes) all sides will resolve their issues peacefully through dialogue."

An external affairs spokesman also added "India has believed that Myanmar's process of political reform and national reconciliation should be more inclusive and broad-based".

Indonesia - Indonesia's Permanent Representative to the United Nations, Marty Natalegawa, viewed the protests and crackdown in Myanmar (which is a member of ASEAN) with concern and called for restraint in part of the Burmese government:

"We are seriously following these developments very closely. We are concerned by it. We are calling on the authorities to exercise maximum restraint and desist from any acts that could cause further violence. Indonesia's approach has always been one of engagement, not necessarily meaning that we are less concerned about the situation therein. We are just convinced that the best way to go is through engagement and encouragement."

Japan - Japan has stated that it hopes that the government and the protesters can use dialog to bring peace.

"Japan strongly hopes that the Government of Myanmar will make sincere efforts including dialogue for national reconciliation and democratization, taking into account the wishes expressed in the protests by the people of Myanmar,"

said a statement of Japan Foreign Affairs.

South Korea - The Government of South Korea stated that they are strongly concerned about its situation, and urged the Government of Myanmar that "to exercise restraint in order to prevent the further aggravation of its situation", and hoped to both the Government and the people of Myanmar to build their democracy and development peacefully, by the spokesperson of the MOFAT. On September 28, 2007, Moon Guk-hyeon (Korean: 문국현), one of the pro-government candidates (currently 'independent') of the 2007 presidential election published their press release that the Government of Myanmar should not fight with their gun against democracy. Moreover, on September 27, a well-known civil organization called the People's Solidarity for Participatory Democracy (Korean: 참여연대) criticized the Burmese military regime, due to their pressure on the peaceful demands of Burma's democracy.

Laos - Though the Lao government has not released any statements, Gen Than Shwe's family members, including an associate, landed in Vientiane on the 27th.

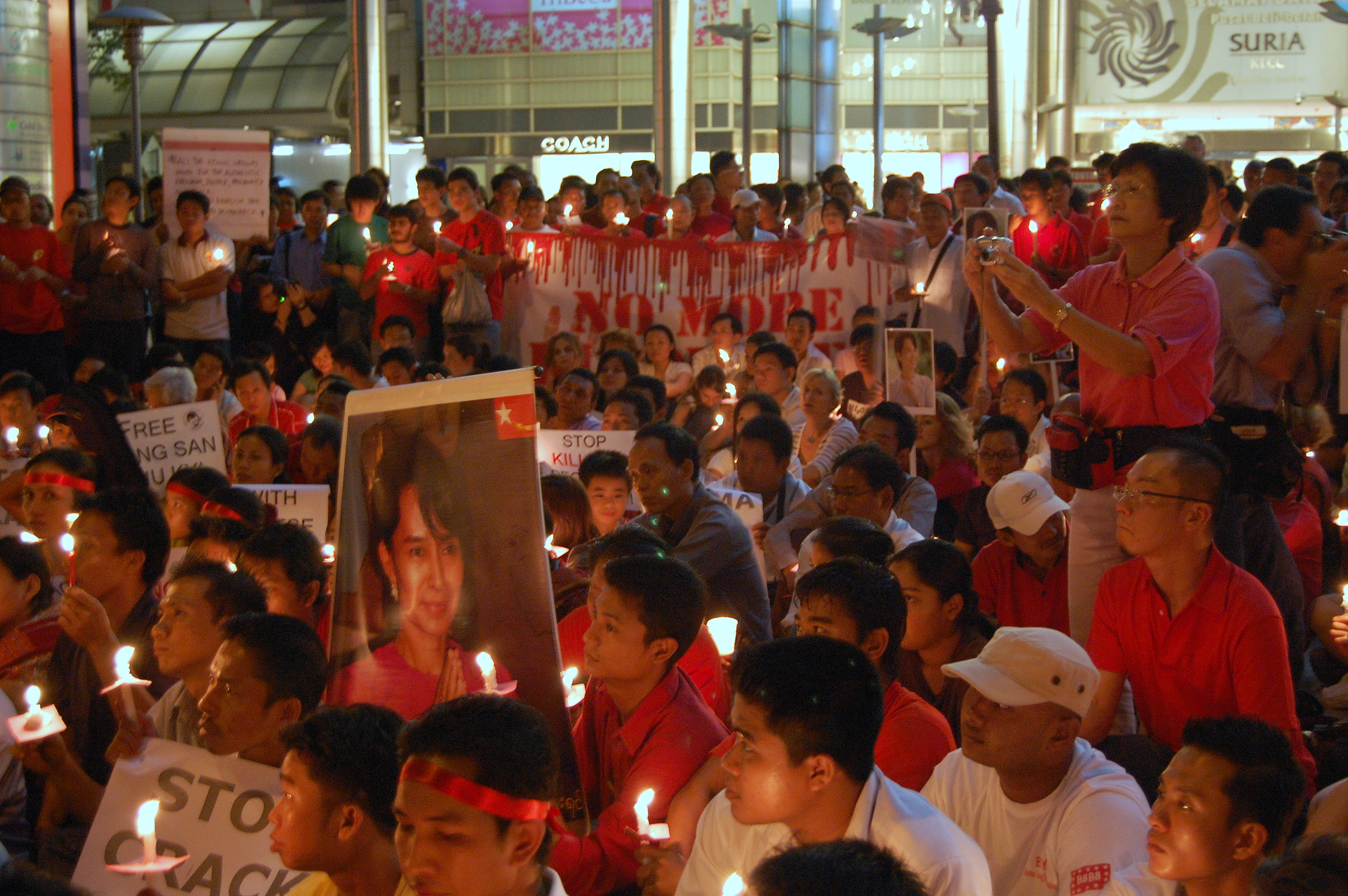
Vigil at the base of the Petronas Twin Towers, Kuala Lumpur.

Malaysia - On September 26, Foreign Minister Datuk Seri Syed Hamid Albar expressed his worry on the effects of the unrest in Myanmar, stating the Burmese junta's failure to diligently move towards democratisation would be seen as an embarrassment to ASEAN due to the pact's perceived inability to address Myanmar's problems.

Also commented by the Foreign Minister was the use of economic sanctions against Myanmar, which was viewed as being more likely to affect ordinary citizens more than the targeted group. Soe Win, the News and Periodicals Enterprise Managing Director and head of Myanmar's information agency, lauded Malaysia's stand on the issue of sanctions, adding:

"Most of the Western media fabricate news about Myanmar, getting information from undesirable elements".

On September 28, Prime Minister Datuk Seri Abdullah Ahmad Badawi stood up to voice his view that ASEAN's constructive engagement with the Burmese junta has failed, as Myanmar does not occasionally appear to push for democratisation and fails to abide by ASEAN's demands:

"It has been the formula used when we deal with Myanmar but up to this stage, it has not been successful although it has been many years already".

The Prime Minister also reiterated support for the dispatch of Ibrahim Gambari to Myanmar by the UN, stating ASEAN was giving its full backing.

On the same day, about 3,000 refugees, migrant workers and activists staged a march towards the Burmese embassy in Kuala Lumpur and handed a memorandum to minister-counsellor Win Myint, urging the junta to resolve the unrest in Myanmar. The protest was led by All Burma Democratic Force, followed by a range of other human rights organisations. Another round of peaceful demonstration was held by 2,000 Myanmars affront the Burmese embassy (alongside the Russian and Chinese embassies) on the morning of October 4.

Philippines - President Gloria Macapagal Arroyo called on Myanmar to take steps for democracy, called again to release Aung San Suu Kyi and asked the junta to invite UN Special Envoy Ibrahim Gambari to Myanmar.

Singapore - Singapore, currently holding the chair of ASEAN, released a statement in a bid to encourage a peaceful resolution to the Burmese events, mentioning that "Singapore is concerned over the latest developments in Myanmar and is monitoring the situation closely,"

On September 27, the Ministry of Foreign Affairs stated that:

"Singapore is deeply troubled and concerned by reports that the demonstrations in Yangon have been suppressed by force. We urge the Myanmar authorities to exercise utmost restraint."

Singapore also supported the UN's decision to send Ibrahim Gambari to Myanmar.

Taiwan - The President of the Republic of China (Taiwan), Chen Shui-bian expressed, on behalf of the Taiwanese Government, he conveys the strongest denunciation and regret to such violences of anti-democracy, anti-human rights, anti-humanity of Burmese Government, and appeals to the global democratic community to bring active interposition to Myanmar, so that bring liberty, democracy and peace to Burmese people afresh as soon as possible. He also urges the international society to square up to the entity of autarchy of the People's Republic China, to her bad record of human rights, and also, to pay close attention to her military intimidation, diplomatic repression and political wars of consolidation to Taiwan.

On October 6, more than 100 Burmese and Taiwanese people marched in Taipei City to support the ongoing demonstrations in Burma. "Free Burma! Free Aung San Suu Kyi!" they shouted.

Thailand - Prime Minister Surayud Chulanont issued his statement against the Burmese government's decision to use force against protesters, sharing his views as a Buddhist and a former military official on the effects of any crackdown:

"I'm trying my best to convince the Burmese: 'Don't use the harsh measures.' At the least they should try to avoid the violent action from the government side.As a Buddhist and as a soldier, I can say that it will be very difficult for the Burmese government to use violence to crack down on the monks. It will be against the way of life of the Buddhists."

Vietnam - The topic was slow to make the headline in Vietnam until September 25, when a few news outlet began publishing terse accounts.

== Europe ==
France - The French government warned Myanmar's ruling junta on September 24, that it would be held accountable if it cracked down on protesters who have taken to the streets in large numbers in Yangon.President Nicolas Sarkozy requested on September 26 that French businesses freeze investments in Myanmar and he called for the UN Security Council to have 'sanctions to be adopted without delay.'

Switzerland - Swiss President Micheline Calmy-Rey spoke at the opening of the UN's 62nd General Assembly and addressed the use of force by Burma's military junta against pro-democracy demonstrators calling the situation "alarming". Calmy-Rey went on by adding that Switzerland favoured a dialogue, among all parties involved, under leadership of the UN secretary-general's special envoy to Burma, Ibrahim Gambari.

Germany - Foreign Ministry spokesman, Martin Jaeger, expressed his sympathy towards the demonstrators, saying:

"We, along with the Portuguese presidency of the European Union, urge the release of those recently detained during the protests."

Ireland - The Irish Foreign Minister, Dermot Ahern, stated that:

"We have all been struck by the dignity and courage of the protests by thousands of Buddhist monks and tens of thousands of ordinary people in cities across the country, and their appeal for national reconciliation, genuine democracy and improved living conditions."

"The Burmese authorities must fulfil their promises of reconciliation and democratisation, which the 14-year-long National Convention has singularly failed to deliver. The authorities must engage democratically with the democratic opposition and ethnic groups in open and inclusive dialogue. The world needs to speak with one voice in ensuring restraint on the part of the Burmese regime in dealing with the peaceful protests.”

Ahern also then stated that the European Union should impose more sanctions against Myanmar's military regime:

"Within the European Union, Ireland has long taken a strong and principled position on Burma. We are looking urgently at how to increase the pressure on the regime, including through further EU restrictive measures, without harming the ordinary people whose suffering is already so great."

Netherlands - Dutch Prime Minister Jan-Peter Balkenende has called for sanctions against Myanmar.

"In Myanmar, soldiers opened fire on monks and civilians taking part in peaceful demonstrations. We strongly condemn this brutal violence." Also, he asked the United Nations Security Council to meet once again. "If the Security Council does not reach an agreement, we will take our own responsibility. In that case, I am convinced that the European Union and the United States will decide on further measures, together with other benevolent countries."

In accordance, several sanctions are being considered by the Dutch government, including a possible ban on wood from Myanmar. Also, the Prime Minister remarked that these sanctions should target only the military junta, but not impair the population.

Norway - Norwegian Prime Minister Jens Stoltenberg and Foreign Minister Jonas Gahr Støre both condemned the use of violence by the military junta, and urged the international community to take responsibility for the democratic development in Myanmar. Jens Stoltenberg stated that:

"The use of force is the last thing Burma needs right now. That's a message we're sending very clearly from the Norwegian government."

"We believe that the countries in the immediate area have a special responsibility. That applies, not least, to China."

Poland - Polish democracy leader Lech Wałęsa and a former Communist Polish political and military leader Wojciech Jaruzelski made a unique joint appeal to Myanmar's junta on Thursday to talk to protesters.

"In Myanmar, as in Poland, only a bloodless transition to democracy is in the interest of all."

Sweden - On September 23, foreign minister Carl Bildt said in a statement that:

"(Sweden) demands that the regime fully respects the right to peaceful protests" ... "We—and the European Union—want to open up for cooperation and trade with a democratic Burma".

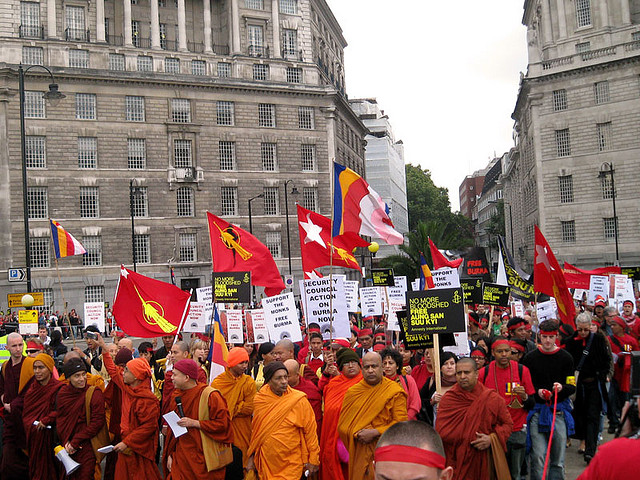
Protesters march in London

United Kingdom - The UK Ambassador, Mark Canning, commented that the Burmese leaders were now in uncharted territory, and was concerned about any possible crackdown by the junta, saying:

"That would be a disaster, although in terms of probability, I'm afraid, ranks quite high."

Mike Ellam, Prime Minister Gordon Brown's spokesman, stated that:

"[HM Government] deplore(s) the continued repression of ordinary citizens by the Burmese regime and we were deeply concerned by reports of further acts of violence perpetrated this week by security officials against peaceful demonstrators."

Foreign Secretary David Miliband, at the Labour Party Conferences in Bournemouth, responded to events by saying:

"I for one thought it was brilliant to see Aung San Suu Kyi alive and well outside her house last week. I think it will be a hundred times better when she takes her rightful place as the elected leader of a free and democratic Burma."

Vatican City - Pope Benedict XVI stated that he wishes for a peaceful solution to the "extremely serious" events in Myanmar, and expressed sorrow for the poor residents of the country during its "painful trial".

== North America ==
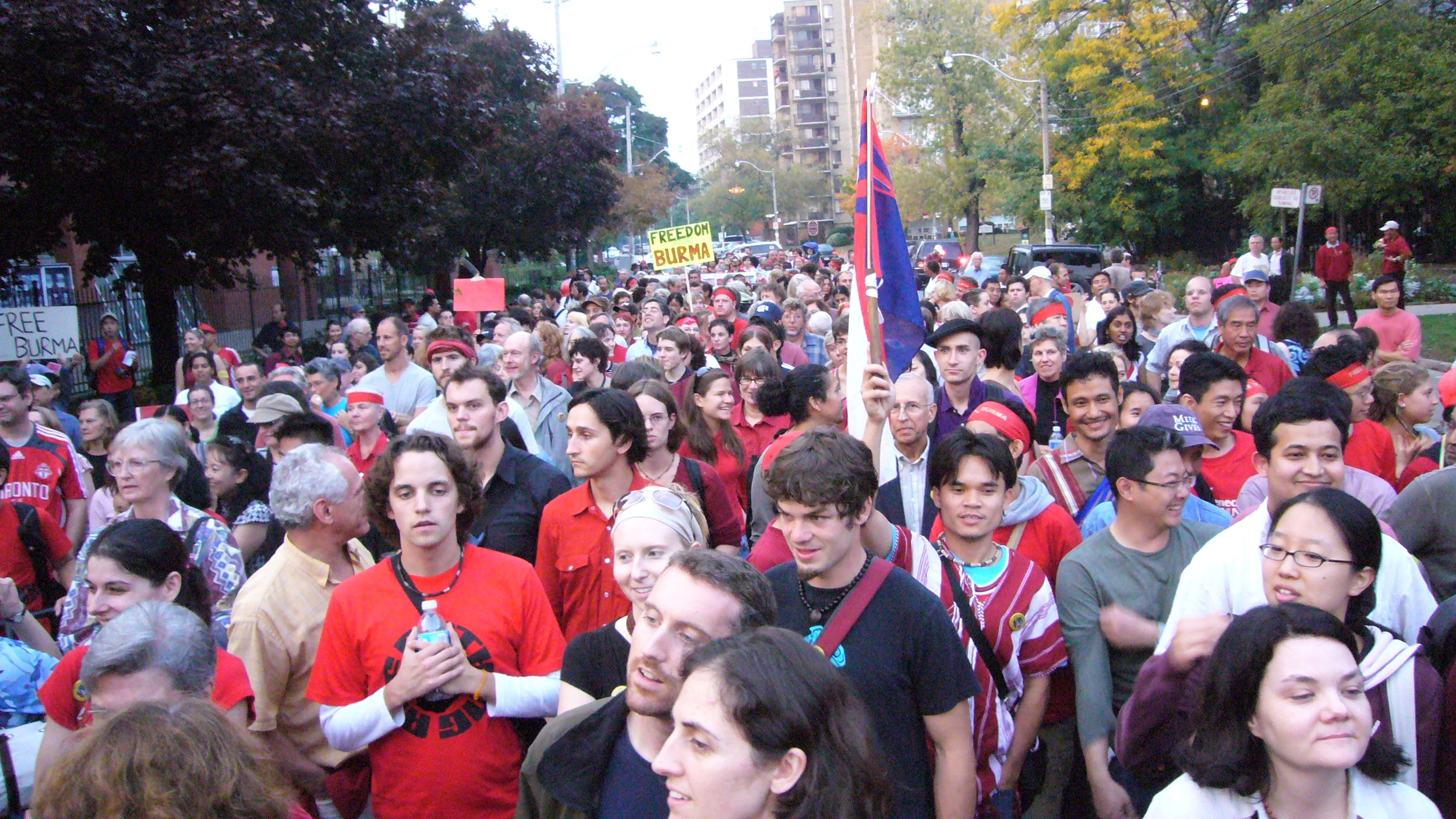
Protest march Toronto, Canada.

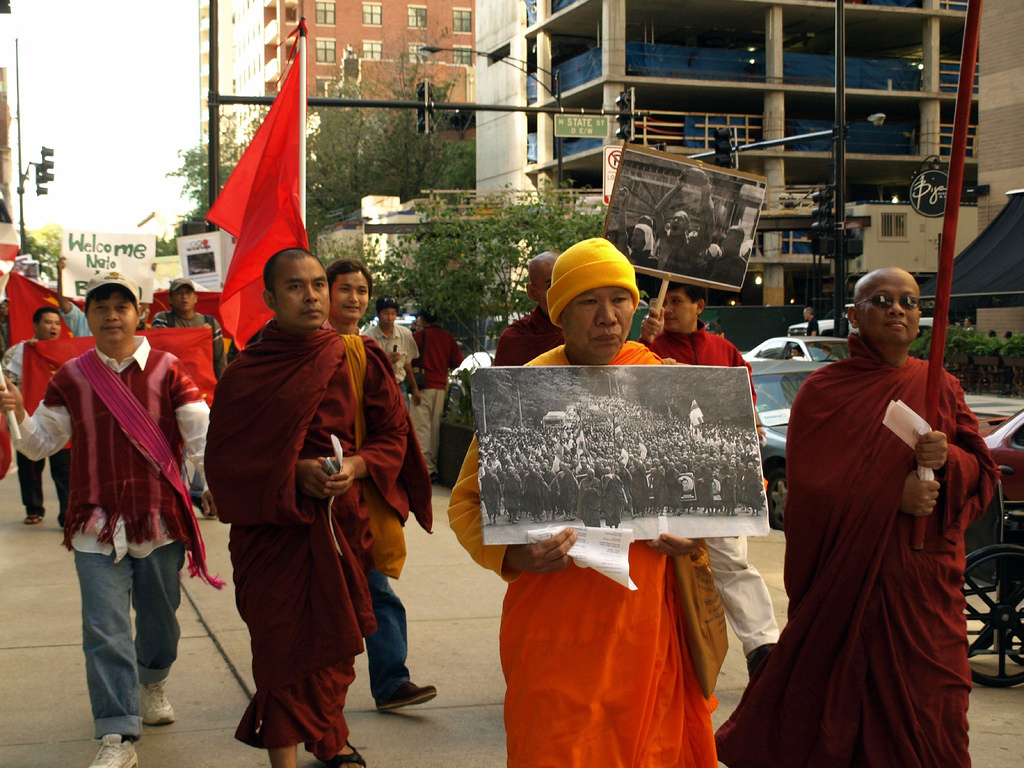
Protest march to Chinese embassy in Chicago.

Canada - The Government of Canada has demanded that Burmese leaders meet with the protesters.

On September 26, Foreign Affairs Minister Maxime Bernier issued a statement that "Canada condemns the use of deadly force by the military and police against the monks and other protesters in Burma who were expressing their right to peaceful dissent, and calls on Burma to put an immediate end to such violence."

United States - President George W. Bush, on September 25, announced new sanctions against "the leaders of the regime and its financial backers", accusing the military dictatorship in Myanmar of imposing "a 19-year reign of fear" that denies basic freedoms of speech, assembly and worship.

"Americans are outraged by the situation in Burma," the president said in an address to the U.N. General Assembly.

Additionally, various college campuses ran campaigns in solidarity with anti-government protestors.

== Oceania ==
Australia - The Australian Foreign Minister Alexander Downer has told reporters that:

"I hope the international community will use this, as Australia does, as an opportunity to express our heartfelt support for the people of Burma who want to see reform there, but also to send a very strong message to the military leaders in Burma that some hardline crackdown like we saw in the 1980s, in 1988, would be completely unacceptable to the international community."

On September 27, there were protests in major cities across Australia, supporting the rights of Burmese to democracy and peaceful protest.

Also on September 27, Alexander Downer said there was little the United Nations could do after the Security Council's call for restraint, adding:

"The very fact of the Security Council addressing the issue of Burma is important because it helps to provide momentum for international support for reform in Burma and this opportunity has to be used for that."

== South America ==
Chile - The Chilean Ministry of Foreign Relations, on September 25, expressed concern and absolutely rejected any action that would prevent the free exercise of basic human rights and called for the government of Myanmar to avoid the use of violence as well as free political prisoners as a gesture of good will to the international community. On September 28, the Chilean Ministry of Foreign Affairs condemned the violence against protesters and called for the international community to make maximum efforts to contribute to the end of the current situation.
