= Jimoh Ibrahim =

Nigerian politician, lawyer and businessman (born 1967)

Permanent Representative of Nigeria to the United Nations
- Incumbent
- Assumed office April 21, 2026
- Appointed by: Bola Ahmed Tinubu

Senator for Ondo South
- In office 13 June 2023 – 23 December 2025
- Preceded by: Nicholas Tofowomo

Personal details
- Born: 24 February 1967 (age 59)
- Party: All Progressives Congress
- Education: Obafemi Awolowo University (LLB, MPA); Harvard University (LLM/IT); Cambridge University (DBA)
- Occupation: Politician; lawyer; businessman

Jimoh Ibrahim CFR (born 24 February 1967) is a Nigerian politician, businessman and philanthropist who is the ambassador of Nigeria to the United Nations. He was a senator representing Ondo south Senatorial district from 2023 to 2025.

He is the chairman and chief executive officer of Global Fleet Group, a diversified conglomerate based in Nigeria, with business interests and subsidiaries in neighboring West African countries.

== Background and early life ==
Ibrahim traces his origins to Ondo State, in southwestern Nigeria. He studied law at Obafemi Awolowo University in Ile Ife, Osun State, Nigeria, graduating with the degree of Bachelor of Laws (LLB). Subsequently, he obtained the degree of Master of Public Administration (MPA), also from Obafemi Awolowo University. Later, he attended Harvard University in Cambridge, Massachusetts, US, graduating with a combined Master of Laws (LLM) and Master's In International Taxation degree. Ibrahim became the first individual to receive a Doctor of Business Administration (DBA) from the University of Cambridge, graduating in July 2022 from Churchill College.

His investments include the following sectors, among others: oil & gas distribution, hotels, resorts, airlines, banking, real estate, insurance, publishing and investments.

== Business interests ==
Global Fleet Group has the following subsidiary companies, among others:

1. Air Nigeria - Lagos, Nigeria - Formerly Virgin Nigeria
2. NICON Insurance - Lagos, Nigeria
3. Nigeria Reinsurance Corporation - Lagos, Nigeria
4. NICON Luxury Hotel - Abuja, Nigeria - Formerly Le' Meridien Hotel
5. Global Fleet Oil & Gas - A chain of gasoline stations (estimated at about 200 in 2011), across Nigeria
6. The NICON Group - Lagos, Nigeria - Holdings include investment companies, schools, real estate holdings, transport companies and others
7. Global Fleet Building - Lagos, Nigeria - Formerly Allied Bank Building
8. Meidan Hotel - Lagos, Nigeria
9. Global Fleet Industries - Lagos, Nigeria - Formerly HFP Industries Limited
10. Energy Bank - Accra, Ghana - A new commercial bank in Ghana, started operations in February 2011
11. Oceanic Bank São Tomé - São Tomé, São Tomé and Príncipe - Commercial bank purchased from Oceanic Bank in May 2011.
12. Newswatch Magazine - Lagos, Nigeria

== Other responsibilities ==
In 2003, Jimoh Ibrahim mounted an unsuccessful bid to become the governor of Ondo State, on the All Nigeria People's Party (ANPP) ticket. He has authored three books. He is married to Mrs Modupe Jimoh Ibrahim and is the father of four children. He is also the publisher of the National Mirror Newspaper in Nigeria.

== Controversy ==
Sahara Reports published a number of articles making allegations of substantial misconduct during 2013–15.

On Wednesday 11 November 2020, it was reported that the Asset Management Corporation of Nigeria (AMCON) had obtained a court order to freeze bank accounts and seize assets belonging to Jimoh Ibrahim over unpaid NGN69.4 billion debts.

== See also ==
- Global Fleet Group
- Air Nigeria
- Energy Bank
