= Oceanic Bank =

Defunct Nigerian bank

Oceanic Bank International Plc.
- Type: Public limited company
- Industry: Finance
- Founded: March 26, 1990 (acquired by Ecobank in 2011 )
- Founder: Ibru Family
- Headquarters: Herbert Macaulay Way, Wuse Zone 6, Abuja, FCT, Nigeria
- Key people: Hayford Kponmwonsa Alile, Chairman; John Aboh, Managing Director & CEO
- Revenue: ▲ ₦188.2billion (2008)
- Total assets: ₦1.3 trillion
- Website: Website shut down after closure

Oceanic Bank International, commonly referred to as Oceanic Bank, was a bank in Nigeria that provided individual, commercial and corporate banking services. It was one of the top 5 leading banks in Nigeria.

== History ==
Oceanic Bank was incorporated on March 26, 1990, as a private limited liability company with 100% equity ownership by Nigerian citizens, and licensed on April 10, 1990, to carry on commercial banking. The bank commenced business on June 12, 1990, at the Waterfront Plaza, Plot 270, Ozumba Mbadiwe Avenue, Victoria Island, Lagos. It was listed on the Nigerian Stock Exchange on June 25, 2004. In October 2010, Cecilia Ibru, the former head of Oceanic Bank, was sentenced to eighteen months and ordered to forfeit over US$1 billion for fraud.

Following the sentencing of Mrs Ibru after she pleaded guilty to three-count charge bordering on negligence, reckless grant of credit facilities and mismanagement of depositors’ funds, the Bank was put into administration and subsequently acquired in 2011 by a rival bank, Ecobank. In June 2014, Mrs Ibru filed a motion at the Abuja Federal High Court asking the court to reverse the acquisition of Oceanic Bank.

== Global presence ==
As of May 2009, Oceanic Bank had subsidiaries in the following countries:

- Cameroon
- (The Gambia) Gambia – This subsidiary was closed in January 2011.
- Ghana
- Nigeria
- São Tomé and Príncipe – Sold to Global Fleet Group in May 2011.

== Subsidiaries ==
The bank had the following subsidiary companies:

- Oceanic Registrars Limited – Lagos, Nigeria
- Oceanic Trustees Limited – Lagos, Nigeria
- Oceanic Custodian Limited – Lagos, Nigeria
- Oceanic Insurance Limited – Lagos, Nigeria
- Oceanic Homes Limited – Lagos, Nigeria
- Oceanic Securities Limited – Lagos, Nigeria
- Oceanic Asset Management Limited – Lagos, Nigeria
