= National Insurance Corporation of Nigeria =

Nigerian insurance company

NICON Insurance Limited, originally established as the National Insurance Corporation of Nigeria (NICON or NICON Insurance) was a Nigerian insurance company owned by the Federal Government of Nigeria from its establishment in 1969 till it was privatized in 2005.

== History ==
NICON Insurance was the biggest insurance in Nigeria prior to its privatization under the Olusegun Obasanjo administration. NICON Insurance was privatised in 2005 as part of Nigeria’s broader economic reform and privatisation programme under the Bureau of Public Enterprises. A core investor group led by businessman Jimoh Ibrahim acquired a 70% equity stake in the company, while the Federal Government of Nigeria retained a 30% shareholding.

== Takeover ==
In July 2021, the Asset Management Corporation of Nigeria (AMCON) took over the major interests in NICON Insurance Limited and the Nigeria Reinsurance Corporation (Nigeria Re) from Jimoh Ibrahim, over a N69.4 billion debt.

NICON is now being restructured to focused on debt resolution, improved governance, and adherence to regulatory standards. NICON Insurance still owes billions of Naira in unpaid claims.

== See also ==
- AIICO Insurance Plc
