= Joy Ogwu =

Nigerian politician and diplomat (1946–2025)

Permanent Representative of Nigeria to the United Nations
- In office 7 May 2008 – May 2017
- Succeeded by: Tijjani Muhammad-Bande

Foreign Minister of Nigeria
- In office 30 August 2006 – 29 May 2007
- President: Olusegun Obasanjo
- Preceded by: Ngozi Okonjo-Iweala
- Succeeded by: Ojo Maduekwe

Personal details
- Born: Joy Uche Angela Ogwu; 22 August 1946 Nigeria Protectorate
- Died: 13 October 2025 (aged 79) New York, U.S.
- Education: Rutgers University; University of Lagos

Joy Uche Angela Ogwu (22 August 1946 – 13 October 2025) was a Nigerian politician and diplomat who served as foreign minister and as permanent representative of Nigeria to the United Nations (2008–2017).

Ogwu was the first woman to hold the post of permanent representative to the United Nations from Nigeria. Prior to her ministerial career, she served as director–general of the Nigerian Institute of International Affairs (NIIA).

She advised the United Nations Institute for Disarmament Research on disarmament issues and published books promoting more African ties to Latin America. She was a chair of the board of trustees of the United Nations Institute for Disarmament Research (UNIDIR).

Ogwu was appointed foreign minister by Nigerian President Olusegun Obasanjo on 30 August 2006.

In 2008, Ogwu became the permanent representative of Nigeria to the UN in New York City. She was the president of the UN Security Council in July 2010 and in October 2011. She was the president of the executive board of the UN Women Entity for Gender Equality and the Empowerment of Women.

She obtained her BA and MA in political science from Rutgers University. She later received her Ph.D. from the University of Lagos in Nigeria. While obtaining her Ph.D. in 1977, she joined the Institute of International Affairs at the University of Lagos.

Ogwu started her career as an assistant lecturer, at the Nigerian National War College and the National Institute of Policy and Strategic Studies (NIPSS). She subsequently joined the NIIA as a lecturer, obtaining a research fellowship during which she authored her first book, Nigerian Foreign Policy: Alternative Futures (Macmillan, 1986).

She eventually headed the research department in International Politics, leading to her role as the first female director general. Ogwu additionally focused on the developing countries of Latin America, enabling an investigation into the possibilities of a proficient South-South relationship between Sub-Saharan Africa and Latin America. She held a visiting fellowship at the University of London's Institute of Latin American Studies and was published extensively in Portuguese, Spanish, French and Croatian. She served on the United Nations Secretary General's advisory board on Disarmament Matters.

She became a voice for women's development and human rights. Her perspective spanned Asia Pacific, Latin America and Sub-Saharan Africa.

Ogwu died at a hospital in New York, on 13 October 2025, at the age of 79.

== Published books ==
- Nigerian Foreign Policy: Alternative Futures, published by the Nigerian Institute of International Affairs in co-operation with Macmillan Nigeria Publishers, 1986
- Africa and Latin America: Perspectives and Challenges
- New Horizons for Nigeria in World Affairs, 2005
- Leadership, Democracy, and the Challenges of Development, 2017

Political offices
Preceded by Ngozi Okonjo-Iweala	Foreign Minister of Nigeria; 30 August 2006 – 29 May 2007	Succeeded by Ojo Maduekwe
