= Thamada Cinema =

- သမ္မတ ရုပ်ရှင်ရုံ
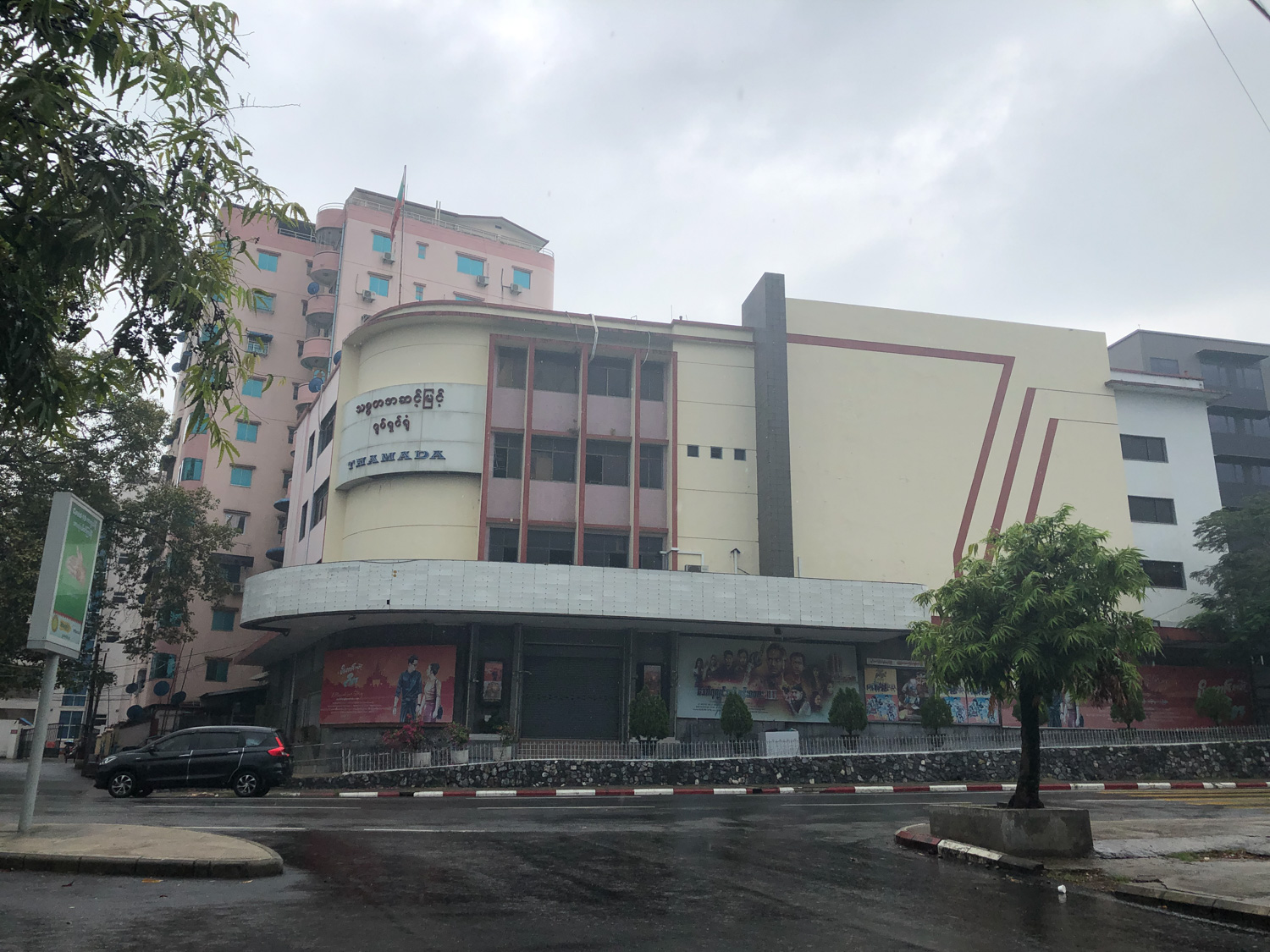
- Thamada Cinema in 2021

- Location within Myanmar
- Former names: President Cinema

General information
- Status: Active
- Type: Cinema
- Architectural style: Modernist
- Location: 5 Alanpya Pagoda Road, Dagon Township, Yangon, Myanmar
- Coordinates: 16.7867°N 96.1555°E
- Construction started: 1956
- Completed: 1964
- Opened: 1964

Technical details
- Material: Reinforced concrete
- Floor count: 4

Design and construction
- Architect: Unknown
- Known for: Oval-shaped auditorium; modernist architecture

Thamada Cinema (Burmese: သမ္မတရုပ်ရှင်ရုံ), also known as the President Cinema, is a historic mid-century modernist movie theater in Dagon Township, Yangon, Myanmar.

U Kyauk Sein, a businessman of Chinese descent, constructed the hotel and cinema between 1956 and 1964. The cinema began operating in 1958.

Operated by the government, Thamada Cinema is among Myanmar's biggest cinemas.

== See also ==
- Architecture of Myanmar
- Cinema of Myanmar
- Yangon Heritage Trust
- History of Yangon
