= Ibrahim Gambari =

Nigerian academic and diplomat (born 1944)

Ibrahim Gambari CFR
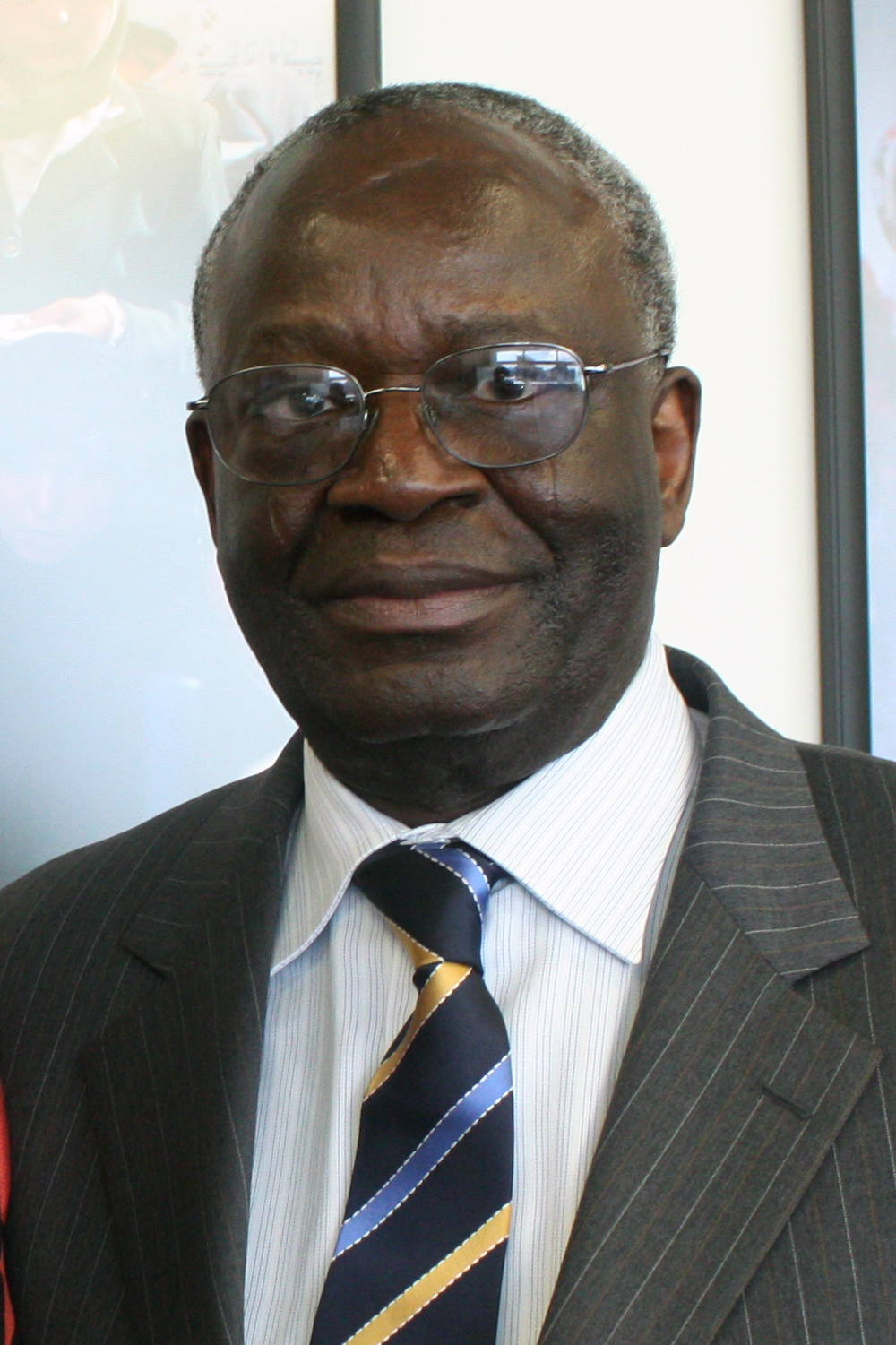

Chief of Staff to the President
- In office 13 May 2020 – 29 May 2023
- President: Muhammadu Buhari
- Deputy: Ade Ipaye (Office of the Vice President)
- Preceded by: Abba Kyari
- Succeeded by: Femi Gbajabiamila

Under Secretary-General of the United Nations for Political Affairs
- In office 2005–2007
- Secretary-General: Kofi Annan; Ban Ki-moon

Under Secretary-General of the United Nations (Special Adviser on Africa)
- In office 1999–2005
- Secretary-General: Kofi Annan
- Preceded by: Position established

President of UNICEF
- In office 1999–1999
- Preceded by: Michael Powles
- Succeeded by: Anwarul Karim Chowdhury

Permanent Representative of Nigeria to the United Nations
- In office 1990–1999
- President: Ibrahim Badamasi Babangida; Ernest Shonekan; Sani Abacha; Abdulsalami Abubakar; Olusegun Obasanjo
- Preceded by: Joseph Nanven Garba
- Succeeded by: Arthur Mbanefo

Minister of External Affairs
- In office 1984–1985
- Head of State: Muhammadu Buhari
- Preceded by: Emeka Anyaoku
- Succeeded by: Bolaji Akinyemi

Personal details
- Born: 24 November 1944 (age 81) Ilorin, Northern Region, British Nigeria (now in Kwara State, Nigeria)
- Party: All Progressives Congress (APC)
- Relatives: Ibrahim Sulu-Gambari (nephew)
- Education: London School of Economics (B.Sc.); Columbia University (M.A. & Ph.D.)
- Alma mater: Kings College, Lagos
- Occupation: Diplomat; academic

Ibrahim Agboola Gambari, CFR (born 24 November 1944), is a Nigerian academic and diplomat who served as Chief of Staff to the President of Nigeria from 2020 to 2023.

He previously served as permanent representative of Nigeria to the United Nations from 1990 to 1999, and minister of external affairs from 1984 to 1985.

== Early life and education ==
Ibrahim Agboola Gambari was born on 24 November 1944 in Ilorin, Kwara State to a Fulani ruling class family. His nephew Ibrahim Sulu Gambari is the Emir of Ilorin.

Gambari attended King's College, Lagos. He subsequently attended the London School of Economics where he obtained his B. Sc. (Economics) degree (1968) with specialisation in International Relations. He later obtained his M.A. (1970) and Ph. D. (1974) degrees from Columbia University, New York, United States in Political Science /International Relations.

== Academic career ==
Gambari began his teaching career in 1969 at City University of New York before working at University of Albany. Later, he taught at Ahmadu Bello University, in Zaria, Kaduna State. From 1986 to 1989, he was Visiting Professor at three universities in Washington, D.C.: Johns Hopkins School of Advanced International Studies, Georgetown University and Howard University. He has also been a research fellow at the Brookings Institution also in Washington, D.C. and a Resident Scholar at the Bellagio Study and Conference Center, the Rockefeller Foundation-run center in Italy. He has written so many books and published in reputable journals in foreign policy and international relations, such as 'Theory and Reality in Foreign Policy: Nigeria after second Republic'.

== Foreign policy ==
=== Nigeria ===
Gambari served as the Minister for External Affairs between 1984 and 1985 under General Muhammadu Buhari's military regime, after he was the director general of The Nigerian Institute of International Affairs (NIIA). From 1990 to 1999, he holds the record of being the longest serving Nigerian Ambassador to the United Nations, serving under five Heads of State and Presidents.

=== United Nations ===
Gambari has held several positions in the United Nations. In 1999, he was the President of UNICEF and later became UN Under Secretary-General and the first Special Adviser on Africa to the UN Secretary General Kofi Annan from 1999 to 2005. He was the Under-Secretary-General of the United Nations for Political Affairs from 2005 to 2007 under Secretary-General's Kofi Annan and Ban Ki-moon. His last appointment in the UN was from January 2010 to July 2012, when he was appointed by Ban Ki-moon and the Chairperson of the African Union Commission as the Joint African Union-United Nations Special Representative for Darfur.

== Honours and memberships ==
- Founder and Chairman of the Savannah Centre
- Gambari is the co-chair of the Albright-Gambari Commission
- He is a member of the Johns Hopkins University's Society of Scholars
- He was decorated with the title of Commander of the Federal Republic (CFR) by the Government of Nigeria
- He was accorded, honoris causa, the title of Doctor of Humane Letters (D.Hum.Litt.) from the University of Bridgeport
- On 4 March 2013, Gambari was named by the Governor of Kwara Abdulfatah Ahmad, as the Chancellor of the Kwara State University

Political offices
Preceded by Emeka Anyaoku	Foreign Minister of Nigeria; 1984 – 1985	Succeeded by Bolaji Akinyemi
Preceded by Abba Kyari	Chief of Staff to the President; 2020 – 2023	Succeeded by Femi Gbajabiamila
Diplomatic posts
Preceded by Joseph Nanven Garba	Permanent Representative of Nigeria to the United Nations; 1990 – 1999	Succeeded by Chief Arthur Mbanefo
Preceded by Joseph Nanven Garba	Chairman of the United Nations Special Committee on Peacekeeping Operations; 1990 – 1999	Succeeded by Chief Arthur Mbanefo
Preceded by ?	President of the Executive Board of UNICEF; 1999	Succeeded by ?
Preceded by Nil	Under-Secretary-General of the United Nations; Special Adviser on Africa; 2000 – 2005	Succeeded by Legwaila Joseph Legwaila
Preceded by Sir Kieran Prendergast (UK)	Under-Secretary-General of the United Nations for Department of Political Affairs; 2005 – 2007	Succeeded by B. Lynn Pascoe
