= Air Nigeria =

National airline of Nigeria (2005–2012)

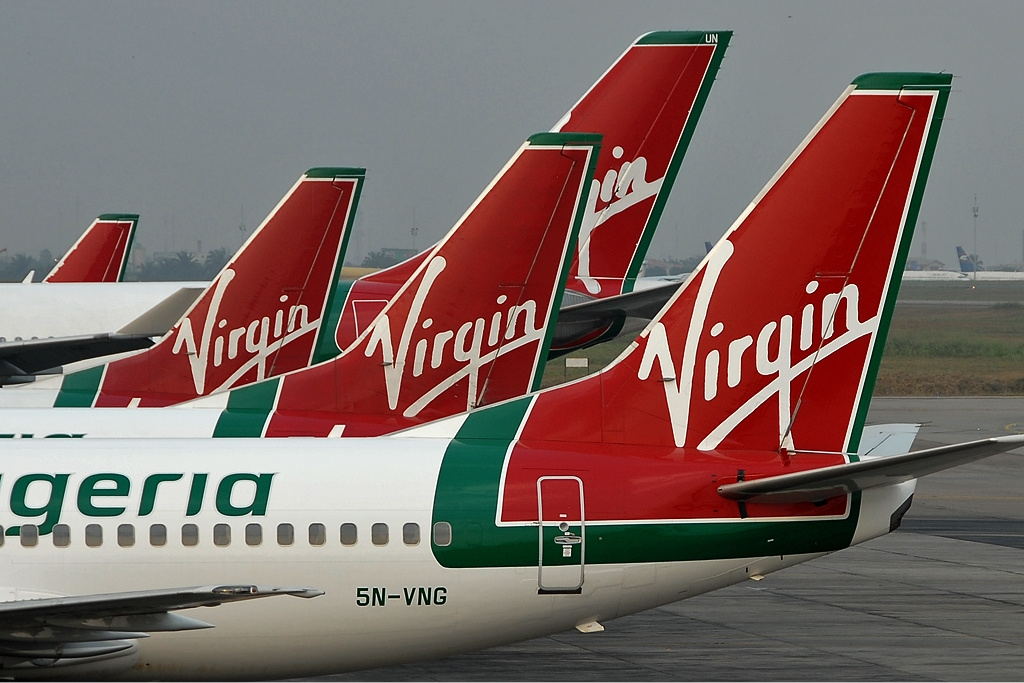
- Virgin Nigeria fleet
IATA	ICAO	Call sign
VK	ANP	NICON FLIERS
- Founded: 2004 (as Virgin Nigeria)
- Commenced operations: 28 June 2005
- Ceased operations: 10 September 2012
- Operating bases: Murtala Muhammed International Airport
- Frequent-flyer program: Eagleflier
- Fleet size: 12
- Destinations: 19
- Headquarters: Ikeja, Lagos State, Nigeria
- Key people: Jimoh Ibrahim, chairman; Kinfe Kahssay, CEO; Olisakwe livinus

Virgin Nigeria's logo.

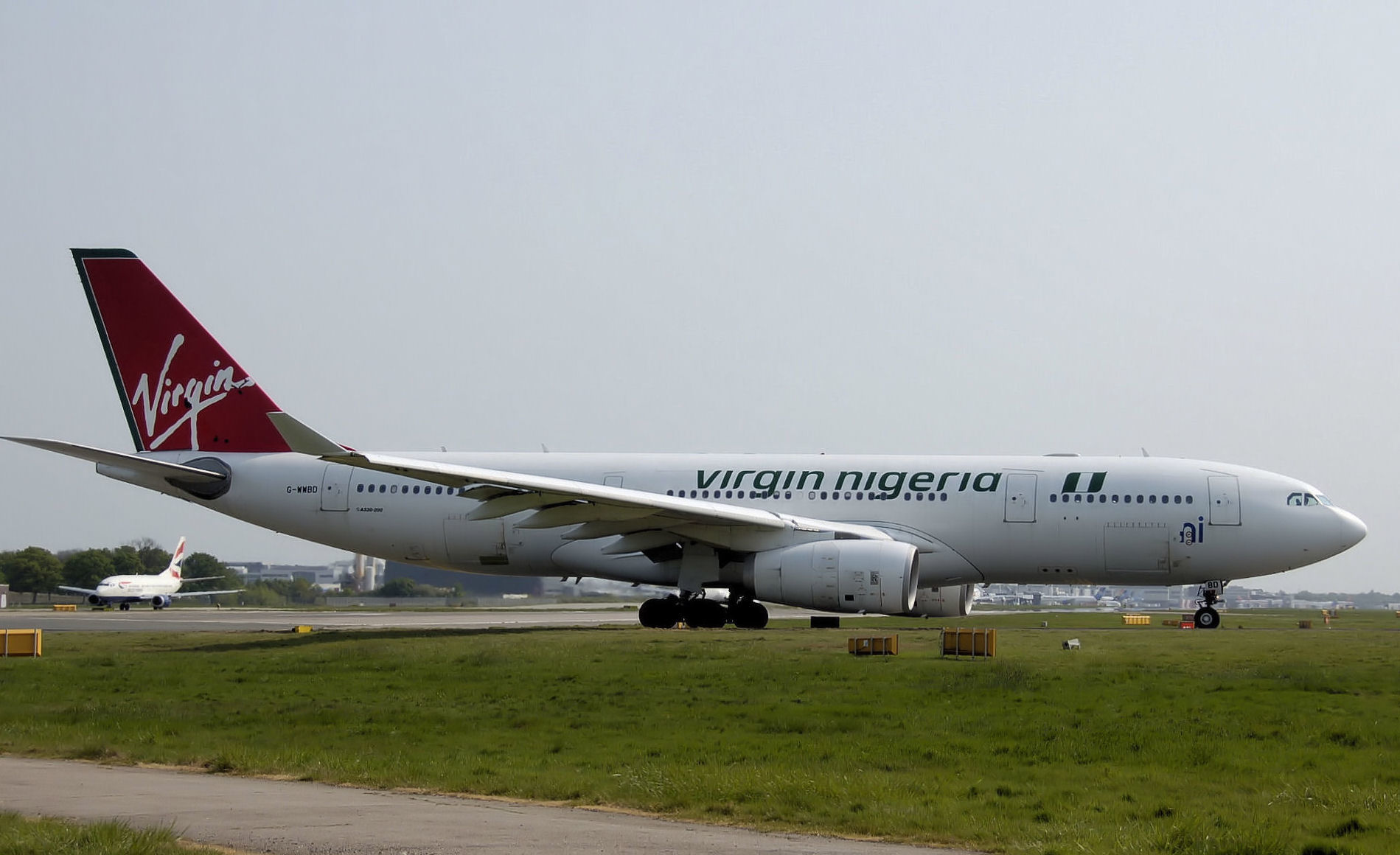
A Virgin Nigeria Airbus A330-200 at Gatwick Airport that was leased from BMI (2007)

Air Nigeria, originally Virgin Nigeria Airways, and then Nigerian Eagle Airlines, was the national flag carrier of Nigeria, which operated scheduled regional and domestic passenger services. The airline's base was Murtala Muhammed International Airport in Ikeja, its head office was in Lagos Island, Lagos, and its registered office was in Ikoyi, Lagos.

The airline, which effectively replaced the defunct Nigeria Airways, was founded in 2004 as a joint venture between Nigerian investors and Virgin Atlantic. Virgin withdrew from the business between 2008 and 2010. Following two name changes, Air Nigeria announced on 6 September 2012 that it had made its staff redundant and ceased operations on 10 September 2012.

== History ==
=== Origins ===
Nigerian institutional investors owned 51% of the company and Virgin Atlantic the remaining 49%. The airline's inaugural flight was on 28 June 2005 from Lagos to London Heathrow, using an Airbus A340-300. Virgin Nigeria quickly became one of Nigeria's largest airlines, carrying its 1,000,000th passenger and 4,000th ton of freight within two years of operation. The airline also received accolades including THISDAY Awards 2006 Airline of the year and a nomination for 2006 African Airline of the year by ASATA (Association of South African Travel Agents). Virgin Nigeria had plans to make Nnamdi Azikiwe International Airport in Abuja its second base, where, in addition to its Lagos base Murtala Muhammed International Airport, it would serve all countries in West Africa.

=== Sale of Virgin's stake and rebranding ===
Logo of Nigerian Eagle Airlines

On 19 August 2008, Virgin Atlantic announced that it was in talks to sell its 49 percent stake and reviewing whether it was appropriate that the Virgin brand should remain linked to Virgin Nigeria. This followed a dispute which arose after Virgin Nigeria's domestic operations were moved against its will by the Ministry of Transportation to Terminal 2. Virgin Nigeria had twice refused the directive to relocate its domestic operations from the international terminal, citing the Memorandum of Mutual Understanding it had signed with the previous (Olusegun Obasanjo) administration, and pending appeal in a Lagos High court, as reasons for not complying.

On 9 January 2009, Virgin Nigeria announced it would suspend all long haul flights to London Gatwick and Johannesburg, effective 27 January 2009.

On 17 September 2009, Virgin Nigeria announced on its website it had rebranded as Nigerian Eagle Airlines. Nigerian Eagle Airlines also stated that it planned to focus on domestic and regional flights with further expansion into Europe and eventually the United States of America. Virgin retained its 49% stake in the new Nigerian Eagle Airlines with the remaining 51% held by Kassy Olisakwe.

=== Rebranding as Air Nigeria, and cessation of operations ===
On 2 June 2010, following the acquisition of a majority share in the airline, Jimoh Ibrahim, the new chairman, announced that the airline had undergone a further name change to Air Nigeria Development Limited, branded as Air Nigeria. On 13 June 2012, the carrier was grounded by regulators for safety checks.

On 6 September 2012 Air Nigeria announced that the management had fired its staff 'for being disloyal' and the airline ceased all its local, regional, and international operations. Operations ceased on 10 September 2012.

On 19 September 2018, the Nigerian government suspended the plans to launch Air Nigeria indefinitely. No concise reasons were given for the suspension.

== Destinations ==
=== Codeshare agreements ===
- Delta Air Lines (SkyTeam)
- Kenya Airways (SkyTeam)

== Fleet ==
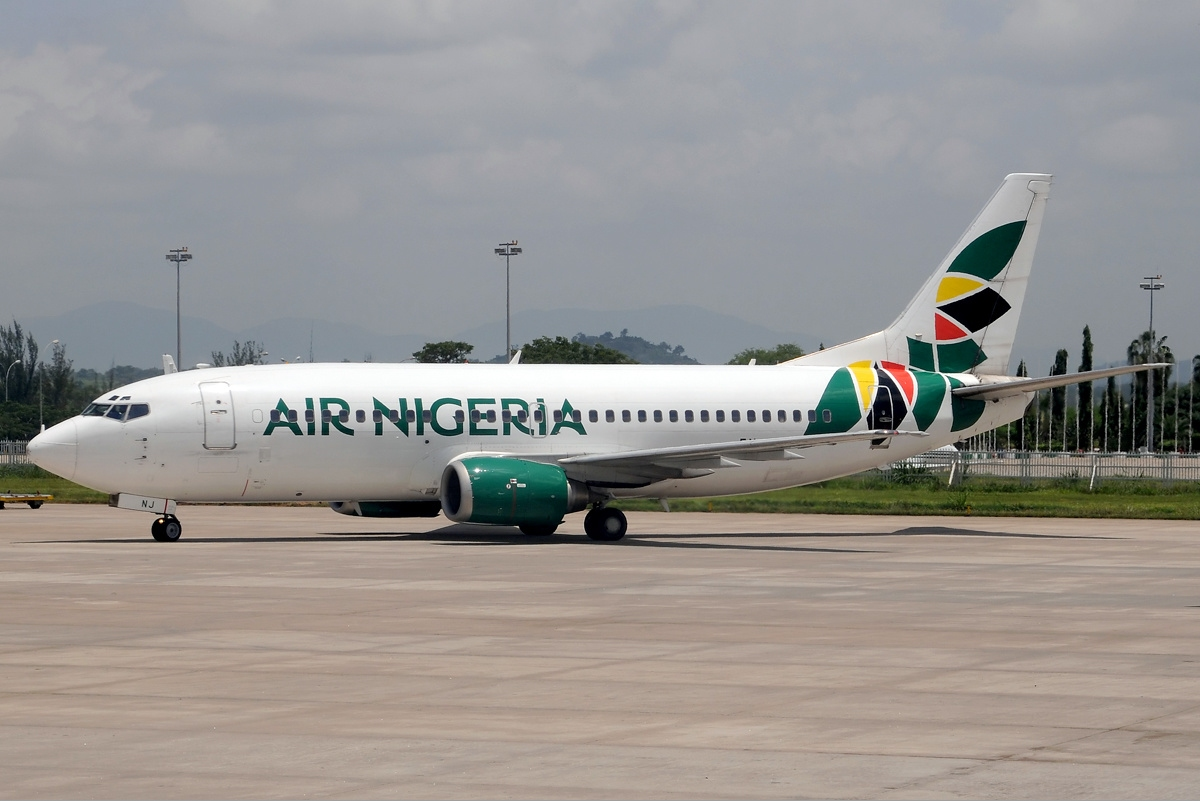
An Air Nigeria Boeing 737-300 at Nnamdi Azikiwe International Airport, Abuja (2011)

=== Closing fleet ===
The Air Nigeria fleet consisted of the following aircraft shortly before it ceased operations (as of April 2012):

Air Nigeria fleet
Aircraft	In fleet	On order	Passengers			Note
Aircraft	In fleet	On order	J	Y	Total	Note
Airbus A330-200	2	—	24	244	268	Leased from EgyptAir
Boeing 737-300	8	—	16	100	116	
Boeing 737-400	1	—				
Embraer 190AR	2	—	12	84	96	
Total	13	—				

=== Historic fleet ===
Before rebranding, Virgin Nigeria had also operated the following aircraft:

Virgin Nigeria Airways past fleet
Aircraft	Total	Introduced	Retired	Notes
Airbus A320-200	2	2005	2007	Leased from BH Air
Airbus A330-200	3	2007	2007	Leased from British Midland International
Airbus A340-300	2	2005	2006	Leased from Virgin Atlantic
ATR 42-500	1	2008	2009	Leased from Interstate Airlines
Boeing 737-300	2	2005	2007	Leased from GECAS
Boeing 767-300ER	2	2007	2009	Leased from SmartLynx Airlines
Fokker 50	1	2007	2008	Leased from Denim Air

== See also ==
- Arik Air
- Nigeria Airways
- Airlines of Africa
