= Han Nyein Oo =

Burmese social media personality

Han Nyein Oo (Burmese: ဟန်ငြိမ်းဦး; born Soe Naing (စိုးနိုင်), 1989), is a Burmese social media personality, pro-military supporter and lobbyist. Before the Myanmar coup d'état, he was considered one of the main sources for Burmese celebrity gossip and yellow journalism.

== Career ==
He started his career as a celebrity gossip reporter on Facebook. After having been banned from Facebook, he moved his commentary to Telegram. Following the 2021 Myanmar coup d'état, he became a lobbyist for the junta. Han Nyein Oo had more than 100,000 subscribers on Telegram. He has been accused of using revenge porn against female activists whom he opposes.

Han Nyein Oo has been accused of allegedly engaging police officers and military troops, ordering them to make arrests and carry out attacks on anti-junta activists and supporters of the NUG. He has conducted investigations and shared personal information about anti-military dissidents, NUG supporters, and donors of the PDF.

His channel gained increasing influence among both the highest military council and lower-level military authorities.

He posted about shop owners who had announced on social media that their stores would be closed on February 1 during the silent strike, which ultimately resulted in the arrest of 200 individuals, including these shop owners.

In 2020, Han Nyein Oo was sued by the model Thin Thin for posting gossip about her on Facebook. He was charged under Section 66 (d) of the Telecommunications Law, which prohibits online defamation. In retaliation, Thin Thin and the film director Wyne were arrested after he disclosed their political information in February 2022.

As a main source for arrest-related news, Radio Free Asia (RFA), along with several Burmese civil society groups, actively monitors Han Nyein Oo's reports. Political activists who were exposed on the channel during January and February have been swiftly apprehended by military authorities. Additionally, victims have reported incidents of having their homes and business properties confiscated. According to reports from RFA, Han Nyein Oo's reports have led to the arrest and confiscation of property of over 200 individuals, including notable figures such as Pencilo, Mg Mg Aye, Chan Chan, Daung, Chit Thu Wai, Paing Phyo Thu, and many others.

Writer Naing Thint Myat is urging the public to strongly oppose the military's arrests of activists, which are allegedly ordered by Han Nyein Oo. At a military press conference, Deputy Minister of Information Major General Zaw Min Tun stated that Han Nyein Oo has no affiliation with the military and did not give any orders.

On March 12, 2022, Telegram removed Han Nyein Oo's channel due to violations of standards.

On April 19, 2022, comedian Kaung Kyaw was arrested by military forces, just two days after Han Nyein Oo's report.
