= Rebecca Win =

Rebecca Win ရေဗက္ကာဝင်း
- Born: May Hnin Nu; 15 February 1986 (age 40); Myitkyina, Burma
- Genres: Pop
- Occupations: Singer-songwriter; model
- Instruments: Vocals; Guitar
- Years active: 2004–present

Rebecca Win (Burmese: ရေဗက္ကာဝင်း, pronounced [jèbɛʔka̰ wɪ́ɰ̃]; born May Hnin Nu (မေနှင်းနု [mè n̥ɪ́ɴ nṵ]) on 15 February 1986) is a retired Burmese singer and model. She performed in the opening and closing ceremonies of the 2013 Southeast Asian Games in Naypyidaw. Rebecca Win was a judge on the major televised singing competition Eain Mat Sone Yar (Where dreams meet) and also Myanmar's Got Talent.

In 2013, she was appointed as a women's ambassador, along with Chit Thu Wai for Myanmar to raise awareness for gender equality and women's rights.

== Early life and education ==
Rebecca Win was born on 15 February 1986 in Myitkyina, Kachin State, to a Burmese father and a Kachin mother, one of four siblings. Her aunt L Khun Yi, her cousins L Lun Wa and L Seng Zi are also popular singers. Her family moved to Yangon when she was just six months old. She converted to Christianity when she joined the church choir at age six. As of 2006, she was a final year Japanese major at the University of Foreign Languages, Yangon.

== Career ==
Rebecca Win was first noticed when she entered Yangon-based City FM Radio's Music Idol contest in 2004. In 2016, she prepared to release three solo albums.

She released an album, "Meka" on 9 February 2018, in the Kachin language.

She announced to the media on 3 April 2020, that she was taking a rest from the professional life of music and modelling and requested all not to call her Rebecca Win, her professional name.

== Discography ==
- Takha Talay (Sometimes)
- Shote Kone Daw Me (Getting Complicated), collaborated with Yi Mon
- Maka (2018)

== TV show ==
- Myanmar's Got Talent

== Personal life ==
Rebecca Win married to Kaung Kyaw Swe, a businessman. They celebrated their wedding reception in Judson Church in Yangon for a traditional wedding on May 4 2013, and at Sedona Hotel Yangon, on 10 May 2013, and concluded a no-fault divorce in 2020.
