= Min Ko Naing =

Burmese activist (born 1962)

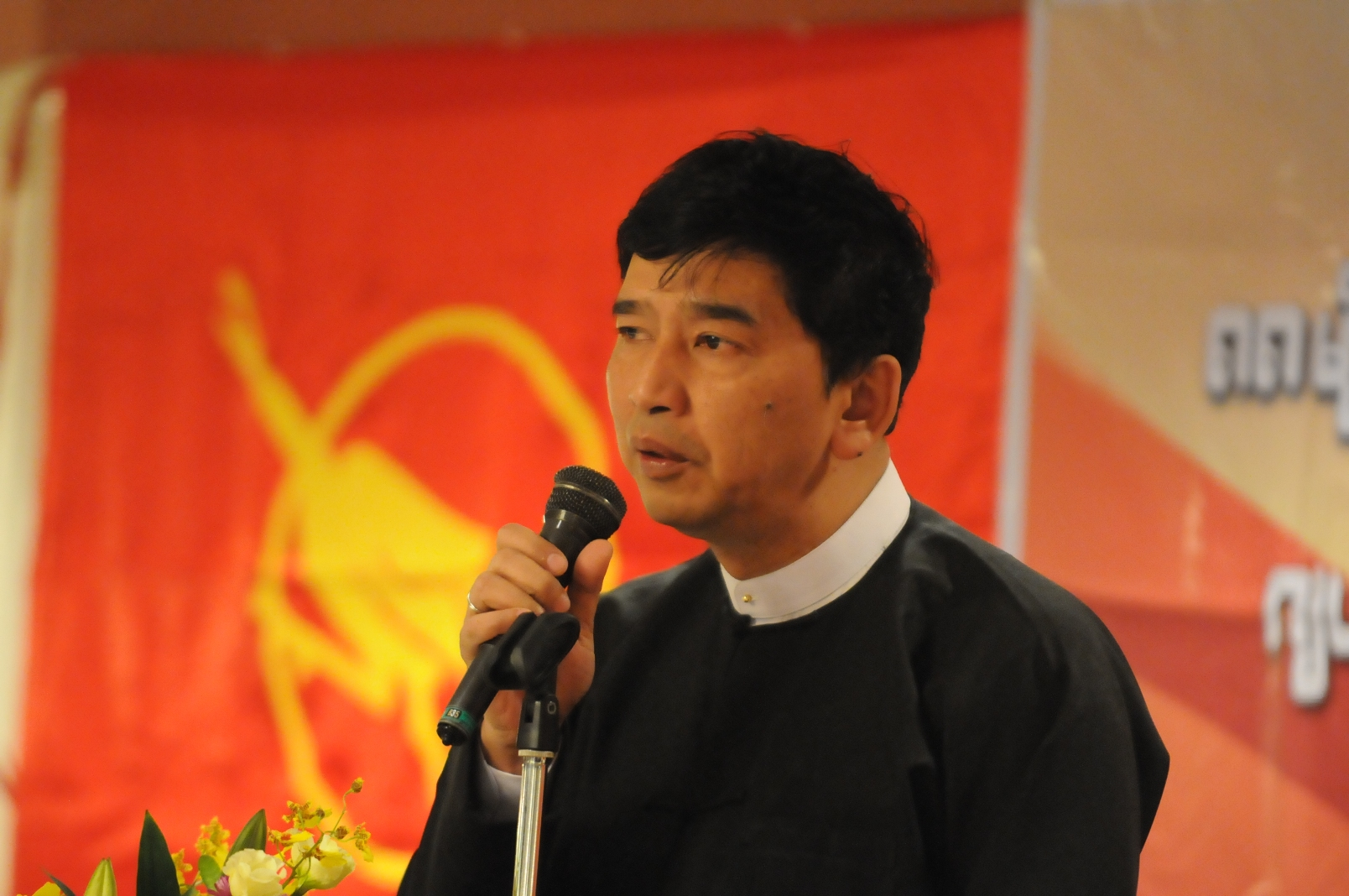
- Min Ko Naing in 2014
- Born: Paw Oo Tun; 18 October 1962 (age 63); Yangon, Burma
- Education: Rangoon Arts & Sciences University, 3rd year B.S. Zoology
- Organization(s): All Burma Federation of Student Unions; 88 Generation Students Group; The 88 Generation Peace and Open Society
- Movement: 8888 Uprising
- Parent(s): U Thet Nyunt, Daw Hla Kyi
- Awards: Gwangju Prize for Human Rights (2009); Civil Courage Prize (2005); John Humphrey Freedom Award (1999); National Order of Merit (2015)
- Website: Min Ko Naing

Paw Oo Tun (Burmese: ပေါ်ဦးထွန်း [pɔ̀ ʔú tʰʊ́ɰ̃]; born 18 October 1962), better known by his alias Min Ko Naing (မင်းကိုနိုင် [mɪ́ɰ̃ kò nàɪɰ̃], lit. "conqueror of kings"), is a leading democracy activist and dissident from Myanmar. He has spent most of the years since 1988 imprisoned by the state for his opposition activities. The New York Times has described him as Burma's "most influential opposition figure after Aung San Suu Kyi".

== Early life/student years ==
Min Ko Naing was born in Yangon, the third son of Thet Nyunt and Hla Kyi, a couple from Mudon in Mon State. He has three sisters: Kyi Kyi Nyunt, Ye Ye Nyunt, and Thadar Nyunt. His parents are of ethnic Mon people but Min Ko Naing has only a smattering of Mon language. He has remained involved in the Yangon's Mon community, serving a speaker on the annual Mon National Day.

Min Ko Naing began his undergrad study at the Rangoon Arts and Science University in the mid-1980s where he majored in Zoology. During his student years, he was an active member of the arts club, where he enjoyed reading, writing poems and drawing cartoons, especially satirical ones. According to classmates, Min Ko Naing was a member of a performance troupe that took part in the traditional Than Gyat competition during Thingyan (Burma's annual Water Festival) in April. Taking the name "Goat-Mouth and Spirit-Eye", the troupe performed satirical plays and sketches satirizing Burma's military government and the lack of freedom and democracy. Though the troupe was popular, it also attracted the attention of Burmese Military Intelligence agents, who began to track Min Ko Naing's movements. Despite the illegality of forming student unions in Burma, Min Ko Naing and other students formed clandestine study groups to discuss Burma's political situation, which grew into a secret student union.

== 8-8-88 Uprising and the All Burma Federation of Student Unions ==
In September 1987, Ne Win voided most denominations of the kyat without warning, causing many people to lose their savings overnight. Students who saved money for tuition fees were particularly affected. The announcement led to riots at several universities. The situation was further exacerbated by the shooting of protesting student Phone Maw in a 12 March 1988 clash with police. On 16 March, Min Ko Naing organized a rally of 3,000 students on the RASU campus in which he spoke about the role of student movements in Burmese history. When the students attempted to march to the Rangoon Institute of Technology, where Phone Maw had been killed, they encountered a barbed wire barricade at Inya Lake and were attacked by riot police, resulting in several deaths and many arrests.

Shortly after this, Ne Win's government closed the universities, and the movement went underground. Min Ko Naing continued to organize protesters and circulate posters of the violence at Inya Lake. Ne Win soon agreed to step down from office, and on 7 July, many imprisoned student activists were released. The following day, Min Ko Naing and others released the first statement in the name of the new All Burma Federation of Student Unions (ABFSU), an organization that had previously been known for its struggle against British colonial rule: "We shouldn't be swayed by the release of our fellow students. We will continue to fight."The ABSFU continued to release statements by Min Ko Naing urging protests to the military government, including one calling for a general strike on 8-8-88, a number that would later become synonymous with the movement itself.

The 8-8-88 general strike drew hundreds of thousands of people to the streets of Yangon, and is widely seen as a turning point in the Burmese democracy movement. Min Ko Naing continued to speak to crowds in front of the US Embassy and Rangoon General Hospital, the sites of previous killings of protesters by Burmese government forces. He also arranged for the daughter of independence hero Aung San, Aung San Suu Kyi, to make her first speech to a crowd at Shwedagon Pagoda. Aung San Suu Kyi would go on to be elected prime minister in the 1990 general election, only to be denied office and imprisoned by the State Law and Order Restoration Council, the new military government.

The protests lasted until 18 September, at which point soldiers opened fire on the crowds, resulting in at least 3,000 deaths.

== Political imprisonment ==
Forced to go underground, Min Ko Naing continued his organizing work while moving from house to house every night to avoid arrest. After several months, he was captured along with other students. He was sentenced to 20 years' imprisonment, under Section 5(j) of the 1950 Emergency Provisions Act for instigating "disturbances to the detriment of law and order, peace and tranquility". His sentence was commuted to 10 years under a general amnesty in January 1993. He was considered a prisoner of conscience by Amnesty International, which intensively campaigned for his release.

According to Amnesty International, Min Ko Naing was severely tortured and ill-treated during the early stages of his detention. His health suffered as a consequence. During his interrogation he was reportedly forced to stand in water for two weeks until he collapsed, and as a result, his left foot became completely numb. On 19 November 2004, he was released from prison after being held for 15 years.

== Second imprisonment ==
Min Ko Naing was rearrested in late September 2006. Htay Kywe, Ko Ko Gyi, Pyone Cho and Min Zeya were arrested along with him, in advance of Burma's 2006 national convention. In January 2007, they were released, without official explanation for either their original arrest or their sudden release.

== Campaigns ==
Following his release from prison, Min Ko Naing helped to found the 88 Generation Students Group, which continued to fight for democracy in Burma. From 10 to 18 October 2006 (his 44th birthday), some of the "88 generation" students organized a nationwide campaign, "White Expression" to pressure the military government to release him and all other political prisoners. The participants wore white clothing in a show of support for the release of all political prisoners. They also organized a signature campaign to pressure the junta to release him and all political prisoners. The campaign was launched a week after Min Ko Naing and four colleagues were arrested. Many well-known artists from Myanmar (such as Ludu Daw Amar and Zarganar) signed the petition.

On 4 January 2007, the 88 Generation Students organized the "Open Heart Campaign". He said to the Irrawaddy Magazine that the campaign was to encourage the people to exercise freedom of expression. People could write to State Peace and Development Council leader senior general Than Shwe about their feelings under the military government.

The 88 Generation Students Group also conducted a "White Sunday" campaign from 11 March 2007 to 20 May 2007 to express support for family members of political prisoners. They visited the families of political prisoners in Yangon every Sunday during this period.

== Political imprisonment in 2007 ==
He was arrested again around midnight on 21 August 2007, with other 13 leaders of the 88 Generation Students for organizing peaceful demonstrations. United States Government condemned the Burmese junta's arrest of them. On 11 November 2008 Min Ko Naing was sentenced to 65 years imprisonment, as 22 others had been for their role in the August 2007 demonstrations. On 15 November 2008 Min Ko Naing was transferred to Kengtung prison in Shan State, where isolated, bleak cells were constructed in mid-2000 for solitary confinement.

== Release and political career ==
Min Ko Naing was released along with numerous other activists on 13 January 2012, as part of a mass presidential pardon for political activists.

It was believed that he would contest the 2015 general elections for a seat in Assembly of the Union, but he did not. Many observers have said that beyond Aung Sann Suu Kyi, he and his colleagues are best suited to steer the country's political landscape.

He has been on the run following the military coup on February 1, 2021. He has urged the public to take a "no recognition, no participation" approach to the new military regime and called on people to work together to protest against the coup.

On 13 February 2021, in the aftermath of the 2021 Myanmar coup d'état, Min Ko Naing and six other high-profile individuals, namely Kyaw Min Yu, Myo Yan Naung Thein, Insein Aung Soe, Mg Mg Aye, Pencilo, and Lynn Lynn were charged and issued arrest warrants under section 505 (b) of the Myanmar Penal Code by the State Administration Council for inciting unrest against the state and threatening "public tranquility" through their social media posts.

== International recognition ==
Min Ko Naing has won numerous international awards for his activism. These include the 2009 Gwangju Prize for Human Rights; the 2005 Civil Courage Prize, which he shared with Anna Politkovskaya and Munir Said Thalib; the 2000 Homo Homini Award of People In Need; the 2001 Student Peace Prize; and the 1999 John Humphrey Freedom Award, which he shared with Cynthia Maung of the Mae Tao Clinic.

In 2012, he was announced the winner of an award from the US National Endowment for Democracy, but stated his intention not to attend the ceremony in solidarity with other Burmese activists who had been denied visas.

== Rohingya genocide ==
In a press conference, September 13, 2017—at the height of the Rohingya genocide (the persecution of, and attacks upon, Myanmar's mostly Muslim ethnic minority, the Rohingya) -- Min Ko Naing reportedly appeared with a group of 88 Generation Peace and Open Society activists, at which the attendees issued a written statement denying the version of events portrayed in prominent international media. Speaking at the event, Min Ko Naing sided with Myanmar's civilian government in its harsh dealing with the Rohingya community. He said that the problems in Rakhine's state were not religious or racial, but rather were about terrorism and immigration laws—stating that the Rohingya "are not one of 135 ethnic groups in Myanmar."
