= Kyaw Min Yu =

Burmese political prisoner (1969–2022)

- ကျော်မင်းယု
- Born: 13 February 1969; Shan State, Burma
- Died: 23 July 2022 (aged 53); Insein Prison, Yangon, Myanmar
- Other names: Ko Jimmy
- Education: Rangoon Arts & Sciences University (3rd year Physics)
- Criminal penalty: Death
- Criminal status: Executed by hanging
- Spouse: Nilar Thein
- Children: 2

Kyaw Min Yu (Burmese: ကျော်မင်းယု; also known as Ko Jimmy; 13 February 1969 – 23 July 2022) was a Burmese writer, political prisoner, and a member of the 88 Generation Students Group. He was executed in July 2022 after being sentenced to death for activism against the junta that seized power in a coup in 2021.

== Career ==
=== Activism ===
Kyaw Min Yu rose to prominence during the 8888 Uprising, as a student activist. He was imprisoned for 15 years, from 1988 to 2003, for participating in the 8888 Uprising, and later spent another five years in prison after protesting fuel price hikes with the 88 Generation Students Group in August 2007.

=== Writing ===
He wrote the self-help book Making Friendship (မိတ်ဖြစ်ဆွေဖြစ်), which became a bestseller, in 2005. On 6 September 2012, he published a novel, The Moon in Inle Lake (လမင်းဆန္ဒာအင်းလေးကန်), which had been written in 2010 during a prison sentence in Taunggyi. While serving a sentence in Taunggyi, he wrote a number of political post-modern short stories, published in Japan, under the pen name Pan Pu Lwin Pyin. Ko Jimmy translated numerous novels, including Angels and Demons and The Da Vinci Code, into Burmese while in prison.

=== 2021 Myanmar coup d'état and execution ===
On 13 February 2021, in the aftermath of the 2021 Myanmar coup d'état, Kyaw Min Yu and six other high profile individuals, namely Min Ko Naing, Myo Yan Naung Thein, Insein Aung Soe, Mg Mg Aye, Pencilo, and Lynn Lynn were charged and issued arrest warrants under section 505(b) of the Myanmar Penal Code by the State Administration Council for inciting unrest against the state and threatening "public tranquility" through their social media posts. He was arrested in Dagon Township on 23 October. On 23 January 2022, the Myanmar Military Tribunal sentenced Yu to death under the country's Counterterrorism Law for contacting the Committee Representing Pyidaungsu Hluttaw, National Unity Government (NUG), and People's Defense Force (PDF). On 23 July 2022, it was announced that Yu had been executed along with Phyo Zeya Thaw and two others.

== Personal life ==
Yu was born 13 February 1969, in Shan State in eastern Myanmar. At the time of the 8888 Uprising he was a physics student at Rangoon Arts & Sciences University (later re-named the University of Yangon).

He was married to Nilar Thein, a political activist. They met while incarcerated after the 8888 Uprising and wedded after they were both released in 2004. The couple have a daughter and a son, Phyu Nay Kyi Min Yu and Aww Ratha Minn Yu.

== Death ==
Yu was 53 years old when he was executed in July 2022.

On 28 July 2022, the G7 foreign ministers of Canada, France, Germany, Italy, Japan, the United Kingdom, and the United States of America, and the European Union released a statement strongly condemning Kyaw Min Yu's execution by the military junta.

== Publications ==
- Making Friendship (2005)
- The Moon in Inle Lake (2012)
