= Shwe Du Wun =

Burmese Lethwei fighter (died 2023)

Shwe Du Wun (Burmese: ရွှေဒူဝံ) was a Burmese Lethwei fighter from Hpa-An, Kayin State. He was a former openweight Lethwei World Champion and held the title from 1995 until 1998.

== Career ==
During his career, Shwe Du Wun had a rivalry with Wan Chai and their first fight was in Mandalay, Myanmar in 1995. “I beat him three times. The rest were draws. He was very resilient and strong” said Wan Chai. After retiring, Shwe Du Wun still attended Lethwei fights and supported upcoming Lethwei fighters. Lethwei champion and ONE Championship fighter Soe Lin Oo stated that Shwe Du Wun was his role model.

On April 1, 1998, traditional Lethwei challenge fights were held in commemoration of the 51st Mon National Day in Yangon, Myanmar. In a five-round match, Wan Chai knocked out Shwe Du Wun at 1 minute and four seconds in third-round and won the Openweight Lethwei World Title.

== Death ==
On March 4, 2023, Shwe Du Wun died aboard a passenger bus that crashed and overturned near the mile post No.167 on the Yangon-Mandalay Expressway. Three people died including the former Lethwei champion, while 15 men and 10 women were injured. Initially authorities were not able to identify Shwe Du Wun because his face was badly damaged.

== Lethwei record (incomplete) ==
Professional Lethwei record
N/A
Date	Result	Opponent	Event	Location	Method	Round	Time
1998-04-01	Win	(Myanmar) Wan Chai	51st Mon National Day, Aung San Indoor Stadium	Yangon, Myanmar	KO	3	1:04
Lost Openweight Lethwei World Title

Awards and achievements
Preceded by Shwe War Tun	Openweight Lethwei World Champion; 1995 – April 1, 1998	Succeeded by Wan Chai
