= New Page (TV series) =

Burmese television series

- Poster
- Burmese: စာမျက်နှာသစ်
- Genre: Music, Drama
- Created by: Canal+ (Myanmar)
- Directed by: César de Lorme
- Starring: Aung Myint Myat; Nant Chit Nadi Zaw; Aung Paing; Htun Naung Sint; Rebecca Win; Wai Lar Ri; Shwe Sin; Ngwe Soe; Yadanar Wyne; Thura Maung Cho
- Country of origin: Myanmar
- Original language: Burmese
- No. of seasons: 2
- No. of episodes: 20

Production
- Production location: Myanmar
- Running time: 40 minutes
- Production company: Canal+ (Myanmar)

Original release
- Network: Canal+ Zat Lenn
- Release: 14 October 2018 – 17 October 2019

New Page (Burmese: စာမျက်နှာသစ်) is a Burmese musical-drama television series directed by Cesar de Lorme. It aired on Canal+ Zat Lenn. Its season 1 aired from October 14 to December 16, 2018, on every Sunday at 19:00 for 10 episodes and season 2 aired from August 15 to October 17, 2019, on every Thursday at 20:00 for 10 episodes.

== Cast ==
- Aung Myint Myat as Kyaw Thura
- Nant Chit Nadi Zaw as Nayee Oo
- Aung Paing as Htun Naung
- Htun Naung Sint as Soe Htun Aung
- Wai Lar Ri as Myat Thiri Wai
- Hsu Htet Hlaing as Nway Tay Cho
- Than Than Soe as Daw Saw Mya Kyi
- Phu Sone as Daw Nilar Kyaw
- Yadanar Wyne as Myat Lay Nwe
- Rebecca Win as Rebecca Win
- Shwe Sin as Than Thar Nwe
- Ngwe Soe as Saya Phone Myint Thu
- Thura Maung Cho as Ko Ko Oo
- Shwe Poe Kaung as Shwe Poe Kaung
