= Myo Yan Naung Thein =

Burmese activist

- မျိုးရန်နောင်သိန်း
- Born: March 31, 1974 (age 52)
- Occupation: Pro-democracy activist
- Organization: Bayda Institute
- Known for: Activism
- Movement: Saffron Revolution, 2021 Myanmar anti-coup moment
- Criminal status: Citizenship revoked (2022)

Myo Yan Naung Thein (Burmese: မျိုးရန်နောင်သိန်း; born 31 March 1974) is a Burmese pro-democracy activist, and former chief research officer of the National League for Democracy's Central Committee for Research and Strategy Studies. He is a former political prisoner who spent more than 10 years in jail during three separate prison terms. Myo Yan Naung Thein is the founder and director of the Bayda Institute.

== Political career ==
Myo Yan Naung Thein started his political career at 21 while studying at the Rangoon Institute of Technology (RIT). In 1996, he led student demonstrations with six other students, demanding justice for police brutalities against students and unfair dismissal of students from the University.

He was sentenced to prison for seven years in 1997. He actively participated in the 2007 Saffron Revolution before being arrested again and imprisoned.

On 3 October 2016, he was arrested under Section 66(d) of the Telecommunications Law after posting a status on his Facebook page which criticized Senior General Min Aung Hlaing, then the police force and Myanmar armed forces' Commander in Chief, Minister of Border Affairs, and Minister of Home Affairs, following an attack by ethnic insurgents on several police stations in Rakhine State.

On 7 April 2017, Kamayut Township court sentenced him to six months in jail. He was released from prison early, on 12 April 2017.

On 26 July 2019, he was suspended from his duties as he was accused of violating the rules of the NLD.

On 13 February 2021, in the aftermath of the 2021 Myanmar coup d'état, Myo Yan Naung Thein and six other high profile individuals (Min Ko Naing, Kyaw Min Yu, Mg Mg Aye, Pencilo, Insein Aung Soe, and Lynn Lynn) were charged and issued arrest warrants under section 505 (b) of the penal code by the State Administration Council for inciting unrest against the state and threatening "public tranquility" through their social media posts.

On 4 March 2022, the military council announced that his citizenship had been terminated.

== Controversies and criticisms ==
In July 2019, while serving as the chief research officer of the National League for Democracy (NLD) Central Research Team, a formal complaint was lodged against him. Consequently, the party formed an investigation commission led by U Nyan Win to examine the case. Following the investigation, he was replaced in his position by U Kyaw Wunna. In August 2019, the NLD decided to suspend him from his party duties, stating that he had undertaken tasks not assigned to him by the party. While the NLD refused to publicly disclose the specific details of the offense, pro-military media outlets alleged that the dismissal was related to sexual misconduct.

In 2022, Myo Yan Naung Thein faced criticism for a Facebook Live video in which he allegedly urged violence against prominent monks, including Sitagu Sayadaw and Ashin Chekinda, who are widely perceived as being supportive of the military.
