= Soe Zeya Tun =

Burmese journalist

- စိုးဇေယျထွန်း
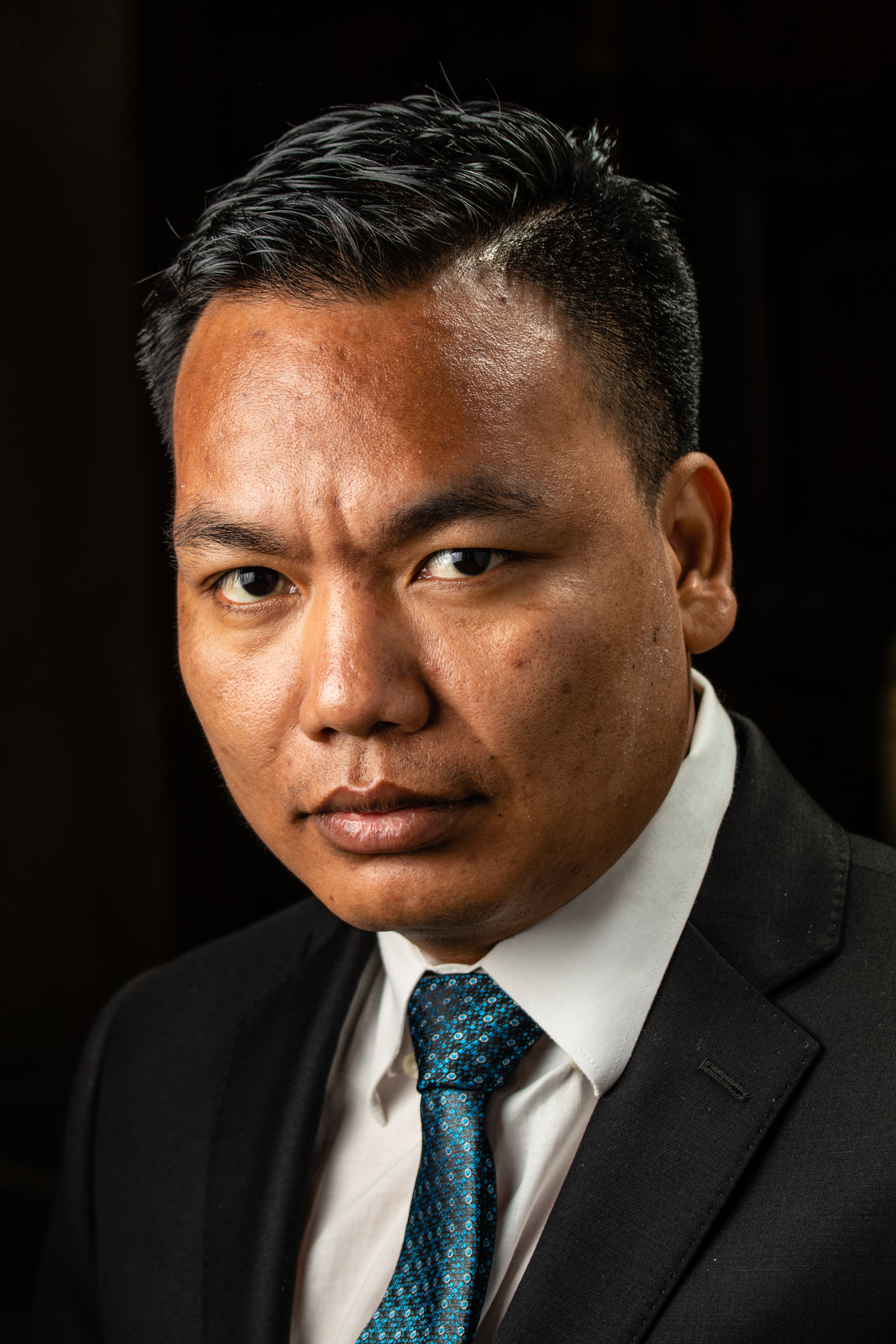
- Soe Zeya Tun in 2018
- Born: Soe Zeya Tun; Myanmar
- Occupation: Journalist
- Awards: Pulitzer Prize

Soe Zeya Tun (Burmese: စိုးဇေယျထွန်း) is a Burmese Pulitzer Prize-winning photojournalist at Reuters.

On 17 April 2021, in the aftermath of the 2021 Myanmar coup d'état, he was charged and issued arrest warrants under section 505 (A) of the Myanmar Penal Code by the State Administration Council for speaking out against the military coup. Along with several other celebrities, he was charged with calling for participation in the Civil Disobedience Movement (CDM) and damaging the state's ability to govern, with supporting the Committee Representing Pyidaungsu Hluttaw, and with generally inciting the people to disturb the peace and stability of the nation.
