= Htun Naung Sint =

Burmese singer and actor (born 1997)

- Born: Htun Naung Sint; 14 June 1997 (age 28); Mohnyin, Kachin State, Myanmar
- Genres: Pop
- Occupation: Singer-songwriter
- Instruments: Vocals; Guitar; Piano
- Years active: 2016–present

Htun Naung Sint (Burmese: ထွန်းနောင်ဆင့်; born 14 June 1997) is a Burmese singer and actor. He received national attention after winning the first season of The X Factor Myanmar.

== Early life and education ==
Htun Naung Sint was born on 14 June 1997 in Mohnyin, Kachin State, Myanmar to ethnic Shan parents. He studied at the Mandalay University of Foreign Languages, majoring in French in his third year.

== Career ==
Htun Naung Sint started performing in public in 2016. He wanted to pursue a career in music, and so he auditioned for the first season of The X Factor Myanmar.

After progressing through the rounds, he reached the final on 15 December 2016. After a public vote, he was declared the winner, receiving Ks.15 million and a solo album recording contract. He immediately released his winner's single, "Kyway", an original song written by Kyar Pauk. After winning The X Factor Myanmar, he began shooting for commercial advertisements, stage performances, and preparing to record his first solo album.

He made his acting debut in the musical series New Page alongside Aung Myint Myat, Thura Mg Cho, Nant Chit Nadi Zaw and Su Htet Hlaing. The series aired on Canal+ and MRTV-4 in November 2018. He then starred in the second season of New Page, which aired on 22 August 2019.

== Filmography ==
=== Television series ===
Year	English title	Burmese title	Network
2018	New Page	စာမျက်နှာသစ်	Canal+, MRTV-4
2019	New Page: Season 2	စာမျက်နှာသစ် ၂	Canal+, MRTV-4

== Discography ==
=== Singles ===
- Achit Nae Ma Kin Naing Kya Thu Myat (အချစ်နဲ့ မကင်းနိုင်ကြသူများ) (2019)
- Ma Tan Par Buu (မတန်ပါဘူး) (2019)
- Pyone (ပြုံး) (2019)
- I Miss You (2020)
- My Quarantine Diary (2020)
- Perfect Love (2020)
- Stranger (သူစိမ်း) (2020)

=== Group albums ===
- Nway Thingyan (နွေသင်္ကြန်) (2019)
- Pet Pet Pet (ပတ်ပတ်ပတ်) (2019)
- Dream 6 (2019)
- OST-
- G Hall Girl(with မိုးသောက်)(2020)
