= Chit Thu Wai =

Burmese actress, singer and medical doctor

- ချစ်သုဝေ
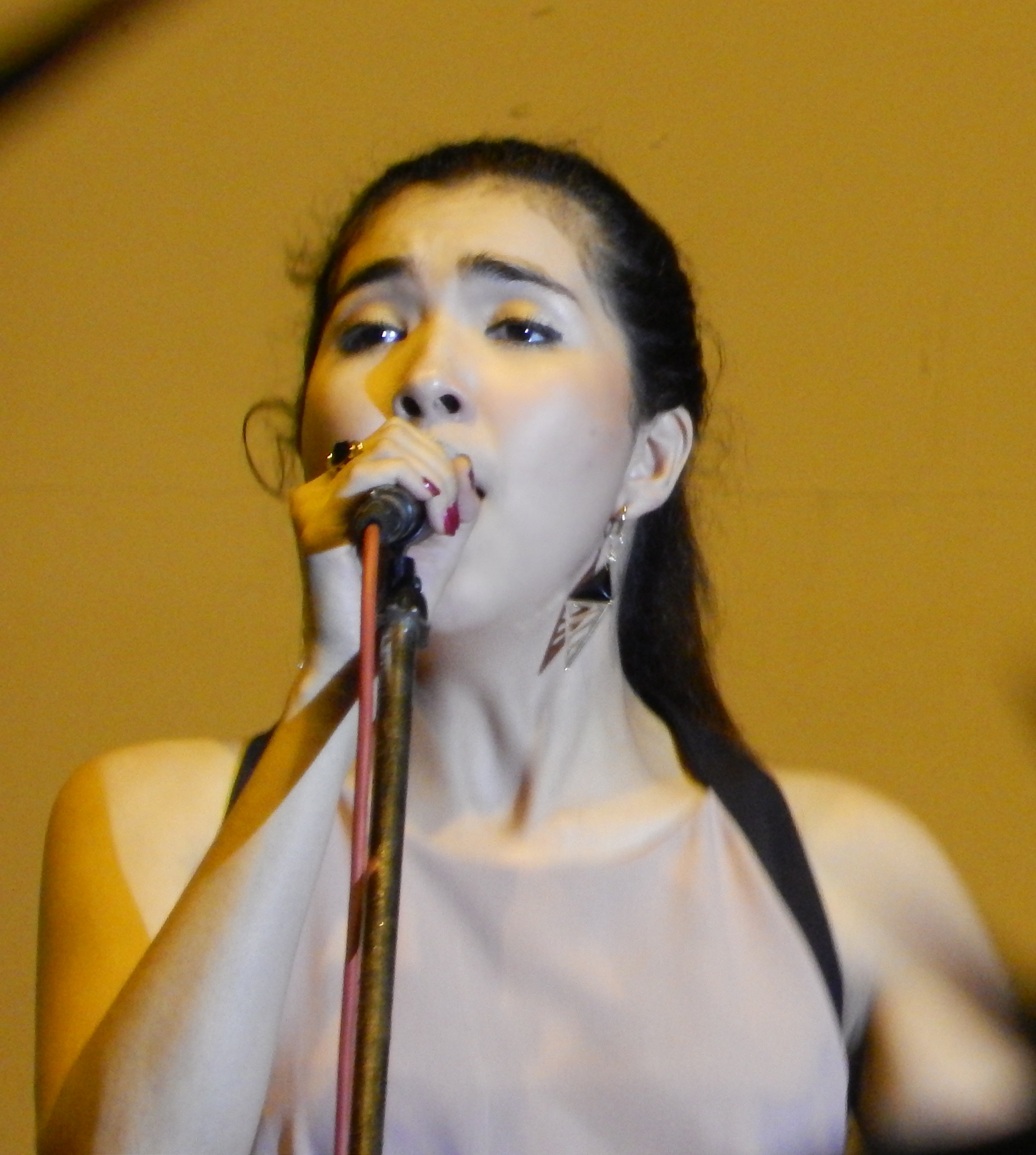
- Born: 10 August 1984 (age 42); Yangon, Myanmar
- Other name: Treza
- Education: University of Medicine 2, Yangon
- Occupations: Actress, singer
- Height: 5 ft 4 in (1.63 m)
- Spouse: Lynn Lynn (m. 2014)
- Musical career
- Genre: Pop
- Instruments: Vocals; piano; guitar
- Years active: 2000–present

Chit Thu Wai (Burmese: ချစ်သုဝေ; born 10 August 1984) is a Burmese actress, singer and medical doctor. She has achieved fame and success as an actress and singer.

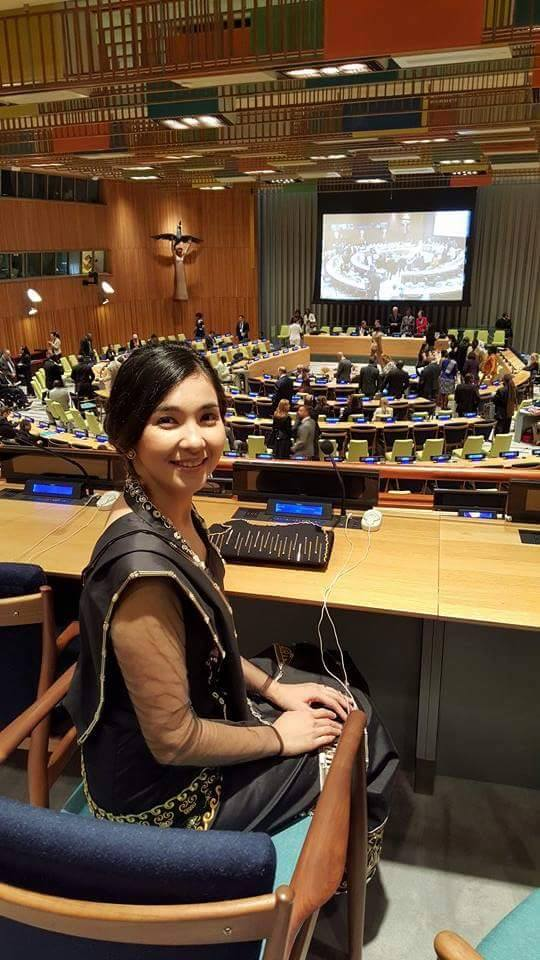
Chit attended the United Nations General Assembly as a Hand-washing Ambassador from Myanmar

In 2015, she represented Myanmar at the United Nations General Assembly as a Hand-washing Ambassador. Since 2006, she has initiated hygiene awareness programs promoting disease prevention through handwashing with soap. A core supporter of the National League for Democracy, she also actively participated in the party's November 2025 election campaign. Chit Thu Wai was listed in The Myanmar Times' "Top 10 Actors" in 2019.

== Early life and education ==
Chit Thu Wai was born on 10 August 1984 in Yangon, Myanmar to parent Zaw Win and his wife De De. Her father Zaw Win, is a music producer and founder of the Metal Zone Studio. She is the youngest daughter of two siblings, having an elder sister, Chit Su Wai, a singer. She attended high school at Basic Education High School No. 3 Mingalar Taung Nyunt and graduated from University of Medicine 2, Yangon with a degree in M.B.B.S.

She is a practicing Roman Catholic. She was interested in singing since childhood, the love of music was seeded in her when her father sent her to a Sunday school.

== Music career ==
She began her music career in 2000 as a singer in performing at the Thingyan music concerts. The same year, she launched her debut album "Tho...Phay Phay Nae May May" (To...Father and Mother) which was a duet album with her sister Chit Su Wai. In 2006, she released her second duet album "Ta Shite Mat Mat" together with her sister. She has become popular due to "Takal So Yin" song from the group album "Yuu Aung Chit Mi Thu". Since then, she gained the first recognition from her fans and she engaged in shooting commercial advertisements, stage performances, and many concerts at various locations throughout Myanmar. At the same time, she also sang a lot of songs, cooperating and sang together with local artists. In 2008, she participated in group album "10 Seconds". One of the songs from that album, "A Phyu Yaung Lay Par" song which became widely popular in local and has been one of the all-time hit in her career.

In 2010, she released her debut solo album "Tain Twe Nay Tae Ayet" (Where The Cloud Lies) which spawned more huge hits. Many music industry records have followed since then. The song "Tain Twe Nay Tae Ayet" was the hit song of the album. Her first solo album was more successful than her two duet albums – which made everyone to start recognising her as Chit Thu Wai.

In January 2013, she released an album "Mee Eain Ka Byar" which was a duet album with her partner Lynn Lynn. The follow-up video album on 5 March 2015. Her second solo album "Promise" was released on 14 February 2019.

== Acting career ==
She made her acting debut with a leading role in the film Nay Ta Chan La Ta Chan (Half Moon Half Sun) alongside Sai Sai Kham Leng and Ye Lay. The film was directed by Zaw Ko Ko and released in 2006.

In 2007, she took on her first big-screen leading role in the film Nge Thu Moh Ma Thi Bar (Don't Know Because I Am Young) alongside Lu Min which screened in Myanmar cinemas in 2008. The film is based on Ma Sandar's novel Don't Know Because I Am Young and nominated for many awards at the 2008 Myanmar Academy Award.

In 2011, she starred in her second big-screen film A Htar Thi Nae Nhint Khar Chit where she played the leading role with Nay Toe, Min Maw Kun, and Wutt Hmone Shwe Yi which screened in Myanmar cinemas in 2012. Later, she starred in big-screen films Thike Ka Lar Tal Sakar Ma Pyaw Buu and Tay Tay Lay Pal Lar A Kyi Kyi Lar, played the female lead. From 2006 to present, she has acted in 5 big-screen films and over 100 direct-to-video films.

In 2013, she starred as Mary in the stage musical Jesus of Nazareth: The Musical.

== Brand ambassadorships ==
Chit Thu Wai was appointed as a brand ambassador of Lifebuoy, a soap product of Unilever. On 27 November 2017, she started working as a brand ambassador for Nestlé's Barley milk product.

== Humanitarian and social work ==
She is a Myanmar representative in Vietnam for ASEAN, an ambassador for UNICEF, a monthly donor for ‘Children Our Future’ as well as supports two medical students in Myanmar for their expenses. She also works as an education Ambassador in Myanmar and supports FED, an education program for children of immigrant workers in Myanmar.

In 2012, she became a member of Myanmar's Consumer Protection Association. In 2013, she was appointed as an ambassador for the Myanmar Disabled People's Organization. Also in 2013, she was appointed as a women's ambassador, along with Rebecca Win for Myanmar to raise awareness for gender equality and women's rights.

Chit Thu Wai has initiated a hygiene awareness program, promoting disease prevention through hand-washing with soap. In 2015, she attended to the United Nations General Assembly as a Hand-washing Ambassador from Myanmar to raise awareness of handwashing with soap to help reduce child and newborn mortality. At these events, she did galvanise support for the inclusion of handwashing as a hygiene indicator in the Sustainable Development Goals (SDGs) and spread the message about the importance of hand washing. Among the events at the UNGA week, the highlight of Chit Thu Wai's role is her attendance and speech at the Unilever Hygiene and Nutrition Luncheon on 27 September.

She delivered aid in the form of clothing, food, medical supplies and educational materials to the many IDPs at the Wan Wa and Haipa displacement camps, as well as offering moral support and occasional medical advice as needed. The International Red Cross and UN organizations including the World Food Programme and UNICEF were also on hand, independent of Chit Thu Wai, to offer humanitarian assistance.

Chit Thu Wai and Lynn Lynn have founded KhitThit Foundation for the celebration of their twin daughters’ birthday on 19 February 2019. The purpose of the foundation is to support under 5-year-old children who have congenital heart defects in medical care. She is an education ambassador for Myanmar.

== Political activities ==
Following the 2021 Myanmar coup d'état, Chit Thu Wai was active in the anti-coup movement both in person at rallies and through social media. She joined the "We Want Justice" three-finger salute movement. The movement was launched on social media, and many celebrities have joined the movement.

On 6 April 2021, warrants for her arrest were issued under section 505 (a) of the Myanmar Penal Code by the State Administration Council for speaking out against the military coup. Along with several other celebrities, she was charged with calling for participation in the Civil Disobedience Movement (CDM) and damaging the state's ability to govern, with supporting the Committee Representing Pyidaungsu Hluttaw, and with generally inciting the people to disturb the peace and stability of the nation.

On 17 February 2022, her homes and business property were confiscated by the military council.

== Personal life ==
Chit Thu Wai married to singer Lynn Lynn, on 30 January 2014. They have twin daughters May Myanmar Khit and May Myanmar Thit, born in 2017.

== Filmography ==
=== Film (Cinema) ===
- Nge Thu Moh Ma Thi Bar (ငယ်သူမို့မသိပါ) (2008)
- A Htar A Thit Nae Hna Khar Chit Mal (အထာသိနဲ့နှစ်ခါချစ်) (2012) – Moe Thazin
- Chit San Eain 2028 (2015) – Thet Lyar
- Father's School (အဖေ့ကျောင်း, 2016)
- Thike Ka Lar Tal Sakar Ma Pyaw Buu (သိုက်ကလာတယ် စကားမပြောဘူး, 2017)
- Tay Tay Lay Pal Lar A Kyi Kyi Lar (သေးသေးလေးပဲလား အကြီးကြီးလား)
- The Beginning (short, 2022)
- The Way (short, 2023)
- Broken Dreams: Stories from the Myanmar Coup (segment "Dark Tangle", 2023)

=== Film ===
Over 100 films, including:

- Nay Ta Chan La Ta Chan (နေတစ်ခြမ်းလတစ်ခြမ်း) (2006

== Television ==
- Myanmar's Got Talent

== Theatre ==
- Jesus of Nazareth: The Musical (2013)

== Discography ==
=== Solo albums ===
- Tain Twe Nay Tae Ayet (တိမ်တွေနေတဲ့အရပ်) (2010)
- Promise (ကတိ) (2019)

=== Duet albums ===
- Tho...Phay Phay Nae May May (သို့...ဖေဖေနဲ့မေမေ) (2000)
- Ta Shite Mat Mat (တရှိုက်မတ်မတ်) (2006)
- Mee Eain Ka Byar (မီးအိမ်ကဗျာ) (2014)
