= L Khun Yi =

L Khun Yi အယ်လ်ခွန်းရီ
- Birth name: Lazum Khun Yi
- Genres: Burmese pop
- Occupation(s): singer, actress
- Years active: mid-1970s to mid-1980s

Lazum Khun Yi, better known as L Khun Yi (Burmese: အယ်လ်ခွန်းရီ, pronounced [ɛ̀l kʰʊ́ɰ̃ jì]), is a Burmese singer, and is considered one of the pioneers of modern Burmese pop music. The ethnic Kachin singer of the Lazum clan was known for her Burmese language covers of 1970s Western pop songs, particularly ABBA songs. Many of her popular songs of the era were again covered by successive generations of singers like May Sweet, Tun Eindra Bo, and Yadanar Oo.

She was born to Lazum Khun Hpan, a brigadier general in the Burmese army, and Nyunt Nyunt Ma, a schoolteacher, and is the eldest of six brothers and sisters. She was attending the Rangoon Institute of Education when she began singing, attracting the interest of Burmese entertainers like Playboy Than Naing. However, she went on to finish her degree, graduating with a bachelor's in education and working as a schoolteacher in Meiktila thereafter. L Khun Yi only debuted after getting married, as her father had requested.

Her father was assassinated in a roadside ambush by the Kachin Independence Army in 1985.

She is an aunt of popular singers L Seng Zi and L Lun War.

== Album discography ==
L Khun Yi covered a variety of songs, including Western, Indian, and Chinese songs. The following is a partial list of her albums.

=== Solo albums ===
- Lay Yin Pyan 2 လေယာဉ်ပျံ ၂ (1981)
- Shwe Oh Yaung Nway A Chit ရွှေအိုရောင်နွေအချစ် (1981)
- Video ဗွီဒီယို (1982)
- Shwe Pite San ရွှေပိုက်ဆံ (1984)
- Cleopatra ကလီယိုပါထရာ (1984)
- Lan Shaut Ko Ko လမ်းလျှောက်ကိုကို (1985)
- La Sandar Zat Lite Maung လစန္ဒာဇာတ်လိုက်မောင် (1986)
- Kabar Hlae Chit Thu ကမ္ဘာလှည့်ချစ်သူ (1987)
- Min Sone Pyat မင်းဆုံးဖြတ် (1987)
- A Kaung Sone Tay Myar အကောင်းဆုံးတေးများ (1989)

=== With other artists ===
- A Way Pyay (+ University Aye Maung) အဝေးပြေး (+ တက္ကသိုလ်အေးမောင်) (1980)
- A Myan Yin (+ Playboy Than Naing) အမြန်ယာဉ် (+ ပလေးဘွိုင်သန်းနိုင်) (1981)
- Sein Ta Yit Mya Ta Yit (+ Sein Lwin) စိန်တစ်ရစ် မြတစ်ရစ် (+ စိန်လွင်) (1982)
- A Myan Yin 2 (+ Playboy Than Naing) အမြန်ယာဉ် ၂ (+ ပလေးဘွိုင်သန်းနိုင်) (1982)
- Yangon Hmar Thar Tae La (+ Sai Htee Saing) ရန်ကုန်မှာသာတဲ့လ (+ စိုင်းထီးဆိုင်) (1982)
- A Hnay Yin (+ Playboy Than Naing) အနှေးယာဉ် (+ ပလေးဘွိုင်သန်းနိုင်) (1983)
- Set Kyar Wara Nae Pyaing Pwel (+ Playboy Than Naing) စကြဝဠာနဲ့ပြိုင်ပွဲ (+ ပလေးဘွိုင်သန်းနိုင်) (1983)
- Chit Kyoe Khway (+ Aung Ko Latt) ချစ်ကြိုးခွေ (+ အောင်ကိုလတ်) (1983)
- Lu Soe (+ Playboy Than Naing & Pearl) လူဆိုး (+ ပလေးဘွိုင်သန်းနိုင် ၊ ပုလဲ) (1983)
- A Chit Ma Shi Ngar (+ Eh Thein Htun) အချစ်မရှိငါ (+ အယ်သိန်းထွန်း) (1984)
- A Myan Yin Chit Thu Myar (+ Playboy Than Naing) အမြန်ယာဉ်ချစ်သူများ (+ ပလေးဘွိုင်သန်းနိုင်) (1991)
- Shwe Yaung Thachin Myar ရွှေရောင်သီချင်းများ (2001)
- Mate Tot Ma Mate Thay Buu (Live Show) မေ့တော့မမေ့သေးဘူး Live Show (2001)
- Ah Chit Eain Met (Live Show) (+ Playboy Than Naing) အချစ်အိပ်မက် Live Show (+ ပလေးဘွိုင်သန်းနိုင်) (2002)
