= Myanmar's Got Talent =

Burmese Talent show

- Genre: Interactive talent competition
- Created by: Simon Cowell
- Based on: Got Talent franchise
- Presented by: Soe Htun Win; Tay Zar Kyaw
- Judges: Moht Moht Myint Aung; A Yoe; Maung Thi; Rebecca Win; Myo Gyi; Nay Nay; Mg Mg Aye; Chit Thu Wai; Khine Thin Kyi
- Country of origin: Myanmar
- Original language: Burmese (main language)
- No. of seasons: 6

Production
- Production locations: Auditions: Mawlamyine; Mandalay; Yangon; Semifinals: Yangon; Finals: Yangon
- Camera setup: multi-camera setup
- Production company: Forever Bec-Tero

Original release
- Network: MRTV-4
- Release: September 28, 2014 – present

Related
- Asia's Got Talent; Got Talent; America's Got Talent

Myanmar's Got Talent (MGT) is the Burmese version of the Got Talent franchise that is airing on MRTV-4. It is a talent show that features singers, dancers, magicians, comedians, and other performers of all ages competing for a prize. It has been broadcasting since 2014 and is now reaching its sixth season. The talent show was listed in The Myanmar Times "Top 10 Myanmar TV Shows" in 2019.

== Season overview ==
The first season of the show was hosted by Tay Zar Kyaw and Soe Htun Win; while the judges are Maung Thi, Moht Moht Myint Aung and A Yoe. At the season finale, Wai Yan Naing (danger magician) won the first season in 2014.

The second season of the show was hosted by Tay Zar Kyaw and Soe Htun Win; while the judges are Maung Thi, Moht Moht Myint Aung, A Yoe and new judge Rebecca Win. At the season finale, Jar Jet Aung (13-year-old robot dancer) won the second season in 2015.

The third season of the show was hosted by Tay Zar Kyaw and Soe Htun Win; while the judges are Maung Thi, Rebecca Win, Moht Moht Myint Aung and new judge Myo Gyi. At the season finale, Jimmy Ko Ko (23-year-old contemporary dancer) won the third season in 2016.

The fourth season of the show was hosted by Tay Zar Kyaw and Soe Htun Win; while the judges are Maung Thi, Moht Moht Myint Aung and two new judges, Nay Nay and Mg Mg Aye. At the season finale, Ayar Maung (traditional elephant dancing team) won the fourth season in 2017.

The fifth season of the show was hosted by Tay Zar Kyaw and Soe Htun Win; while the judges are Maung Thi, Moht Moht Myint Aung, Mg Mg Aye and new judge Chit Thu Wai. At the season finale, Junior Creative Dance, a shadowplay group, won the fifth season in 2018.

The sixth season of the show was hosted by Tay Zar Kyaw and Soe Htun Win; while the judges are Maung Thi, Moht Moht Myint Aung, Mg Mg Aye and new judge Khine Thin Kyi. At the season finale, Phone Myat Min (acrobat), five years old young boy won the sixth season in 2019 and the youngest winner in MGT.

== Judges ==
Current

Maung Thi (1–)

Moht Moht Myint Aung (1–)

Khine Thin Kyi (6–)

Mg Mg Aye (4–)

Former

A Yoe (1–2)

Rebecca Win (2–3)

Myo Gyi (3)

Nay Nay (4)

Chit Thu Wai (5)

== Winners ==
- Season 1 winner (2014) – Wai Yan Naing (danger magician)
- Season 2 winner (2015) – Jar Jet Aung (13-year-old robot dancer)
- Season 3 winner (2016) – Jimmy Ko Ko (23-year-old contemporary dancer)
- Season 4 winner (2017) – Ayar Maung (traditional elephant dancing team)
- Season 5 winner (2018) – Junior Creative Dance (shadowplay group)
- Season 6 winner (2019) – Phone Myat Min (5-year-old acrobat)
