= Mg Mg Aye =

Burmese television host and MC

- မောင်မောင်အေး
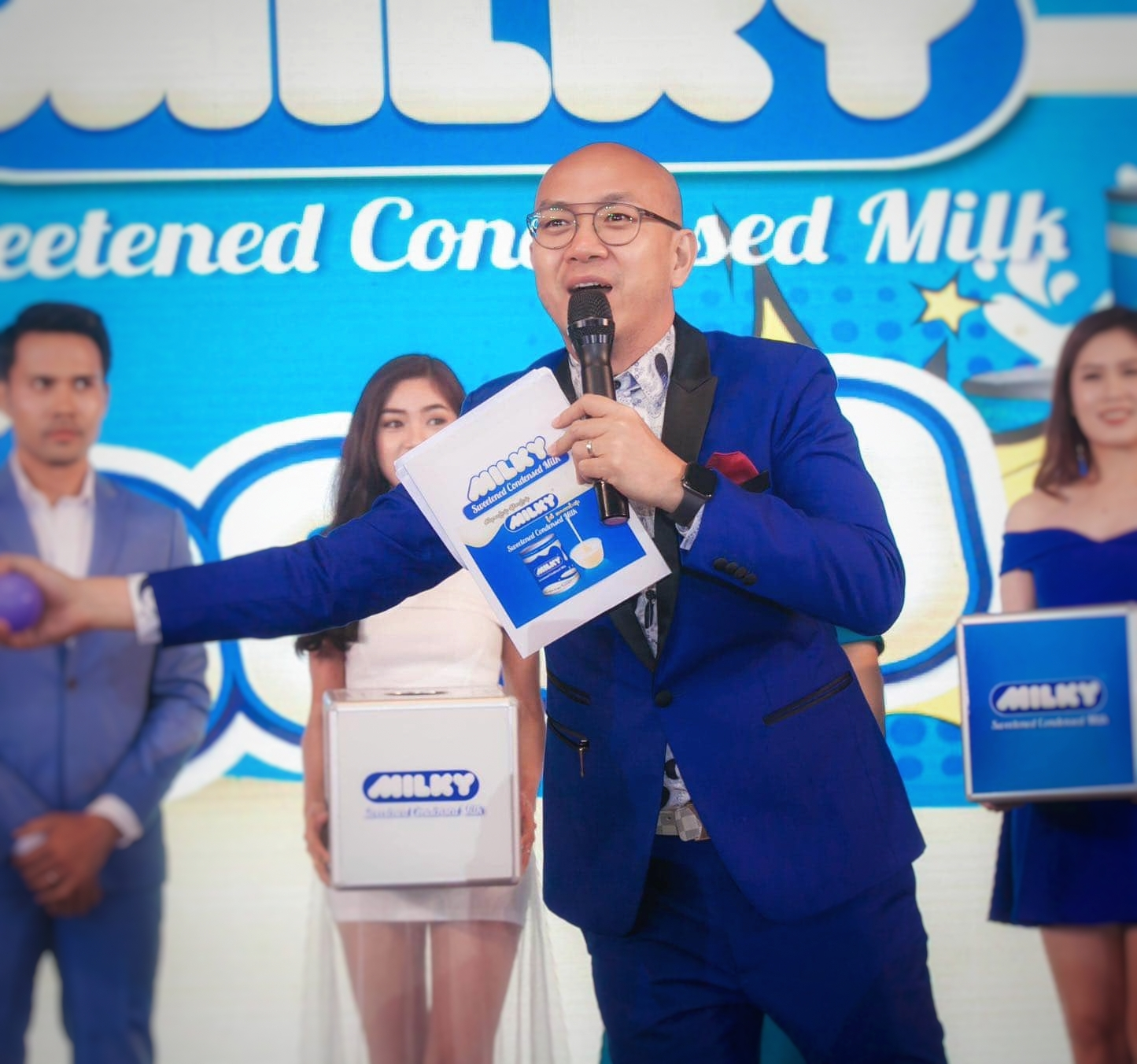
- Mg Mg Aye in 2019
- Born: Mg Mg Aye; 29 June 1978 (age 48); Yangon, Burma
- Education: Dagon University
- Years active: 2008–present

Mg Mg Aye (Burmese: မောင်မောင်အေး; also spelt Maung Maung Aye; born 29 June 1978) is a Burmese television host and MC. He has been the host for several Burmese TV programs and received acceptance of audience for the reality game show Puzzle Palace. Mg Mg Aye was a judge on Myanmar's Got Talent. He is the founder of Myanmar's first entertainment and game company, Dream Boat Entertainment. Mg Mg Aye is also active as a philanthropist with the notable charitable organization We Love Yangon.

A core supporter of the National League for Democracy, he actively participated in the election campaign in November, 2015.

On 1 February 2021, the military attempted to arrest Mg Mg Aye during the coup, but have been unsuccessful.

On 13 February 2021, in the aftermath of the 2021 Myanmar coup d'état, Mg Mg Aye and six other high profile individuals, namely Min Ko Naing, Kyaw Min Yu, Myo Yan Naung Thein, Insein Aung Soe, Pencilo, and Lynn Lynn were charged and issued arrest warrants under section 505 (b) of the Myanmar Penal Code by the State Administration Council for inciting unrest against the state and threatening "public tranquility" through their social media posts.

He eventually fled to the United States as a political refugee. On 17 February 2022, his homes and business property were confiscated by the military council.

== Television show ==
- Puzzle Palace
- Myanmar's Got Talent
