= Pencilo =

Burmese writer and activist

- ပန်ဆယ်လို

Personal details
- Born: Eaint Poe Ou; 15 April 1990 (age 36) Myaungmya, Myanmar
- Party: National League for Democracy
- Education: Dagon University
- Occupation: Writer, pro-democracy activist

Pencilo (Burmese: ပန်ဆယ်လို; born Eaint Poe Ou (Burmese: အိမ့်ပိုးဥ), on 14 April 1990) is a Burmese writer and pro-democracy activist. She is best known for criticizing the Tatmadaw and taking up politically sensitive cases against the Burmese military junta and generals.

== Early life and education ==
Pencilo was born on 14 April 1990 in Myaungmya, Ayeyarwady Region, Myanmar. She graduated with B.Sc. in Industrial Chemistry from Dagon University in 2011.

== Career and activism ==
Pencilo has written posts criticizing the military and the former military-backed government of President Thein Sein, which have occasionally come under fire. A core supporter of the National League for Democracy, she participated in the election campaign in November 2015.

She began her literary career in 2016, publishing a book titled Under The Mask (မျက်နှာဖုံးတွေရဲ့အောက်). The book became one of the best-selling books of 2016.

She joined the campaign supporting Aung San Suu Kyi's defense of Myanmar against genocide charges related to the Rohingya crisis at the UN's top court in The Hague in December 2019.

=== Lawsuit ===
In 2017, she was sued for writing posts on her Facebook account critical of Myanmar military commander-in-chief Senior General Min Aung Hlaing and rabble-rousing Buddhist monk Wirathu, and about an attack on Buddhist Abbot Ein Daka at a restaurant in Yangon. She was charged under Section 66 (d) of the telecommunications law, which outlaws online defamation and carries a maximum two-year jail sentence. On 12 September 2020, the Tamwe Township Court ruled that Pencilo was not guilty of violating Section 66 (d) of the telecommunications law. Khin Maung Myint, a legal consultant, said about Pancilo's lawsuit case to Radio Free Asia:

"The ruling in Pencilo's case is the flicker of hope for all people and cases charged under Section 66(d)."

=== 2021 Myanmar coup d'état ===
On 1 February 2021, the military attempted to arrest Pencilo during the coup, but was unsuccessful.

On 13 February 2021, in the aftermath of the 2021 Myanmar coup d'état, Pencilo, along with six other high-profile individuals, Min Ko Naing, Kyaw Min Yu, Mg Mg Aye, Insein Aung Soe, and Lynn Lynn were charged and issued arrest warrants under Section 505 (b) of the Myanmar Penal Code by the State Administration Council for inciting unrest against the state and threatening "public tranquility" through their social media posts.

Pencilo became one of the main targets of the military junta. She escaped Yangon to Thailand afterwards, and eventually fled to the United States as a political refugee. As a result of fleeing Myanmar, Pencilo has consistently kept a record of everything she has done since fleeing, and she described those 100 days of refuge as "a nightmare". While running away from military arrest, Pencilo led campaigns on social media to mobilize pro-democracy demonstrations.

Her first translation work into Korean, "Burma Spring Revolution" was published in February 2022, and recounts her escape, the democratic uprising, and the resistance of the Myanmar people. The book became a bestseller in South Korea.

On 17 February 2022, her homes and business property were confiscated by the military council. On 4 March, the military council announced that her citizenship had been terminated. On 25 December 2022, she received the Kim Geun Tae Foundation Democracy Award. This is the first time the Kim Geun Tae Foundation has given the Democracy Award to a non-Korean. She donated the 10 million won (US$7,800) prize money to support democracy movements in Myanmar.

Former South Korean President Moon Jae-in showed support for Myanmar's democracy by posing with Pancilo's book "Burma Spring Revolution", as recommended by a Burmese student in South Korea.

Pencilo plays a crucial role as a key fundraiser for NUG and PDF. In March 2022, she spearheaded the major fundraising campaign called "Project Dragonfly", aimed to provide anti-aircraft weapons for NUG. The project was a huge success, mainly driven by people's desire to equip resistance forces with weapons to stop ongoing bombardments from air force, received over US$2 million. In March 2023, NUG's Ministry of Defense announced that it has been using US$1.4 million and US$800,000 for air-defense and anti-aircraft operations respectively. In March 2023, she launched Rangoon Grocery Market in Sacramento, U.S., drawing both criticism from Burmese people and military backers. Accusations surfaced, linking the opening of the mini market to the alleged misuse of funds from "Project Dragonfly". Part of these criticisms came from the ground forces, many of which denied that they have not received any anti-aircraft weapons from NUG although the crowdfunding campaign was succeed over 2 times its targeted amount.

In January 2024, she faced severe criticism from the Myanmar political community for purchasing a substantial residence at 6369 Garland Way, Roseville, California, valued at one million dollars, just two years after resettling in the United States. Many accused her of misusing political funding obtained through donations. However, she denied all accusations and clarified that the purchase was facilitated through a credit loan.

In June 2025, the military council announced that purchasing or distributing products linked to Pencilo and other anti-junta activists abroad would be considered a criminal offense.

== Works ==
- မျက်နှာဖုံးတွေရဲ့အောက် (June 2016)
- အဇ္စျတ္တကောက်ကြောင်း (Feb 2017)
- ရေသောက်မြစ်ကို တူးဖော်ခြင်း (July 2017)
- ကြယ်ဝင်ရိုးစွန်းပေါ်ကလူ (March 2018)
- Burma Spring Revolution (2022)
