= Yadanar Oo =

Burmese singer

- ရတနာဦး
- Born: Yadanar Oo; Myanmar
- Occupation: Singer-songwriter
- Musical career
- Genres: Pop
- Instruments: Vocals

Yadanar Oo (Burmese: ရတနာဦး) is a Burmese singer.

== Music career ==
A live show, titled From A Distance, was held on March 6, 2016, at Gandamar Hotel in Yangon with singers May Sweet and Mimi Win Pe.

== Discography ==
=== Albums ===
- Sie Taw Gyi (စည်တော်ကြီး)
- Myat Noe Thu (မြတ်နိုးသူ)
- Chit Thu (2014)
- Hlaine See Yin Thachinnsomaal

=== Collaborative albums ===
- From A Distance (2012 and 2016 Live Show)
- Chee Moon Chin Mha Ta Par (2018)
