= L Seng Zi =

Burmese singer of Kachin descent

- Lဆိုင်းဇီ
- Occupation: Singer

L Seng Zi (Burmese: Lဆိုင်းဇီ; also spelt L Saing Zi or L Sai Zi; born on October 22, 1986) is a Burmese singer of Kachin descent. Her aunt L Khun Yi and her cousin L Lun Wa are also popular singers.

== Discography ==
- Incomparable Gratitudes (အနှိုင်းမဲ့ကျေးဇူးတော်) (2017)
- Obsessed (အစွဲအလန်းကြီးသူ) (2017)
- Wai Khwal Ma Ya Par Lar (2017)
- Moe Kaung Kin Kha Yee (2019)

== Filmography ==
=== Film ===
Year	Title	Burmese title	Role	Director	Note(s)	Ref(s).
2023	A Red Blanket	စောင်နီလေးတစ်ထည်		Tin Aung Soe		
