= L Lun Wa =

Burmese pop singer of Kachin descent (born 1983)

L Lun Wah Lလွန်းဝါ
- Born: Lazum Lung Wah; January 26, 1983 (age 43); Burma (now Myanmar)
- Genres: Burmese pop
- Instruments: Vocals, Song Writer
- Years active: 2003-present

L Lun Wa (Burmese: Lလွန်းဝါ; also spelt L Lun War and L Loon War) is a Burmese pop singer of Kachin descent. He began pursuing a music career between the ages of 18 and 19, at the same time he was attending medical school at the University of Medicine 1, Yangon. He graduated from medical school, after a 4-year hiatus.

He was married to Khaing Su, and has two daughters, Mai Mai and Lu Lu. His aunt, L Khun Yi, was a prominent pop singer in the 1980s, while his cousin, L Seng Zi, is a pop singer.

== Discography ==
- အချစ်မျက်ဝန်း (2003)
- အဆုံးမဲ့မျှော်လင့်ချက် (2007)
- အိပ်မက်ဝတ်စုံ (2009)
- ကျနော့်ရဲ့ တေးဂီတ အဘိဓာန် (2014)
- အလိုတော်အတိုင်းပြီးပြည့်စုံသောဘဝ (2017)
