= Mon National Day =

Myanmar annual celebration by Mon people

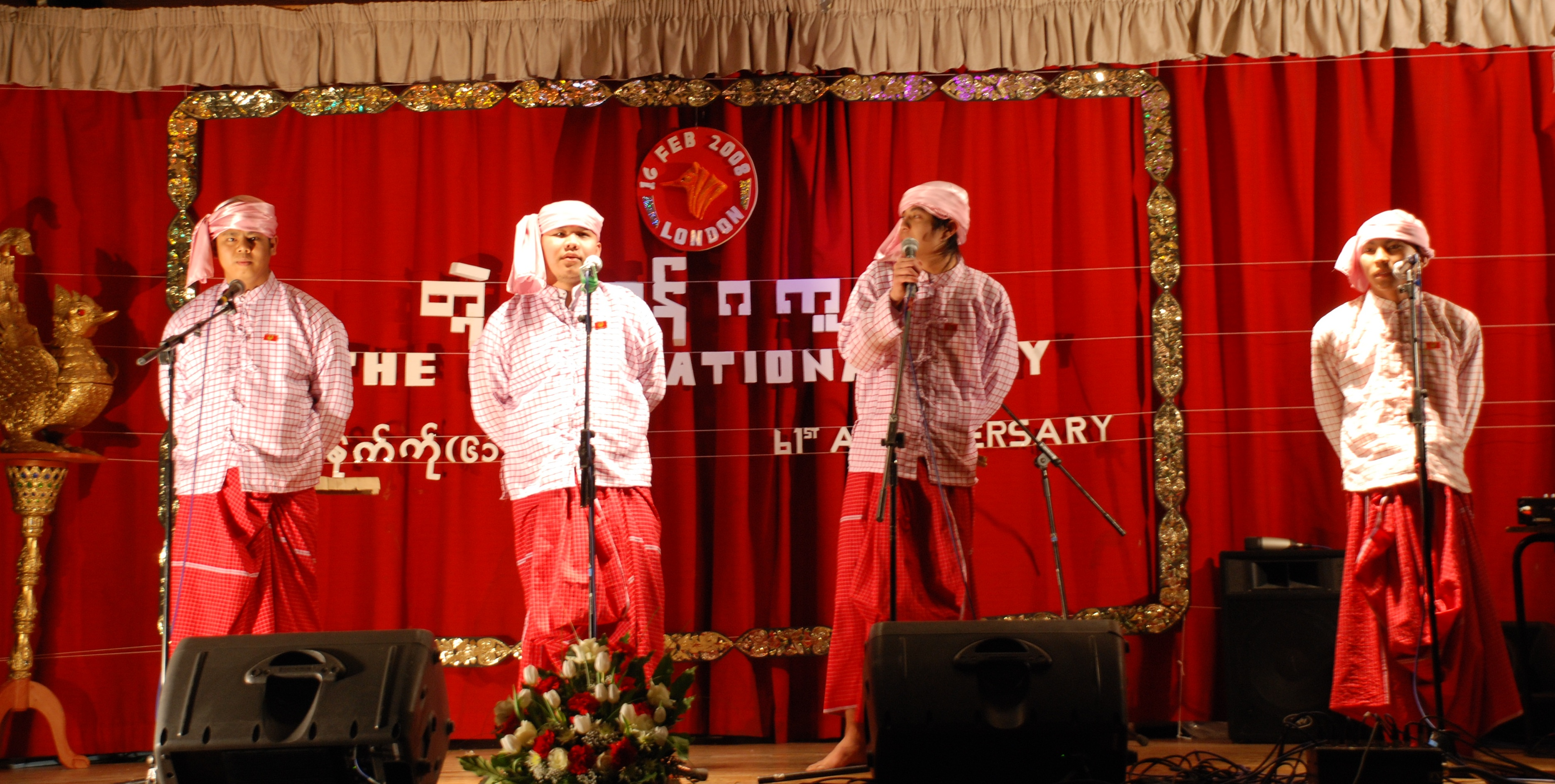
- 61st Mon National Day celebration in London
- Official name: တ္ၚဲကောန်ဂကူမန်
- Observed by: Mon people
- Type: Cultural
- Frequency: Annual
- Related to: Mon State Day

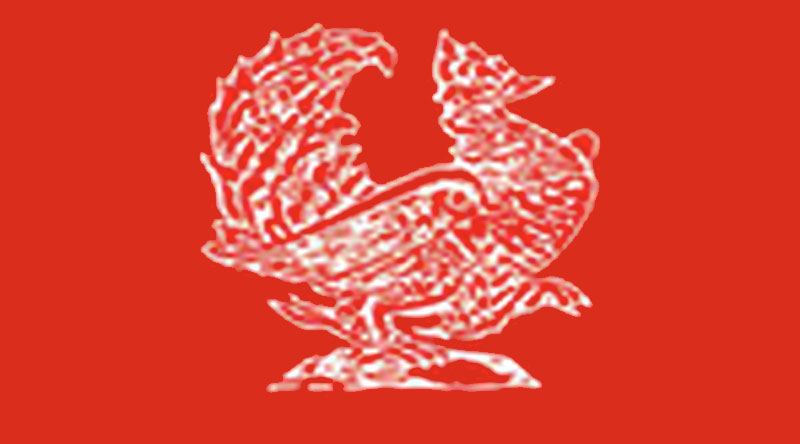
Mon flag used during the Hongsawadee Kingdom, AD 573–1757

Mon National Day (Mon: တ္ၚဲကောန်ဂကူမန်, rungmoam kaun kay kaw mon; Burmese: မွန်အမျိုးသားနေ့; Thai: วันชาติมอญ) is an annual national day that commemorates the founding of Hanthawaddy kingdom. Mon National Day is celebrated by the Mon people in Myanmar and Thailand, and by overseas Mon communities. The day is held on the first waning day of the lunar month of Tabodwe (Maik in Mon) in the Burmese calendar, following Māgha Pūjā.

== Origins ==
Mon National Day was first celebrated in 1947, marking the mythic foundation of last Mon kingdom, Hanthawaddy (now centred in Bago), in CE 573. The origins of Mon National Day parallel that of Karen New Year, as both were colonial-era celebrations that fostered the ethnic identity of these communities. The former was established by the United Mon Association via resolution, in October 1947 in the village of Kamawuk in Mudon Township.

In 1974, the Burma Socialist Programme Party-led government officially recognized Mon State Day on 19 March, to celebrate the establishment of Mon State.

Mon National Day is currently not recognized by the Burmese national government as a national holiday. However, in 2013, the Mon State Government expressed interest in organizing celebrations for the holiday. That same year, Aung San Suu Kyi, the country's de facto leader, spoke at large-scale Mon National Day celebrations held at Yangon's People's Square and Park. In 2016, activists and festivity organizers petitioned the national government to observe Mon National Day as a public holiday. Since 2017, the Mon State Government has earmarked funding for state-wide Mon National Day celebrations. In 2018, Mon and Kayin State Governments jointly earmarked funding for inaugural Mon National Day celebrations in Kayin State.

== Celebrations ==
Mon National Day is celebrated by Mon communities throughout Myanmar, primarily in Mon and Kayin States, Yangon and Taninthayi Regions. Mon National Day in Thailand was first held in Bangkok in 1982. Countries with significant Mon populations, including in Singapore, Malaysia, South Korea, also observe the occasion.

Mon National Day is marked with literature competitions, photo exhibitions, traditional boxing competitions, and traditional songs and dances performed by a popular Mon drama troupes and other cultural shows. Traditional Mon musical instruments, food and handicrafts are also sold during festivities. During the festivities, many celebrants don traditional Mon outfits, consisting of red-colored longyis and white tops.

== Gallery ==
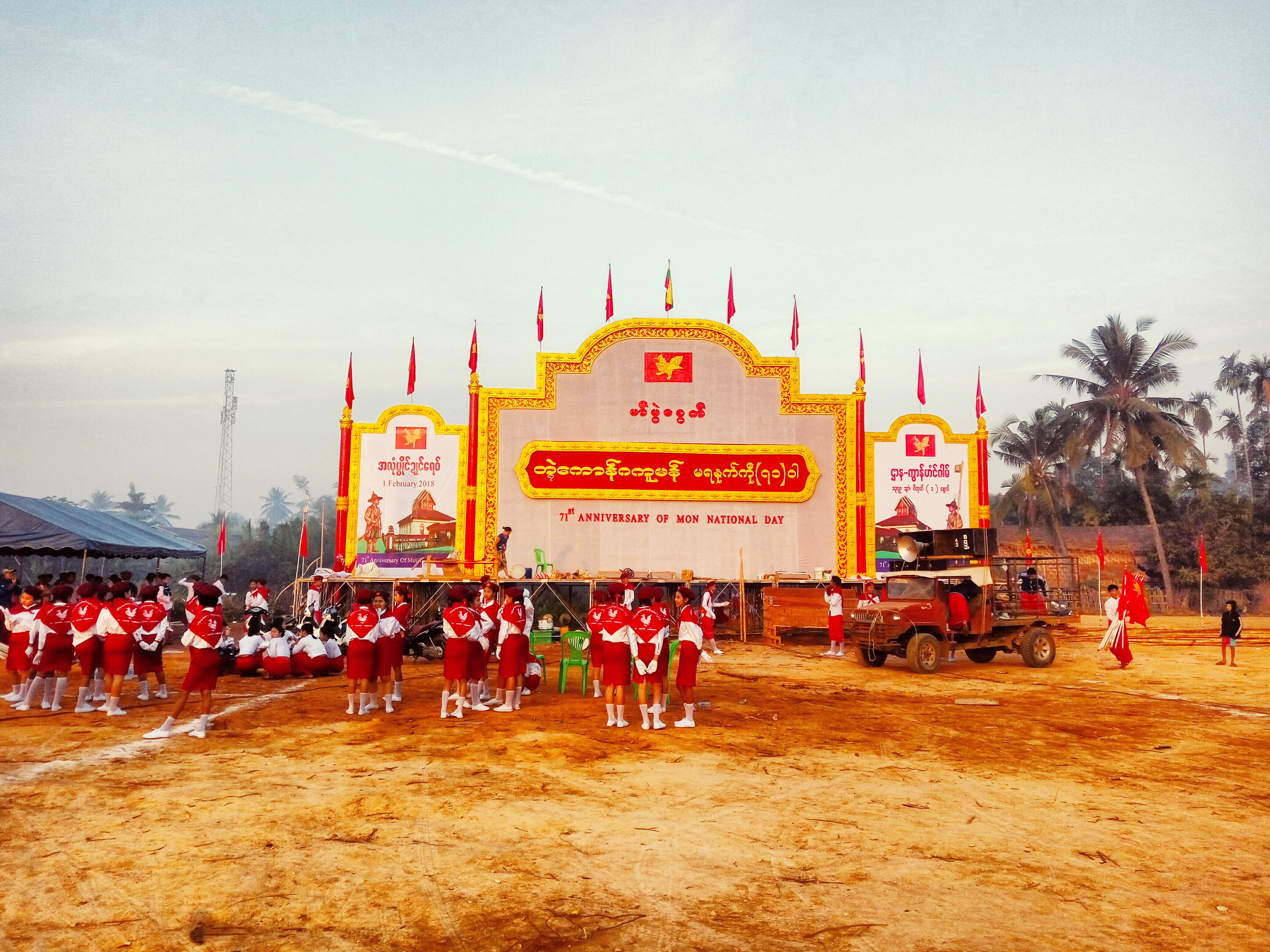

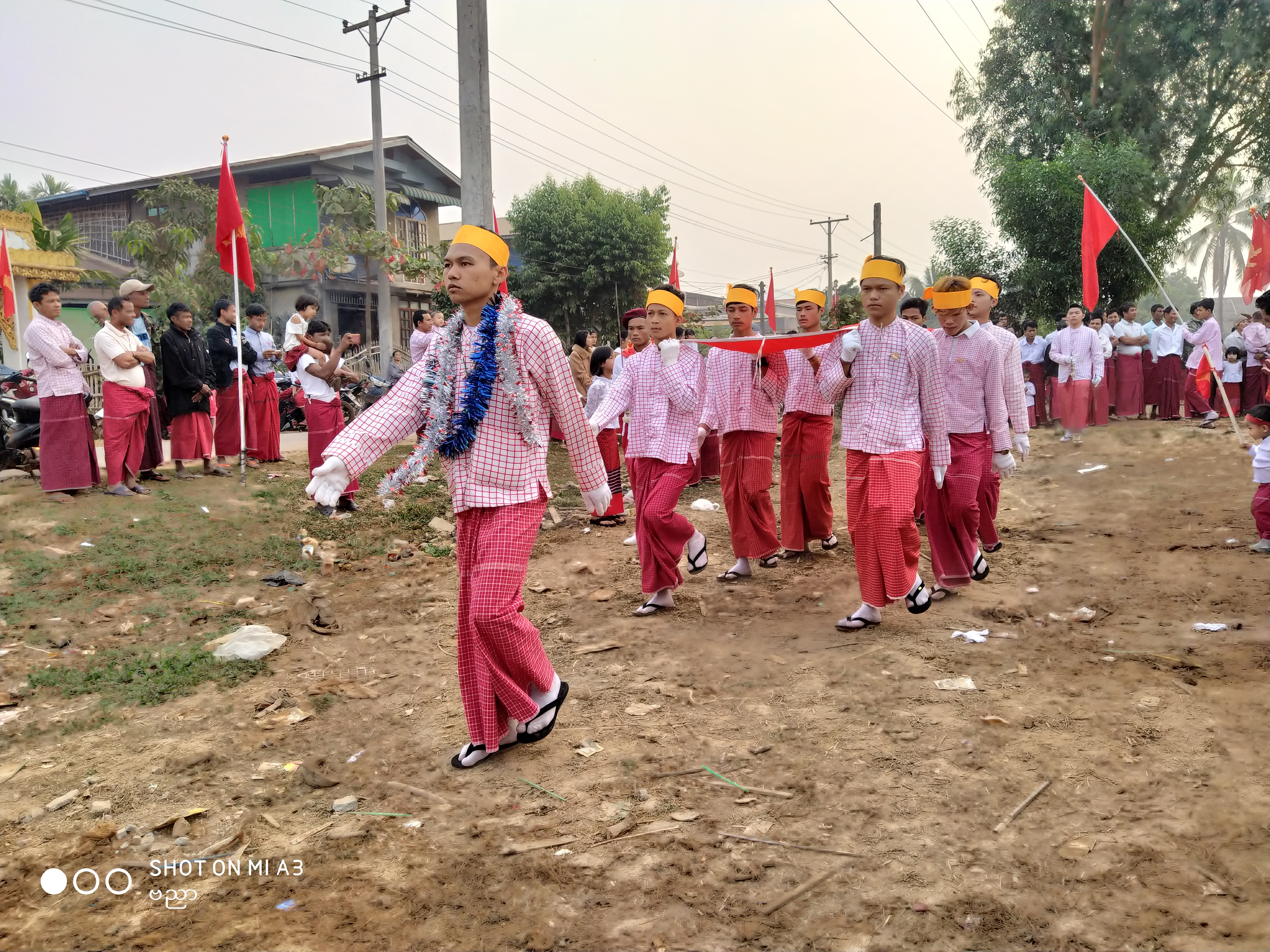

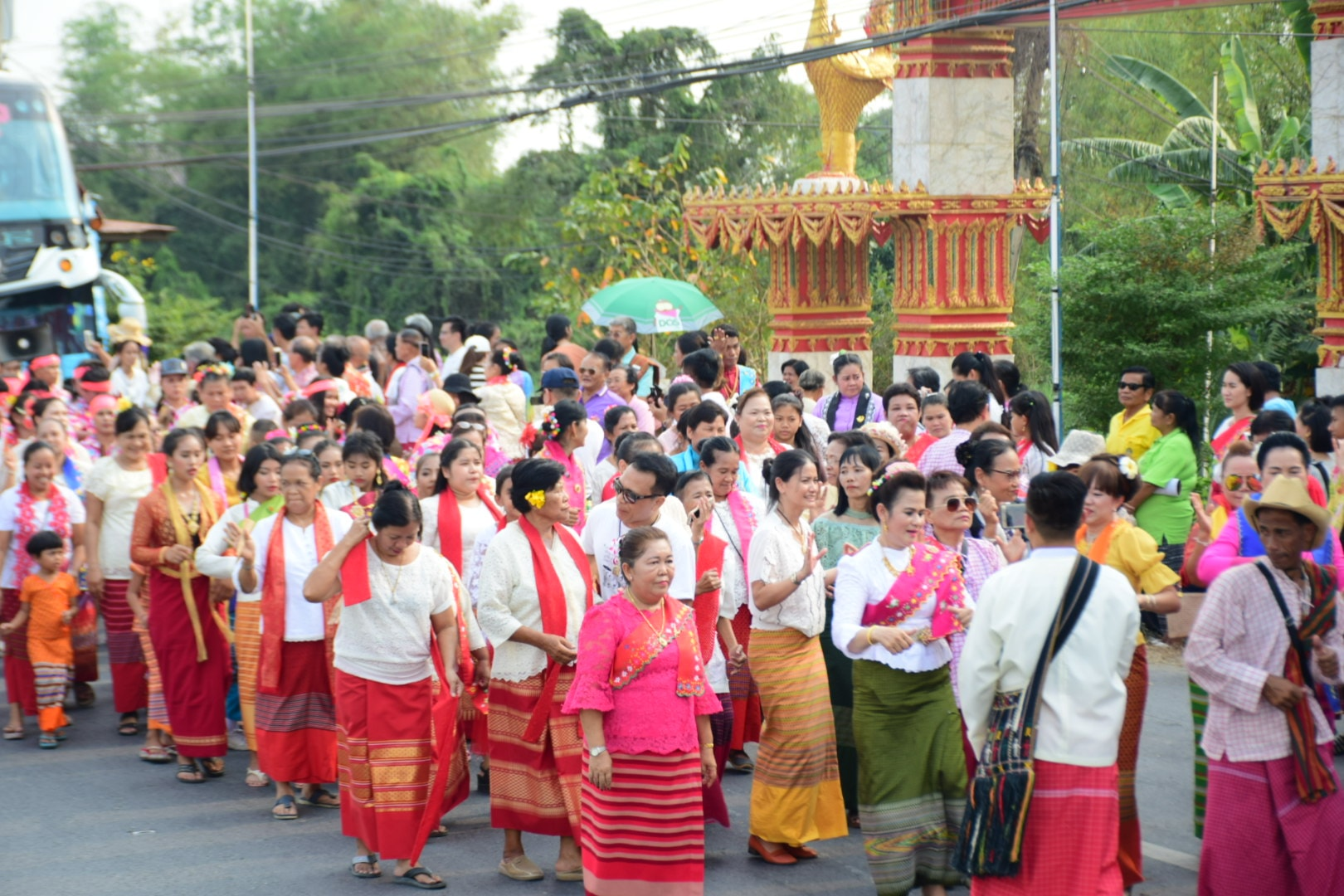

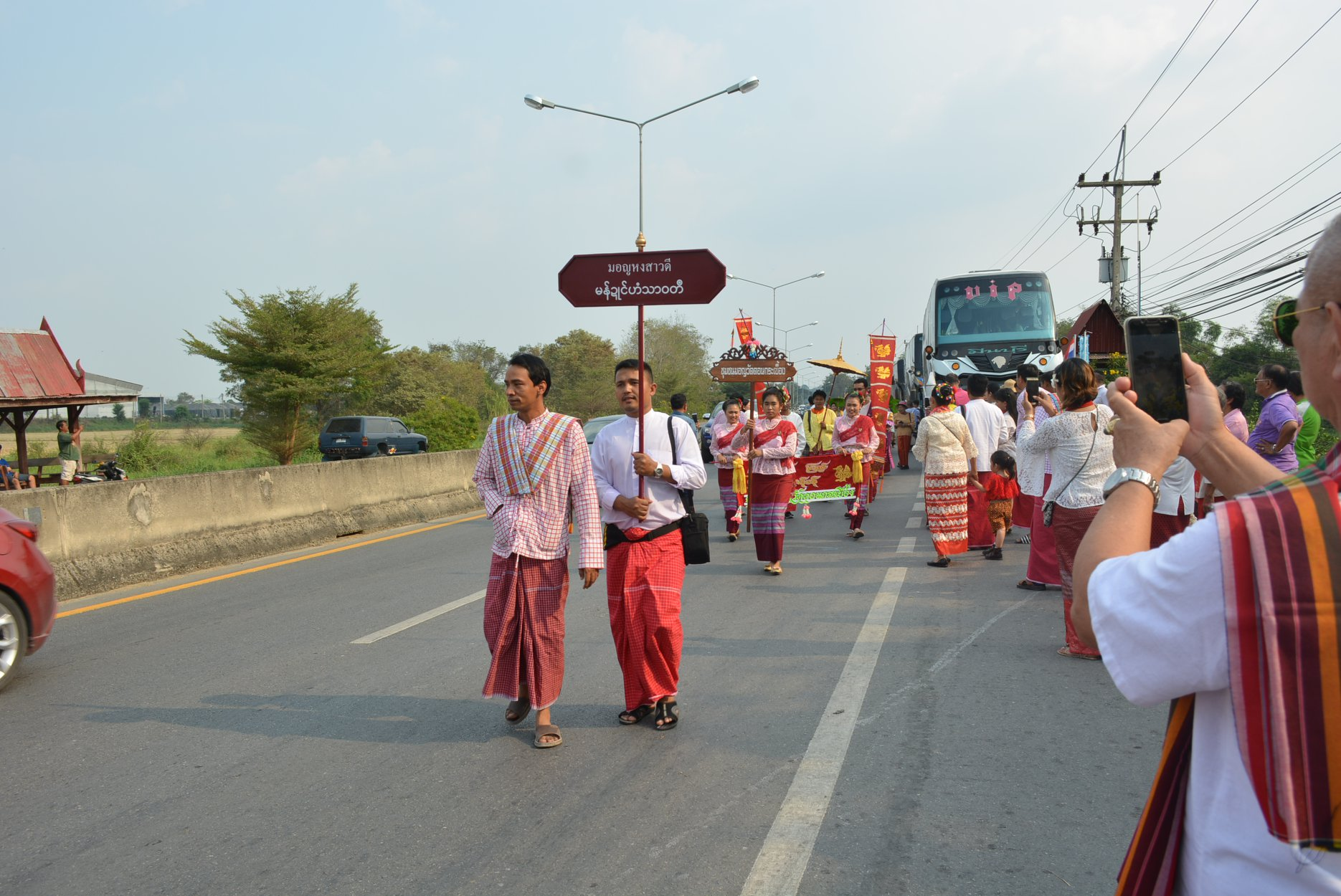

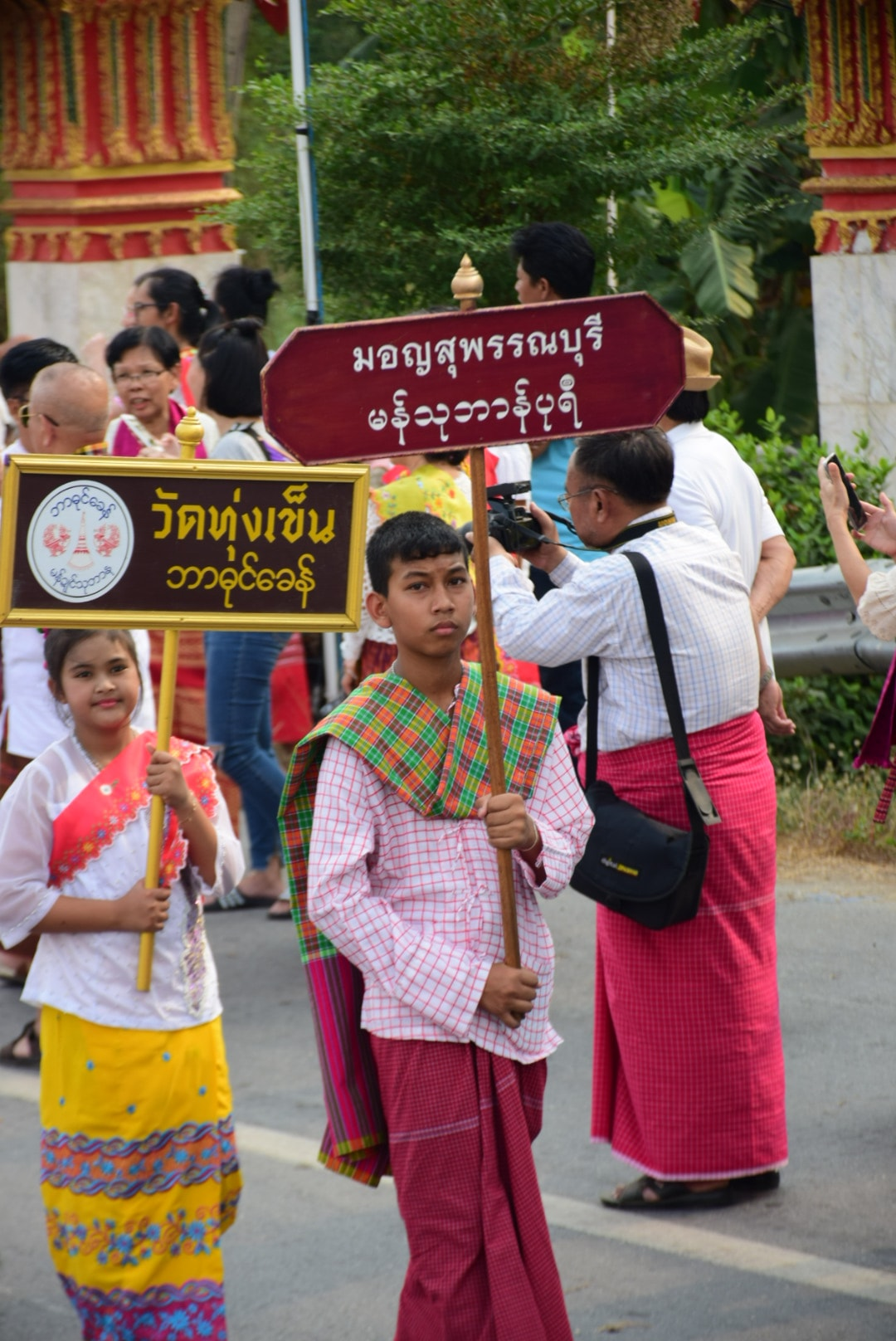

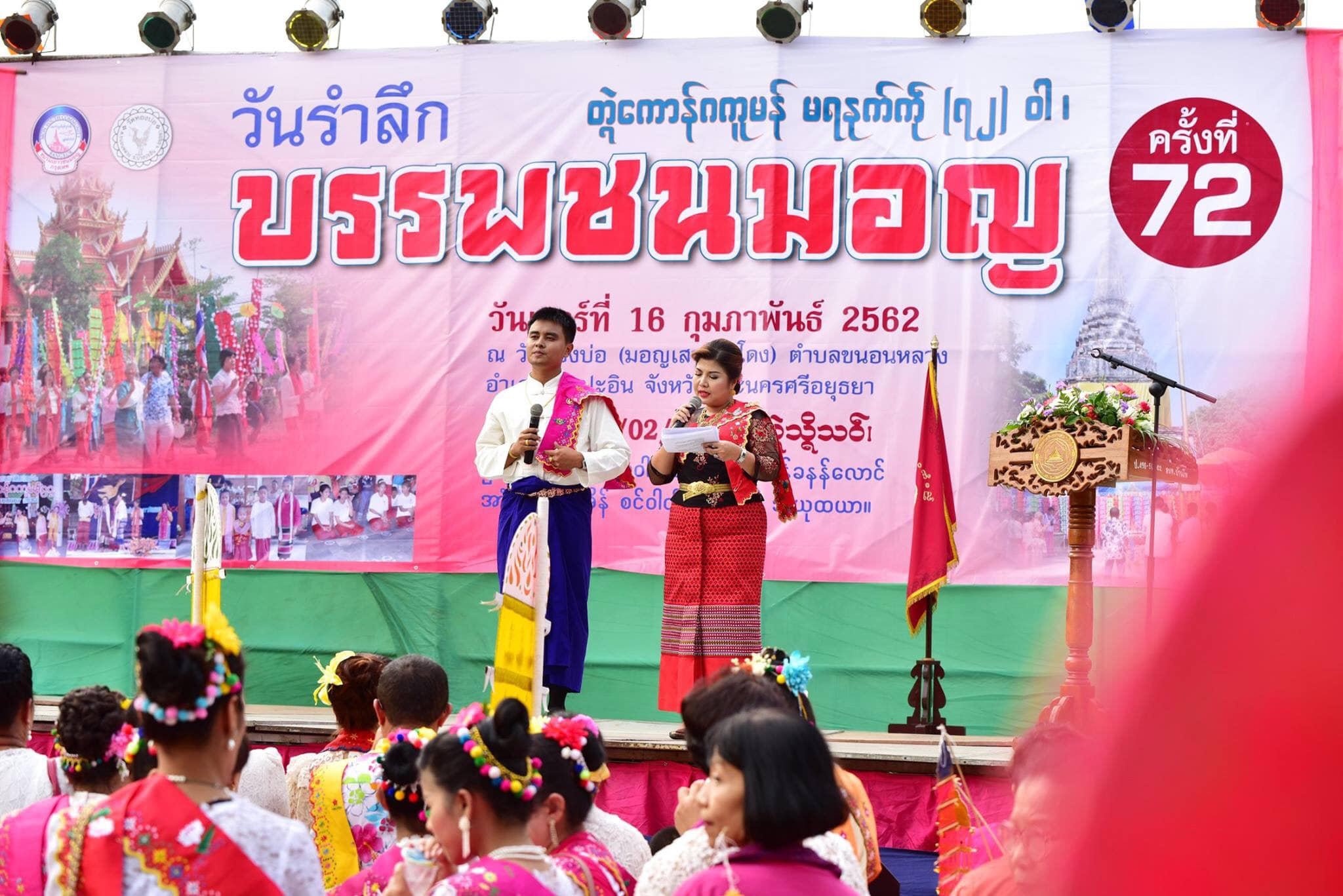

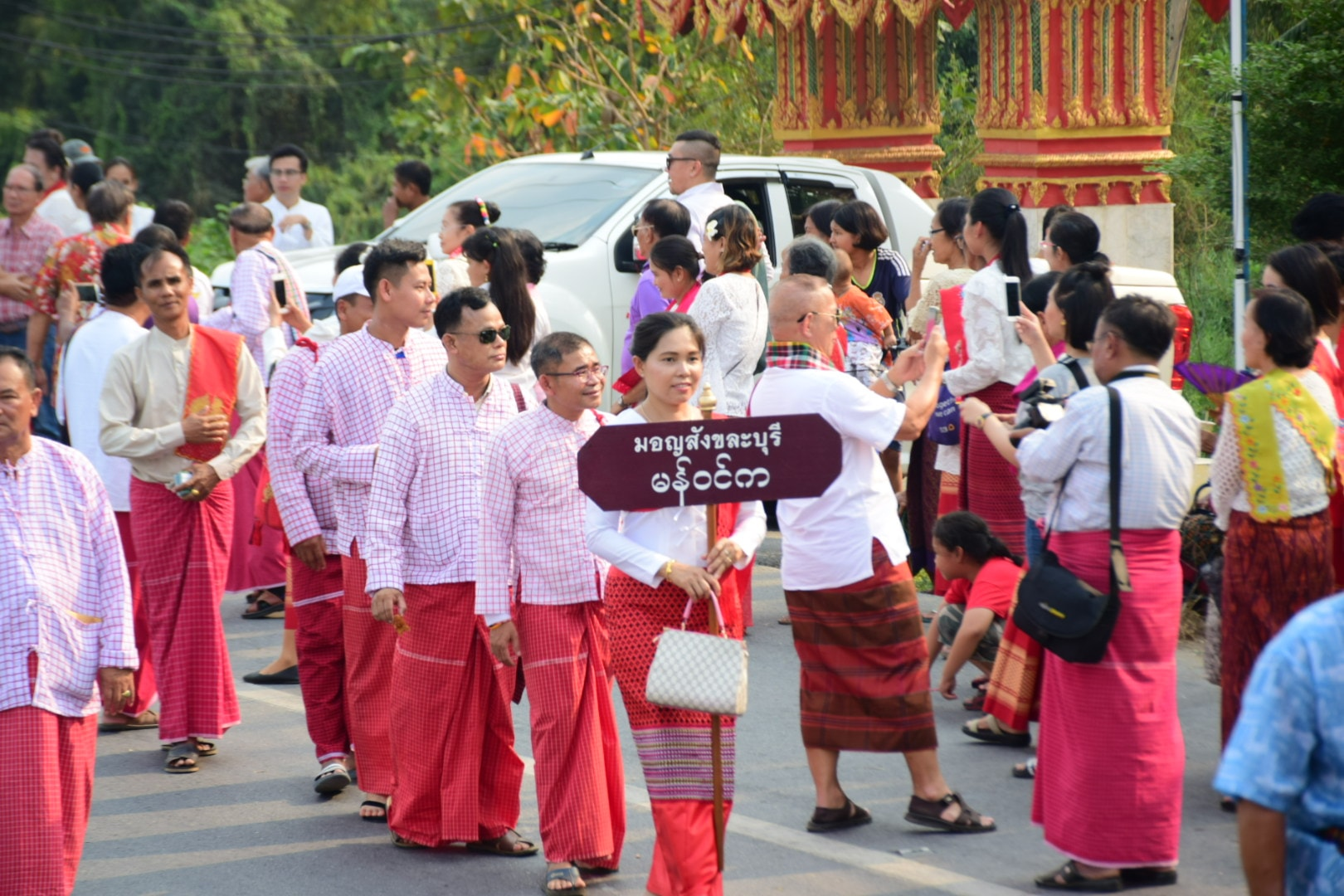

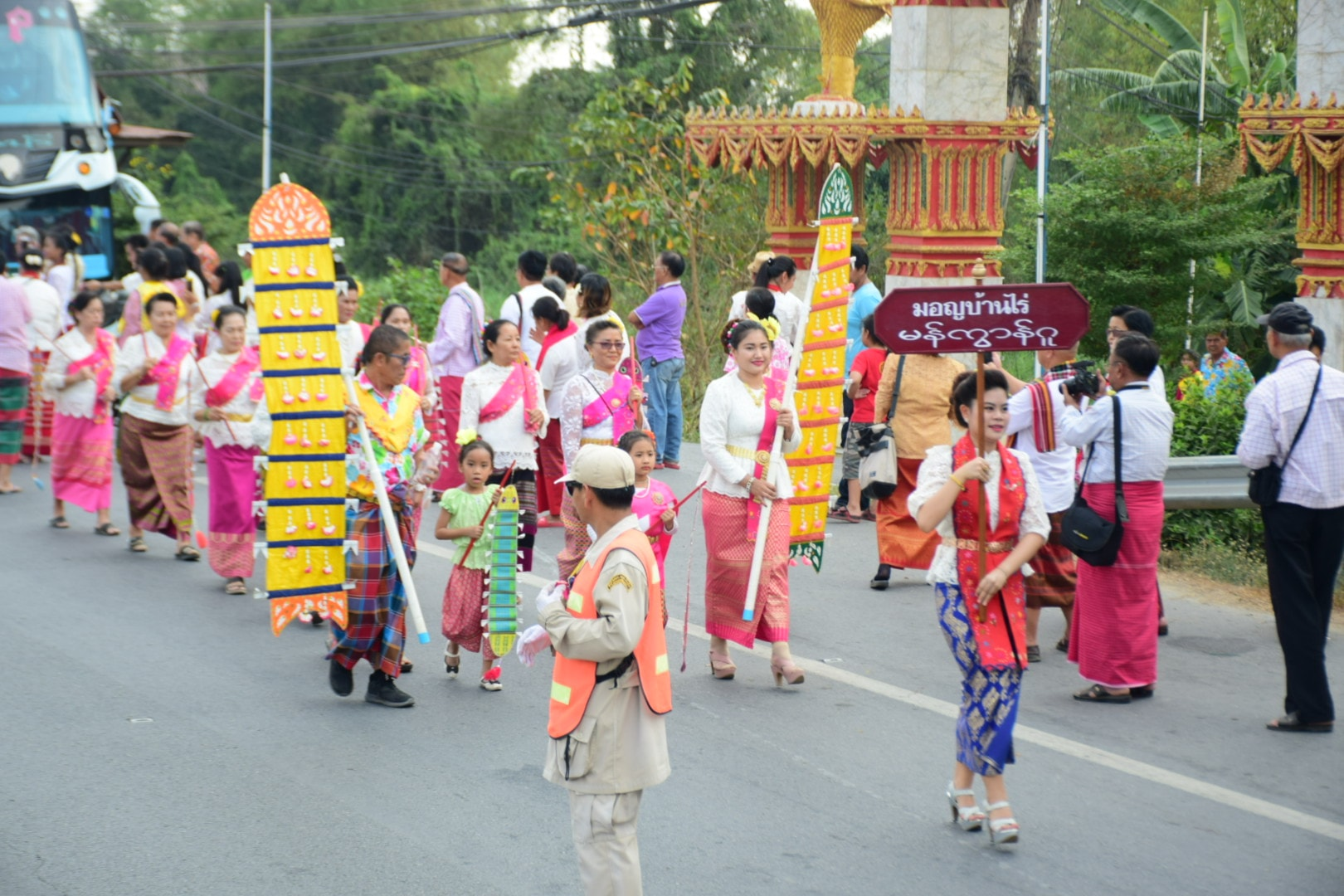

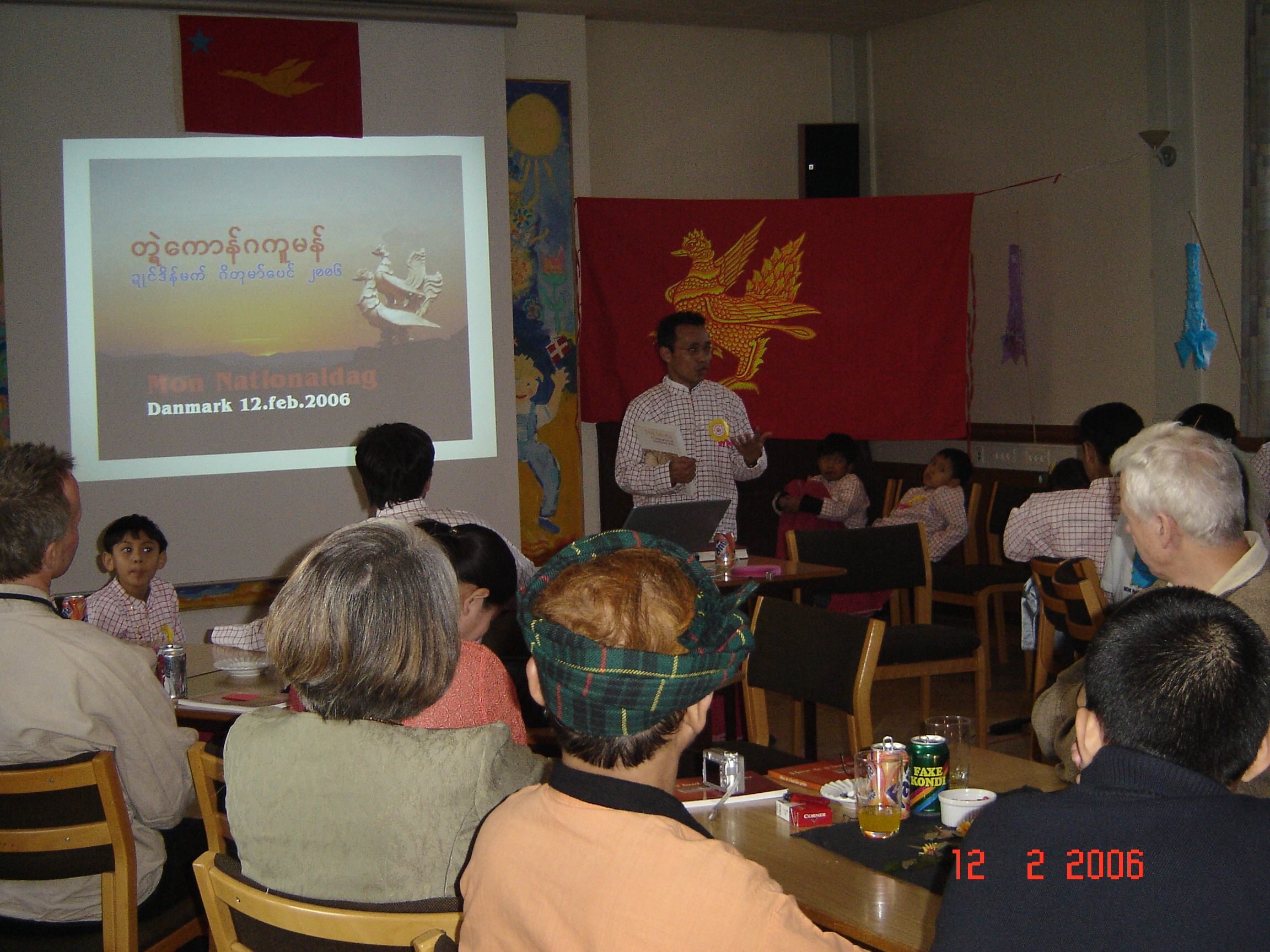

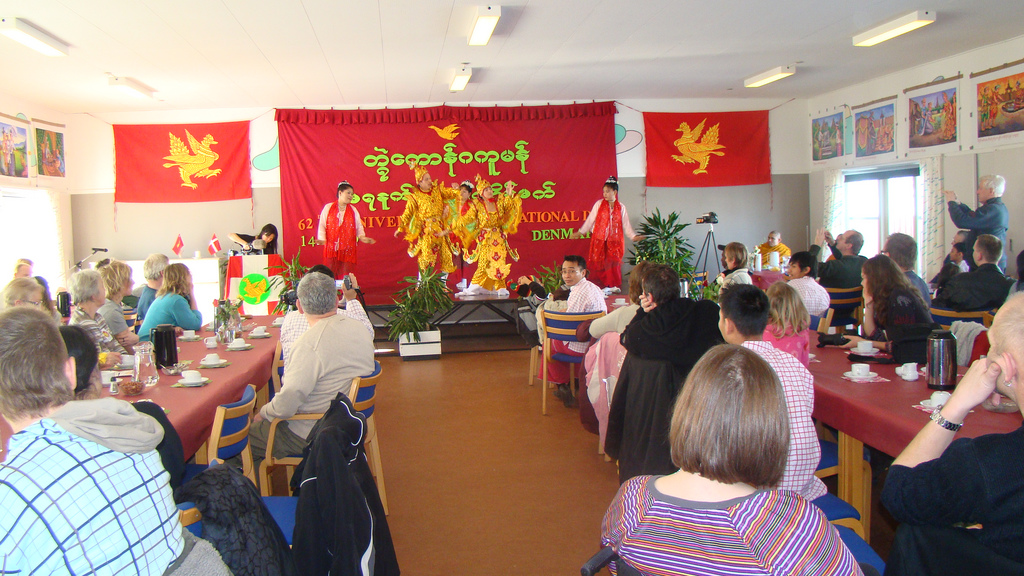

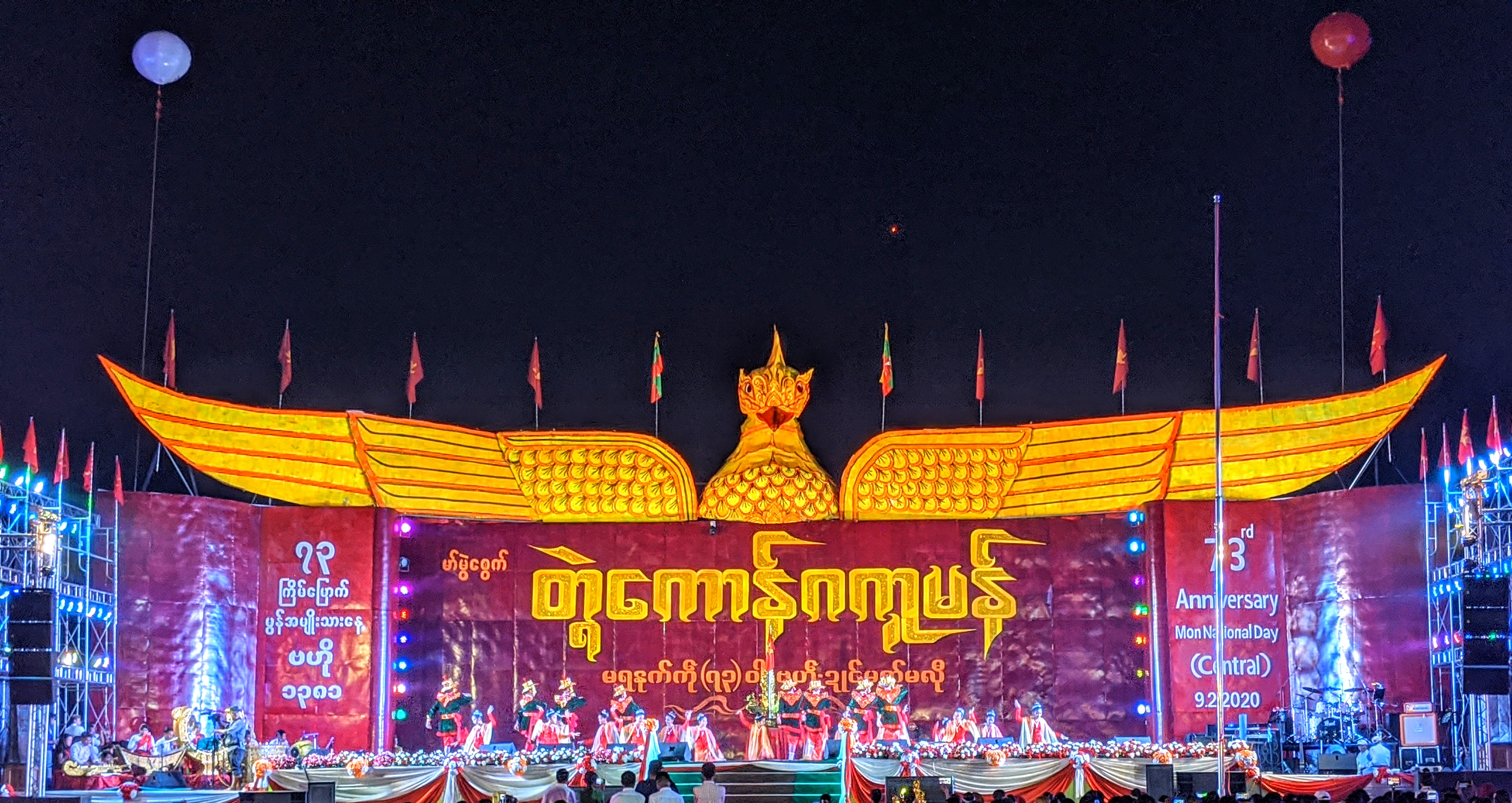

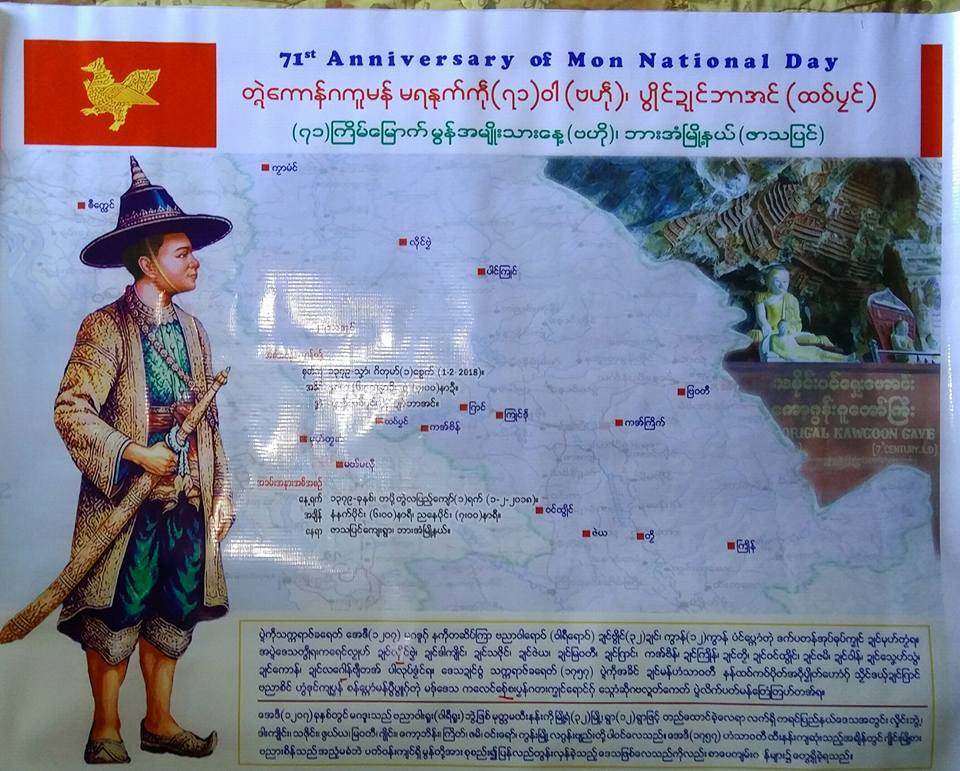
