= Myanmar Penal Code =

Criminal code of Myanmar

Penal Code of Myanmar ရာဇသတ်ကြီး
- Original title: India Act XLV, 1860
- Date effective: 1 May 1861

The Penal Code of Myanmar is the official criminal code of Myanmar. The code was enacted on 1 May 1861 during British rule in Burma and is divided into 23 chapters. The Penal Code of Myanmar is nearly identical to the Indian Penal Code, due to their shared origins under British rule.

Sections 505(a) and 505(b) of the Penal Code are commonly used against journalists, activists, and protestors. As of 30 April 2020, 8 of the 50 convicted political prisoners were serving sentences for violating one or both of said sections. In the aftermath of the 2021 Myanmar coup d'état, the military junta amended section 505(a) to criminalise "fake news" and "incitement" against the military. Lawyers who represent activists and politicians have also been charged under section 505(a).

Section 377 criminalises consensual same-sex sexual conduct, and LGBT rights groups have called for the section to be abolished.

== See also ==
- Indian Penal Code
