= 2015 Myanmar general election =

- 8 November 2015

330 of the 440 seats in the Pyithu Hluttaw 221 seats needed for a majority 168 of the 224 seats in the Amyotha Hluttaw 113 seats needed for a majority
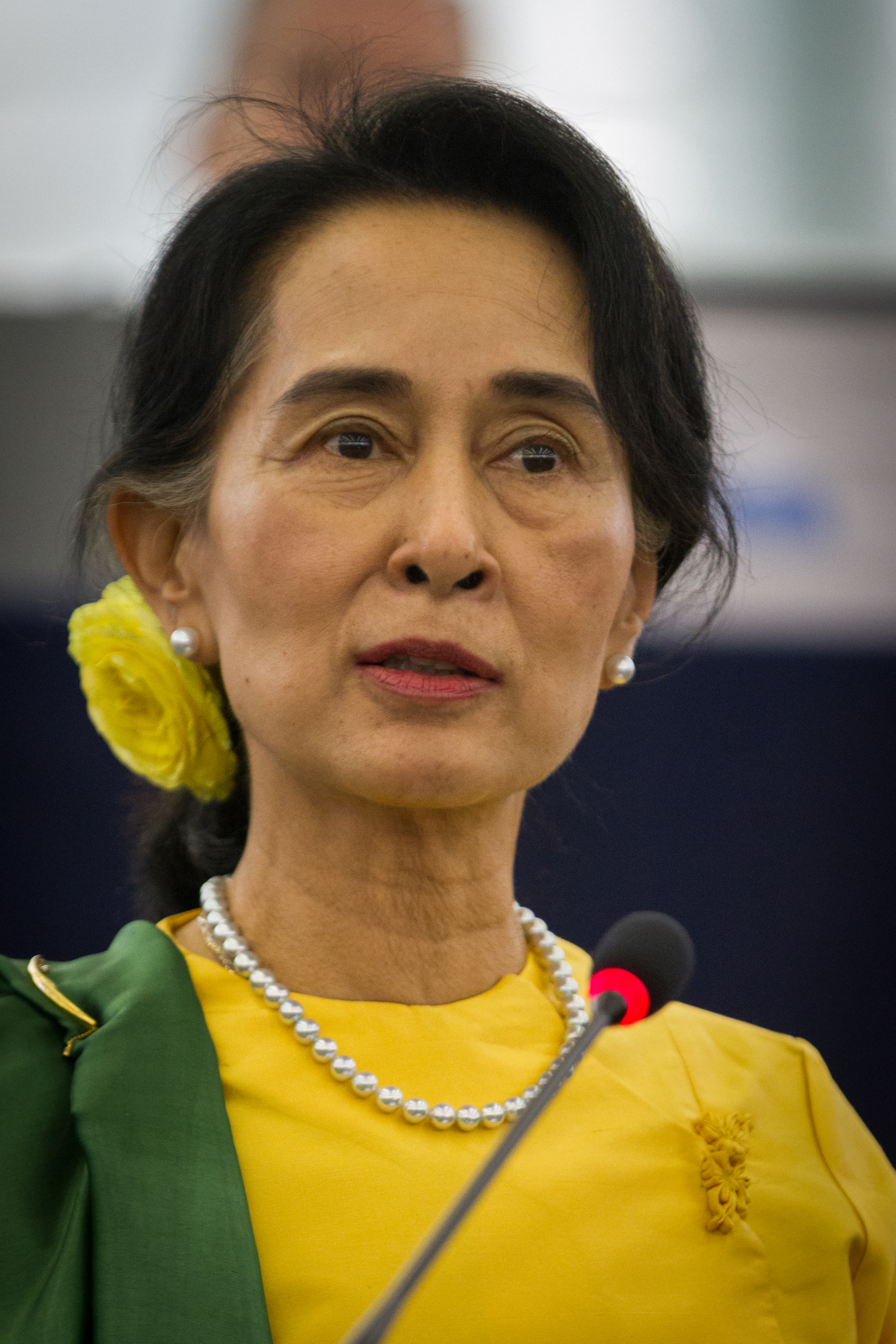

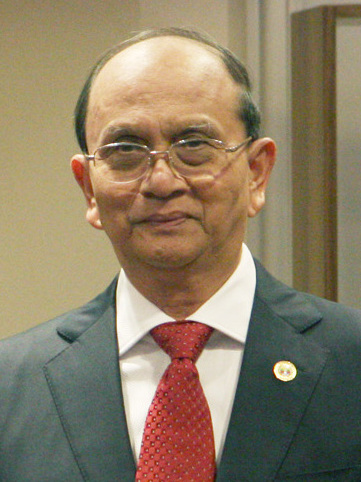
| | First party | Second party |
|---|---|---|
| Leader | Aung San Suu Kyi | Thein Sein |
| Party | NLD | USDP |
| Leader since | 27 September 1988 | 2 June 2010 |
| Leader's seat | Kawhmu | Did not contest |
| Last election | Did not contest | 259 P / 129 A |
| Seats before | 37 P / 4 A | 212 P / 124 A |
| Seats won | 255 P / 135 A | 30 P / 11 A |
| Seat change | ▲218 P / ▲131 A | ▼182 P / ▼113 A |
- Results of the election in the Pyithu Hluttaw, Amyotha Hluttaw, as well as State and Regional Hluttaws. Includes results of by-elections up to 2018.
President before election
Thein Sein
USDP
President after election
Htin Kyaw
NLD

General elections were held in Myanmar on 8 November 2015, with the National League for Democracy winning a supermajority of seats in the combined national parliament. Voting occurred in all constituencies, excluding seats appointed by the military, to select Members of Assembly to seats in both the Amyotha Hluttaw and the Pyithu Hluttaw of the Pyidaungsu Hluttaw, and State and Region Hluttaws. Ethnic Affairs Ministers were also elected by their designated electorates on the same day, although only select ethnic minorities in particular states and regions were entitled to vote for them.

These polls were the first openly contested election held in the country since 1990, which was annulled by the military government after the National League for Democracy's (NLD) victory. The poll was preceded by the 2010 general election, which was marred by a boycott and widespread allegations of systematic fraud by the victorious Union Solidarity and Development Party (USDP).

The NLD won a sweeping victory, taking 86 percent of the seats in the Pyidaungsu Hluttaw (235 in the Pyithu Hluttaw and 135 in the Amyotha Hluttaw), well more than the 67 percent supermajority needed to ensure that its preferred candidates would be elected president and second vice president in the Presidential Electoral College. While the NLD only needed a simple majority to carry on the normal business of government, it needed at least 67 percent to outvote the combined pro-military bloc in the Presidential Electoral College (the USDP and the appointed legislators representing the military). Although NLD leader Aung San Suu Kyi is constitutionally barred from the presidency (as both her late husband and her children are foreign citizens), she was made the de facto head of government, after being appointed to a newly created office, the State Counsellor of Myanmar.

== Preparation ==
As the election approached, the ruling Union Solidarity and Development Party confirmed it would contest its winning constituencies from 2010. The opposition National League for Democracy party confirmed it would contest even if a constitutional measure barring Aung San Suu Kyi from running for president was not amended.

The National Unity Party confirmed it would review its winning seats from 2010 and would consider other constituencies to challenge. The National Democratic Force said the party was prepared to challenge in as many as 200 constituencies but was still determining candidates. Ethnic political groups would contest in each state based on ethnic party strongholds, although some indicated they would consider forming an alliance as the Federal Union Party.

Before the election, 91 political parties were registered to take part in 2015.

In July 2015, Myanmar's Union Election Commission (UEC) designated the number of constituencies for running in the 2015 general election of four levels of parliamentary representatives: 330 constituencies for elections to the Pyithu Hluttaw, 168 for the Amyotha Hluttaw, 644 for the State and Regional Hluttaws (local parliaments) and 29 for ethnic ministers of the local parliaments. The UEC also issued procedures for international observers to follow in monitoring the election, which was preliminarily scheduled for the end of October or the beginning of November.

The Union Election Commission cancelled elections in Kyethi and Mong Hsu townships in Shan State following armed clashes between the Tatmadaw and the insurgent Shan State Army - North. Despite calls by the Shan State Progressive Party to proceed with the elections, the UEC has denied the request, stating that it is not possible to hold free and fair elections in these areas. Elections were further cancelled in some villages in Hopang, Namtit, both of which fall within the nation's Wa Self-Administered Division, and under the control of the insurgent United Wa State Army. The cancellation of these elections will see the vacancy of 7 seats in the House of Representatives and 14 seats in the Shan State Hluttaw.

=== Cancellation of by-elections ===
By-elections had been scheduled to be held in November or December 2014, to elect members for six seats in the Amyotha Hluttaw, 13 in the Pyithu Hluttaw, and 11 in state and regional legislatures. The seat vacancies were primarily the result of their former holders' moves to ministerial posts or departmental positions within government, but also included some other constituencies where representatives had died. The by-elections were expected to indicate the relative strengths of the contending parties, including President Thein Sein's Union Solidarity and Development Party (USDP) and the opposition National League for Democracy (NLD) party led by Aung San Suu Kyi.

On 7 September 2014, the Union Election Commission cancelled the by-election because the period for campaigning would take place too close to that of the general elections in 2015 and because the results would therefore not have had any political significance.

== Possible presidential candidates ==
=== Before election ===
In the event of a USDP victory, President Thein Sein was considered the frontrunner to continue as president after the election. Commander-in-Chief of the Military Min Aung Hlaing is close to retirement and was another favourite for the presidency, but may assume the role after a transitional period headed by another ex-military figure. Aung San Suu Kyi has reiterated her desire to become the next president but constitutional changes need to take place before she would be allowed to run. Although Parliament voted against most constitutional amendments on 25 June 2015 meaning that Aung San Suu Kyi cannot become president in the election, Suu Kyi later stated that she would be "above the President" if the NLD won the elections.

Shwe Mann, the former No. 3 in the junta who is now speaker of House of Representatives, considered reform-minded, was the most likely figure to take the mantle from Thein Sein until he was removed from his position within the party on 12 August 2015.

=== After election ===
While National League for Democracy leader Aung San Suu Kyi is constitutionally barred from the presidency, former commander-in-chief of Tatmadaw Tin Oo, Aung San Suu Kyi's personal physician Tin Myo Win, Htin Kyaw, Myo Aung and Tin Mar Aung are mentioned as possible presidential picks and Khun Htun Oo, Sai Nyunt Lwin and Aye Thar Aung are mentioned as possible vice presidential picks after the election. On 10 March 2016, Htin Kyaw and Henry Van Thio were nominated as the Vice Presidents of Myanmar by NLD. Htin Kyaw was elected as the ninth president of Myanmar on 15 March 2016 by 360 of the 652 MPs at the Assembly of the Union; Aung San Suu Kyi was appointed as the State Counsellor, a position similar to Prime Minister, on 6 April 2016.

== Results ==
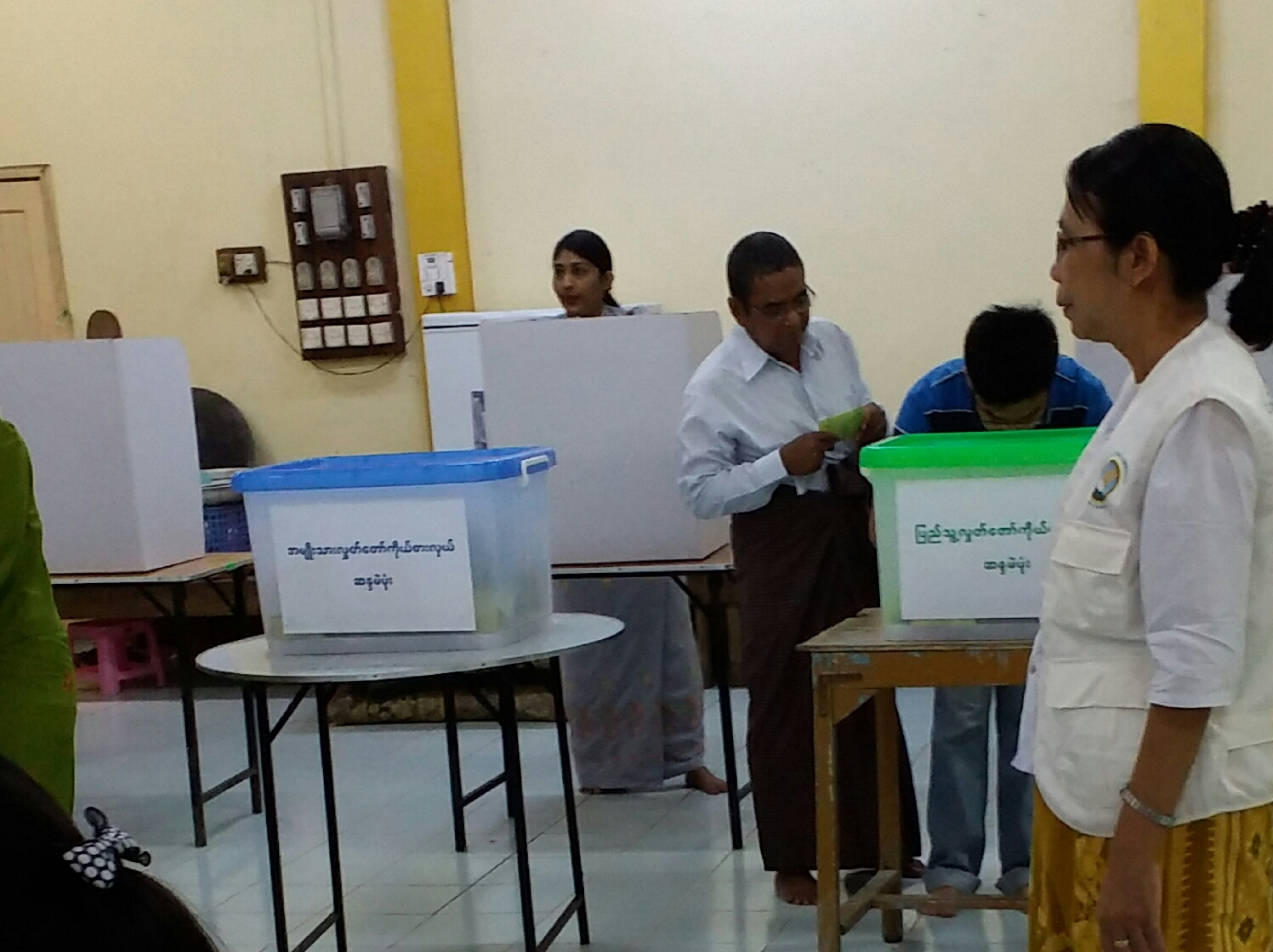
A polling station used for elections. The ballot boxes are at the front, while the voting booths are at the rear.

The National League for Democracy (NLD) obtained a majority of the total seats in both the Amyotha Hluttaw and the Pyithu Hluttaw of the Pyidaungsu Hluttaw, which is enough for its nominees to win election as president and first vice president in the Presidential Electoral College, and for control over national legislation.

The NLD also received a majority of total combined seats in the State and Regional Hluttaws, including 21 of 29 Ministers of Ethnic Affairs. With the final tally of all elected seats (township and ethnic), it is believed they will have the ability to control most local governments and parliaments, either entirely on its own or with the support of ethnic parties. The exceptions to this are the Rakhine State Hluttaw, where the Arakan National Party won a plurality of total seats and is expected to govern with the NLD's support, and the Shan State Hluttaw, where the USDP (which won a plurality of elected seats) and Military Representatives control roughly equal seats to the combined total of the various other parties, led by the Shan Nationalities League for Democracy and the NLD in second and third place, respectively.

=== Amyotha Hluttaw ===
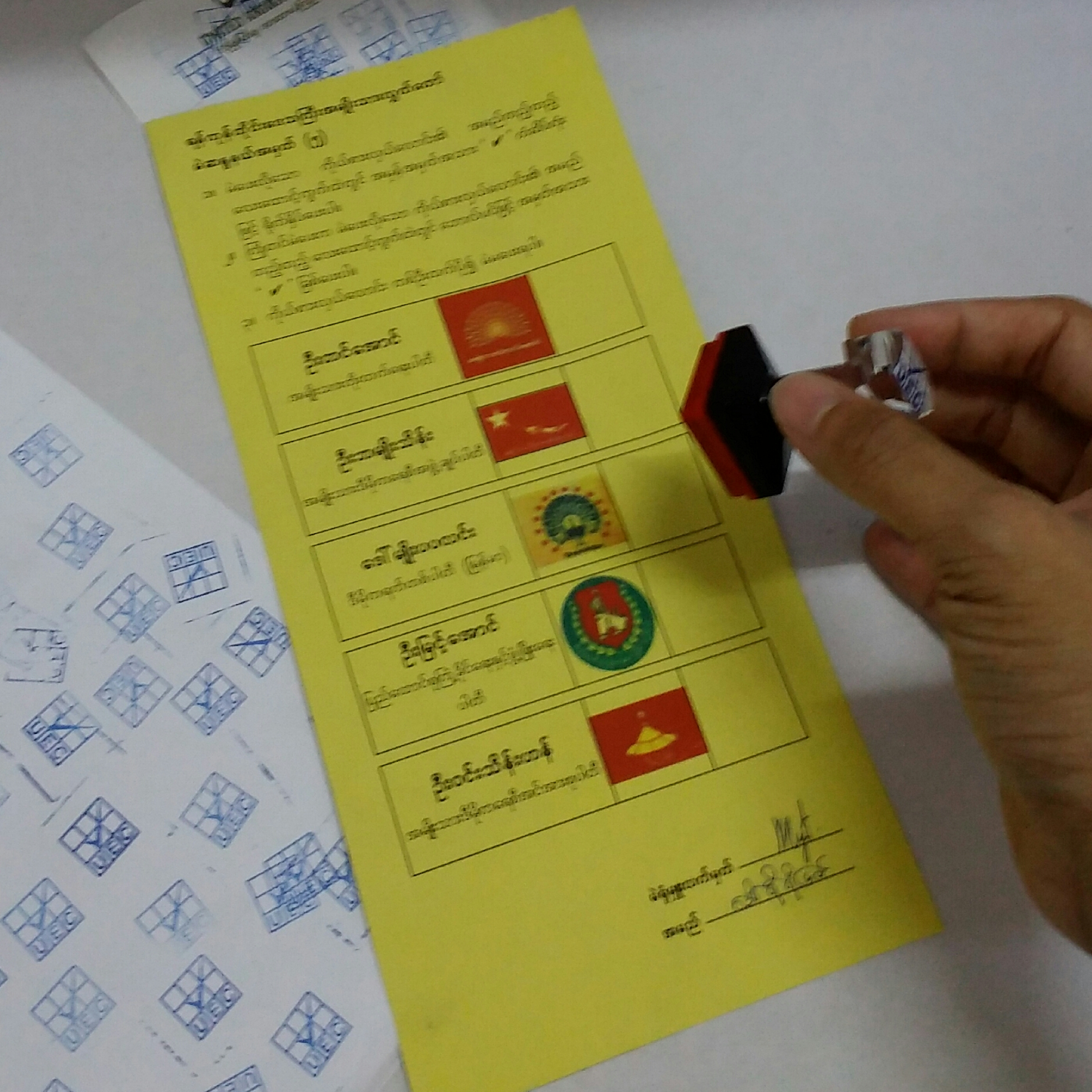
A ballot paper and rubber stamp in voting booth

168 of the 224 seats in the Amyotha Hluttaw were up for election. The remaining 56 seats (25%) were not elected, and instead reserved for military appointees (taken from Tatmadaw personnel; officially known as "Defence Services Personnel Representatives"). There are 12 members elected per state/region, including one member from each self-administered zone.

| Party | Votes | % | Seats |
|---|---|---|---|
| National League for Democracy | 13,100,673 | 57.68 | 135 |
| Union Solidarity and Development Party | 6,406,108 | 28.20 | 12 |
| Arakan National Party | 501,962 | 2.21 | 10 |
| National Unity Party | 437,361 | 1.93 | 1 |
| Shan Nationalities League for Democracy | 362,360 | 1.60 | 3 |
| National Development Party | 227,235 | 1.00 | 0 |
| Myanmar Farmers Development Party | 214,813 | 0.95 | 0 |
| Pa-O National Organisation | 158,788 | 0.70 | 1 |
| Shan Nationalities Democratic Party | 123,198 | 0.54 | 0 |
| Kayin People's Party | 120,335 | 0.53 | 0 |
| Ta'ang National Party | 93,242 | 0.41 | 1 |
| National Democratic Force | 92,638 | 0.41 | 0 |
| Mon National Party | 78,914 | 0.35 | 1 |
| Tai-Leng Nationalities Development Party | 70,479 | 0.31 | 0 |
| All Mon Region Democracy Party | 54,130 | 0.24 | 0 |
| Phalon-Sawaw Democratic Party | 40,039 | 0.18 | 0 |
| The 88 Generation Students Youth | 35,643 | 0.16 | 0 |
| Danu National Democracy Party | 31,647 | 0.14 | 0 |
| Chin National Democratic Party | 29,561 | 0.13 | 0 |
| Kachin State Democracy Party | 27,105 | 0.12 | 0 |
| Democratic Party | 24,664 | 0.11 | 0 |
| United Democratic Party | 24,203 | 0.11 | 0 |
| Unity and Democracy Party of Kachin State | 22,234 | 0.10 | 0 |
| Union Pa-O National Organisation | 19,007 | 0.08 | 0 |
| Inn National Development Party | 15,516 | 0.07 | 0 |
| Zomi Congress for Democracy | 14,689 | 0.06 | 2 |
| Kachin National Congress for Democracy | 14,009 | 0.06 | 0 |
| Lahu National Development Party | 12,707 | 0.06 | 0 |
| Rakhine State National United Party | 12,642 | 0.06 | 0 |
| Chin League for Democracy | 10,481 | 0.05 | 0 |
| Kayin State Democracy and Development Party | 9,492 | 0.04 | 0 |
| Mro National Democracy Party | 9,487 | 0.04 | 0 |
| Lisu National Development Party | 9,177 | 0.04 | 0 |
| Federal Union Party | 9,103 | 0.04 | 0 |
| New National Democracy Party | 8,274 | 0.04 | 0 |
| All Nationals' Democracy Party Kayah State | 8,010 | 0.04 | 0 |
| Chin Progressive Party | 7,857 | 0.03 | 0 |
| Kayin Democratic Party | 6,761 | 0.03 | 0 |
| People's Party of Myanmar Farmers and Workers | 6,294 | 0.03 | 0 |
| Kachin Democratic Party | 6,118 | 0.03 | 0 |
| Democratic Party for A New Society | 6,099 | 0.03 | 0 |
| Kayah Unity Democracy Party | 5,625 | 0.02 | 0 |
| Arakan Patriot Party | 5,477 | 0.02 | 0 |
| Danu National Organisation Party | 5,258 | 0.02 | 0 |
| Khumi (Khami) National Party | 4,882 | 0.02 | 0 |
| Women Party (Mon) | 4,676 | 0.02 | 0 |
| Lhaovo National Unity and Development Party | 4,046 | 0.02 | 0 |
| Ethnic National Development Party | 3,823 | 0.02 | 0 |
| Eastern Shan State Development Democratic Party | 3,641 | 0.02 | 0 |
| Kayan National Party | 3,543 | 0.02 | 0 |
| Dawei Nationality Party | 3,081 | 0.01 | 0 |
| Wa National Unity Party | 2,990 | 0.01 | 0 |
| Democracy and Peace Party | 2,906 | 0.01 | 0 |
| Daingnet National Development Party | 2,723 | 0.01 | 0 |
| Kayin Unity Democratic Party | 2,680 | 0.01 | 0 |
| Myanmar National Congress Party | 2,622 | 0.01 | 0 |
| Wa Democratic Party | 2,470 | 0.01 | 0 |
| Public Contribute Students Democracy Party | 2,386 | 0.01 | 0 |
| Shan State Kokang Democratic Party | 2,294 | 0.01 | 0 |
| Union Democratic Party | 2,244 | 0.01 | 0 |
| Confederate Farmers Party | 2,133 | 0.01 | 0 |
| Mro National Development Party | 1,812 | 0.01 | 0 |
| Shan-Ni & Northern Shan Ethnics Solidarity Party | 1,301 | 0.01 | 0 |
| Guiding Star Party | 1,197 | 0.01 | 0 |
| National Prosperity Party | 1,046 | 0.00 | 0 |
| Zo National Region Development Party | 893 | 0.00 | 0 |
| Ka Man National Development Party | 741 | 0.00 | 0 |
| Union of Myanmar Federation of National Politics | 730 | 0.00 | 0 |
| Mro Nationality Party | 329 | 0.00 | 0 |
| New Society Party | 292 | 0.00 | 0 |
| 88 Generation Democracy Party | 286 | 0.00 | 0 |
| Independents | 173,455 | 0.76 | 2 |
| Military appointees | | | 56 |
| Total | 22,714,637 | 100.00 | 224 |
| Valid votes | 22,714,637 | 94.85 | |
| Invalid/blank votes | 1,232,072 | 5.15 | |
| Total votes | 23,946,709 | 100.00 | |
| Registered voters/turnout | 34,295,334 | 69.82 | |
Source: UEC, IPU

Representatives elected into Amyotha Hluttaw
| Division | Constituency Number | Political Party | Name |
|---|---|---|---|
| Chin State | 1 | NLD | Ngun Hay |
| Chin State | 2 | NLD | Shan Awr |
| Chin State | 3 | NLD | Henry Van Thio |
| Chin State | 4 | NLD | Zone Hlae Htan |
| Chin State | 5 | ZCD | Pu Gin Kam Lian |
| Chin State | 6 | USDP | Cin Khan Pau |
| Chin State | 7 | ZCD | Kyein Ngaik Man |
| Chin State | 8 | NLD | Mon Law Maung |
| Chin State | 9 | NLD | Khi Swe Win |
| Chin State | 10 | NLD | Larl Min Htan |
| Chin State | 11 | NLD | Hway Tin |
| Chin State | 12 | NLD | Myo Htet (a.k.a. Sa Lite Myo Htike) |
| Kachin State | 1 | NUP | J Yaw Wu |
| Kachin State | 2 | NLD | Sheila Nan Taung (a.k.a. Ann Nan Taung) |
| Kachin State | 3 | NLD | Ze Khaung |
| Kachin State | 4 | NLD | Naung Na Jatan |
| Kachin State | 5 | Independent | Za Khine Tein Yein |
| Kachin State | 6 | NLD | Min Swe Naing |
| Kachin State | 7 | NLD | Win Zaw |
| Kachin State | 8 | NLD | Khin Ma Gyi |
| Kachin State | 9 | NLD | Khin Maung Myint |
| Kachin State | 10 | NLD | Thein Lwin |
| Kachin State | 11 | NLD | Kham Win Thaung |
| Kachin State | 12 | NLD | Naing Ko Ko |
| Kayah State | 1 | NLD | Phyaeyal (a.k.a. Myint Than Tun) |
| Kayah State | 2 | NLD | Shay Ral Sha Maung |
| Kayah State | 3 | NLD | Bawral Soe Wai |
| Kayah State | 4 | NLD | Saw Sein Tun |
| Kayah State | 5 | NLD | Shan Mu |
| Kayah State | 6 | NLD | Lwee Zae |
| Kayah State | 7 | NLD | Aung Kyaw Soe |
| Kayah State | 8 | USDP | Kyaw Than |
| Kayah State | 9 | Independent | Soe Thein |
| Kayah State | 10 | USDP | Sai Thae Sein |
| Kayah State | 11 | NLD | Naw Mya Say |
| Kayah State | 12 | NLD | Sai Pan Pha |
| Kayin State | 1 | NLD | Saw Moe Myint (a.k.a. Samuel) |
| Kayin State | 2 | NLD | Saw Than Htut |
| Kayin State | 3 | NLD | Saw Chit Oo |
| Kayin State | 4 | NLD | Nan Moe Moe Htwe |
| Kayin State | 5 | USDP | Sai Than Naing |
| Kayin State | 6 | USDP | Nan Ni Ni Aye |
| Kayin State | 7 | NLD | Naw Christ Tun (a.k.a. Arr Kar Moe) |
| Kayin State | 8 | NLD | Mahn Win Khaing Than |
| Kayin State | 9 | NLD | Saw B Sam Thein Myint |
| Kayin State | 10 | NLD | Myo Aung |
| Kayin State | 11 | NLD | Naw Sar Mu Htoo |
| Kayin State | 12 | NLD | Saw Yar Phaung Awa |
| Mon State | 1 | NLD | Aye Min Han |
| Mon State | 2 | NLD | Nwe Nwe Aung |
| Mon State | 3 | NLD | Khin Zaw Oo |
| Mon State | 4 | NLD | Lin Tin Htay |
| Mon State | 5 | NLD | Myat Thidar Htun |
| Mon State | 6 | NLD | Pe Tin |
| Mon State | 7 | MNP | Naing Thiha |
| Mon State | 8 | NLD | Myo Win |
| Mon State | 9 | NLD | Zaw Lin Htut |
| Mon State | 10 | NLD | Soe Thiha (a.k.a. Maung Too) |
| Mon State | 11 | NLD | Hla Myint (a.k.a. Hla Myint Than) |
| Mon State | 12 | NLD | Thiri Yadanar |
| Rakhine State | 1 | ANP | Wai Sein Aung |
| Rakhine State | 2 | ANP | Tet Tun Aung |
| Rakhine State | 3 | ANP | Khin Maung Latt |
| Rakhine State | 4 | ANP | Kyaw Kyaw |
| Rakhine State | 5 | ANP | Myint Naing |
| Rakhine State | 6 | ANP | Aye Thar Aung |
| Rakhine State | 7 | USDP | Kyaw Thein |
| Rakhine State | 8 | ANP | Kyaw Kyaw Win |
| Rakhine State | 9 | ANP | Maung Kyaw Zan |
| Rakhine State | 10 | ANP | Kyaw Htan |
| Rakhine State | 11 | ANP | Htu May |
| Rakhine State | 12 | NLD | Soe Win |
| Shan State | 1 | NLD | Zaw Min Latt (a.k.a. Ko Latt) |
| Shan State | 2 | SNLD | Sai Tun Aung |
| Shan State | 3 | SNLD | Sai Wan Hlaing Kham |
| Shan State | 4 | SNLD | Sai Ohn Kyaw |
| Shan State | 5 | TNP | Nyi Sein |
| Shan State | 6 | USDP | Sai Sai Kyauk Sam |
| Shan State | 7 | NLD | Sai Lone San Khat |
| Shan State | 8 | NLD | Ma Ma Lay |
| Shan State | 9 | PNO | Khin Thein Pe |
| Shan State | 10 | TNP | Mai Ohn Khine |
| Shan State | 11 | USDP | Kyaw Ni Niang |
| Shan State | 12 | USDP | Sai San Aung |
| Ayeyarwady Region | 1 | NLD | Soe Moe |
| Ayeyarwady Region | 2 | NLD | Sa Khin Zaw Lin |
| Ayeyarwady Region | 3 | NLD | San Myint |
| Ayeyarwady Region | 4 | NLD | Htain Win |
| Ayeyarwady Region | 5 | NLD | Maung Maung Ohn |
| Ayeyarwady Region | 6 | NLD | Man Tun Kyine |
| Ayeyarwady Region | 7 | NLD | Pya Mto |
| Ayeyarwady Region | 8 | NLD | Ei Ei Pyone |
| Ayeyarwady Region | 9 | NLD | Man Toe Shwe |
| Ayeyarwady Region | 10 | NLD | Thein Swe |
| Ayeyarwady Region | 11 | NLD | May Than Nwe |
| Ayeyarwady Region | 12 | NLD | Kyi Win |
| Bago Region | 1 | NLD | San Maung Maung |
| Bago Region | 2 | NLD | Moe Myint Aung |
| Bago Region | 3 | NLD | Shwe Shwe Sein Latt |
| Bago Region | 4 | NLD | Win Myat Aye |
| Bago Region | 5 | NLD | Tin Tin Win |
| Bago Region | 6 | NLD | Min Oo |
| Bago Region | 7 | NLD | Mya Thaung |
| Bago Region | 8 | NLD | Win Myint Chit |
| Bago Region | 9 | NLD | Aye Cho |
| Bago Region | 10 | NLD | Win Kyaing |
| Bago Region | 11 | NLD | Win Myint |
| Bago Region | 12 | NLD | Aung Thein |
| Magwe Region | 1 | NLD | Hla San |
| Magwe Region | 2 | NLD | Khin Win |
| Magwe Region | 3 | NLD | Chit Htwe |
| Magwe Region | 4 | NLD | Aung Kyi Nyunt |
| Magwe Region | 5 | NLD | Tin Aung Tun |
| Magwe Region | 6 | NLD | Win Maung |
| Magwe Region | 7 | NLD | Than Than Aye |
| Magwe Region | 8 | NLD | Win Myint |
| Magwe Region | 9 | NLD | Mya Min Swe |
| Magwe Region | 10 | NLD | Kyaw Ngwe |
| Magwe Region | 11 | NLD | Kyaw Swe |
| Magwe Region | 12 | NLD | Phyu Lwin |
| Mandalay Region | 1 | NLD | Than Win |
| Mandalay Region | 2 | NLD | Tun Tun Oo |
| Mandalay Region | 3 | NLD | Kyaw Than Htun |
| Mandalay Region | 4 | NLD | Hla Htay (a.k.a. Ohn Kyi) |
| Mandalay Region | 5 | NLD | Aung Myo Latt |
| Mandalay Region | 6 | NLD | Kywel Kywel |
| Mandalay Region | 7 | NLD | Kyaw Tote |
| Mandalay Region | 8 | USDP | Khin Aung Myint |
| Mandalay Region | 9 | NLD | Maung Maung Swe |
| Mandalay Region | 10 | NLD | Kyaw Myint Oo |
| Mandalay Region | 11 | USDP | Soe Aung |
| Mandalay Region | 12 | NLD | Kyaw Thiha |
| Sagaing Region | 1 | NLD | Kyaw Thaung |
| Sagaing Region | 2 | NLD | Aung Myo |
| Sagaing Region | 3 | NLD | Win Aung |
| Sagaing Region | 4 | NLD | Hla Oo |
| Sagaing Region | 5 | NLD | Ye Htut |
| Sagaing Region | 6 | NLD | Zaw Min |
| Sagaing Region | 7 | NLD | Khin Maung Win |
| Sagaing Region | 8 | NLD | Ko Ko Naing |
| Sagaing Region | 9 | NLD | Maung Maung Latt |
| Sagaing Region | 10 | NLD | Tin Maung Win |
| Sagaing Region | 11 | NLD | Nyi Nyi Htwe (a.k.a. Ko Ko Lay) |
| Sagaing Region | 12 | NLD | Min Naing |
| Tanintharyi Region | 1 | NLD | Aung Win |
| Tanintharyi Region | 2 | NLD | Thet Naing Soe |
| Tanintharyi Region | 3 | NLD | Tun Lin |
| Tanintharyi Region | 4 | NLD | Han Win Thein |
| Tanintharyi Region | 5 | NLD | Lin Wai Phyo Latt |
| Tanintharyi Region | 6 | NLD | Tin Wai |
| Tanintharyi Region | 7 | NLD | Zaw Hein |
| Tanintharyi Region | 8 | NLD | Okkar Min |
| Tanintharyi Region | 9 | NLD | Kin Shein |
| Tanintharyi Region | 10 | NLD | Soe Thein (a.k.a. Maung Soe) |
| Tanintharyi Region | 11 | NLD | Khin Maung Win |
| Tanintharyi Region | 12 | NLD | Khin Myo Win |
| Yangon Region | 1 | NLD | Htwe Kywe |
| Yangon Region | 2 | NLD | Htay Oo |
| Yangon Region | 3 | NLD | Myat Nyana Soe |
| Yangon Region | 4 | NLD | Than Soe (a.k.a. Than Soe (Economics)) |
| Yangon Region | 5 | NLD | Ba Myo Thein |
| Yangon Region | 6 | NLD | Aung Thu |
| Yangon Region | 7 | NLD | Ye Myint Soe |
| Yangon Region | 8 | NLD | Kyaw Htwe |
| Yangon Region | 9 | NLD | Pe Chit |
| Yangon Region | 10 | NLD | Naw Hla Hla Soe |
| Yangon Region | 11 | NLD | Aye Bo |
| Yangon Region | 12 | NLD | Kyaw Naing |

The list of military appointees was published as the UEC Announcement 2/2016.

=== Pyithu Hluttaw ===
There are 330 of 440 seats in the Pyithu Hluttaw that are elected, of which 323 were filled after seven seats were cancelled due to the ongoing armed insurgencies in Shan State. The remaining 110 seats (25%) were not elected, and instead reserved for military appointees (taken from Tatmadaw personnel; officially known as "Defence Services Personnel Representatives"). Members are elected to constituencies based on township and population.

| Party | Votes | % | Seats |
|---|---|---|---|
| National League for Democracy | 12,821,899 | 57.20 | 255 |
| Union Solidarity and Development Party | 6,349,879 | 28.33 | 30 |
| Arakan National Party | 490,664 | 2.19 | 12 |
| National Unity Party | 418,443 | 1.87 | 0 |
| Shan Nationalities League for Democracy | 357,928 | 1.60 | 12 |
| National Development Party | 228,483 | 1.02 | 0 |
| Pa-O National Organisation | 224,673 | 1.00 | 3 |
| Myanmar Farmers Development Party | 173,420 | 0.77 | 0 |
| Shan Nationalities Democratic Party | 120,815 | 0.54 | 0 |
| National Democratic Force | 113,292 | 0.51 | 0 |
| Mon National Party | 94,721 | 0.42 | 0 |
| Ta'ang National Party | 86,394 | 0.39 | 3 |
| Kayin People's Party | 71,776 | 0.32 | 0 |
| Tai-Leng Nationalities Development Party | 62,907 | 0.28 | 0 |
| The 88 Generation Students Youth | 47,763 | 0.21 | 0 |
| All Mon Region Democracy Party | 44,798 | 0.20 | 0 |
| Phalon-Sawaw Democratic Party | 37,010 | 0.17 | 0 |
| Chin National Democratic Party | 30,957 | 0.14 | 0 |
| Kachin State Democracy Party | 27,682 | 0.12 | 1 |
| Zomi Congress for Democracy | 27,142 | 0.12 | 2 |
| Lisu National Development Party | 24,096 | 0.11 | 2 |
| Danu National Democracy Party | 22,544 | 0.10 | 0 |
| Lahu National Development Party | 19,988 | 0.09 | 0 |
| Democratic Party | 19,325 | 0.09 | 0 |
| United Democratic Party | 18,683 | 0.08 | 0 |
| Chin League for Democracy | 17,117 | 0.08 | 0 |
| Rakhine State National United Party | 16,297 | 0.07 | 0 |
| Democratic Party for a New Society | 14,708 | 0.07 | 0 |
| Kokang Democracy and Unity Party | 13,990 | 0.06 | 1 |
| Federal Union Party | 12,972 | 0.06 | 0 |
| Kayin Democratic Party | 12,372 | 0.06 | 0 |
| Wa National Unity Party | 11,760 | 0.05 | 0 |
| Kachin National Congress for Democracy | 11,544 | 0.05 | 0 |
| Kayin Democratic Party–Kayin People's Party | 11,134 | 0.05 | 0 |
| Kachin Democratic Party | 11,082 | 0.05 | 0 |
| Karen National Party | 10,861 | 0.05 | 0 |
| Arakan Patriot Party | 10,439 | 0.05 | 0 |
| Kayan National Party | 9,953 | 0.04 | 0 |
| New National Democracy Party | 9,124 | 0.04 | 0 |
| Wa Democratic Party | 8,216 | 0.04 | 1 |
| People's Party of Myanmar Farmers and Workers | 7,965 | 0.04 | 0 |
| Modern People Party | 7,848 | 0.04 | 0 |
| Inn National Development Party | 7,160 | 0.03 | 0 |
| Myanmar National Congress Party | 6,845 | 0.03 | 0 |
| Lhaovo National Unity and Development Party | 6,507 | 0.03 | 0 |
| Union Pao National Organisation | 6,281 | 0.03 | 0 |
| Chin Progressive Party | 6,212 | 0.03 | 0 |
| Khumi (Khami) National Party | 5,694 | 0.03 | 0 |
| All Nationals' Democracy Party Kayah State | 5,626 | 0.03 | 0 |
| Khami National Development Party | 5,111 | 0.02 | 0 |
| Union of Myanmar Federation of National Politics | 4,695 | 0.02 | 0 |
| Inn National League Party | 4,322 | 0.02 | 0 |
| Danu National Organisation Party | 4,275 | 0.02 | 0 |
| New Society Party | 3,833 | 0.02 | 0 |
| Public Contribute Students Democracy Party | 3,509 | 0.02 | 0 |
| Kayah Unity Democracy Party | 3,501 | 0.02 | 0 |
| Guiding Star Party | 3,496 | 0.02 | 0 |
| Mro National Democracy Party | 3,389 | 0.02 | 0 |
| Confederate Farmers Party | 3,283 | 0.01 | 0 |
| Peace for Diversity Party | 3,100 | 0.01 | 0 |
| Democracy Party for Myanmar New Society | 3,042 | 0.01 | 0 |
| Asho Chin National Party | 3,038 | 0.01 | 0 |
| National Unity Congress Party | 2,832 | 0.01 | 0 |
| Eastern Shan State Development Democratic Party | 2,337 | 0.01 | 0 |
| Dawei Nationality Party | 2,220 | 0.01 | 0 |
| Shan State Kokang Democratic Party | 2,071 | 0.01 | 0 |
| Akha National Development Party | 2,038 | 0.01 | 0 |
| National Prosperity Party | 2,005 | 0.01 | 0 |
| National Unity Party–National Development Party | 1,709 | 0.01 | 0 |
| Democracy and Peace Party | 1,374 | 0.01 | 0 |
| Union Farmer Force Party | 1,266 | 0.01 | 0 |
| Union Democratic Party | 1,106 | 0.00 | 0 |
| Shan-Ni & Northern Shan Ethnics Solidarity Party | 1,075 | 0.00 | 0 |
| Mro National Development Party | 1,053 | 0.00 | 0 |
| Women Party (Mon) | 892 | 0.00 | 0 |
| Negotiation, Stability and Peace Party | 800 | 0.00 | 0 |
| Zo National Region Development Party | 541 | 0.00 | 0 |
| People Democracy Party | 340 | 0.00 | 0 |
| Unity and Democracy Party of Kachin State | 239 | 0.00 | 0 |
| Ka Man National Development Party | 121 | 0.00 | 0 |
| National Democratic Party for Development | 101 | 0.00 | 0 |
| New Era Union Party | 24 | 0.00 | 0 |
| Independents | 166,583 | 0.74 | 1 |
| Cancelled | | | 7 |
| Military appointees | | | 110 |
| Total | 22,416,310 | 100.00 | 440 |
| Valid votes | 22,416,310 | 93.75 | |
| Invalid/blank votes | 1,495,474 | 6.25 | |
| Total votes | 23,911,784 | 100.00 | |
| Registered voters/turnout | 34,295,334 | 69.72 | |
Source: UEC, IPU

Representatives elected into Pyithu Hluttaw
| Division | Constituency Township | Political Party | Name |
|---|---|---|---|
| Chin State | Falam | NLD | Salai Reyalbal (a.k.a. Salai Yambel) |
| Chin State | Hakha | NLD | Nia Oh |
| Chin State | Kanpetlet | NLD | San Khin |
| Chin State | Madupi | NLD | Par Htan |
| Chin State | Mindat | NLD | Nay Lin Aung |
| Chin State | Paletwa | NLD | Sein Aung |
| Chin State | Thantlang | NLD | Ni Shwe Lyan |
| Chin State | Tiddim | ZCD | Chin Sian Thang |
| Chin State | Tonzang | ZCD | Kham Khant Htan |
| Kachin State | Bhamo | NLD | Aung Thein |
| Kachin State | Chipwi | USDP | Zone Taint |
| Kachin State | Hpakant | NLD | Tint Soe |
| Kachin State | Hsawlaw | LNDP | Lae Mae Lay |
| Kachin State | Injangyang | KSDP | Lama Naw Aung |
| Kachin State | Kawnglanghpu | LNDP | Armoe See |
| Kachin State | Machanbaw | USDP | Nam Mon Htin |
| Kachin State | Mansi | NLD | Chin Phae Lin |
| Kachin State | Mogaung | NLD | Win Naing |
| Kachin State | Mohnyin | NLD | San San Ei |
| Kachin State | Momauk | NLD | Win Aung (politician) |
| Kachin State | Myitkyina | NLD | In Htone Khar Naw |
| Kachin State | Nogmung | USDP | Ji Pan Sar |
| Kachin State | Putao | NLD | Moe Swe |
| Kachin State | Shwegu | NLD | Zarni Min |
| Kachin State | Sumprabum | NLD | Lone Jone Seng Mai |
| Kachin State | Tanai | NLD | Lin Lin Oo |
| Kachin State | Wingmaw | NLD | La Gan Zal Jone |
| Kayah State | Bawlakhe | USDP | Aye Maung |
| Kayah State | Demoso | NLD | Paw Seng |
| Kayah State | Hpasaung | NLD | Nan Htwe Thu |
| Kayah State | Hpruso | NLD | We Du |
| Kayah State | Loikaw | NLD | Khin Sithu |
| Kayah State | Mese | NLD | Than Lin Lin |
| Kayah State | Shadaw | NLD | Wint War Tun |
| Kayin State | Hlaingbwe | NLD | Khin Cho |
| Kayin State | Hpa-an | NLD | Nang Than Than Lwin |
| Kayin State | Kawkareik | NLD | Soe Htay |
| Kayin State | Kyain Seikgyi | NLD | Saw Tin Win |
| Kayin State | Myawaddy | NLD | Sein Bo |
| Kayin State | Phapun | USDP | Tun Mya Aung (a.k.a. Saw Tun Mya Aung) |
| Kayin State | Thandaung | NLD | Son Victor Khalite |
| Mon State | Bilin | NLD | Tin Ko Ko Oo (a.k.a. A Tut) |
| Mon State | Chaungzon | NLD | Khin Htay Kwal |
| Mon State | Kyaukmaraw | NLD | San Kyaw Wan Maung |
| Mon State | Kyaikto | NLD | Khin Saung |
| Mon State | Mawlamyine | NLD | Naing Thaung Nyunt |
| Mon State | Mudon | NLD | Saw Tun |
| Mon State | Paung | NLD | Mi Kon Chan |
| Mon State | Thanbyuzayat | NLD | Nyan Hein |
| Mon State | Thaton | NLD | Mar Mar Khaing |
| Mon State | Ye | NLD | Aung Tun Khaing |
| Rakhine State | Ann | USDP | Thein Swe |
| Rakhine State | Buthidaung | ANP | Aung Thaing Shwe |
| Rakhine State | Gwa | NLD | Myint Wai |
| Rakhine State | Kyaukphyu | ANP | Ba Shein |
| Rakhine State | Kyauktaw | ANP | Oo Tun Win |
| Rakhine State | Manaung | NLD | Tin Nu |
| Rakhine State | Maungdaw | ANP | Hla Tun Kyaw |
| Rakhine State | Minbya | ANP | Sit Naing |
| Rakhine State | Mrauk-U | ANP | Oo Hla Saw |
| Rakhine State | Myebon | ANP | Pe Than |
| Rakhine State | Pauktaw | ANP | Aung Kyaw Dan |
| Rakhine State | Ponnagyun | ANP | Do Tun Maung |
| Rakhine State | Ramree | ANP | Kyaw Shwe |
| Rakhine State | Rathedaung | ANP | Khin Saw Wai |
| Rakhine State | Sittwe | ANP | Maung Thein Khaing |
| Rakhine State | Thandwe | NLD | Min Kyi |
| Rakhine State | Toungup | NLD | Ni Ni May Myint |
| Shan State | Hseni | SNLD | Sai Oo Kham |
| Shan State | Hopang | WDP | Kyin Wang |
| Shan State | Hopong | PNO | Kham Aung Kyaw |
| Shan State | Hsi Hseng | PNO | Kham Than Htoo |
| Shan State | Hsipaw | SNLD | Sai Thant Zin |
| Shan State | Kalaw | NLD | Pyone Kaythi Naing |
| Shan State | Kengtung | USDP | Steven |
| Shan State | Kongyan | USDP | Le Kyain Phu (a.k.a. Myint Swe) |
| Shan State | Kunhing | SNLD | Nan Khin Saw |
| Shan State | Kunlong | KDUP | Yan Kyin Ral |
| Shan State | Kutkai | USDP | T Khun Myat |
| Shan State | Kyaukme | SNLD | Sai Htun Aung |
| Shan State | Laihka | SNLD | Sai Mone |
| Shan State | Linkhae | SNLD | Sai Ba Thein |
| Shan State | Lashio | USDP | Sai Mauk Kham |
| Shan State | Laukkaing | USDP | Lu Htal Hone |
| Shan State | Lawksawk | USDP | Khin Maing Myint |
| Shan State | Loilen | USDP | Khin Maung Thi |
| Shan State | Mabeine | NLD | Aung Myint Shein |
| Shan State | Manton | TNP | Nang Moe |
| Shan State | Matman | Independent | Tin Aye |
| Shan State | Mawkmai | USDP | Sai Ngo Seng Hein |
| Shan State | Monghsat | USDP | Sai Khattiya |
| Shan State | Mongkhet | USDP | Sel Ki Kaw |
| Shan State | Mong Kung | SNLD | Sai Sang Mai |
| Shan State | Mongmit | NLD | Toe Thaung |
| Shan State | Mong Nai | SNLD | Sai San Thein |
| Shan State | Mong Pan | USDP | Sai Kyaw Moe |
| Shan State | Mong Ping | USDP | Sai Tun Sein |
| Shan State | Mongpyak | USDP | Lin Zaw Tun |
| Shan State | Mongtong | NLD | Aung Kyaw Oo |
| Shan State | Mong Yang | USDP | Sai San |
| Shan State | Mong Yai | SNLD | Sai Thiha Kyaw |
| Shan State | Mong Yawng | NLD | Sai Tun Aung |
| Shan State | Mu Se | SNLD | Sai Phoe Myat |
| Shan State | Namtu | SNLD | Nan Kham Aye |
| Shan State | Namhsan | TNP | Win Htoo |
| Shan State | Namhkam | TNP | Tun Kyaw |
| Shan State | Nansang | USDP | Htay Lwin |
| Shan State | Nawnghkio | NLD | Tun Aung (a.k.a. Tun Tun Hein) |
| Shan State | Nyaung Shwe | NLD | Win Myint Oo (a.k.a. Nay Myu) |
| Shan State | Pekon | NLD | Phoe Maung |
| Shan State | Pindaya | NLD | Soe Myint |
| Shan State | Pinlaung | PNO | Khun Maung Thaung |
| Shan State | Tangyan | SNLD | Sai Aung Pwint |
| Shan State | Tachileik | NLD | Htay Win |
| Shan State | Taunggyi | NLD | Than Ngwe |
| Shan State | Ywangan | NLD | Aung Soe Min |
| Ayeyarwady Region | Bogale | NLD | Min Thaing |
| Ayeyarwady Region | Dedaye | NLD | Khin Nyo |
| Ayeyarwady Region | Danubyu | NLD | Tin Hla |
| Ayeyarwady Region | Einme | NLD | Thanda |
| Ayeyarwady Region | Hinthada | NLD | Khin Maung Yee |
| Ayeyarwady Region | Ingapu | NLD | Aye Win |
| Ayeyarwady Region | Kangyidaunt | NLD | Shwe Hla Kyaing |
| Ayeyarwady Region | Kyaiklat | NLD | Yan Lin |
| Ayeyarwady Region | Kyangin | NLD | Tun Lin Maw |
| Ayeyarwady Region | Kyaunggon | USDP | Thein Tun |
| Ayeyarwady Region | Kyonpyaw | NLD | Soe Aung Naing |
| Ayeyarwady Region | Labutta | NLD | Aye Kyu |
| Ayeyarwady Region | Lemyethna | NLD | Zaw Min Thein |
| Ayeyarwady Region | Ma-ubin | NLD | Sein Win |
| Ayeyarwady Region | Mawlamyinegyun | NLD | Win Swe |
| Ayeyarwady Region | Myanaung | NLD | Khin Maung Latt |
| Ayeyarwady Region | Myaungmya | NLD | Soe Moe Thu |
| Ayeyarwady Region | Ngapudaw | NLD | Than Aung |
| Ayeyarwady Region | Nyaungdon | NLD | Ohn Lwin |
| Ayeyarwady Region | Pantanaw | NLD | Man Nyunt Thein |
| Ayeyarwady Region | Pathein | NLD | Wai Hlaing Tun |
| Ayeyarwady Region | Pyapon | NLD | Win Htut |
| Ayeyarwady Region | Thabaung | NLD | Thein Tun |
| Ayeyarwady Region | Wakema | NLD | Zaw Thein |
| Ayeyarwady Region | Yekyi | NLD | San Shwe Win |
| Ayeyarwady Region | Zalun | NLD | Aung Min |
| Bago Region | Bago | NLD | Shwe Pone |
| Bago Region | Daik-U | NLD | Phone Myint Aung |
| Bago Region | Gyobingauk | NLD | Htay Min Thein |
| Bago Region | Kawa | NLD | Hla Than |
| Bago Region | Kyauktaga | NLD | Khin Maung Oo |
| Bago Region | Kyaukkyi | NLD | Myint Ngwe |
| Bago Region | Letpadan | NLD | Kyaw Minn |
| Bago Region | Minhla | NLD | Than Aung Soe |
| Bago Region | Monyo | NLD | Kyaw Myo Min |
| Bago Region | Nattalin | NLD | Khin Aye |
| Bago Region | Nyaunglebin | NLD | Myint Thein |
| Bago Region | Okpho | NLD | Zaw Min |
| Bago Region | Oktwin | NLD | Cho Cho |
| Bago Region | Padaung | NLD | Khin Hnin Thit |
| Bago Region | Paukkaung | NLD | Ni Nio Dun |
| Bago Region | Paungde | NLD | Aye Min Aung (a.k.a. Y Min Min) |
| Bago Region | Pyay | NLD | Khin Soe Soe Kyi |
| Bago Region | Pyu | NLD | Than Nyunt |
| Bago Region | Shwedaung | NLD | Tin Soe |
| Bago Region | Shwegyin | NLD | Saw Thalay Saw |
| Bago Region | Tantabin | NLD | Zaw Win |
| Bago Region | Taungoo | NLD | Khin Maung Than |
| Bago Region | Thanatpin | NLD | Myint Oo |
| Bago Region | Tharrawaddy | NLD | Aung Myint |
| Bago Region | Thegon | NLD | Aung Than |
| Bago Region | Waw | NLD | Tin Htwe |
| Bago Region | Yedashe | NLD | Kyi Moe Naing |
| Bago Region | Zigon | USDP | Nyan Tun |
| Magwe Region | Chauk | NLD | Bo Gyi |
| Magwe Region | Yenangyaung | NLD | Thar Cho (a.k.a. Tin Kyaing) |
| Magwe Region | Salin | NLD | Kan Oo |
| Magwe Region | Magway | NLD | Myint Oo |
| Magwe Region | Thayet | NLD | Kan Myint |
| Magwe Region | Taungdwingyi | NLD | Min Htein |
| Magwe Region | Myothit | NLD | Thar Aung |
| Magwe Region | Natmauk | NLD | Aung Tin Lin |
| Magwe Region | Minbu | NLD | Win Win |
| Magwe Region | Pwintbyu | NLD | Htun Htun |
| Magwe Region | Kamma | NLD | Sein Han |
| Magwe Region | Sinbaungwe | NLD | Nay Htet Win |
| Magwe Region | Aunglan | NLD | Aung Thu Myint |
| Magwe Region | Seikphyu | NLD | Aung Thaik |
| Magwe Region | Saw | NLD | Kyaw Tin |
| Magwe Region | Mindon | NLD | Khin Than Nu |
| Magwe Region | Ngape | NLD | Soe Myint (a.k.a. Soe Lwin) |
| Magwe Region | Sidoktaya | NLD | Kyaw Aung Lwin |
| Magwe Region | Minhla | NLD | Kyaw Gyi (a.k.a. Ohn Khin) |
| Magwe Region | Yesagyo | NLD | Toe Shwe (a.k.a. Dr Tin Htay Aye) |
| Magwe Region | Myaing | NLD | Aung Khin Win |
| Magwe Region | Pakkoku | NLD | Paik Ko |
| Magwe Region | Pauk | NLD | Ye Tun Win |
| Magwe Region | Gangaw | NLD | Yin Min Hlaing |
| Magwe Region | Tilin | NLD | Myat Lay Oo |
| Mandalay Region | Amarapura | NLD | Soe Myint (a.k.a. Aung Zaw Myint) |
| Mandalay Region | Aungmyethazan | NLD | Hla Moe |
| Mandalay Region | Chanayethazan | NLD | Myo Naing |
| Mandalay Region | Chanmyathazi | NLD | Sai Hla Thein |
| Mandalay Region | Dekkhinathiri | NLD | Thant Zin Tun |
| Mandalay Region | Kyaukpadaung | NLD | Shwe Ko |
| Mandalay Region | Kyaukse | NLD | Tin Aung |
| Mandalay Region | Lewe | NLD | Myo Zaw Oo |
| Mandalay Region | Madaya | NLD | Zaw Min Lwin |
| Mandalay Region | Mahlaing | NLD | Hla Tung Aung |
| Mandalay Region | Maha Aungmye | NLD | Nyein Thit (a.k.a. Taung Tun) |
| Mandalay Region | Meiktila | USDP | Maung Thin |
| Mandalay Region | Mogok | NLD | Aung Nein |
| Mandalay Region | Myit Thar | NLD | Lin Lin Kyaw |
| Mandalay Region | Myingyan | NLD | Thet Lwin (a.k.a. Paw Khin) |
| Mandalay Region | Natogyi | NLD | Naing Htoo Aung |
| Mandalay Region | Nganzun | NLD | Min Thein |
| Mandalay Region | Nyaung-U | NLD | Saw |
| Mandalay Region | Ottarathiri | NLD | Kyaw Min Hlaing |
| Mandalay Region | Patheingye | NLD | Thaung Htay Lin |
| Mandalay Region | Pobbathiri | NLD | Tin Thit |
| Mandalay Region | Pyigyidagun | NLD | Kyaw Lin Soe |
| Mandalay Region | Pyin Oo Lwin | NLD | Aung Khin |
| Mandalay Region | Pyinmana | NLD | Than Soe Aung |
| Mandalay Region | Pyawbwe | USDP | Thaung Aye |
| Mandalay Region | Sintgaing | NLD | Kyi Moh Moh Lwin |
| Mandalay Region | Singu | NLD | Zaw Win Myint |
| Mandalay Region | Tada U | NLD | Soe Nwe Aye |
| Mandalay Region | Tatkone | NLD | Mae Mae Khine |
| Mandalay Region | Taungtha | NLD | Sit Aye |
| Mandalay Region | Thabeikkyin | NLD | Aung Nite |
| Mandalay Region | Thazi | USDP | Than Soe |
| Mandalay Region | Wundwin | NLD | Khin Maung Soe |
| Mandalay Region | Yamethin | USDP | Ko Ko Naung |
| Mandalay Region | Zabuthiri | NLD | Zayar Thaw |
| Mandalay Region | Zeyarthiri | USDP | Hla Htay Win |
| Sagaing Region | Ayadaw | NLD | Khin Maung Thin |
| Sagaing Region | Banmauk | NLD | Kyaw Soe |
| Sagaing Region | Budalin | NLD | Myint Han Trun |
| Sagaing Region | Chaung-U | NLD | Myo |
| Sagaing Region | Hkamti | NLD | Aung Than Sein |
| Sagaing Region | Homalin | NLD | Myo Nyunt |
| Sagaing Region | Indaw | NLD | Pyone |
| Sagaing Region | Kale | NLD | Aye Aye Mu |
| Sagaing Region | Kalewa | NLD | Thar Htoo Myint |
| Sagaing Region | Kanbalu | NLD | Hlaing Myint Han |
| Sagaing Region | Kani | NLD | Tun Tun Naing |
| Sagaing Region | Katha | NLD | Myint Kyi |
| Sagaing Region | Kawlin | NLD | Myo Zaw Aung |
| Sagaing Region | Kyunhla | NLD | Tun Win |
| Sagaing Region | Khin-U | NLD | Win Aung |
| Sagaing Region | Lahe | NLD | Thet Naung |
| Sagaing Region | Leshi | NLD | Kyaw Htay |
| Sagaing Region | Mawlaik | NLD | Cho Cho Win |
| Sagaing Region | Mingin | USDP | Maung Myint |
| Sagaing Region | Myinmu | NLD | Soe San Thet Tun |
| Sagaing Region | Myaung | NLD | Htay Ngwe |
| Sagaing Region | Monywa | NLD | Thant Zin Maung |
| Sagaing Region | Nanyun | NLD | Wan Hla |
| Sagaing Region | Pale | NLD | Khin San Hlaing |
| Sagaing Region | Paungbyin | NLD | Tun Wai |
| Sagaing Region | Pinlebu | NLD | Myint Naung |
| Sagaing Region | Sagaing | NLD | Khin Maung Thein |
| Sagaing Region | Salingyi | NLD | Win Thein Zaw |
| Sagaing Region | Shwebo | NLD | A Zin Latt |
| Sagaing Region | Tabayin | NLD | Win Myint Aung |
| Sagaing Region | Tamu | NLD | Naing Naing Win |
| Sagaing Region | Taze | NLD | Myint Tun |
| Sagaing Region | Tigyaing | NLD | Maung Maung |
| Sagaing Region | Wetlet | NLD | Myint Thein |
| Sagaing Region | Wuntho | NLD | Nay Soe Aung |
| Sagaing Region | Ye-U | NLD | Min Thein |
| Sagaing Region | Yinmabin | NLD | Aung Soe |
| Tanintharyi Region | Bokepyin | NLD | Nay Lin Tun |
| Tanintharyi Region | Dawei | NLD | Aung Sein |
| Tanintharyi Region | Kawthaung | NLD | Khin Zaw |
| Tanintharyi Region | Kyunsu | NLD | Tin Tin Ye |
| Tanintharyi Region | Launglon | NLD | Khin Sari |
| Tanintharyi Region | Myeik | NLD | Soe Paing Htay |
| Tanintharyi Region | Palaw | NLD | Ohn Khin |
| Tanintharyi Region | Tinnathayi | NLD | Aung Kyaw Hein |
| Tanintharyi Region | Thayetchaung | NLD | Aung Soe |
| Tanintharyi Region | Yebyu | NLD | Thet Naing Oo |
| Yangon Region | Ahlone | NLD | Ye Lwin |
| Yangon Region | Bahan | NLD | Tun Myint |
| Yangon Region | Botahtaung | NLD | Myint Myint Soe (a.k.a. May Soe) |
| Yangon Region | Cocokyun | USDP | Thet Swe |
| Yangon Region | Dagon | NLD | Thet Thet Khaing |
| Yangon Region | Dagon Seikkan | NLD | Kyaw Win |
| Yangon Region | Dala | NLD | Sein Mya Aye |
| Yangon Region | Dawbon | NLD | Htay Win Aung (Pyone Cho) |
| Yangon Region | East Dagon | NLD | Myo Aung |
| Yangon Region | Hlaing | NLD | Aung Kyaw Kyaw Oo |
| Yangon Region | Hlaingthaya | NLD | Than Myint |
| Yangon Region | Hlegu | NLD | Thein Tan |
| Yangon Region | Hmawbi | NLD | Aung Win |
| Yangon Region | Htantabin | NLD | Nay Myo Tun |
| Yangon Region | Insein | NLD | Maung Maung Oo |
| Yangon Region | Kamayut | NLD | Kyaw Min |
| Yangon Region | Kawhmu | NLD | Aung San Suu Kyi |
| Yangon Region | Khayan | NLD | Aye Min |
| Yangon Region | Kungyangon | NLD | Soe Thura Tun |
| Yangon Region | Kyauktada | NLD | Nay Myo Htet |
| Yangon Region | Kyauktan | NLD | Aye Mya Mya Myo |
| Yangon Region | Kyeemyindaing | NLD | Zaw Win |
| Yangon Region | Lanmadaw | NLD | Khin Maung Win |
| Yangon Region | Latha | NLD | Khin Moh Moh Aung |
| Yangon Region | Mayangone | NLD | May Win Myint |
| Yangon Region | Mingalar Taung Nyunt | NLD | Phyu Phyu Thin |
| Yangon Region | Mingaladon | NLD | Aung Hlaing Win |
| Yangon Region | North Dagon | NLD | Khin Maung Maung |
| Yangon Region | North Okkalapa | NLD | Than Win |
| Yangon Region | Pabedan | NLD | Nay Pho Ba Swe |
| Yangon Region | Pazundaung | NLD | Myint Lwin |
| Yangon Region | Sanchaung | NLD | Bo Bo Oo |
| Yangon Region | Seikkyi Kanaungto | NLD | Tin Tun Naing |
| Yangon Region | Seikkan | NLD | Tin Maung Win |
| Yangon Region | Shwepyitha | NLD | Nyan Lin |
| Yangon Region | South Dagon | NLD | Aye Naing |
| Yangon Region | Taikkyi | NLD | Kyaw Myint |
| Yangon Region | South Okkalapa | NLD | Saw Naing |
| Yangon Region | Tamwe | NLD | Win Myint |
| Yangon Region | Thaketa | NLD | Wai Phyo Aung |
| Yangon Region | Thanlyin | NLD | Lwin Ko Lat |
| Yangon Region | Thingangyun | NLD | Shwe Hla (a.k.a. Shwe Hla Win) |
| Yangon Region | Thongwa | NLD | Su Su Lwin |
| Yangon Region | Twante | NLD | Myint Lwin |
| Yangon Region | Yankin | NLD | Zin Mar Aung |
Source: The Myanmar Times

The list of military appointees was published as the UEC Announcement 1/2016.

=== State and Regional Hluttaws ===
There are 644 district seats (out of a total of 864) (Note: Sum of the number of seats for election (644) and for the military (220)) (Note: EODS reported a total of 860.) in the State and Regional Hluttaws, or Local Assemblies, of which 630 were up for election after 14 seats were cancelled due to the ongoing armed insurgencies in Shan State. These figures exclude the 29 elected Ethnic Affairs Ministers, who have different election parameters and their accountability solely to an ethnic electorate, but also sit alongside the elected district and appointed military members of their respective state/region. There are two members are elected for each township of the state/region. The remaining 220 seats (approximately 25% of each assembly) were not elected, and instead reserved for military appointees (taken from Tatmadaw personnel; officially known as "Defence Services Personnel Representatives").

| Party | Seats | +/– |
|---|---|---|
| National League for Democracy | 476 | New |
| Union Solidarity and Development Party | 73 | –411 |
| Shan Nationalities League for Democracy | 25 | +21 |
| Arakan National Party | 22 | +4 |
| Ta'ang National Party | 7 | +3 |
| Pa-O National Organisation | 6 | 0 |
| Kachin State Democracy Party | 3 | New |
| Lisu National Development Party | 2 | New |
| Mon National Party | 2 | New |
| Wa Democratic Party | 2 | +2 |
| Zomi Congress for Democracy | 2 | +2 |
| All Mon Region Democracy Party | 1 | –7 |
| Democratic Party | 1 | –2 |
| Kayin People's Party | 1 | –1 |
| Kokang Democracy and Unity Party | 1 | +1 |
| Lahu National Development Party | 1 | 0 |
| Shan Nationalities Democratic Party | 1 | –30 |
| Tai-Leng Nationalities Development Party | 1 | New |
| Unity and Democracy Party of Kachin State | 1 | –1 |
| Wa National Unity Party | 1 | +1 |
| Other parties | 0 | –27 |
| Independents | 1 | –2 |
| Military appointees | 220 | 0 |
| Vacant | 14 | – |
| Total | 864 | – |
Source: The Irrawaddy, The Myanmar Times,

The list of military appointees was published as the UEC Announcement 3/2016.

==== Ethnic Affairs Ministers ====
29 Ministers of Ethnic Affairs for the State and Regional Assemblies were up for election.

"Under the 2008 Constitution, ethnic affairs ministers are elected to a given state or division if that division is comprised of an ethnic minority population of 0.1 percent or greater of the total populace [roughly 51,400 people]. If one of the country's ethnic minorities counts a state as its namesake, however, it is not granted an ethnic affairs minister (e.g., there is no Mon ethnic affairs minister in Mon State). Only voters who share an ethnic identity with a given ethnic affairs minister post are allowed to vote for candidates to the position." Ministers are not elected for ethnicities that are a majority of their state or region, or where a state/region already has a self-administered region or self-administered division dedicated to those ethnic groups.

| Party | Seats | +/– |
|---|---|---|
| National League for Democracy | 21 | New |
| Union Solidarity and Development Party | 2 | –9 |
| Arakan National Party | 1 | +1 |
| Akha National Development Party | 1 | +1 |
| Lahu National Development Party | 1 | +1 |
| Lisu National Development Party | 1 | +1 |
| Tai-Leng Nationalities Development Party | 1 | New |
| Shan Nationalities League for Democracy | 0 | –1 |
| Other parties | 0 | –6 |
| Independents | 1 | 0 |
| Total | 29 | – |
Source: UEC

Elected Ethnic Affairs Ministers
| Division | Ethnicity | Political Party | Name |
|---|---|---|---|
| Kachin State (4) | Bamar | NLD | Khin Maung Myint (a.k.a. U Dake) |
| Kachin State (4) | Lisu | NLD | Arti Yaw Han |
| Kachin State (4) | Rawang | NLD | Yan Nann Phone |
| Kachin State (4) | Shan | NLD | Sai Sein Lin |
| Kayah State (1) | Bamar | USDP | Hla Myo Swe |
| Kayin State (3) | Bamar | NLD | Taza Htut Hlaing Htwe |
| Kayin State (3) | Pa-O | NLD | Khun Myo Tint |
| Kayin State (3) | Mon | NLD | Min Tin Win |
| Mon State (3) | Bamar | NLD | Shwe Myint |
| Mon State (3) | Kayin | NLD | Aung Myint Khaing |
| Mon State (3) | Pa-O | NLD | San Wint Khaing |
| Rakhine State (1) | Chin | NLD | Pone Bwe |
| Shan State (7) | Akha | ANDP | Are Bay Hla |
| Shan State (7) | Bamar | USDP | Aung Than Maung |
| Shan State (7) | Intha | NLD | Tun Hlaing |
| Shan State (7) | Kachin | Independent | Zote Daung |
| Shan State (7) | Kayan (a.k.a. Padaung) | NLD | Khun Aye Maung |
| Shan State (7) | Lahu | LHNDP | Yaw That |
| Shan State (7) | Lisu | LNDP | Gu Sar |
| Ayeyarwady Region (2) | Kayin | NLD | Gar Moe Myat Myat Thu |
| Ayeyarwady Region (2) | Rakhine | NLD | Tin Saw |
| Bago Region (1) | Kayin | NLD | Naw Pwal Say |
| Magway Region (1) | Chin | NLD | Hla Tun |
| Mandalay Region (1) | Shan | NLD | Sai Kyaw Zaw |
| Sagaing Region (2) | Chin | NLD | Lal Htaung Htan |
| Sagaing Region (2) | Shan | TLNDP | Hmwe Hmwe Khin |
| Tanintharyi Region (1) | Kayin | NLD | Saw Lu Ka |
| Yangon Region (2) | Kayin | NLD | Pan Thinzar Myo |
| Yangon Region (2) | Rakhine | ANP | Zaw Aye Maung |

== Reactions ==
On 9 November 2015, former chairperson of the Union Solidarity and Development Party and Speaker of the Pyithu Hluttaw, Shwe Mann, conceded defeat to the National League for Democracy's Than Nyunt in his hometown constituency of Phyu, announcing on his Facebook that he had 'personally congratulated' his opponent for the victory.

On 9 November 2015, acting chairperson of the Union Solidarity and Development Party, Htay Oo, announced that the party had conceded defeat in a statement to Reuters.

On 11 November 2015, chairperson of the National League for Democracy, Aung San Suu Kyi, called for 'national reconciliation' talks with incumbent president, Thein Sein, commander-in-chief of the Myanmar Armed Forces, Senior General Min Aung Hlaing, and Speaker of the Pyithu Hluttaw, Shwe Mann to be set for a later date. All have accepted her invitation.

On 12 November 2015, incumbent president of Myanmar, Thein Sein, who has led political reforms during his tenure, congratulated Aung San Suu Kyi and her party on his Facebook, promising that his current government will 'respect and obey' the election results and 'transfer power peacefully'. Commander-in-chief of the Myanmar Armed Forces, Senior General Min Aung Hlaing, also took to his Facebook to congratulate Suu Kyi, vowing that the Tatmadaw will co-operate with the new government following the transition. This was after a meeting conducted within the Tatmadaw's top ranks. US president Barack Obama and UN secretary-general Ban Ki-moon congratulated Suu Kyi on her victory and praised Thein Sein for his organisation of the election. Suu Kyi also received calls from French president François Hollande, British prime minister David Cameron, Indian prime minister Narendra Modi and Philippine president Benigno Aquino III.

== Political transition ==
Myanmar's recent political history is underlined by its struggle to establish democratic structures amidst conflicting factions. This political transition from a closely held military rule to a free democratic system is widely believed to be determining the future of Myanmar. The resounding victory of Aung San Suu Kyi’s National League for Democracy in 2015 general elections has raised hope for a successful culmination of this transition.

The 2017 murder of Ko Ni, a prominent Muslim lawyer and a key member of Myanmar’s governing National League for Democracy party and the Rohingya genocide is seen as a serious blow to the country’s fragile democracy. Mr. Ko Ni’s murder has caused fears about the removal of a trusted advisor for Aung San Suu Kyi, particularly in regards to reforming Myanmar’s military-drafted Constitution and ushering the country to democracy.

== Controversy ==
Controversy has been raised over such issues as inaccurate voter lists, cancellation of voting in some violent areas, vilification of Burmese Muslims as a campaign tool, and the ineligibility to vote of the Muslim Rohingyas. According to The Economist, "No matter how many millions of Burmese vote against the Union Solidarity and Development Party, which rules the country and is backed by the army, the army will remain the real power in Myanmar."

There have been allegations of fraud in many townships where unknown ballots cast as advance votes boosted the results of the Union Solidarity Development Party. The Union Election Commission has defended these votes, stating that they had arrived before the polling booths closed, and thus they were legitimate votes. In Lashio, where the National League for Democracy was expected to win, there are allegations of voting fraud which pulled USDP candidate and incumbent vice-president Sai Mauk Kham forward by more than 4,000 votes. The NLD, Shan Nationalities League for Democracy and Shan Nationalities Democratic Party have agreed to file a complaint with the Union Election Commission. The UEC responded by declaring that the victory of Sai Mauk Kham was legal and that no fraud had taken place.
