= Win Aung =

Win Aung or Winn Aung is a Burmese name and may mean:

- Win Aung (businessman), Burmese businessman
- Win Aung (minister), Burmese military officer and politician who served as the 17th Minister of Foreign Affairs from 1998 to 2004
- Win Aung (politician, born 1974), current Pyithu Hluttaw MP for Momauk Township Constituency
- Win Aung (politician, born 1965), current Amyotha Hluttaw MP for Sagaing Region № 3 Constituency
- Winn Aung (MP), current Pyithu Hluttaw MP for Khin-U Township Constituency
- Han Win Aung, a footballer from Myanmar
- Thet Win Aung, (27 August 1971 – 16 October 2006), a Burmese student activist
- Tin Win Aung, a footballer from Myanmar
- Ye Win Aung, a footballer from Myanmar
