= Kyaw Than =

Kyaw Than may refer to:

- Kyaw Than (politician, born 1956), Burmese MP who represents Rakhine State
- Kyaw Than (politician, born 1965), Burmese MP who represents Kayah State
