= Kyaw Swe =

Kyaw Swe is a Burmese name and may mean:

- Kyaw Swe (actor), Burmese actor and film director
- Kyaw Swe (minister), Minister of Home Affairs of Myanmar
- Kyaw Swe (politician), Burmese politician currently serving as a House of Nationalities MP
