= Lu Aye =

Lieutenant General Lu Aye (Burmese: လူအေး) is a Burmese military general and a member to the advisory board of State Administration Council (SAC). He was the commander of Northwestern Command and promoted to lieutenant general in August 2015, during the army chief reshuffle before the 2015 general election.
