= Zin (name) =

Zin (Burmese: ဇင်; MLCTS: aung [zḭna̰]) is a Burmese name.

Notable people with the name include:

- Claudio Zin (born 1945), Italian-Argentine physician and politician
- Eaindra Kyaw Zin (born 1977), Burmese actress and model
- Swe Zin Htet (born 1999), Burmese model
- Irene Zin Mar Myint (born 1990), Burmese pop singer
- Kyaw Zin Phyo (born 1993), Burmese footballer
- A Zin Latt (born 1981), Burmese politician and physician
- Kyaw Zin, Burmese swimmer
- Hernán Zin (born 1971), Argentine-Italian war correspondent, writer, producer and filmmaker
- Swe Zin Htet (born 1999), Burmese model
- Stan Zin (born 1958), Canadian economist
