= Ngwe =

Ngwe may be,

- Ngwe language
- Ngwe Kyun beach
- Htay Ngwe
- Ngwe Gaing
