= Khin Maung Win (politician, born 1958) =

Burmese politician

Member of the Amyotha Hluttaw
- In office 3 February 2016 – 1 February 2021
- Constituency: Sagaing Region № 7

Personal details
- Born: 8 April 1958 (age 68) Wuntho Township, Myanmar
- Party: National League for Democracy
- Spouse: Khin San Yi
- Children: Aung Min Oo
- Parent(s): Gyi Pe (father); Set May (mother)
- Education: Shwebo College (B.Sc); Yangon University (Dip in Livestock)

Khin Maung Win (Burmese: ခင်မောင်ဝင်း; born 8 April 1958) is a Burmese politician who currently serves as an Amyotha Hluttaw MP for Sagaing Region No. 7 constituency. He is a member of the National League for Democracy.

== Early life and education ==
Khin Maung Win was on born 8 April 1958 in Wuntho Township, Myanmar. He graduated with B.Sc. degree from Shwebo Collage and Dip in Livestock from Yangon University. He had served as the chairman of township NLD in 1998 and also served as the chairman of district conference commission. He is an executive member of region and as the chairman of regionvenviromental conservation. He previously worked as a tuition teacher.

== Political career ==
He is a member of the National League for Democracy.In the 2015 Myanmar general election, he was elected as an Amyotha Hluttaw MP and elected representative from Sagaing Region No. 7 constituency.
