= Htay Kywe =

Htay Kywe may refer to:

- Htay Kywe (activist) (born 1968), Burmese pro-democracy activist
- Htay Kywe (politician) (1951–2020), Burmese politician
