= Aung Myo =

Burmese politician

Member of the Amyotha Hluttaw
- Incumbent
- Assumed office 3 February 2016
- Constituency: Sagaing Region № 2
- Majority: 305998 votes

Personal details
- Born: 3 February 1963 (age 63) Shwebo, Myanmar
- Party: National League for Democracy
- Spouse: Aye Aye Win
- Children: Ba Nyar Aung
- Parent(s): Tin Nyut (father); One One (mother)
- Education: Tenth Grade

Aung Myo (Burmese: အောင်မျိုး; born 3 February 1963) is a Burmese politician and former political prisoner, currently serving as Amyotha Hluttaw MP for Sagaing Region № 2 Constituency. He is a member of the National League for Democracy.

== Early life and education ==
Aung Myo was born on 3 February 1963 in Shwebo, Myanmar. His previous job is dealer.

== Political career ==
In 1989–1990, he had served as the secretary of People's Progressive Party at Shwebo Township. In 2004–2012, he served as the joint secretary of the NLD at Shwebo Township. Under Section 505/ B, he was arrested prison to 2 years in 2007. In 2006–2012, he served as a member of the Youth Assistance at Sagaing Region. He is a campaigner of the goal for 2012 elections campaign in 2012. In same year, he served as secretary of District Assembly Election Commission. In 2013, he served as the chairman of Commission for Sagaing Region Youth Conference. At current, he is served as chairman of the Shwebo District NLD.

== Parliamentary career ==
He is a member of the National League for Democracy. In the 2015 Myanmar general election, he was elected as an Amyotha Hluttaw MP, winning a majority of 305998 votes and elected representative from Sagaing Region № 2 parliamentary constituency.
