= Shwe Shwe Sein Latt =

Burmese politician

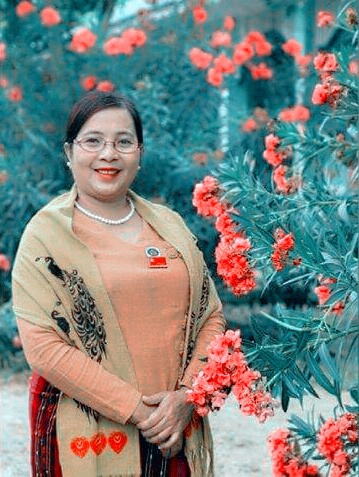

Member of the House of Nationalities
- Incumbent
- Assumed office 3 February 2016
- Constituency: Bago Region № 3
- Majority: 129008 votes

Personal details
- Born: 29 June 1966 (age 59) Taungoo, Myanmar
- Party: National League for Democracy
- Spouse: Soe Moe Aye
- Children: Kaung Htet Zan; Wai Yan Lin Htet
- Parent(s): Tin Shwe (father); Hla Sein (mother)
- Education: B.Sc (Hons) (Geology), M.Sc (Remote Sensing & GIS)

Shwe Shwe Sein Latt (Burmese: ရွှေရွှေစိန်လတ်, born 29 June 1966) is a Burmese politician who currently serves as a House of Nationalities MP for Bago Region No.3 Constituency. She is a member of the National League for Democracy.

== Early life ==
Shwe Shwe was born on 29 June 1966 in Taungoo, Bago Region, Myanmar. She graduated B.Sc (Hons) (Geology), M.Sc (Remote Sensing & GIS). Her previous job is facilitator (Freelance Consultant).

== Political career ==
She is a member of the National League for Democracy Party politician. In the 2015 Myanmar general election, she was elected as Amyotha Hluttaw MP, winning a majority of 129008 votes and elected representative from Bago Region No.3 parliamentary constituency.
