= Hla Oo =

Burmese politician

Member of the Amyotha Hluttaw
- Incumbent
- Assumed office 3 February 2016
- Constituency: Sagaing Region No. 4
- Majority: 325418 votes

Personal details
- Born: 14 October 1957 (age 68) Myinmu Township, Myanmar
- Party: National League for Democracy
- Spouse: Myint Myint Sein
- Children: Thidar Khaing; Aung Chan Thu; Mi Mi Chan
- Parent(s): U Kunt (father); Shwe Ort (mother)
- Education: Mandalay University B.A(Q)

Hla Oo (Burmese: လှဦး; born 14 October 1957) is a Burmese politician and currently serves as an Amyotha Hluttaw MP for Sagaing Region No. 4 constituency. He is a member of the National League for Democracy.

== Early life and education ==
Hla Oo was born on 14 October 1957 in Myinmu Township, Myanmar. He graduated with B.A(Q) from Mandalay University in 1979. He has served as municipal department accountability of Monywa Township and also a Senior lawyer.

== Political career ==
He is a member of the National League for Democracy. In the 2015 Myanmar general election, he was elected as an Amyotha Hluttaw MP, winning a majority of 325481 votes and elected representative from Sagaing Region No. 4 parliamentary constituency.
