= Nyi Nyi Htwe =

Burmese politician

Member of the Amyotha Hluttaw
- Incumbent
- Assumed office 3 February 2016
- Constituency: Sagaing Region № 11

Personal details
- Born: 25 May 1970 (age 55) Paungbyin, Myanmar
- Party: National League for Democracy
- Spouse: San San Tint
- Children: Naygyi Khon Ngone
- Parent(s): Kan Thaung (father); Kyin Nyut (mother)
- Education: ten grade

Nyi Nyi Htwe (Burmese: ညီညီထွေး, also known as Ko Ko Lay; born 25 March 1970) is a Burmese politician who currently serves as an Amyotha Hluttaw MP for Sagaing Region No. 11 constituency. He is a member of the National League for Democracy.

== Early life and career ==
Nyi Nyi Htet was born on 25 March 1970 in Paungbyin l, Myanmar. In 1988, he joined the NLD Party in Paungbyin Township. He had served as a member of the NLD Party Youth, as associate treasurer of Homalin Township NLD reorganization from 2002 to 2003. In 2012, he was a member of the Conference Commission at Hkhamti District and served as the center Conference representative.

== Political career ==
He is a member of the National League for Democracy. In the 2015 Myanmar general election, he was elected as an Amyotha Hluttaw member of parliament and elected representative from Sagaing Region No. 11 parliamentary constituency.
