= Aye Min Han =

Burmese politician

Member of the Amyotha Hluttaw
- Incumbent
- Assumed office 3 February 2016
- Constituency: Mon State № 1
- Majority: 38309 votes

Personal details
- Born: 20 May 1983 (age 43) Mon State, Myanmar
- Party: National League for Democracy
- Parent(s): Tin Win (father); Kyin Than (mother)
- Education: 3rd M.B.B.S, BA(English), Master of Public Administration (Thesis On going), IT fundamental certificate (Renton Technical College, US)

Aye Min Han (Burmese: ဦးအေးမင်းဟန်, born 22 (May 1983) is a Burmese politician who is an Amyotha Hluttaw MP for Mon State No. 1 Constituency.

He is a member of the National League for Democracy. He was born in Mon State. His previous job is trader.

== Political career ==
He is a member of the National League for Democracy. In the 2015 Myanmar general election, he was elected as an Amyotha Hluttaw MP, winning a majority of 38309 votes and elected representative from Mon State No. 1 parliamentary constituency. And then he served as a member of Women's and Children's Rights Committee at Amyotha Hluttaw.
