= Sai Than Naing =

Burmese politician

Member of the Pyithu Hluttaw
- Incumbent
- Assumed office 1 February 2016
- Constituency: Hpapun

Member of the Amyotha Hluttaw
- In office 31 January 2011 – 29 January 2016
- Preceded by: Position established
- Constituency: Kayin State № 5

Personal details
- Born: 22 September 1961 (age 65) Hpapun, Kayin State, Myanmar
- Party: Union Solidarity and Development Party
- Spouse: Naw Moon Lite
- Children: Sai Wint Htoo Lwin
- Parent(s): Chit Khaing (father); Hnin Sein (mother)
- Education: Mawlamyaing Degree College (B.A)
- Occupation: Politician

Sai Than Naing (Burmese: စိုင်းသန်းနိုင်; born 22 September 1961) is a Burmese politician who currently serves as a Member of Parliament in the House of Representatives for Hpapun constituency. He previously served as an Amyotha Hluttaw MP for Kayin State No. 5 constituency.

== Early life and education ==
He was born on 22 September 1961 in Hpapun, Kayin State, Myanmar. He graduated with B.A and B.Ed. He has worked a school teacher.

== Political career ==
He is a member of the Union Solidarity and Development Party. In the 2010 Myanmar general election, he was elected as an Amyotha Hluttaw MP for Kayin State No. 5 constituency.

In the 2015 Myanmar general election, he was elected as a House of Representatives MP for Hpapun constituency.
