= Pe Tin =

Burmese politician

Member of the House of Nationalities
- In office 3 February 2016 – 1 February 2021
- Constituency: Mon State № 6

Personal details
- Born: 16 September 1947 (age 78) Mudon, Mon State, Myanmar
- Party: National League for Democracy
- Education: H.G.P

Pe Tin (Burmese: ဖေတင်, also spelt Phay Tin; born 16 September 1947) is a Burmese politician and former political prisoner, served as an Amyotha Hluttaw MP for Mon State No. 6 Constituency from 2016 to 2021. He is a member of the National League for Democracy politician.

== Early life and education ==
Pe Tin was born on 16 September 1947 in Mudon, Mon State, Myanmar. In 1980, he was a senior lawyer succeeded exam. He was the chairman of Mudon Township National League for Democracy until today from 1988. In July 1997, Under Section 8, the executive 8 members was 6 months of imprisonment.

== Political career ==
He is a member of the National League for Democracy Party politician. In the 2015 Myanmar general election, he was elected as Amyotha Hluttaw representative for Mon State No. 6 parliamentary constituency.
