= Sai Tun Aung =

Burmese politician

Member of the Amyotha Hluttaw
- Incumbent
- Assumed office 1 February 2016
- Constituency: Shan State No.2
- Majority: 79134 votes

Personal details
- Born: 13 October 1963 (age 62) Shan State, Burma (Myanmar)
- Party: Shan Nationalities League for Democracy
- Spouse: Nan Shwe Yin
- Parent: Nan Moon (mother)
- Education: Yangon University B.A (LL.B)

Sai Tun Aung (Burmese: စိုင်းထွန်းအောင်, born 13 October 1963) is a Burmese politician who currently serves as a House of Nationalities member of parliament for Shan State No. 2 constituency. He is a member of Shan Nationalities League for Democracy.

== Early life and education ==
He was born on 13 October 1963 in Shan State, Burma (Myanmar). He graduated with B.A (L.L.B) from Yangon University.

== Political career ==
He is a member of the Shan Nationalities League for Democracy. In the 2015 Myanmar general election, he was elected to the House of Nationalities, winning a majority of the 79,134 votes cast by the Shan State No. 2 parliamentary constituency.
