= Karen National Party =

Karen National Party ကရင်အမျိုးသားပါတီ
- Chairman: Man Thein Shwe
- Secretary-General: Man Kyaw Nyein
- Founded: October 24, 2014
- Headquarters: Insein Township, Yangon Region, Myanmar
- Membership: 5,000+
- Ideology: Federalism; Karen interests
- Colours: Red, white, blue
- Seats in the Amyotha Hluttaw: 0 / 224
- Seats in the Pyithu Hluttaw: 0 / 440
- Seats in the State and Regional Hluttaws: 0 / 880
- Ethnic Affairs Ministers: 0 / 29

Party flag
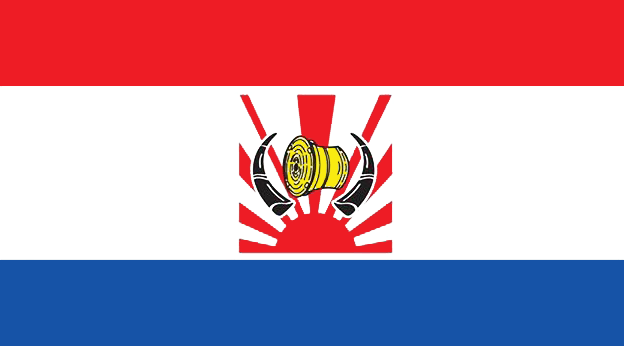

The Karen National Party (S'gaw Karen: ကညီဒီကလုာ်ပၣ်တံၣ်, Burmese: ကရင်အမျိုးသားပါတီ; KNP) is a political party in Myanmar (Burma). The party was registered on 24 October 2014. Despite being based in Yangon, the party only contested constituencies in Kayin State (Karen State) in the 2015 general election. After the government relaxed naming rules in 2012, the party changed its name from the then government approved "Kayin" National Party to the Karen National Party.
