= Federal Union Party =

Federal Union Party ဖက်ဒရယ်ပြည်ထောင်စုပါတီ
- Abbreviation: FUP
- Vice Chairman: Saw Than Myint
- Secretary: Kyaw Zan Thar
- Founded: 8 October 2013
- Preceded by: Nationalities Brotherhood Forum
- Headquarters: No. 73 & 75, Upper Panzaundaung Road, Mingalar Taungnyunt Township, Yangon Region
- Ideology: Federalism
- Seats in the Amyotha Hluttaw: 0 / 224
- Seats in the Pyithu Hluttaw: 0 / 440

Party flag

The Federal Union Party (Burmese: ဖက်ဒရယ်ပြည်ထောင်စုပါတီ; abbreviated FUP) is a political party in Myanmar. The party was formed by sixteen ethnic political parties that were part of the Nationalities Brotherhood Forum (NBF). Its most influential region is Shan State, where it hoped to pose a challenge to the Union Solidarity and Development Party (USDP) and the National League for Democracy (NLD) during the 2015 general election.

Despite its candidates contesting in the 2010 general election (as the NBF), the 2012 by-election, and the 2015 general election, the party has not yet won a single seat. In the 2015 general election, it fielded 37 candidates in Mon and Shan State, and the Ayeyarwady, Magway, Mandalay, Sagaing, and Yangon regions.

== History ==
On 28 October 2013, the Burmese election commission approved the Federal Union Party's application to enter federal politics in Myanmar. The party was established by sixteen members of the Nationalities Brotherhood Forum, which contained most of the country's major ethnic minority political parties. Saw Than Myint, one of 16 founding members and the current Vice Chairman, said that the party was designed to give the National League for Democracy (NLD) and the Union Solidarity and Development Party (USDP) competition in majority Burmese areas of the country.

We don't like the fact that [Burmese] political parties contest in our ethnic minority areas but we can't deter them under democracy. So we have formed this new ethnic party to contest in the seven [Burmese] regions; we've already agreed that the central executive committee will feature 25 or 30 members and 16 parties can be involved proportionally in it.

— U Saw Than Myint

All notable ethnic minorities in Myanmar are represented in the party, with the exception of the Jingpo people.
