= Naw Christ Tun =

Burmese politician

Member of the Amyotha Hluttaw
- Incumbent
- Assumed office 1 February 2016
- Constituency: Kayin State No. 7
- Majority: 14617 votes

Personal details
- Born: 8 December 1963 (age 62) Thandaunggyi Township, Myanmar
- Party: National League for Democracy
- Domestic partner: Sai Maung Ann
- Parent(s): Saw Nay Tun (father); Naw Awkalo (mother)
- Education: B.V.S
- Occupation: Politician

Naw Christ Tun (Burmese: နော်ခရစ္စထွန်း also known as Arkar Moe; born 8 December 1963) is a Burmese politician who currently serves as an Amyotha Hluttaw MP for Kayin State No. 7 constituency. She is a member of National League for Democracy.

== Early life and education ==
Naw was born on 8 December 1963 in Thandaunggyi Township, Kayin State, Myanmar. She is an ethnic Karen. She graduated with B.V.S.

== Political career ==
She has served as the chairman of National League for Democracy of Thandaunggyi Township. In the 2015 Myanmar general election, she was elected as an Amyotha Hluttaw MP for Kayin State No. 7 parliamentary constituency, winning a majority of 14617 votes. She also serves as the member of Amyotha Hluttaw's Hluttaw Rights Committee.
