= Shan State Kokang Democratic Party =

The Shan State Kokang Democratic Party (Burmese: ရှမ်းပြည်ကိုးကန့်ဒီမိုကရက်တစ်ပါတီ; SSKDP) was a political party in Myanmar.

== History ==
Following the reintroduction of multi-party democracy after the 8888 Uprising, the party contested two seats in the 1990 general elections. It received 0.05% of the vote, winning one seat; U Yankyin Maw in Kunlong.

The party re-registered on 31 August 2012, and contested the 2015 general election, but failed to win a seat.

The SSKDP was deregistered by the Union Election Commission on 20 November 2023 for having failed to recruit at least 1,000 members after the party re-registered in May of that year.
