= Naung Na Jatan =

Burmese politician

Member of the Amyotha Hluttaw
- In office 3 February 2016 – 1 February 2021
- Constituency: Kachin State № 4
- Majority: 5731 votes

Personal details
- Born: 5 September 1956 (age 69) Tanai, Myanmar
- Party: National League for Democracy
- Spouse: Shayaw Htu Sam
- Children: 8
- Parent: Naung Na Zaw Gan (father)
- Education: seven grade

Naung Na Jatan (Burmese: နောင်နဂျတန်, born 5 September 1956) is a Burmese politician who currently serves as an Amyotha Hluttaw MP for Kachin State No. 4 constituency. He is a member of the National League for Democracy.

== Early life and education ==
Naung Na Jatan was born on 5 March 1956 in Tanai, Kachin State, Myanmar. He is an ethnic Kachin. His former work is as a farmer.

== Political career ==
He is a member of the National League for Democracy. In the 2015 Myanmar general election, he was elected as an Amyotha Hluttaw MP, winning a majority of 5731 votes and an elected representative from Kachin State No. 4 parliamentary constituency.
