= Kyaw Myint Oo =

Burmese politician

Member of the Amyotha Hluttaw
- Incumbent
- Assumed office 1 February 2016
- Constituency: Mandalay Region No.10

Personal details
- Born: 12 March 1974 (age 52) Lewe, Burma (Myanmar)
- Party: National League for Democracy
- Spouse: Tin Thwe Thwe Moe
- Parent(s): Maung Kyaw (father), Myint (mother)
- Education: Yezin Agricultural University

Kyaw Myint Oo (Burmese: ကျော်မြင့်ဦး, born 12 March 1974) is a Burmese politician who currently serves as an Amyotha Hluttaw MP for Mandalay Region No. 10 Constituency. He is a member of National League for Democracy.

== Early life and education ==
He was born on 12 March 1974 in Lewe, Mandalay Region, Burma (Myanmar). He graduated with B.Agr.Sc from Yezin Agricultural University.

== Political career ==
He is a member of the National League for Democracy. In the 2015 Myanmar general election, he was elected as an Amyotha Hluttaw MP and elected representative from Mandalay Region No. 10 parliamentary constituency.
