= Nwe Nwe Aung =

Burmese politician

Member of the Amyotha Hluttaw
- Incumbent
- Assumed office 3 February 2016
- Constituency: Mon State № 2
- Majority: 35181 votes

Personal details
- Born: 29 September 1956 (age 70) Dawei, Myanmar
- Party: National League for Democracy
- Spouse: Myint Thein
- Children: Kyaw Si Thu Myint; Phyu Phyu Khaing
- Parent(s): Thein Aung (father); Thein Myint (mother)
- Education: Yangon University

Nwe Nwe Aung (Burmese: နွယ်နွယ်အောင်, born 29 September 1956) is a Burmese politician and lawyer who currently serves as an Amyotha Hluttaw MP for Mon State No. 2 constituency. She is a member of the National League for Democracy.

== Early life and career ==
Nwe Nwe Aung was born on 29 September 1956 in Mawlamyaing, Mon State, Myanmar. She graduated with B.A (L.L.B) from Yangon University.

From 1976 to 1980, she had worked as a senior lawyer. From 1980 to present, she worked a lawyer of the Supreme Court of Myanmar. She had served as chairman of executive at NLD Mawlamyaing in 2012. And then, she had served as the executive member of Mawlamyaing Lawyers Association from 1988 to 2015 and as vice-chairman of association in 2015.

== Political career ==
She is a member of the National League for Democracy. In the 2015 Myanmar general election, she was elected as an Amyotha Hluttaw MP, winning a majority of 35181 votes and elected representative from Mon State No. 2 parliamentary constituency.
