= Kyaw Thaung =

Burmese politician (born 1949)

Member of the Amyotha Hluttaw
- Incumbent
- Assumed office 3 February 2016
- Constituency: Sagaing Region № 1
- Majority: 209486 votes

Personal details
- Born: 9 May 1949 (age 76) Sitee Village, Sagaing Township, Myanmar
- Party: National League for Democracy
- Spouse: May Yi Myint
- Children: Zaw Minn Oo; Nay Chi Linn; Minn Kyaw Soe
- Parent(s): Aye Pe (father); Shwe Sein (mother)
- Education: B.Sc (Chemistry)

Kyaw Thaung (Burmese: ကျော်သောင်း, born 9 May 1949) is a Burmese politician and former political prisoner who currently serves as an Amyotha Hluttaw MP for Sagaing Region No. 1 Constituency. He is a member of the National League for Democracy.

== Early life and education ==
Kyaw Thaung was born on 9 May 1949 in Sitee Village, Sagaing Township, Myanmar. He graduated with a B.Sc. degree in chemistry from Mandalay University. His previous job was at a youth computer centre.

In 1996, Kyaw Thuang was arrested and sentenced to 7 years with hard labor under Section 5 for his criticism of the SLORC National Democratic committee. In 2003, he was arrested for the second time in relation to the Tabayin uprising at Monywa prison.

== Political career ==
Kyaw Thuang is a member of the National League for Democracy. In the 2015 Myanmar general election, he was elected as an Amyotha Hluttaw MP, winning a majority of 209486 votes and elected representative from Sagaing Region No. 1 parliamentary constituency.
