= Nan Moe Moe Htwe =

Burmese politician

Member of the Amyotha Hluttaw
- Incumbent
- Assumed office 3 February 2016
- Constituency: Kayin State № 4
- Majority: 11414 votes

Personal details
- Born: 11 June 1983 (age 43) Hlaingbwe, Myanmar
- Party: National League for Democracy
- Parent(s): Htwe Maung (father); Shwe Done (mother)
- Education: Hpa-an University (M.Sc Zoology)

Nan Moe Moe Htwe (Burmese: နန်းမိုးမိုးထွေး; born 11 June 1983) is a Burmese politician who currently serves as an Amyotha Hluttaw MP for Kayin State No. 4 Constituency. She is a member of National League for Democracy.

== Early life and education ==
She was born on 11 June 1983 in Hlaingbwe, Myanmar. She is an ethnic Karen. She graduated with M.Sc. (Zoology) from Hpa-An University.

== Political career ==
She is a member of the National League for Democracy. In the 2015 Myanmar general election, she was elected as an Amyotha Hluttaw MP, winning a majority of 11,414 votes and elected representative from Kayin State No.4 parliamentary constituency.
