= Soe San Thet Tun =

Burmese politician and physician

Member of the Pyithu Hluttaw
- Incumbent
- Assumed office 3 February 2016
- Constituency: Myinmu

Personal details
- Born: 1 June 1985 (age 40) Myinmu Township, Sagaing Region Myanmar
- Party: National League for Democracy
- Parent(s): Than Tun (father); Khin Sein (mother)
- Education: Monyaw University (B.A Hist); University of Traditional Medicine, Mandalay (Dip.T.Med)

Soe San Thet Tun (Burmese: စိုးစံသက်ထွန်း, born 1 June 1985) is a Burmese politician and physician who is a Pyithu Hluttaw MP for Myinmu Constituency. He is a member of the National League for Democracy.

== Early life and education ==
Soe San Thet Tun born 1 June 1985 in Myinmu Township, Sagaing Region, Myanmar. He graduated with B.A (Hist:) from Monyaw University and Dip.T.Med (Mdy) from University of Traditional Medicine, Mandalay. His previously worked as a trader. He had served as executive member of NLD Sagaing district.

== Political career ==
He is a member of the National League for Democracy. In the 2015 Myanmar general election, he was elected as a Pyithu Hluttaw MP and elected representative from Myinmu parliamentary constituency.
