= Ye Htut (politician, born 1942) =

Burmese politician

Member of the Amyotha Hluttaw
- Incumbent
- Assumed office 3 February 2016
- Constituency: Sagaing Region No. 5
- Majority: 227437 votes

Personal details
- Born: 20 March 1942 (age 84) Yangon, Myanmar
- Party: National League for Democracy
- Spouse: Myint Myint Thein
- Children: Nanda Htut; Kyaw Swar Htut
- Parent(s): Ba Chit (father); Ma Ma Latt (mother)
- Education: Yangon Institute of Economics (B.Ecom)

Ye Htut (Burmese: ရဲထွဋ်; born 20 March 1942) is a Burmese politician who currently serves as an Amyotha Hluttaw MP for Sagaing Region No. 5 constituency. He is a member of the National League for Democracy.

== Early life and education ==
Ye Htut was born on 20 March 1942 in Yangon, Myanmar. He graduated with B.Ecom from Yangon Institute of Economics. He is also a writer.

== Political career ==
He is a member of the National League for Democracy. In the 2015 Myanmar general election, he was elected as an Amyotha Hluttaw member of parliament, winning a majority of 227437 votes and elected representative from Sagaing Region No. 5 parliamentary constituency.
