= Khin Maung Myint (politician, born 1951) =

Burmese politician

Member of the Amyotha Hluttaw
- Incumbent
- Assumed office 3 February 2016
- Constituency: Kachin State № 9
- Majority: 30825 votes

Personal details
- Born: 28 December 1951 (age 74) Katha, Myanmar
- Party: National League for Democracy
- Spouse: Hkaung Dun
- Parent(s): Thakhin Ba Khin (father); San Yin (mother)
- Education: ten grade

Khin Maung Myint also Maung Cho (Burmese: ခင်မောင်မြင့်; born 28 December 1951) is a Burmese politician currently serves as an Amyotha Hluttaw MP for Kachin State No. 9 constituency. He is a member of the National League for Democracy.

== Early life and education ==
He was born on 28 December 1951 in Katha, Sagaing Region, Myanmar. His previous job is jade trading.

== Political career ==
He is a member of the National League for Democracy. In the 2015 Myanmar general election, he was elected as an Amyotha Hluttaw MP, winning a majority of 30825 votes and elected representative from Kachin State No. 9 parliamentary constituency.
