= Sai Thant Zin =

Burmese politician

- စိုင်းသန့်ဇင်

Member of the Pyithu Hluttaw
- Incumbent
- Assumed office 3 February 2016
- Constituency: Hsipaw

Personal details
- Born: 13 August 1965 (age 61) Taikkyi Township, Myanmar
- Party: Shan Nationalities League for Democracy
- Spouse: Nan Ehlaik
- Parent(s): Tun Hla (father); Sein Hmone (mother)
- Education: Yangon University
- Occupation: Politician

Sai Thant Zin (Burmese: စိုင်းသန့်ဇင်; born 13 August 1965) is a Burmese politician who currently serves as a Pyithu Hluttaw member of parliament for the Hsipaw constituency. He is a member of the Shan Nationalities League for Democracy.

== Early life and education ==
An ethnic Shan, Thant Zin was born on 13 August 1965 in Taikkyi Township, Myanmar. He graduated with a B.Sc. (Maths) from Yangon University.

== Political career ==
A member of the Shan Nationalities League for Democracy, Thant Zin was elected a Pyithu Hluttaw MP from the Hsipaw constituency.
