= Naw Sar Mu Htoo =

Burmese politician

Naw Sar Muu Htoo

Member of the Amyotha Hluttaw
- Incumbent
- Assumed office 1 February 2016
- Constituency: Kayin State No. 11

Personal details
- Born: 11 November 1935 (age 90) Kyainseikgyi, Kayin State, Myanmar
- Party: National League for Democracy
- Spouse: Nan Hla Shin
- Parent(s): Saw Pale Htee (father); Naw Borar (mother)
- Occupation: Politician

Naw Sar Muu Htoo (Burmese: နော်ဆာမူထူး, born 11 November 1953) is a Burmese politician, currently serves as an Amyotha Hluttaw MP for Kayin State No. 11 Constituency. She is a member of the National League for Democracy.

== Early life and education ==
Htoo was born on 11 November 1953 in Kyainseikgyi, Kayin State, Burma. She is an ethnic Karen.

== Political career ==
Htoo is a member of the National League for Democracy. In the 2015 Myanmar general election, she was elected as an Amyotha Hluttaw MP from Kayin State No. 11 parliamentary constituency. She also serves as the member of the Amyotha Hluttaw's Farmer Affairs Committee.
