= Naing Ko Ko =

Burmese politician

- နိုင်ကိုကို

Member of the House of Nationalities
- In office 3 February 2016 – 1 February 2021
- Constituency: Kachin State № 12
- Majority: 31058 votes

Personal details
- Born: 5 July 1980 (age 45) Shwegu Township, Kachin State
- Party: National League for Democracy
- Relations: Sein Maung (father)
- Occupation: Politician

Naing Ko Ko (Burmese: နိုင်ကိုကို; born 5 July 1980) is a Burmese politician who currently serves as a House of Nationalities member of parliament for Kachin State № 12 Constituency. He is a member of the National League for Democracy.

== Early life and education ==
Naing Ko Ko was born in Shwegu Township, Kachin State on 5 July 1980. He graduated M.P. from Government Technical Institute, Monywa and B.Sc (Chemistry) from Shwebo University. His former job was Water industry.

== Political career ==
He is a member of the National League for Democracy Party. He was elected as an Amyotha Hluttaw MP, winning a majority of 31058 votes and elected representative from Kachin State No. 12 parliamentary constituency.
