= Kyaw Minn =

Burmese politician

Member of the House of Representatives
- Incumbent
- Assumed office 3 February 2016
- Constituency: Letpadan Township

Personal details
- Born: 20 June 1961 (age 65) Kannarsu Village, Letpadan Township, Myanmar
- Party: National League for Democracy
- Spouse: Kyi Kyi San
- Children: Aye Myat Thu; Hsu Thazin
- Parent(s): U Chit (father); Mya Kyin (mother)
- Education: Yangon University (B.Sc Maths)
- Occupation: Politician

Kyaw Minn (Burmese: ကျော်မင်း, also spelt Kyaw Min; born 20 June 1961) is a Burmese politician who currently serves as a Pyithu Hluttaw member of parliament for Letpadan Township. He is a member of the National League for Democracy. In the 2015 Myanmar general election, he contested the Letpadan Township constituency for a seat in the Pyithu Hluttaw MP, the country's lower house.

== Early life and education ==
Kyaw Minn was born on 20 June 1961 in Kannarsu Village, Letpadan Township, Bago Region. He graduated with B.Sc (Maths) from Yangon University. His former work is millers.

== Political career ==
He is a member of the National League for Democracy Party, he was elected as a Pyithu Hluttaw MP elected representative from Letpantan parliamentary constituency.
