= Maung Maung Latt =

Burmese politician

Member of the Amyotha Hluttaw
- Incumbent
- Assumed office 3 February 2016
- Constituency: Sagaing Region № 9

Personal details
- Born: 24 November 1942 (age 83) Tamu, Myanmar
- Party: National League for Democracy
- Spouse: San San Win
- Children: Yu Wadi Maung Latt
- Parent(s): Thein Aung (father); Pyae Tin (mother)
- Education: Monywa College (B.Sc, Hons); Mandalay University (M.Sc (Thesis), Zoology)

Maung Maung Latt (Burmese: မောင်မောင်လတ်; born 25 November 1966) is a Burmese politician and currently serves as Amyotha Hluttaw MP for Sagaing Region № 9 constituency. He is a member of the National League for Democracy.

== Early life and career ==
Maung Maung Latt was born on 25 November 1966 in Tamu Township, Myanmar. He graduated with B.Sc (Hons) from Monywa College in 1987 and M.Sc (Thesis) Zoology from Mandalay University in 1994.

From 1995 to 2004, he worked as a tuition teacher in Tamu Township. He has given a free education to more than 200 students from 1995 to present. He wrote poems in translate English at The Light Of English magazines by his pen named Maung Maung Latt 3D. He had been written translate articles at Nwe Ni magazine, The New Style magazine and The International Magazine by his pen named Maung Maung Zaw Latt 3D Ko Latt (Gaung Htoo San).

== Political career ==
He is a member of the National League for Democracy. In the 2015 Myanmar general election, he was elected as an Amyotha Hluttaw MP and elected representative from Sagaing Region № 9 parliamentary constituency.
