= Khin Ma Gyi =

Burmese politician

Member of the Amyotha Hluttaw
- Incumbent
- Assumed office 3 February 2016
- Constituency: Kachin State № 8
- Majority: 25580 votes

Personal details
- Born: 25 April 1952 (age 74) Monywa, Sagaing Region, Myanmar
- Party: National League for Democracy
- Spouse: Hla Win
- Children: 2
- Parent(s): Maung Maung (father); San San (mother)
- Education: University of Medicine, Mandalay (M.B.B.S)

Khin Ma Gyi (Burmese: ခင်မကြီး, born 25 April 1952) is a Burmese politician and physician currently serves as an Amyotha Hluttaw MP for Kachin State No. 8 constituency. She is a member of the National League for Democracy.

== Early life and education ==
She was born on 25 April 1952 in Monywa, Sagaing Region, Myanmar. She graduated with M.B.B.S. from University of Medicine, Mandalay.

== Political career ==
She is a member of the National League for Democracy. In the 2015 Myanmar general election, she was elected as an Amyotha Hluttaw MP, winning a majority 25580 vote and elected representative from Kachin State No. 8 parliamentary constituency.
