= Win Aung (politician, born 1965) =

Burmese politician

Member of the Amyotha Hluttaw
- Incumbent
- Assumed office 3 February 2016
- Constituency: Sagaing Region № 3
- Majority: 236167 votes

Personal details
- Born: 22 December 1965 (age 60) Kanbalu Township, Myanmar
- Party: National League for Democracy
- Spouse: Aye Aye Khaing
- Children: Min Thuya Aung
- Parent(s): U Kyi (father); Mya Thein (mother)
- Education: B.A (Q)
- Alma mater: Shwebo University

Win Aung (Burmese: ဝင်းအောင်; born 22 December 1965) is a Burmese politician. He serves as an Amyotha Hluttaw MP for Sagaing Region No. 3 Constituency. He is a member of the National League for Democracy.

== Early life and education ==
Win Aung was born on 22 December 1965 in Kanbalu Township, Myanmar. He graduated BA from Shwebo University. He was previously a farmer.

== Career ==
He had served as a student leader for the pro-democracy uprising in the Kanbalu Township in 1988 and also a member of sa.magga of All Burma Students (Upper Myanmar). In 1988–1989, he served as the township NLD youth and executive member.

He was a campaigner of the goal for 2012 elections campaign.

He served as the chairman of Commission for Kanbalu Township Youth Conference, as District Executive Secretary, as trainer of Environmental Conservation and the National Youth Training.

Win Aung was arrested and sentenced to 4 years imprisonment from military court with Unlawful Act (17/1) because he had communication with All Burma Students' Democratic Front. He was detained for four months.

=== Parliament ===
He is a member of the National League for Democracy. In the 2015 Myanmar general election, he was elected as an Amyotha Hluttaw MP, won with a majority of 236,167 votes and elected as a representative from Sagaing Region No. 3 parliamentary constituency.
