= Win Zaw =

Burmese politician and painter

- ဝင်းဇော်

Member of the House of Nationalities
- Incumbent
- Assumed office 3 February 2016
- Constituency: Kachin State № 7

Personal details
- Born: 12 May 1982 (age 43) Nant Mon Village, Mohnyin Township, Kachin State
- Party: National League for Democracy
- Parent(s): Than Nyunt (father); Khin Shwe (mother)

Win Zaw (Burmese: ဝင်းဇော်; born 12 May 1982) is a Burmese politician and painter who currently serves as a House of Nationalities member of parliament for Kachin State № 7 constituency. He is a member of the National League for Democracy.

== Early life and education ==
Win Zaw was born in Nantmon Village, Mohnyin Township, Kachin State on 12 May 1982. He graduated with B.A. (Painting), PGDA-Painting from Mandalay University. He worked as a painter for his living.
