= A Zin Latt =

Burmese politician and physician

Member of the Pyithu Hluttaw
- Incumbent
- Assumed office 3 February 2016
- Constituency: Shwebo

Personal details
- Born: 18 January 1981 (age 45) Kanbalu Township, Myanmar
- Party: National League for Democracy
- Education: University of Medicine, Mandalay (M.B.B.S)

A Zin Latt (Burmese: အေဇင်လတ်, also known as Kay Kay (or) Kay Zin Latt; born 18 January 1981) is a Burmese politician and physician currently serving as a Pyithu Hluttaw MP for Shwebo constituency. She is a member of the National League for Democracy.

== Early life and education ==
Latt was born on 18 January 1981 in Kanbalu Township, Myanmar. She graduated with M.B.B.S from University of Medicine, Mandalay. Her previous job is doctor.

== Political career ==
She is a member of the National League for Democracy. In the 2015 Myanmar general election, she was elected as a Pyithu Hluttaw MP and elected representative from Shwebo constituency.
