= Soe Moe =

Burmese politician

- စိုးမိုး

Member of the House of Nationalities
- Incumbent
- Assumed office 3 February 2016
- Constituency: Ayeyarwady Region № 1
- Majority: 171354 votes

Personal details
- Born: 31 July 1979 (age 47) Pathein, Myanmar
- Party: National League for Democracy
- Parent(s): Mya Win (father); Khin Cho Lwin (mother)
- Education: Technological University, Pathein

Soe Moe (Burmese: စိုးမိုး; born 31 July 1974) is a Burmese politician who currently serves as a House of Nationalities member of parliament for Ayeyarwady Region № 1 constituency. He is a member of the National League for Democracy.

== Early life and education ==
Soe Moe was born in Pathein on 31 July 1974. He studied Technological University, Pathein and graduated with L.L.B, C.B.L, AGTI (MP). Then, he worked lawyer of the Supreme Court of Myanmar.

== Political career ==
He is a member of the National League for Democracy Party, he was elected as an Amyotha Hluttaw MP, winning a majority of 171354 votes and elected representative from Ayeyawady Region № 1 parliamentary constituency.
