= Win Aung (politician, born 1974) =

Burmese politician

- ဝင်းအောင်

Member of the Pyithu Hluttaw
- Incumbent
- Assumed office 3 February 2016
- Constituency: Momauk Township

Personal details
- Born: 13 June 1974 (age 52) Mogaung
- Party: National League for Democracy
- Parent: Han Maung (father)

Win Aung (Burmese: ဝင်းအောင်; born 13 June 1974) is a Burmese politician who currently serves as a Pyithu Hluttaw member of parliament for Momauk Township Constituency. He is a member of the National League for Democracy.

== Early life and education ==
Win Aung was born in Mogaung Township, Kachin State on 13 June 1974. He graduated B.Sc (Zoology) from Myitkyina University. His former work is Tuition teacher.
