= Saw Sein Tun =

Burmese politician

- စောစိန်ထွန်း

Member of the House of Nationalities
- Incumbent
- Assumed office 3 February 2016
- Constituency: Kayah State № 4
- Majority: 10030 votes

Personal details
- Born: 9 December 1962 (age 63) Demoso Township, Kayah State
- Party: National League for Democracy
- Relations: Htoo Aung (father)
- Occupation: Politician

Saw Sein Tun (Burmese: စောစိန်ထွန်း; born 9 December 1962) is a Burmese politician who currently serves as a House of Nationalities member of parliament for Kayah State № 4 constituency. He is a member of the National League for Democracy.

== Early life and education ==
Saw Sein Tun was born in Demoso Township, Kayah State on 9 December 1962. He is an ethnic Kayah. He graduated from Ywar Thit Gyi Development Institute. Previous employment is Education (Retd).

== Political career ==
A member of the National League for Democracy Party, he was elected as an Amyotha Hluttaw MP, winning a majority of 10030 votes, from Kayah State No. 4 parliamentary constituency.
