= Ma Ma Lay (politician) =

Burmese politician

Member of the House of Nationalities
- Incumbent
- Assumed office 3 February 2016
- Constituency: Shan state № 8
- Majority: 40334 votes

Personal details
- Born: 7 February 1962 (age 64) Pindaya, Shan State, Myanmar
- Party: National League for Democracy
- Parent(s): Phoe Khwar (father); Nan Kyin (mother)
- Education: BSc (Chemistry)

Ma Ma Lay (Burmese: မမေလး; born 7 February 1962) is a Burmese politician who currently serves as an Amyotha Hluttaw member of parliament for Shan State No.8 Constituency. She is a member of the National League for Democracy.

== Early life and education ==
Ma Ma Lay was born on 7 February 1962 in Pindaya, Shan State, Myanmar. She is an ethnic Danu. She graduated with BSc Chemistry from Yangon University. Her former work is as a farmer.

== Political career ==
She is a member of the National League for Democracy. She was elected as an Amyotha Hluttaw MP, winning a majority of 40334 votes and elected representative from Shan State No. 8 parliamentary constituency.
