= Cin Khan Pau =

Burmese politician

House of Nationalities representative
- In office 3 February 2016 – 1 February 2021
- Constituency: Chin State № 6

Personal details
- Born: 19 August 1955 (age 70) Funwan, Tedim Township, Chin State
- Party: Union Solidarity and Development Party
- Parent: King Kaw Houk (father)
- Education: B.Sc degree Mandalay University (1977-1980); B.Ed degree Yangon Institute of Education (1983-1984)

Cin Khan Pau (Burmese: ကျင့်ခန့်ပေါင်, also spelled Cin Kham Pau; born 19 August 1955) is a Burmese politician currently serving as a House of Nationalities MP for Chin State No. 6 constituency. In 1980, he graduated from Mandalay University and in 1984, graduated from Yangon Institute of Education.

== Early life and education ==
Cin Khan Pau was born in Phunom Village, Tedim Township, Chin State on 19 August 1955. He graduated B.Sc and B.Ed degrees and served as a deputy director of Ministry of Education.

== Political career ==
He is a member of the Union Solidarity and Development Party. He was elected representative from Chin State No. 6 parliamentary constituency.
