= Sai Pan Pha =

Burmese politician

- စိုင်းပန်ဖ

Member of the House of Nationalities
- Incumbent
- Assumed office 3 February 2016
- Constituency: Kayah State № 12

Personal details
- Born: 12 July 1977 (age 48) Loikaw, Kayah State, Myanmar
- Party: Union Solidarity and Development Party (1998-2010); National League for Democracy
- Spouse: Aye Aye Myaing
- Parent(s): Saw Thein Kyaw (father); Aye Nyunt (mother)
- Occupation: Politician

Sai Pan Pha (Burmese: စိုင်းပန်ဖ; born 12 July 1977) is a Burmese politician who serves as a House of Nationalities member of parliament for Kayah State № 12 constituency. He is a member of the National League for Democracy.

== Early life and education ==
He was born on 12 July 1977 in Loikaw, Kayah State, Myanmar. He is an ethnic Karen. He graduated with B.A. (geography) from distance education at Taunggyi University. His former work is trader. He is a former member of the Union Solidarity and Development Party from 1998 to 2010.

== Political career ==
He is a member of the National League for Democracy. He was elected as an Amyotha Hluttaw representative from Kayah State № 12 parliamentary constituency.
