= Kyaw Htwe =

Burmese politician (born 1968)

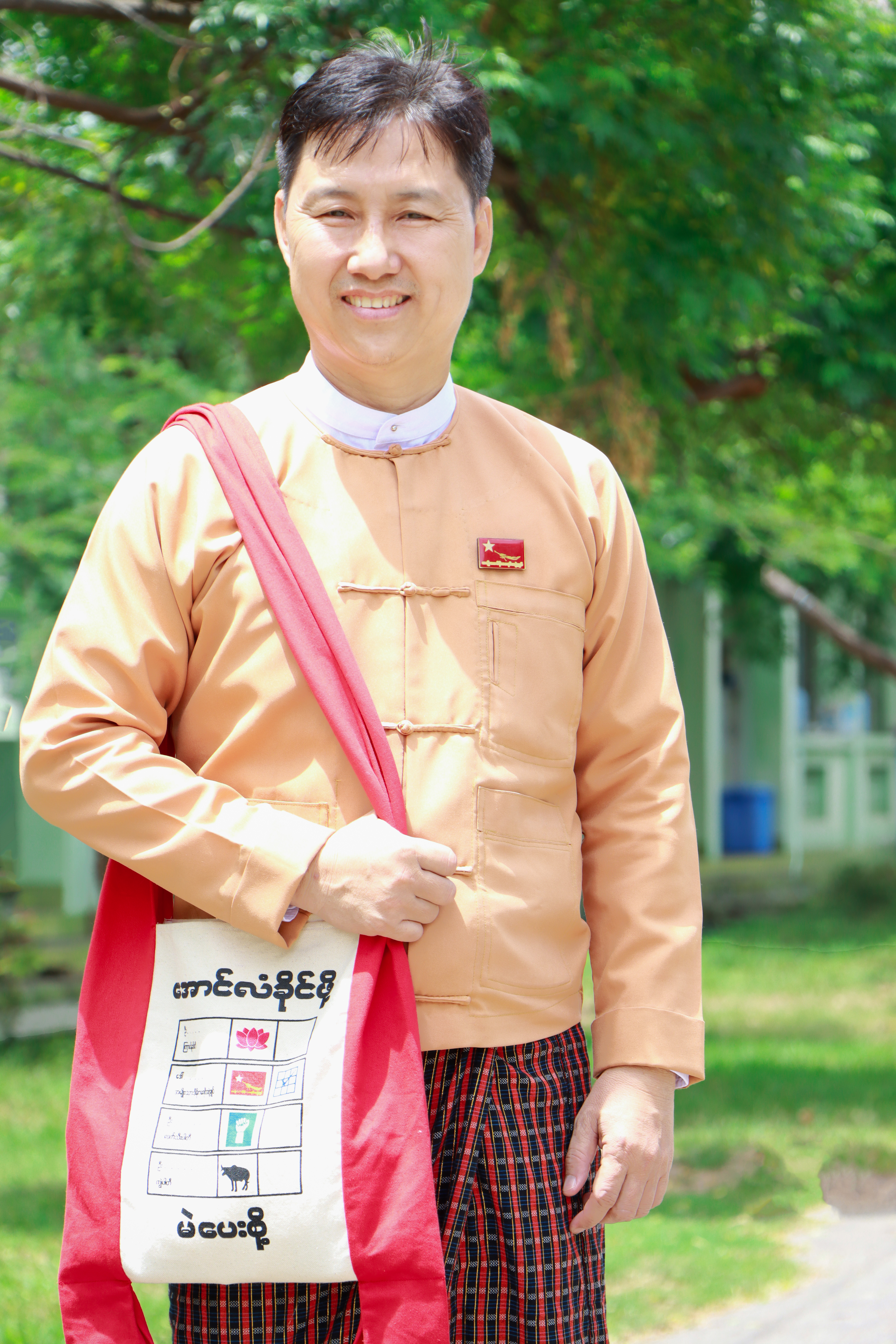
- Kyaw Htwe in 2020

House of Nationalities representative
- In office 3 February 2016 – 1 February 2021
- Constituency: Yangon Region № 8

Personal details
- Born: 27 May 1968 (age 58) Thakayta Township, Myanmar
- Party: National League for Democracy
- Spouse: Zun San Pwint
- Parent(s): Myint Thein (father); Daw Kyi (mother)
- Education: Yangon University

Kyaw Htwe (Burmese: ကျော်ထွေး, born 27 May 1968) is a Burmese politician who served as a House of Nationalities member of parliament for Yangon Region No. 8 constituency.

== Early life and education ==
Born in 1968 to U Myint Thein and Daw Kyi (aka) Daw Kon Kyi, in Tharkayta Township, Yangon Region. Upon finishing high school, he joined University of Yangon to study bachelor program in mathematics.

== 8888 Uprising and aftermath ==
Kyaw Htwe was a Year 3 student during 8888 Uprising, and he took part as the president of Tharkayta Township Student Union, as well as member of Burma Youth Liberation Front (BYLF). In 1990, he was sentenced for 7 years, under article (17/1), due to these involvements. After release from prison, he set up his own business in 2000. In 2011, he became part of executive committee of campaigns to release all political prisoners and functioned as part of steering committee for society related to this issue.

== Political career ==
Kyaw Htwe joined National League of Democracy (NLD) in March 2012 and was delegated as Ayeyarwady Region Campaign focal for 2012 Myanmar by-elections, and coordinator for the party's education network. As of 2020, Kyaw Htwe is still active in NLD as the President of Tharkayta Township NLD, Central Committee Member, and Vice President of Central Labour Affairs Committee. He was also active in peace process as part of political parties cluster for Union Peace Dialogue Joint Committee (UPDJC).

Over this period, Kyaw Htwe was also a member of Yangon Region (Southern District) Inquiry Committee for Resolving Land Grabbing and Other Lands Issues and worked to reclaim land, and/or to get proper compensation, in accordance with regulations for those whom fall prey to land-grabbing. In 2020 Myanmar General Elections, NLD party entrusted Kyaw Htwe to be part of Central Campaign Committee. In 2015 Myanmar General Election, he won the contention for Member of Parliament (MP) at Amyotha Hluttaw, by representing NLD at Constituency No. 8, Yangon Region (covering townships of Dala, Seikkyi Kanaungto, Twantay, Kawhmu, Kungyangon and Cocokyun). As a member of parliament, he got elected as President of Amyotha Hluttaw Committee on Immigration and Myanmar Internal and Migrant Workers, and focused on related affairs between 2015 – 2020. In a related note, he proposed two draft law amendments as well as new draft law on domestic helpers. In this tenure, he is also President of Myanmar – Japan Parliamentary Friendship Association.

As the President of Parliamentary Committee focusing on labour affairs, Kyaw Htwe mediated many labour issues, including labour disputes and strikes.

Additionally, as an MP, Kyaw Htwe strived for the development of his constituency, specifically in terms of improving road-access, electrification, water, sanitation and hygiene, waterways conservation, establishment of research centers for agriculture and livestock industries, etc. by coordinating with relevant stakeholders. He also raised key issues in the parliament by asking 9 questions of high importance (starred questions), 5 questions of normal importance (non-starred questioned) and 2 suggestions towards the Union Government. Starting from 2016, he has been also working for Public Accounts Committee, as the Deputy Chairperson of Group (4). He is also a member of joint committee to draft amendments to the 2008 Constitution of Myanmar.
