= Soe Win (politician, born 1957) =

Burmese politician and political prisoner

Member of the Amyotha Hluttaw
- Incumbent
- Assumed office 1 February 2016
- Constituency: Rakhine State No.12

Personal details
- Born: 22 October 1957 (age 68) Gwa, Rakhine State, Burma (Myanmar)
- Party: National League for Democracy
- Parent(s): Lay Maung (father); Thaung Yin (mother)
- Education: Yangon University B.A (Philosophy)

Soe Win (Burmese: စိုးဝင်း, born 22 October 1957) is a Burmese politician and former political prisoner who currently serves as an Amyotha Hluttaw MP for Rakhine State No. 12 constituency. He is a member of National League for Democracy.

== Early life and education ==
He was born on 22 October 1957 in Gwa, Rakhine State, Burma (Myanmar). He graduated with B.A. (Philosophy) from Yangon University. He was joined NLD at 1989 and served responsibilities of township and state. And then, He was involved in NLD Central Affairs Committee Responsibilities, Youth Reading Clubs and Religious Organizations. In 1974, Soe Win was arrested and sentenced to seven years prison because he was involved in the U Thant uprising of poster campaign at Gwa Township. After four months, he was freed by appeal.

== Political career ==
He is a member of the National League for Democracy. In the Myanmar general election, 2015, he was elected as an Amyotha Hluttaw MP and elected representative from Rakhine State No. 12 parliamentary constituency.
