= Confederate Farmers Party =

Confederate Farmers Party မဟာမိတ်တောင်သူလယ်သမားပါတီ
- Abbreviation: CFP
- Chairman: U San Lin
- Secretary-General: Than Han
- Vice Chairman: Tin Aye
- Founded: 2 July 2015
- Dissolved: 20 August 2019
- Headquarters: No. 2626, Inn Win-4th Street, Nandawyar Ward, Bago Region, Myanmar
- Ideology: Agrarianism; Multi-party democracy

Party flag
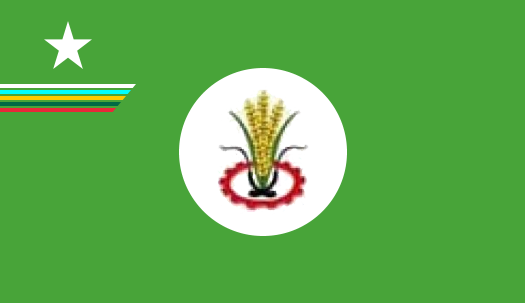

The Confederate Farmers Party (Burmese: မဟာမိတ်တောင်သူလယ်သမားပါတီ) was a political party in Myanmar registered with the Union Election Commission (UEC). It was founded on 2 July 2015 by a group of farmers in Bago Region. The party stated that its objective was to lift the socio-economic pressure placed on farmers by the Burmese government, and that it would work with any other organisation or political party that shared its goals and values.

The UEC announced on 20 August 2019 that the party had dissolved due to internal disputes.
