= Thet Win Aung =

Burmese student activist

- သက်ဝင်းအောင်
- Ko Thet Win Aung
- Born: 27 August 1971; Yangon, Myanmar
- Died: 16 October 2006 (aged 35); Mandalay, Myanmar
- Occupation: student

Thet Win Aung (သက်ဝင်းအောင် [θɛʔ wɪ́ɰ̃ àʊɰ̃]; 27 August 1971 – 16 October 2006) was a Burmese student activist, as well as a martyr and hero in the Burmese democracy movement.

He took part in the 1988 Movement as one of the leading members of his high school student union, Tamwe Township. In 1989, he was elected vice general secretary of the Basic Education Student Union (BESU). He was dismissed from his school for his political involvement in student demonstrations, later jailed for 9 months for aiding in forming the Student Union.

In 1994, the military intelligence tried to arrest him again because he published the All Burma Federation of Student Unions pamphlets and organized student demonstrations to commemorate the 32nd anniversary of 7 July Protests. Although he escaped, his home was searched frequently and his family was harassed incessantly while he was on his run. There is no evidence that he took part in the 1996 student demonstrations from behind the scenes nor that he helped organized the student protests against the poor quality of education and students' rights in 1998, yet the military accused him of this. Thet Win Aung was in hiding for a long period after the 1988 demonstrations, but he managed to migrate into Thailand, where he lived for a period of time. He was persuaded, however, to return to Burma. He was arrested in October 1998, brutally tortured, and eventually sentenced to 59 years in prison. At first, he was detained in Kalay Prison, Sagaing Division. He was moved to Khamti Prison, and transferred to the Mandalay Prison at 2004.

Whilst in prison, he and his fellow prisoners of conscience were subjected to inhumane torture and withheld proper medical treatment. By placing him in Mandalay Prison, he was kept as far away from his family as possible. His father never missed a prison visit for either Thet Win Aung or his brother, Pyone Cho, who was also a prisoner of conscience. Thet Win Aung died in Mandalay prison on 16 October 2006 due to inhumane treatment and long-term injuries he sustained from torture during interrogations with military intelligence. The prison authorities would not allow for an autopsy and insisted that he died for malaria, rather than torture, although many fellow prisoners could testify the extent to which Thet Win Aung was tortured and abused in the interrogation centers and prisons.

Thet Win Aung was elected Honorary Vice-President of the Reading University Students' Union after being adopted as their Amnesty International Group's prisoner.

Thet Win Aung's brother, Pyone Cho (also known as Htay Win Aung), is also an internationally recognized human rights activist and was one of the main student leaders of the 1988 Uprising. Like Thet Win Aung, Pyone Cho spent his entire adult life advocating for democracy, spending 20 years as a prisoner of conscience.
