= Sai Lone San Khat =

Burmese politician

Member of the Amyotha Hluttaw
- Incumbent
- Assumed office 1 February 2016
- Constituency: Shan State No.7
- Majority: 56229 votes

Personal details
- Born: 13 March 1965 (age 61) Tachileik, Burma (Myanmar)
- Party: National League for Democracy
- Spouse: Nan Si Wan
- Parent(s): San Khat (father); Nan Sho (mother)
- Education: Third Year History

Sai Lone San Khat (Burmese: ဦးစိုင်းလုံစံခတ, born 13 March 1965) is a Burmese politician who currently serves as a House of Nationalities member of parliament for Shan State No. 7 constituency.

== Early life and education ==
He was born on 13 March 1965 in Tachileik, Shan State, Burma (Myanmar).

== Political career ==
He is a member of the National League for Democracy. In the Myanmar general election, 2015, he was elected as an Amyotha Hluttaw MP and elected representative from Shan State No. 7 parliamentary constituency.
