= Winn Aung (politician, born 1958) =

Burmese politician

Member of the Pyithu Hluttaw
- Incumbent
- Assumed office 3 February 2016
- Constituency: Khin-U

Personal details
- Born: 15 October 1958 (age 67) Kanbalu Township, Sagaing Division, Myanmar
- Party: National League for Democracy
- Spouse: Khin Than Nu
- Children: Ei Nandar Aung
- Parent(s): Khin Aung (father); Set Ti (mother)
- Education: University of Medicine, Mandalay (M.B.B.S.)

Winn Aung (Burmese: ဝင်းအောင်, also spelt Win Aung, born 15 October 1958) is a Burmese politician, physician and former political prisoner who currently serves as a Pyithu Hluttaw MP for the Khin-U constituency. He is a member of the National League for Democracy.

== Early life and education ==
Winn Aung was born on 15 October 1958 in Kanbalu Township, Myanmar. In 1982, he graduated from the University of Medicine, Mandalay with an M.B., B.S. degree.

== Political career ==
In the 2015 Myanmar general election, he was elected to Pyithu Hluttaw as an MP from the Khin-U constituency. He currently serves as a member in the Government Commitments Assessment Committee in the Pyithu Hluttaw.
