= Kyaw Swe (politician) =

Burmese politician

- ကျော်ဆွေ

Member of the House of Nationalities
- In office 3 February 2016 – 1 February 2021
- Constituency: Magway Region № 11

Personal details
- Born: 1 December 1960 (age 65) Myaing, Myanmar
- Party: National League for Democracy
- Spouse: Khin Mya Win
- Parent(s): Kyaw Than (father); Ohn Si (mother)

Kyaw Swe (Burmese: ကျော်ဆွေ; born 1 December 1979) is a Burmese politician who currently serves as a House of Nationalities member of parliament for Magway Region No. 11 constituency. He is a member of the National League for Democracy.

== Early life and education ==
Kyaw Swe was born in Myaing, Magway Region, Myanmar on 1 December 1960. He graduated with B.A (Myanmar). His former work is School teacher.

== Political career ==
He is a member of the National League for Democracy Party politician. In the 2015 Myanmar general election, he was elected as Amyotha Hluttaw representative from Magway Region No. 11 parliamentary constituency.
