= Zarni Min =

Burmese politician

Member of the House of Representatives
- Incumbent
- Assumed office 3 February 2016
- Constituency: Shwegu Township

Personal details
- Born: 20 March 1975 (age 51) Shwegu, Myanmar
- Party: National League for Democracy
- Spouse: San San Win
- Parent(s): Kyin Maung Win (father); Tin Tin Mya (mother)

Zarni Min (Burmese: ဇာနည်မင်း, also spelt Zarni Minn; born 30 March 1975) is a Burmese politician who currently serves as a Pyithu Hluttaw member of parliament for Shwegu Township.

== Early life and education ==
Zarni Min was born on 20 March 1975 in Shwegu, Kachin State, Myanmar. He graduated with B.A. (Philosophy-Q), (Dip in International Relation), (Dip in Political Management) from Mandalay University and Rangoon University. His previous job was as a merchant.

== Political career ==
He is a member of the National League for Democracy Party, he was elected as Pyithu Hluttaw representative for Shwegu parliamentary constituency.
