= Min Swe Naing =

Burmese politician

- မင်းဆွေနိုင်

Member of the House of Nationalities
- In office 3 February 2016 – 1 February 2021
- Constituency: Kachin State № 6
- Majority: 278282 votes

Personal details
- Born: 29 January 1970 (age 56) Nant Kham Village, Mohnyin Township, Kachin State
- Party: National League for Democracy
- Parent(s): Ngwe Thaung (father); Tin Yi (mother)
- Occupation: Politician

Min Swe Naing (Burmese: မင်းဆွေနိုင်; born 29 January 1970) is a Burmese politician who currently serves as a House of Nationalities member of parliament for Kachin State № 6 constituency. He is a member of the National League for Democracy.

== Early life and education ==
Min Swe Naing was born in Nang Kham Village, Mohnyin Township, Kachin State on 12 January 1970. He is an ethnic Shan. He graduated B.Sc., zool from Myintkyina College in 1993.

== Political career ==
He is a member of the National League for Democracy Party, he was elected as an Pyithu Hluttaw MP, winning a majority of 15,367 votes and elected representative from kachin State No. 6 parliamentary constituency.
