= Htay Ngwe =

Burmese politician

National Unity Government
- Deputy Minister for Home Affairs and Immigration
- Assumed office 30 March 2026
- Appointed by: Committee Representing Pyidaungsu Hluttaw
- Leader: Lwin Ko Latt

Member of the Pyithu Hluttaw
- In office 3 February 2016 – 1 February 2021
- Constituency: Myaung

Personal details
- Born: 10 August 1970 (age 56) Myaung, Myanmar
- Party: National League for Democracy
- Spouse: Hnin Si
- Children: La Pyae Thit; Kyalsin Thway
- Parent(s): Kan Myaing (father); Tin Mya (mother)
- Education: Yangon Institute of Economics (B.Ecom)

Htay Ngwe (Burmese: ဌေးငွေ; born 10 August 1970) is a Burmese politician and former political prisoner currently serving as deputy minister for Home Affairs and Immigration of National Unity Government since March 2026.

He was a Pyithu Hluttaw MP for Myaung Constituency. He is a member of the National League for Democracy.

== Early life and education ==
Htay Ngwe was born on 10 August 1970 in Myaung Township, Myanmar. He graduated with B.com from Yangon Institute of Economics. His former work is farmer.

== Political career ==
He is a member of the National League for Democracy. In the 2015 Myanmar general election, he was elected as a Pyithu Hluttaw MP and elected representative from the Myaung parliamentary constituency.

On 30 March 2026, the Committee Representing Pyidaungsu Hluttaw appointed him as deputy minister for Home Affairs and Immigration of National Unity Government.
