= Thein Lwin =

Burmese politician

- သိန်းလွင်

Member of the House of Nationalities
- Incumbent
- Assumed office 3 February 2016
- Constituency: Kachin State No. 10
- Majority: 31065 votes

Personal details
- Born: 8 February 1957 (age 69) Bhamo Township, Kachin State
- Party: National League for Democracy
- Relations: U Maw (father)
- Occupation: Politician

Thein Lwin (Burmese: သိန်းလွင်; born 8 February 1957) is a Burmese politician who currently serves as a House of Nationalities member of parliament for Kachin State No. 10 Constituency. He is a member of the National League for Democracy.

== Early life and education ==
Thein Lwin was born in Bhamo Township, Kachin State on 8 February 1957. He graduated Law LL.B from Yangon University. Then, he worked lawyer of the Supreme Court of Myanmar.

== Political career ==
He is a member of the National League for Democracy Party. He was elected as an Amyotha Hluttaw MP, winning a majority of 31065 and elected representative from Kachin State No. 10 parliamentary constituency.
