= Kyaw Than (politician, born 1965) =

Burmese politician

Member of the Amyotha Hluttaw
- Incumbent
- Assumed office 1 February 2016
- Constituency: Kayah State No.8
- Majority: 1636 votes

Personal details
- Born: 31 May 1965 (age 61) Kayah State, Burma (Myanmar)
- Party: Union Solidarity and Development Party
- Spouse: Aye Mya
- Parent(s): Ko Lay (father); Mya O (mother)
- Education: B.A. (History)

Kyaw Than (Burmese: ကျော်သန်း, born 31 May 1965) is a Burmese politician who currently serves as a House of Nationalities member of parliament for Kayah State № 8 constituency.

== Early life and education ==
He was born on 31 May 1965 in Kayah State, Burma (Myanmar). He graduated with B.A. (History) at Zee Pin Gyi.

== Political career ==
He is a member of the Union Solidarity and Development Party. In the Myanmar general election, 2015, he was elected as an Amyotha Hluttaw MP, winning a majority of 1636 votes and elected representative from Kayah State № 8 parliamentary constituency.
