= Shan Nationalities League for Democracy =

Shan Nationalities League for Democracy ရှမ်းတိုင်းရင်းသားများ ဒီမိုကရေစီအဖွဲ့ချုပ်
- Tai name: ငဝ်ႈငုၼ်းတီႇမူဝ်ႇၶရေႇၸီႇၸိူဝ်ႉၶိူဝ်းတႆး
- Burmese name: ရှမ်းတိုင်းရင်းသားများ ဒီမိုကရေစီအဖွဲ့ချုပ်
- Abbreviation: SNLD
- Chairperson: Sai Nyunt Lwin
- 1st Vice-Chairperson: Hkam Pöng Fa (Khin Maung Nyunt)
- 2nd Vice-Chairperson: Sai Hla Pe
- General Secretary: Sai Leik
- Founded: 26 October 1988 (37 years ago)
- Headquarters: Pyay Road, Ward 5, Mayangone Township, Yangon Region
- Ideology: Shan interests Federalism (Myanmar); Self-determination; Social democracy
- Political position: Centre-left
- Regional affiliation: Network of Social Democracy in Asia
- International affiliation: Progressive Alliance
- Slogan: "Without equality we cannot have peace; without peace we cannot build a democracy."
- Seats in the Shan State Hluttaw: 28 / 151
- Seats in the Kachin State Hluttaw: 1 / 53

Party flag

Website
- www.snld.info

The Shan Nationalities League for Democracy (Burmese: ရှမ်းတိုင်းရင်းသားများ ဒီမိုကရေစီ အဖွဲ့ချုပ်; [ʃáɰ̃ táɪɰ̃jɪ́ɰ̃ðámjá dìmòkəɹèsì ʔəpʰwḛdʑoʊʔ]; Shan: ငဝ်ႈငုၼ်းတီႇမူဝ်ႇၶရေႇၸီႇၸိူဝ်ႉၶိူဝ်းတႆး; abbreviated as SNLD) is a de-registered political party in Myanmar (Burma). The party was established on 26 October 1988, and campaigns for the interests of the Shan people. The SNLD became the largest Shan party in the Assembly of the Union following the 2015 general election. The party is a federal party having local branches in most townships in Shan State and few in other states and regions such as Kayah, Kachin, and Mandalay.

Unlike other Shan political parties, the party prefers a federal system with eight states or eight units to have equal political rights in upper house as the original principle based on the Federal Principles of 1961, rather than the status quo of seven states and seven regions.

== History ==
The Shan Nationalities League for Democracy was founded by Hkun Htun Oo, the nephew of Sao Kya Seng, the last Saopha of the Hsipaw State. The party was formally registered in 1988. In the 1990 general election, the party won the second highest number of seats (23 seats out of 58 constituencies), which was unrecognized by the ruling military junta.

From 1993 and 1996, members of the party attended the National Convention (NC) and Dialogue, where several opposition groups met with the military junta to negotiate peace treaties. There, the SNLD demanded "striving for national reconciliation in order to build a genuine democratic union". However, the Working Committee of the National Convention Convening Commission ignores SNLD's demands as well as other democratic forces. When the National Convention re-convened again in 2004, SNLD denied to send representatives joining the Convention. In February 2005, the party's leaders were arrested under accused charges on forming Shan State Advisory Expert Group, and were given long prison sentences.

The party had been openly against the 2008 constitution, and it boycotted the 2010 general election, along with other opposition parties, such as the National League for Democracy and its alliance members United Nationalities Alliance (UNA). Following that the party was de-registered under the new Union Election Commission of Myanmar in 2010. In 2012, following constitutional and government reforms, political prisoners, including the leaders of the SNLD, were released, and the SNLD was permitted to operate legally and re-register for elections.

In the 012 by-election, the party did not contest. Instead, SNLD took outside parliament's path working on peace process and national reconciliation. In November 2012, SNLD cooperating with other Shan political parties, cease-fire armed groups and Shan civil society organizations, took its first initiative convening a three-day conference of "Trust Building for Peace" aiming to seeking solutions, building trust among different groups to achieve genuine peace.

In March 2013, SNLD along with other ethnic political parties, cease-fired armed groups in Shan State and Kayah State organized another three days conference of Trust Building for Peace, Shan State & Kayah State in Lashio, Shan State projecting to figure out the common grounds, understanding among others. Similarly to that, in late 2013, the party collaborating other democratic forces such as ethnic political parties, cease-fired armed groups and civil society organization organize its third conference of Trusting Building for Peace, Shan, Kayah, and Mon State.

The SNLD went on to run successfully in the 2015 election, winning three seats in the Amyotha Hluttaw, 12 seats in the Pyithu Hluttaw and 25 seats in the State and Regional Hluttaws (24) in the Shan State Hluttaw, and one in the Kachin State Hluttaw). This makes the SNLD the fourth largest political party elected to the Pyidaungsu Hluttaw (Assembly of the Union) and the fifth largest overall. Many SNLD gains in the election took place at the expense of the Shan Nationalities Democratic Party, which was reduced from being the second largest party in Shan State and the third largest party nationally, to holding only a single seat in the Shan State Hluttaw.

In the aftermath of the 2021 Myanmar coup d'état, the SNLD strongly condemned the military coup as a rejection of the country’s commitment to a democratic transition, and against the ongoing peace and trust building process. It rejected the military junta's offer to join the State Administration Council at the state level. In March 2023, the SNLD announced it would not re-register to participate in the military junta's planned elections. On 28 March, SNLD was officially dissolved by the junta-appointed Union Election Commission, along with 39 other parties.
