= Htay Kywe (politician) =

Burmese politician (1951–2020)

Member of the Amyotha Hluttaw
- In office 1 February 2016 – 2 May 2020
- Constituency: Yangon Region No. 1
- Majority: 27030 votes

Personal details
- Born: 7 July 1951 Yangon, Myanmar
- Died: 2 May 2020 (aged 68)
- Party: National League for Democracy
- Parent: Aunt Kyawe (father)

Htay Kywe (Burmese: ဌေးကြွယ်, 7 July 1951 – 2 May 2020) was a Burmese politician who served as an Amyotha Hluttaw member of parliament for the Yangon Region No. 1 constituency. He was a member of the National League for Democracy.

== Early life and education ==
Htay Kywe was born on 7 July 1951 in Yangon, Myanmar. He graduated with a M.B.B.S from the University of Medicine 1, Yangon.

== Political career ==
Htay Kywe was elected as an Amyotha Hluttaw MP, winning a majority of the 27,030 votes from the Yangon Region No. 1 parliamentary constituency.
