= Shwebo University =

Coordinates: 22°35′30″N 95°43′30″E

- ရွှေဘို တက္ကသိုလ်
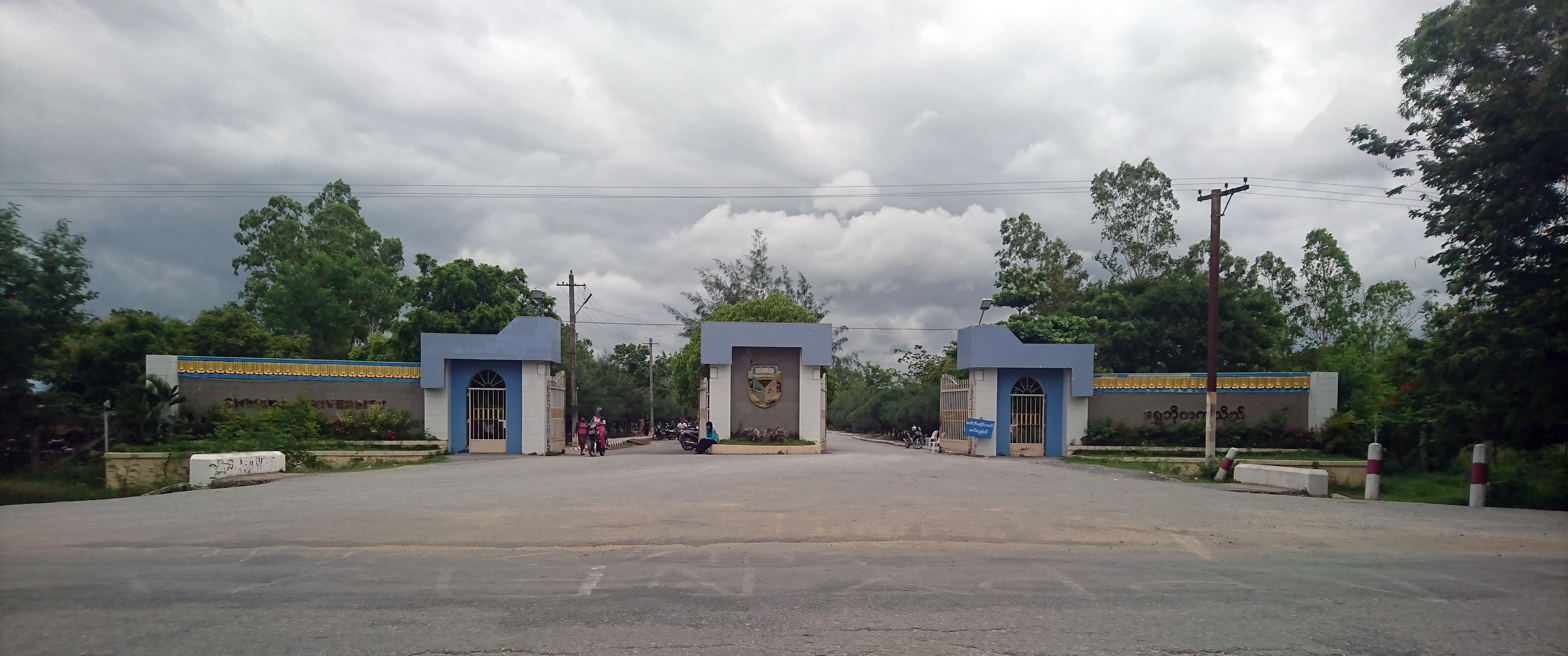
- Entrance gate of Shwebo University
- Former name: Shwebo Regional College (1977)
- Type: Public
- Established: 1977; 49 years ago
- Rector: Dr.Win Swae
- Location: Shwebo; Sagaing Region, Myanmar
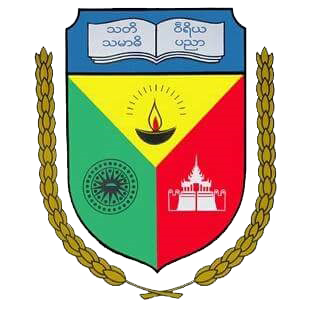

Shwebo University (Burmese: ရွှေဘို တက္ကသိုလ်) is a public liberal arts university in Shwebo, Myanmar. The university offers bachelor's and master's degree programs in common liberal arts and sciences.

== History ==
Shwebo University was established as Shwebo Regional College, an affiliated college of Mandalay College (now Mandalay University) in 1977. It was named Shwebo College in 1980, and Shwebo Degree College in 1999. In 2011, it was upgraded as Shwebo University.

== Programs ==
Classified as an Arts and Science university in the Burmese university education system, Shwebo University offers bachelor's and master's degree programs in common liberal arts and sciences disciplines. Its regular Bachelor of Arts (BA) and Bachelor of Science (BSc) take four years to complete and honours degree programs BA (Hons) and BSc (Hons) take five years..

Program	Bachelor's	Master's
Myanmar	BA, BA (Hons)	MA
English	BA, BA (Hons)	
Oriental Studies	BA, BA (Hons)	MA
Geography	BA, BA (Hons)	MA
History	BA, BA (Hons)	MA
Philosophy	BA, BA (Hons)	MA
Botany	BSc, BSc (Hons)	MSc
Chemistry	BSc, BSc (Hons)	MSc
Mathematics	BSc, BSc (Hons)	MSc
Physics	BSc, BSc (Hons)	MSc
Zoology	BSc, BSc (Hons)	MSc
Geology	BSc, BSc (Hons)	MSc
