= Chief ministers of states and regions of Myanmar =

Chief executive of each regional government of Myanmar

Chief Ministers of the States and Regions of the Republic of the Union of Myanmar
- တိုင်းဒေသကြီးနှင့်ပြည်နယ် ဝန်ကြီးချုပ်များ
- State Seal of Myanmar

- Style: H.E.
- Type: Heads of the sub-governments
- Member of: State and Region Hluttaws
- Reports to: President of Myanmar
- Nominator: President of Myanmar
- Appointer: President of Myanmar
- Term length: 5 years
- Constituting instrument: Constitution of Myanmar
- Formation: 30 March 2011

The Region Chief Minister (Burmese: တိုင်းဒေသကြီးဝန်ကြီးချုပ်) or State Chief Minister (Burmese: ပြည်နယ်ဝန်ကြီးချုပ်) serves as the chief executive of each of the respective regional or state governments of Myanmar. According to the Constitution of Myanmar, the Chief Minister is responsible for forming the state and regional governments, and for signing and promulgating bills approved by the State and Region Hluttaws.

== Qualifications ==
Chief Ministers must be at least 35 years old and meet the eligibility criteria for Pyithu Hluttaw representatives. They are appointed by the President of Myanmar. Chief Ministers must be selected from representatives of the respective regional or state assemblies as prescribed in the constitution, although a notable exception to this ruling was the appointment of General Maung Maung Ohn as the Chief Minister of Rakhine State in June 2014.

== Government office ==
The Region or State Administration Department functions as the Region or State government. The Region or State Department of General Administration is also the office of the Region or State Mission.

== Current chief ministers ==
Region or State	Name	Start Date	Political Party
Kachin State	U Khet Htein Nan	1 August 2021	Union Solidarity and Development Party
Kayah State	U Arnt Maw	10 April 2026	Union Solidarity and Development Party
Kayin State	U Saw Myint Oo	1 August 2021	Union Solidarity and Development Party
Chin State	Dr. Vungh Suan Thang	19 August 2022	Union Solidarity and Development Party
Sagaing Region	U Ko Lay	10 April 2026	Union Solidarity and Development Party
Taninthayi Region	U Zaw Naing Oo	10 April 2026	Union Solidarity and Development Party
Bago Region	U Myo Swe Win	1 August 2021	Union Solidarity and Development Party
Magway Region	U Tin Ko Ko	10 April 2026	Union Solidarity and Development Party
Mandalay Region	U Myo Aung	1 February 2023	Union Solidarity and Development Party
Mon State	U Aung Win Than	10 April 2026	Tatmadaw
Rakhine State	U Naing Oo	10 April 2026	Union Solidarity and Development Party
Yangon Region	U Aung Naing Thu	10 April 2026	Union Solidarity and Development Party
Shan State	U Sai Htein Soe	10 April 2026	Union Solidarity and Development Party
Ayeyarwady Region	U Aye Kyaw	10 April 2026	Union Solidarity and Development Party

== List of chief ministers ==
=== Kachin State ===
No.	Name	Picture	Took office	Left office	Time in office	Political Party	Appointer
1	U La John Ngan Hsai		30 March 2011	30 March 2016	5 years, 0 days	Union Solidarity and Development Party	U Thein Sein
2	Dr. Khet Aung		30 March 2016	1 February 2021	4 years, 308 days	National League for Democracy	U Htin Kyaw
3	U Khet Htein Nan		1 August 2021	Incumbent	5 years, 76 days	Union Solidarity and Development Party	U Min Aung Hlaing

=== Kayah State ===
No.	Name	Picture	Took office	Left office	Time in office	Political Party	Appointer
1	U Khin Maung Oo (aka) U Bu Yal		30 March 2011	30 March 2016	5 years, 0 days	Union Solidarity and Development Party (until 2015)	U Thein Sein
2	U L Phaung Sho		30 March 2016	3 September 2020	4 years, 157 days	National League for Democracy	U Htin Kyaw
3	U Khin Maung Oo (aka) U Bu Yal		1 August 2021	31 January 2022	183 days	Independent	U Min Aung Hlaing
4	U Zaw Myo Tin		1 February 2022	30 December 2025	3 years, 332 days	Tatmadaw	U Min Aung Hlaing
5	U Sein Oo		30 December 2025	10 April 2026	101 days	Independent	U Min Aung Hlaing
6	U Arnt Maw		10 April 2026	Incumbent	189 days	Union Solidarity and Development Party	U Min Aung Hlaing

=== Kayin State ===
No.	Name	Picture	Took office	Left office	Time in office	Political Party	Appointer
1	U Zaw Min		30 March 2011	25 August 2015	4 years, 148 days	Tatmadaw	U Thein Sein
2	Daw Nann Khin Htway Myint		30 March 2016	1 February 2021	4 years, 308 days	National League for Democracy	U Htin Kyaw
3	U Saw Myint Oo		1 August 2021	Incumbent	5 years, 76 days	Union Solidarity and Development Party	U Min Aung Hlaing

=== Chin State ===
No.	Name	Picture	Took office	Left office	Time in office	Political Party	Appointer
1	U Hong Ngai		30 March 2011	30 March 2016	5 years, 0 days	Union Solidarity and Development Party	U Thein Sein
2	U Salai Lian Lwal		30 March 2016	1 February 2021	4 years, 308 days	National League for Democracy	U Htin Kyaw
3	U Ngun San Aung		1 August 2021	19 August 2022	1 year, 18 days	Union Solidarity and Development Party	U Min Aung Hlaing
4	Dr. Vungh Suan Thang		19 August 2022	Incumbent	4 years, 58 days	Union Solidarity and Development Party	U Min Aung Hlaing

=== Sagaing Region ===
No.	Name	Picture	Took office	Left office	Time in office	Political Party	Appointer
1	U Tha Aye		30 March 2011	30 March 2016	5 years, 0 days	Union Solidarity and Development Party	U Thein Sein
2	Dr. Myint Naing		30 March 2016	1 February 2021	4 years, 308 days	National League for Democracy	U Htin Kyaw
3	U Myat Kyaw		1 August 2021	10 April 2026	4 years, 252 days	Union Solidarity and Development Party	U Min Aung Hlaing
4	U Ko Lay		10 April 2026	Incumbent	189 days	Union Solidarity and Development Party	U Min Aung Hlaing

=== Tanintharyi Region ===
No.	Name	Picture	Took office	Left office	Time in office	Political Party	Appointer
1	U Khin Zaw		30 March 2011	6 January 2012	282 days	Union Solidarity and Development Party	U Thein Sein
2	U Myat Ko		27 January 2012	30 March 2016	4 years, 63 days	Union Solidarity and Development Party	U Thein Sein
3	Dr. Lei Lei Maw		30 March 2016	11 March 2019	2 years, 346 days	National League for Democracy	U Htin Kyaw
4	U Myint Maung		22 March 2019	1 February 2021	1 year, 316 days	National League for Democracy	U Win Myint
5	U Myat Ko		1 August 2021	10 April 2026	4 years, 252 days	Union Solidarity and Development Party	U Min Aung Hlaing
6	U Zaw Naing Oo		10 April 2026	Incumbent	189 days	Union Solidarity and Development Party	U Min Aung Hlaing

=== Bago Region ===
No.	Name	Picture	Took office	Left office	Time in office	Political Party	Appointer
1	U Nyan Win		30 March 2011	30 March 2016	5 years, 0 days	Union Solidarity and Development Party	U Thein Sein
2	U Win Thein		30 March 2016	1 February 2021	4 years, 308 days	National League for Democracy	U Htin Kyaw
3	U Myo Swe Win		1 August 2021	Incumbent	5 years, 76 days	Union Solidarity and Development Party	U Min Aung Hlaing

=== Magway Region ===
No.	Name	Picture	Took office	Left office	Time in office	Political Party	Appointer
1	U Phone Maw Shwe		30 March 2011	30 March 2016	5 years, 0 days	Union Solidarity and Development Party	U Thein Sein
2	Dr. Aung Moe Nyo		30 March 2016	1 February 2021	4 years, 308 days	National League for Democracy	U Htin Kyaw
3	U Tint Lwin		1 August 2021	10 April 2026	4 years, 252 days	Union Solidarity and Development PartyMilitary	U Min Aung Hlaing
4	U Tin Ko Ko		10 April 2026	Incumbent	189 days	Union Solidarity and Development PartyMilitary	U Min Aung Hlaing

=== Mandalay Region ===
No.	Name	Picture	Took office	Left office	Time in office	Political Party	Appointer
1	U Ye Myint		30 March 2011	30 March 2016	5 years, 0 days	Union Solidarity and Development Party	U Thein Sein
2	Dr. Zaw Myint Maung		30 March 2016	1 February 2021	4 years, 308 days	National League for Democracy	U Htin Kyaw
3	U Maung Ko		1 August 2021	1 February 2023	1 year, 184 days	Union Solidarity and Development Party	U Min Aung Hlaing
4	U Myo Aung		1 February 2023	Incumbent	3 years, 257 days	Union Solidarity and Development Party	U Min Aung Hlaing

=== Mon State ===
No.	Name	Picture	Took office	Left office	Time in office	Political Party	Appointer
1	U Ohn Myint		30 March 2011	30 March 2016	5 years, 0 days	Union Solidarity and Development Party	U Thein Sein
2	U Min Min Oo		30 March 2016	23 February 2017	330 days	National League for Democracy	U Htin Kyaw
3	Dr. Aye Zan		1 March 2017	1 February 2021	3 years, 337 days	National League for Democracy	U Htin Kyaw
4	U Zaw Lin Htun		1 August 2021	1 February 2023	1 year, 184 days	Independent	U Min Aung Hlaing
5	U Aung Kyi Thein		1 February 2023	10 April 2026	3 years, 68 days	Union Solidarity and Development Party	U Min Aung Hlaing
6	U Aung Win Than		10 April 2026	Incumbent	189 days	Tatmadaw	U Min Aung Hlaing

=== Rakhine State ===
No.	Name	Picture	Took office	Left office	Time in office	Political Party	Appointer
1	U Hla Maung Tin		30 March 2011	19 June 2014	3 years, 81 days	Union Solidarity and Development Party	U Thein Sein
2	U Maung Maung Ohn		1 July 2014	25 August 2015	1 year, 55 days	Tatmadaw	U Thein Sein
3	U Nyi Pu		30 March 2016	1 February 2021	4 years, 308 days	National League for Democracy	U Htin Kyaw
4	Dr. Aung Kyaw Min		1 August 2021	1 February 2023	1 year, 184 days	Union Solidarity and Development Party	U Min Aung Hlaing
5	U Htein Lin		1 February 2023	10 April 2026	3 years, 68 days	Independent	U Min Aung Hlaing
6	U Naing Oo		10 April 2026	Incumbent	189 days	Union Solidarity and Development Party	U Min Aung Hlaing

=== Yangon Region ===
No.	Name	Picture	Took office	Left office	Time in office	Political Party	Appointer
1	U Myint Swe		30 March 2011	30 March 2016	5 years, 0 days	Union Solidarity and Development Party	U Thein Sein
2	U Phyo Min Thein		30 March 2016	1 February 2021	4 years, 308 days	National League for Democracy	U Htin Kyaw
3	U Hla Soe		1 August 2021	31 January 2022	183 days	Independent	U Min Aung Hlaing
4	U Soe Thein		1 February 2022	10 April 2026	4 years, 68 days	Independent	U Min Aung Hlaing
5	U Aung Naing Thu		10 April 2026	Incumbent	189 days	Union Solidarity and Development Party	U Min Aung Hlaing

=== Shan State ===
No.	Name	Picture	Took office	Left office	Time in office	Political Party	Appointer
1	U Aung Myat (aka) Sao Aung Myat		30 March 2011	30 March 2016	5 years, 0 days	Union Solidarity and Development Party	U Thein Sein
2	Dr. Lin Htut		30 March 2016	1 February 2021	4 years, 308 days	National League for Democracy	U Htin Kyaw
3	Dr. Kyaw Tun		1 August 2021	1 February 2023	1 year, 184 days	Union Solidarity and Development Party	U Min Aung Hlaing
4	U Aung Zaw Aye		1 February 2023	31 January 2024	364 days	Independent	U Min Aung Hlaing
5	U Aung Aung		31 January 2024	10 April 2026	2 years, 69 days	Union Solidarity and Development Party	U Min Aung Hlaing
6	U Sai Htein Soe		10 April 2026	Incumbent	189 days	Union Solidarity and Development Party	U Min Aung Hlaing

=== Ayeyarwady Region ===
No.	Name	Picture	Took office	Left office	Time in office	Political party	Appointer
1	U Thein Aung		30 March 2011	30 March 2016	5 years, 0 days	Union Solidarity and Development Party	U Thein Sein
2	Mahn Johnny		30 March 2016	9 January 2018	1 year, 285 days	National League for Democracy	U Htin Kyaw
3	U Hla Moe Aung		18 January 2018	1 February 2021	3 years, 14 days	National League for Democracy	U Htin Kyaw
4	U Tin Maung Win		1 August 2021	10 April 2026	4 years, 252 days	Union Solidarity and Development Party	U Min Aung Hlaing
5	U Aye Kyaw		10 April 2026	Incumbent	189 days	Union Solidarity and Development Party	U Min Aung Hlaing
