= State and Region Hluttaws =

Legislatures of subdivisions of Myanmar

Constituency maps for State and Regional Hluttaws

Myanmar (also known as Burma) is divided into fifteen first-level administrative divisions, which include seven states (ပြည်နယ်), seven regions (တိုင်းဒေသကြီး), and one union territory (ပြည်ထောင်စုနယ်မြေ). The regions were called divisions prior to August 2010.

Each State and Region has a State Hluttaw or Region Hluttaw made up of elected civilian members and unelected representatives of the Armed Forces. The Constitution of Myanmar grants the Myanmar Armed Forces' Commander-in-Chief the right to appoint military officials to one-third of parliamentary seats, while the remaining two-third seats are elected. The number of seats in each State or Region Hluttaw depends on the number of townships (each township constituency has 2 MPs), as well as ethnic representatives. The largest Hluttaws are the Shan State and Yangon Region Hluttaws, with 143 and 123 seats, respectively, while the smallest are the Kayah State and Kayin State Hluttaws, which have 20 and 22 seats, respectively.

The current Hlutttaws were elected in the 2025-2026 Myanmar general election and were first convened on 20 March 2026.

"Hluttaw" is a Burmese word that translates to "Assembly" or "Parliament".

== Third State and Regional Hluttaws (2026–31) ==
State/Region Hluttaws	MPs	Military MPs	Ethnic Minister	Total
State Hluttaws
Chin State Hluttaw	18	6	0	24
Kachin State Hluttaw	36	13	4	53
Kayah State Hluttaw	14	5	1	20
Kayin State Hluttaw	14	6	3	23
Mon State Hluttaw	20	8	3	31
Rakhine State Hluttaw	34	12	1	47
Shan State Hluttaw	96	34	7	137
Regional Hluttaws
Ayeyarwady Region Hluttaw	52	18	2	72
Bago Region Hluttaw	56	19	1	76
Magway Region Hluttaw	50	17	1	68
Mandalay Region Hluttaw	56	19	1	76
Sagaing Region Hluttaw	74	25	2	101
Taninthayi Region Hluttaw	20	7	1	28
Yangon Region Hluttaw	90	31	2	123
	630	220	29	879

=== Leaders ===
Name	Party	Constituency	Position
Chin
	USDP		Chief Minister
Kawl Lian Thang	USDP	Paletwa-2	Speaker
Thant Sin Oo	USDP	Matupi-2	Deputy Speaker
Kachin
			Chief Minister
Rawan Jung	USDP	Machanbaw-1	Speaker
Thein Tun Aye	USDP	Mohnyin-2	Deputy Speaker
Kayah
			Chief Minister
Maw Reh	USDP	Loikaw-1	Speaker
Soe Reh	USDP	Bawlakhe-1	Deputy Speaker
Kayin
			Chief Minister
San Ko	USDP	Thandaunggyi-1	Speaker
Aye Min Htwe	USDP	Myawaddy-1	Deputy Speaker
Mon
			Chief Minister
Thet Htwe	USDP	Mawlamyine-2	Speaker
Min Aung Myint	USDP	Ye-2	Deputy Speaker
Rakhine
			Chief Minister
Dr San Shwe	USDP	Sittwe-2	Speaker
Dr Htin Lin Oo	USDP	Myebon-2	Deputy Speaker
Shan
			Chief Minister
Sai Lone Kyaw	USDP	Pekon-2	Speaker
Sai Tun Sein	USDP	Mong Pyin-1	Deputy Speaker
Ayeyarwady
			Chief Minister
Thein Tun	USDP	Kyaunggon-1	Speaker
Saw Thet Naing Oo	USDP	Kangyidaunt-1	Deputy Speaker
Bago
			Chief Minister
Aung Cho Oo	USDP	Pyay-1	Speaker
Kyaw Htay	USDP	Phyu-1	Deputy Speaker
Magwe
			Chief Minister
Dr Maung Maung Htay	USDP	Magwe-1	Speaker
Khin Maung Nyo	USDP	Pakokku-1	Deputy Speaker
Mandalay
			Chief Minister
Aung Kyaw Moe	USDP	Meiktila-1	Speaker
Kyaw Myint	USDP	Yamethin-1	Deputy Speaker
Sagaing
			Chief Minister
Tin Hlaing Myint	USDP	Monywa-1	Speaker
Myo Thant	USDP	Kanbalu-2	Deputy Speaker
Tanintharyi
			Chief Minister
Myat Ko	USDP	Dawei-1	Speaker
Khin Maung Myint	USDP	Yephyu-1	Deputy Speaker
Yangon
			Chief Minister
Htay Aung	USDP	Thaketa-1	Speaker
Kyaw Kyaw Soe	USDP	North Okkalapa-2	Deputy Speaker

== Second State and Regional Hluttaws (2016–21) ==
State/Region Hluttaws	MPs	Military MPs	Ethnic Minister	Total
State Hluttaws
Chin State Hluttaw	18	6	0	24
Kachin State Hluttaw	36	13	4	53
Kayah State Hluttaw	14	5	1	20
Kayin State Hluttaw	14	6	3	23
Mon State Hluttaw	20	8	3	31
Rakhine State Hluttaw	34	12	1	47
Shan State Hluttaw	96	34	7	137
Regional Hluttaws
Ayeyarwady Region Hluttaw	52	18	2	72
Bago Region Hluttaw	56	19	1	76
Magway Region Hluttaw	50	17	1	68
Mandalay Region Hluttaw	56	19	1	76
Sagaing Region Hluttaw	74	25	2	101
Taninthayi Region Hluttaw	20	7	1	28
Yangon Region Hluttaw	90	31	2	123
	630	220	29	879

=== Leaders ===
Name	Party	Constituency	Position
Chin
Salai Lian Luai	NLD	Falam 2	Chief Minister
Zo Bawi	NLD	Hakha 1	Speaker
Aung Than	NLD	Mindat 1	Deputy Speaker
Kachin
Khat Aung	NLD	Myitkyina 1	Chief Minister
Tun Tin	NLD	Bhamo 2	Speaker
Dain Khan Phone	NLD	Putao 2	Deputy Speaker
Kayah
L Phaung Sho	NLD	Mese 2	Chief Minister
Hla Htwe	NLD	Shadaw 2	Speaker
Tin Myint	NLD	Loikaw 2	Deputy Speaker
Karen
Nang Khin Htwe Myint	NLD	Hpa-an 1	Chief Minister
Saw Chit Khin	NLD	Hlaingbwe 2	Speaker
Nang Thuzar Khin	NLD	Kawkareik 1	Deputy Speaker
Mon
Min Min Oo	NLD	Bilin 2	Chief Minister
Tin Ei	NLD	Thanbyu Zayat 1	Speaker
Dr. Aung Naing Oo	AMDP	Chaungzon 1	Deputy Speaker
Rakhine
Nyi Pu	NLD	Gwa 2	Chief Minister
San Kyaw Hla	ANP	Ponnagyun 1	Speaker
Pho Min	ANP	Rathedaung 2	Deputy Speaker
Shan
Lin Htut	NLD	Lashio 1	Chief Minister
Sai Long Hseng	USDP	Kengtung 1	Speaker
Sao Aung Myat	USDP	Ywangan 2	Deputy Speaker
Ayeyarwady
Mahn Johnny	NLD	Kyonpyaw 2	Chief Minister
Aung Kyaw Khaing	NLD	Ingapu 2	Speaker
San Min Aung	NLD	Bogalay 2	Deputy Speaker
Bago
Win Thein	NLD	Yedashe 2	Chief Minister
Khin Maung Yin	NLD	Letpadan 1	Speaker
Kyi Zin	NLD	Kyauktaga 2	Deputy Speaker
Magwe
Aung Moe Nyo	NLD	Pwintbyu 1	Chief Minister
Tar	NLD	Salin 1	Speaker
Zaw Myo Win	NLD	Myothit 2	Deputy Speaker
Mandalay
Zaw Myint Maung	NLD	Amarapura 1	Chief Minister
Aung Kyaw Oo	NLD	Patheingyi 1	Speaker
Khin Maung Htay	NLD	Pyinoolwin 2	Deputy Speaker
Sagaing
Myint Naing	NLD	Shwebo 2	Chief Minister
Than	NLD	Kathar 1	Speaker
Bo Than Nyunt	NLD	Indaw 1	Deputy Speaker
Tanintharyi
Lei Lei Maw	NLD	Thayetchaung 1	Chief Minister
Khin Maung Aye	NLD	Dawei 1	Speaker
Kyi Soe	NLD	Yebyu 2	Deputy Speaker
Yangon
Phyo Min Thein	NLD	Hlegu 2	Chief Minister
Tin Maung Tun	NLD	Dagon 1	Speaker
Lin Naing Myint	NLD	Kamayut 2	Deputy Speaker
Source: The Myanmar Times

== First State and Regional Hluttaws (2011–16) ==
=== Leaders ===
Name	Party	Constituency	Position
Chin
Hong Ngai	USDP	Mindap 2	Chief Minister
Hauk Khim Kham	USDP	Tunzan 2	Speaker
Ohn Lwin	USDP	Matupi 1	Deputy Speaker
Kachin
La John Ngan Hsai	USDP	Tanai 1	Chief Minister
Rawajon	USDP	Machanbaw 1	Speaker
Sai Myint Kyaw	USDP	Phakant 2	Deputy Speaker
Kayah
Khin Maung Oo	USDP	Bawlekhe 1	Chief Minister
Kyaw Swe	USDP	Loikaw 1	Speaker
Maung Maung Aye	USDP	Shadaw 2	Deputy Speaker
Karen
Brig. Gen. Zaw Min	Military		Chief Minister
Saw Aung Kyaw Min	USDP	Kyainseikkyi 1	Speaker
Mahn Hla Myaing	USDP	Kawkereik 1	Deputy Speaker
Mon
Ohn Myint	USDP	Mudon 1	Chief Minister
Kyin Pe	USDP	Chaungson 2	Speaker
Htay Lwin	USDP	Kyaikto 1	Deputy Speaker
Rakhine
Maung Maung Ohn	Military		Chief Minister
Htein Lin	USDP	Gwa 1	Speaker
Thar Nyunt	USDP	Manaung 2	Deputy Speaker
Shan
Sao Aung Myat	USDP	Taunggyi 1	Chief Minister
Sai Lone Sai	USDP	Kentung 1	Speaker
Sai Kham Hmat	USDP	Lashio 2	Deputy Speaker
Irrawaddy
Thein Aung	USDP	Ingapu 1	Chief Minister
San Tint	USDP	Yekyi 1	Speaker
Dr. Htein Win	USDP	Kyaunggon 1	Deputy Speaker
Bago
Nyan Win	USDP	Zigon 1	Chief Minister
Win Tin	USDP	Pegu 1	Speaker
Win Myint Soe	USDP	Gyobingauk 2	Deputy Speaker
Magwe
Phone Maw Shwe	USDP	Minbu 1	Chief Minister
Ye Myint	USDP	Magwe 1	Speaker
Saw Win Maung	USDP	Taungdwingyi 2	Deputy Speaker
Mandalay
Ye Myint	USDP	Myingyan 2	Chief Minister
Win Maung	USDP	Taungtha 2	Speaker
Aung Htay Kyaw	USDP	Pyinoolwin (May Myo) 1	Deputy Speaker
Sagaing
Tha Aye	USDP	Wetlet 1	Chief Minister
Thin Hlaing	USDP	Kantbalu 1	Speaker
Thaung Sein	USDP	Pale 2	Deputy Speaker
Tanintharyi
Myat Ko	USDP	Dawei 2	Chief Minister
Htin Aung Kyaw	USDP	Pulaw 2	Speaker
Nyi Win	USDP	Kawthaung 1	Deputy Speaker
Yangon
Myint Swe	USDP	Shwepyithar 1	Chief Minister
Sein Tin Win	USDP	Kungyankon 2	Speaker
Tin Aung	USDP	Dagon myothit	Deputy Speaker
Source: Mizzima

== See also ==
- Pyidaungsu Hluttaw
- Amyotha Hluttaw
- Pyithu Hluttaw
- Administrative divisions of Burma
