= Ethnic Affairs Minister =

State or regional official in Myanmar

An Ethnic Affairs Minister (Burmese: တိုင်းရင်းသားရေးရာ ဝန်ကြီးများ) is a representative elected by an ethnic minority in a given state or region of Myanmar if that division is composed of an ethnic minority population of 0.1 percent or greater of the total populace [roughly 51,400 people]. If one of the country's ethnic minorities counts their state of residence as its namesake, however, it is not granted an ethnic affairs minister (e.g. there is no Mon ethnic affairs minister in Mon State). Only voters who share an ethnic identity with a given ethnic affairs minister post are allowed to vote for candidates to the position.

== Composition ==
There are currently 29 Ethnic Affairs Ministers elected to the State and Regional Hluttaws, with the number of Ministers per Hluttaw ranging from 1 to 7 sitting at once. Ethnic Affairs Ministers are considered to be a member of their State or Regional legislature, but unlike State MPs represent a geographically dispersed ethnic group, and are accountable only to them for the purposes of re-election. Ethnic Affairs Ministers are elected in all but one of Myanmar's states and regions, with only Chin State electing no Ministers at all.

Ministers are not elected for ethnicities that are a majority of their state/region, or where a state/region already has a self-administered district or self-administered zone dedicated to those ethnic groups. Groups represented by an Ethnic Affairs Minister in a particular state do not need to be a minority elsewhere in the country - the Bamar people have ministers in Shan, Kayin, Kachin, Kayah, and Mon States, despite forming a majority of approximately 68% of the population nationwide. Likewise, some minorities such as the Rakhine may have Ethnic Affairs Ministers in some regions of the country where they are a minority despite also having their own namesake state where they are a majority.

Currently 14 different ethnic groups are eligible to vote for at least one Ethnic Affairs Minister, although they may only do so if they reside within the state for which the minister is elected. Despite meeting the criteria, the Danu, Kokang, Naga, Palaung, and Wa people are ineligible to elect a minister because they enjoy self-determination within a designated Self-Administered Zone or Division.

== Current Ethnic Affairs Ministers ==
The current Ethnic Affairs Ministers were elected in the 2015 General Election, which resulted in a sweeping victory for the National League for Democracy.

Ethnic Affairs Minister elections, 2015
Party	Seats	Net gain/loss	Seats %	Votes %	Votes	+/−
NLD	21	▲21	72.41			
USDP	2	▼9	6.90			
ANP	1	▲1	3.45			
ANDP	1	▲1	3.45			
LHNDP	1	▲1	3.45			
LNDP	1	▲1	3.45			
TLNDP	1	▲1	3.45			
Independent	1	Steady	3.45			
SNLD	0	▼1	0			
Others	0	▼6	0			
Total	29		100	100		

Elected Ethnic Affairs Ministers
Division	Ethnicity	Political Party	Name
Kachin State (4)	Bamar	NLD	Khin Maung Myint (a.k.a. U Dake)
Kachin State (4)	Lisu	NLD	Arrti Yaw Han
Kachin State (4)	Rawang	NLD	Yan Nann Phone
Kachin State (4)	Shan	NLD	Sai Sein Lin
Kayah State (1)	Bamar	USDP	Hla Myo Swe
Kayin State (3)	Bamar	NLD	Nwe Pwe Say
Kayin State (3)	Pa-O	NLD	Lehone Myo Tin
Kayin State (3)	Mon	NLD	Min Tin Win
Mon State (3)	Bamar	NLD	Shwe Myint
Mon State (3)	Kayin	NLD	Aung Myint Khaing
Mon State (3)	Pa-O	NLD	San Wint Khaing
Rakhine State (1)	Chin	NLD	Pone Bwe
Shan State (7)	Akha	ANDP	Tun Hlaing
Shan State (7)	Bamar	USDP	Aung Than Maung
Shan State (7)	Intha	NLD	Are Bay Hla
Shan State (7)	Kachin	Independent	Zote Daung
Shan State (7)	Kayan (aka Padaung)	NLD	Khun Aye Maung
Shan State (7)	Lahu	LHNDP	Yaw That
Shan State (7)	Lisu	LNDP	Igu Sar
Ayeyarwady Region (2)	Kayin	NLD	Gar Moe Myat Myat Thu
Ayeyarwady Region (2)	Rakhine	NLD	Tin Saw
Bago Region (1)	Kayin	NLD	Naw Pwal Say
Magway Region (1)	Chin	NLD	Hla Tun
Mandalay Region (1)	Shan	NLD	Sai Kyaw Zaw
Sagaing Region (2)	Chin	NLD	Lal Htaung Htan
Sagaing Region (2)	Shan	TLNDP	Mwe Mwe Khin
Tanintharyi Region (1)	Kayin	NLD	Saw Lu Ka
Yangon Region (2)	Kayin	NLD	Pan Thinzar Myo
Yangon Region (2)	Rakhine	ANP	Zaw Aye Maung

== See also ==
- Demographics of Myanmar
- Politics of Burma
- State and Region Hluttaws
