= Zaw Myo Tin =

Burmese politician

His Excellency Zaw Myo Tin
- ဇော်မျိုးတင်

Chief Minister of Kayah State
- In office 1 February 2022 – 30 December 2025
- President: Myint Swe (acting); Min Aung Hlaing (acting)
- Prime Minister: Min Aung Hlaing; Nyo Saw
- Preceded by: Khin Maung Oo
- Succeeded by: Sein Oo

Military service
- Allegiance: Myanmar
- Branch/service: Myanmar Army
- Rank: Lieutenant general

Zaw Myo Tin (Burmese: ဇော်မျိုးတင်) is a Burmese politician who served as chief minister of Kayah State. He is a retired Lieutenant general of Tatmadaw, the armed forces of Myanmar. He served as a legislator of Kayah State Hluttaw, minister of Security and Border Affairs of Kayah State, Commander of Regional Operations Commands (Loikaw), Commander of Naypyitaw Regional Command and Chief of Armed Forces Training.

== Career ==
=== Early life ===
He attended to Defence Services Academy as part of the 32nd intake.

=== Military career ===
In 2013, he was appointed as Minister of Security and Border Affairs of Kayah State in Khin Maung Oo's first cabinet. He was reappointed as minister in L Phaung Sho's cabinet. In 2017, he was promoted as Brigadier General and became the commander of Regional Operation Command (Loikaw) under the Eastern Regional Command.

Later, he moved to the Office of the Commander in chief of Defence Services in Naypyitaw with the rank Major General. In January 2021, he was appointed as the Commander of the Naypyitaw Regional Command. In September 2021 he was promoted as Lieutenant General and became the chief of Armed Forces Training.

=== Chief minister ===
In January 2022, the conflict between Tatmadaw and local defence forces in Kayah State forcing residents Loikaw district to flee. On 31 January 2022, the incumbent chief minister Khin Maung Oo was dimissied. Zaw Myo Tin retired from his military post and became the head of Kayah State Government on 1 February 2022. Zaw Myo Tin was ousted on 29 November 2023 when anti-junta forces took control of most of the state during Operation 1111.
