= Boss Ko =

Burmese politician (1974–2021)

His Excellency Boss Ko
- ဘော့စ်ကို

2nd Chief Minister of Kayah State Acting
- In office 3 September 2020 – 1 February 2021
- Appointed by: Win Myint
- Preceded by: L Phaung Sho
- Succeeded by: Khin Maung Oo

Member of the Kayah State Hluttaw
- In office 30 March 2016 – 1 February 2021
- Constituency: Demoso Township Constituency № 2

Minister of Agriculture, Livestock and Irrigation for Kayah State
- In office 7 April 2016 – 1 February 2021
- President: Htin Kyaw; Win Myint

Personal details
- Born: 14 October 1974 Puphar village, Demoso, Kayah State, Myanmar
- Died: 24 December 2021 (aged 47)
- Party: National League for Democracy
- Spouse: Lu Siya
- Occupation: Politician
- Cabinet: Kayah State Government

Boss Ko (14 October 1974 – 24 December 2021) was a Burmese politician who served as acting Chief Minister of Kayah State, Minister of Agriculture, Livestock and Irrigation for Kayah State and Kayah State Parliament MP for Demoso Township Constituency No. 2.

== Early life and education ==
Boss Ko was born on 14 October 1974 in Puphar village, Demoso, Kayah State, Myanm to parents U Thung and Mushi. He finished high school in Loikaw.

== Political career ==
He was a member of the National League for Democracy Party. In the 2015 Myanmar general election, he contested the Demoso Township constituency No. 2 for Kayah State Parliament and won a seat. He was appointed Minister of Agriculture, Livestock and Irrigation for Kayah State on 7 April 2016, and acting Chief Minister on 3 September 2020 by President Win Myint, after chief minister L Phaung Sho was relieved from post. He served until the 1 February 2021 military coup d'état in Myanmar. He was detained by the military council after the coup.

== Later life and death ==
Ko died on 24 December 2021, at the age of 47 after he escaped from prison.
