= Win Nyunt =

Burmese politician

Minister of the Kachin State Government
- Incumbent
- Assumed office 5 April 2016
- Constituency: Waingmaw Township

Personal details
- Born: 1 October 1963 (age 63) Bhamo, Myanmar
- Party: National League for Democracy
- Children: Thinzar Win Nyunt, Phyu Phyu Htay, Minn Kent
- Parent(s): Nyunt Shwe (Father); Hla Myint (mother)
- Education: Yangon Technological University (B.E electronic )

Win Nyunt (Burmese:ဝင်းညွန့်, born 1 October 1963) is a Burmese politician who currently serves as a Minister of ministry of Road Transports and electricity in Kachin State Government and an MP of Kachin State Hluttaw for Waingmaw township from 2015 election. He is a member of the National League for Democracy.

== Early life and education ==
Win Nyunt was born on 1 October 1963 in Bhamo, Kachin State, Myanmar. He Graduated high school from Basic Education High School No. 1 Bhamo. He graduated with a B.E. electronic from Yangon Technological University.

== Political career ==
He is a member of the National League for Democracy. In the 2015 Myanmar general election, he was elected as a Kachin State Hluttaw MP, winning a majority of 6007 votes and elected representative from Waingmaw Township parliamentary constituency. By the order of President of Myanmar (Win Myint) and he become a Minister of Kachin State Government.
