= Tin Maung Win (general) =

Burmese army general

Lieutenant General Tin Maung Win
- တင်မောင်ဝင်း
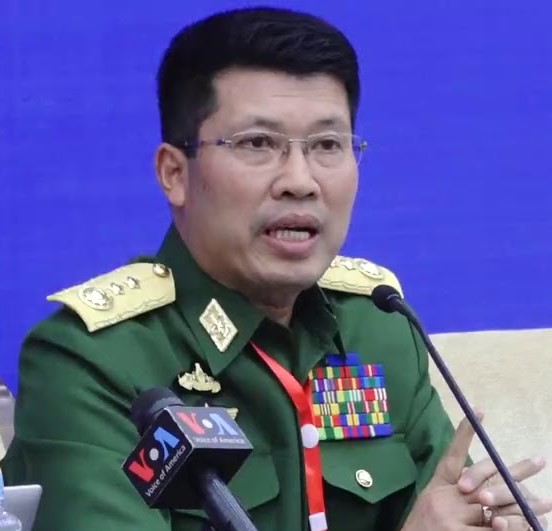
- Tin Maung Win in 2023

Chief Minister of the Ayeyarwady Region Government
- Incumbent
- Assumed office 1 August 2021
- Preceded by: Hla Moe Aung

Personal details
- Spouse: Kyi Kyi Tun

Military service
- Allegiance: Myanmar
- Branch/service: Tatmadaw
- Rank: Lieutenant General

Tin Maung Win (Burmese: တင်မောင်ဝင်း; pronounced [tɪ̀ɴ màʊɴ wɪ́ɴ]) is a retired Burmese army general from the Tatmadaw and is currently serving as the Chief Minister of the Ayeyarwady Region Government. He retired from the army with the rank of lieutenant general.

== Military career ==
He is a graduate of the Tatmadaw (Army) Officers Training School, Bahtoo (OTS) Weekly - 64. He served in the military with the Army Gazette No. 17606. It is the same week as former Home Minister Lieutenant General Soe Htut. In July 2008, he served as the commander of the 22nd Battalion, based in Ba'an, Karen State, with the rank of colonel. In 2009, he was promoted to the rank of brigadier general. In August 2010, the commander of the Southwest Regional Military Command. In 2011, he was assigned as the commander of the Southeast Military Command. After that, in 2016, Lieutenant General Tin Maung Win served as the Chief Air Defense Officer in the Tatmadaw and was among those who were transferred to the Tatmadaw reserve force in 2020. Then, as a member of the joint monitoring committee on the cessation of hostilities at the Union level and after the November election of 2020, he was also responsible as a member of the peace dialogue committee of the military established by the military. In February 2021, he continued to participate as a member of the Tatmadaw's Peace Dialogue Committee.

=== Government positions ===
After the Myanmar military coup in February 2021, he retired from the military in August 2021, and he was appointed as the Chief Minister of Ayeyarwady Region Government.

== Awards received ==
On 17 November 2022, he received the honorific award of Sithu administrator awarded by the State Administration Council.
