= Tanintharyi Region Government =

- တနင်္သာရီတိုင်းဒေသကြီးအစိုးရအဖွဲ့
- Seal of the Government

- Seal of the Government Office

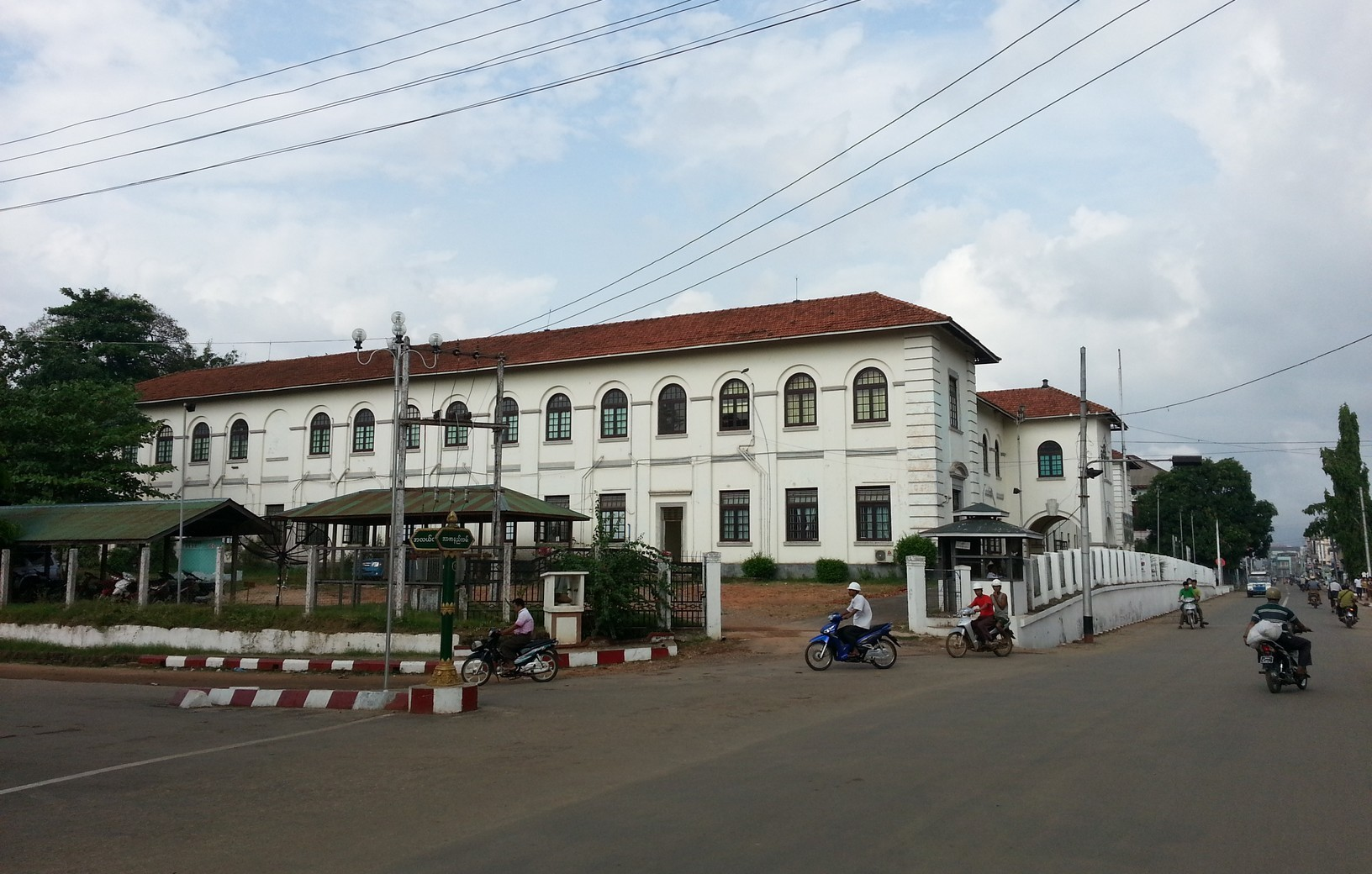
- Office of the Taninthayi Region Government

Agency overview
- Formed: 30 March 2011
- Jurisdiction: Taninthayi Region Hluttaw
- Agency executive: Myint Maung, Chief Minister
- Parent department: Government of Myanmar
- Website: www.tniregion.gov.mm

Tanintharyi Region Government is the cabinet of the Tanintharyi Region of Myanmar. The cabinet is led by chief minister, Myint Maung.The ministers are look like minister without portfolio except minister of municipality affairs.

== Cabinet (2016-present) ==
No	Name	Term of service			Ministry
No	Name	Took office	Left office	Days	Ministry
1	Lae Lae Maw	30 March 2016	11 March 2019	1076	Chief Minister
1	Myint Maung	22 March 2019	Incumbent	2322	Chief Minister (Appointed as acting CM since 11 March 2019)
1	Col Kyaw Zaya	10 March 2019	11 March 2019	1	CM (Acting)
2	Col Zaw Lwin	5 April 2016	17 February 2017	318	Ministry of Security and Border Affairs
2	Col Kyaw Zaya	17 February 2017	Incumbent	3085	Ministry of Security and Border Affairs
3	Phyoe Win Tun	5 April 2016	19 March 2019	1078	Ministry of Planning and Finance
3	Ye Ye Cho	26 March 2019	Incumbent	2318	Ministry of Planning and Finance
4	Ho Pin	5 April 2016	Incumbent	3403	Ministry of Social Affairs and Municipal Affairs
5	Myint Maung	5 April 2016	22 March 2019	1081	Ministry of Natural Resource and Environment
5	Hla Htwe	26 March 2019	Incumbent	2318	Ministry of Natural Resource and Environment
6	Kyi Hlaing	5 April 2016	19 March 2019	1078	Ministry of Electricity and Energy
6	Aung Thura	26 March 2019	Incumbent	2318	Ministry of Electricity and Energy
7	Myint San	5 April 2016	Incumbent	3403	Ministry of Agriculture, Livestock and Irrigation
8	Saw Lu Kar	30 March 2016	Incumbent	3409	Ministry of Kayin Ethnic Affairs
9	Soe Myint	11 May 2016	Incumbent	3367	Region Advocate
10	Thein Tun	11 May 2016	Incumbent	3367	Region Auditor
