= Kyaw Swar Win =

Burmese politician

Member of the Sagaing Region Hluttaw
- Incumbent
- Assumed office 3 February 2016
- Constituency: Katha Township № 1

Member of the Pyithu Hluttaw
- Incumbent
- Assumed office 5 January 2021
- Constituency: Katha Township

Personal details
- Born: 7 February 1984 (age 42) Katha, Myanmar
- Party: National League for Democracy

Kyaw Swar Win (Burmese: ေက်ာ္စြာဝင္း) is a Burmese politician who currently serves as a Pyithu Hluttaw MP for the Katha Township Constituency.

== Political career ==
In the 2015 Myanmar general election, he was elected as a Sagaing Region Hluttaw MP and elected representative for the Katha Township No. 1 parliamentary constituency.

In the 2020 Myanmar general election, he was elected as a Pyithu Hluttaw MP and elected representative for the Katha Township parliamentary constituency.
