= Hla Moe Aung =

His Excellency Hla Moe Aung
- လှမိုးအောင်

2nd Chief Minister of Ayeyarwady Region
- In office 18 January 2018 – 1 February 2021
- President: Htin Kyaw
- Preceded by: Mahn Johnny
- Succeeded by: Tin Maung Win

Member of the Ayeyarwady Region Hluttaw
- Incumbent
- Assumed office 8 February 2016
- Constituency: Myanaung Township Constituency № 1
- Majority: 37,124 (62.17%)

Personal details
- Born: December 22, 1965 (age 60)
- Party: National League for Democracy
- Spouse: Khin Hinin Nyo
- Education: Yezin Agricultural University
- Cabinet: Ayeyarwady Region Government

Hla Moe Aung (born 22 December 1965) is a Burmese politician who served as Chief Minister of Ayeyarwady Region and Ayeyarwady Region Parliament MP for Myanaung Township Constituency No. 1. He was appointed as Chief Minister on January 18, 2018, after the resignation of the former chief minister Mahn Johnny. Hla Moe Aung is the vice-chair of the Township National League for Democracy. In 2021, following the 2021 Myanmar coup d'état, Hla Moe Aung was placed under house arrest. The State Administration Council appointed Tin Maung Win as the new Chief Minister.

== Early life and education ==
Hla Moe Aung was born on 22 December 1965 to parents Kyi Win and Htwe Yi. He attended Yezin Agricultural University in 1983 and received his B.Ag in 1991.

== Political career ==
During the 1988 Uprising, he served as the chairman of the Thapyegone District Students' Union and joined the National League for Democracy in 1989. In the 2012 by-elections, he was the chairman of the NLD Thapyegone's Election Campaign.

In the 2015 Myanmar general election, he contested the Myanaung Township constituency No. 1 for Yangon Region Parliament and won a seat by 37,124 votes. He also served as a secretary of the agriculture and livestock committee for the regional parliament. On 18 January 2018, he became chief minister, after the resignation of the former chief minister Mahn Johnny.

During the aftermath of the 2021 Myanmar coup d'état, Hla Moe Aung was one of many NLD MPs, ministers and speakers arrested. He was placed under house arrest in his Pathein home by the military junta. On 30 December 2022, he was released from house arrest and escorted back to Myanaung Township.
