= Zaw Hein =

Burmese army officer

- ဇော်ဟိန်း

Commander of the Yangon Command
- Incumbent
- Assumed office April 2023
- Leader: Min Aung Hlaing

Commander of the Naypyidaw Command
- In office 25 August 2021 – March 2023
- Leader: Min Aung Hlaing
- Succeeded by: Wai Lin

Commandant of the Defence Services Academy
- In office 25 July 2020 – 28 August 2021
- Preceded by: Htin Latt Oo
- Succeeded by: Zaw Min Latt

Personal details
- Born: c. 1974–1975 Burma (now Myanmar)
- Parent: Thein Aung (father)
- Education: Defence Services Academy

Military service
- Allegiance: Myanmar
- Branch/service: Myanmar Army
- Rank: Major General

Major General Zaw Hein (Burmese: ဇော်ဟိန်း, born c. 1974–1975) (BC - 28089), is a Burmese military officer and current commander of the Yangon Command.

== Military career ==
Zaw Hein graduated from the 38th batch of the Defence Services Academy. He was appointed commander of the Naypyidaw Command on 25 August 2021. In March 2022, he was sanctioned by the American government for committing military atrocities and abuses in the aftermath of the 2021 Myanmar coup d'état.

In April 2023, he was reshuffled to lead the Yangon Command. He was succeeded by Wai Lin as the Commander of the Naypyidaw Command.

== Personal life ==
Zaw Hein's father, Thein Aung, is a former brigadier general who was chief minister of Ayeyarwady Region from 2011 to 2016.

== See also ==
- 2021 Myanmar coup d'état
- State Administration Council
- Tatmadaw
