= San Htwe =

Burmese politician

- စန်းထွေး

Deputy Speaker Ayeyarwady Region Hluttaw
- Incumbent
- Assumed office March 2019
- Preceded by: San Min Aung

Ayeyarwady Region Hluttaw
- Incumbent
- Assumed office 3 February 2016
- Constituency: Danubyu Township
- Majority: 62%

Personal details
- Born: 1957 (age 68–69) Burma
- Party: National League for Democracy
- Occupation: Politician and lawyer

San Htwe (Burmese: စန်းထွေး) is a Burmese politician who currently serves as deputy speaker of Ayeyarwady Region Hluttaw and Ayeyarwady Region MP for Danubyu Township No. 2.

== Early life and education ==
San Htwe was born in 1957 in Danubyu, Myanmar. His previous job was as a lawyer. He had served as the chairman of NLD Danubyu Township.

== Political career ==
He is a member of the National League for Democracy. In the 2015 Myanmar general election, he was elected as an Ayeyarwady Region Hluttaw MP, winning a majority of 62% votes and being elected as a representative from the Danubyu Township No.2 parliamentary constituency. He also served as secretary of the Legislative Committee and a member of the Public Complaints Committee.
