= Akha National Development Party =

Akha National Development Party အာခါအမျိုးသားဖွံ့ဖြိုးတိုးတက်ရေးပါတီ
- Chairman: U Tun Aung
- Founded: 22 April 2015
- Headquarters: Tachileik Township, Shan State, Myanmar
- Ideology: Akha interests
- Seats in the Amyotha Hluttaw: 0 / 224
- Seats in the Pyithu Hluttaw: 0 / 440
- Seats in the State and Regional Hluttaws: 0 / 880
- Ethnic Affairs Ministers: 1 / 29

Party flag

The Akha National Development Party (Burmese: အာခါအမျိုးသားဖွံ့ဖြိုးတိုးတက်ရေးပါတီ; ANDP) is a minor political party in Myanmar. The party seeks to represent the Akha people of Shan State. As of the 2015 general election, it currently controls a single ethnic affairs ministry.
