= Kayin State Government =

State government in Myanmar

- ကညီကီၢ်စဲၣ်ပဒိၣ်
- Flag of Kayin State

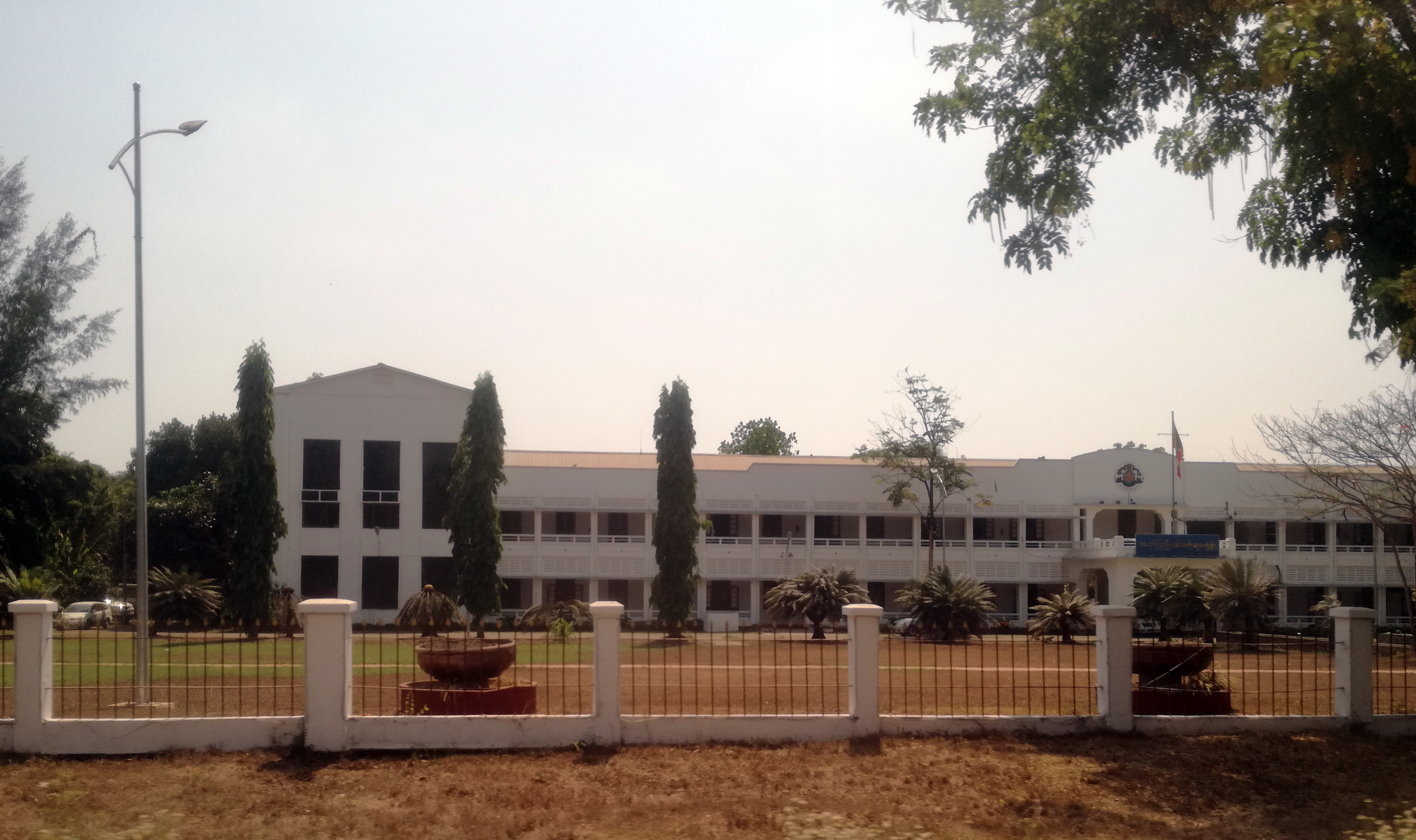
- Office of the Kayin State Government

Government overview
- Formed: 30 March 2011
- Jurisdiction: Kayin State Hluttaw
- Headquarters: Hpa-An, Kayin State
- Government executive: Nang Khin Htwe Myint, Chief Minister
- Parent department: Government of Myanmar

Kayin State Government (S'gaw Karen: ကညီကီၢ်စဲၣ်ပဒိၣ်) is the cabinet of Kayin State. The cabinet is led by chief minister, Nang Khin Htwe Myint.

== Cabinet (April 2016–present) ==
Name	Portfolio
Nang Khin Htwe Myint	Chief Minister
Aung Lwin, Col.	Minister of Security and Border Affairs
Than Naing	Minister of Planning, Finance and Municipal Affairs
Saw Myint Oo	Minister of Agriculture, Livestock and Irrigation
Soe Hlaing	Minister of Electricity and Industry
Saw Pyi Thar	Minister of Environment, Forestry, Mines, Road and Communication
Tin Win Kyaw, Dr.	Minister of Social Affairs
Tayza Htut Hlaing Htwe	Minister of Bamar Ethnic Affairs
Min Tin Win	Minister of Mon Ethnic Affairs
Khun Myo Tint	Minister of Pa-O Ethnic Affairs
Saw Chit Myint Lay	State Advocate General
Saw Hla Tun	State Auditor General

== See also ==
State and Region Government of Myanmar
