= Ye Myint Swe =

Burmese politician

- ရဲမြင့်ဆွေ
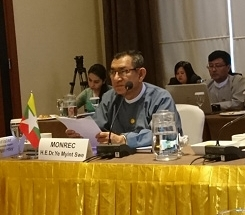

Member of the Amyotha Hluttaw
- Incumbent
- Assumed office 5 January 2021

Member of the Taninthayi Region Hluttaw
- Incumbent
- Assumed office 1 February 2016
- Constituency: Taninthayi Region №.2

Personal details
- Born: 2 June 1981 (age 44) Myeik, Tanintharyi Region, Myanmar
- Party: National League for Democracy
- Cabinet: Sagaing Region Government
- Nickname: Phoe Thar

Ye Myint Swe (Burmese: ရဲမြင့်ဆွေ) is a Burmese politician who currently serves as a Amyotha Hluttaw MP for Tanintharyi Region.

== Political career ==
He is a member of the National League for Democracy. In the 2015 Myanmar general election, he was elected as a Tanintharyi Region Hluttaw MP, and elected representative from Taninthayi Region No.2 parliamentary constituency. At the 2020 Myanmar general election, he was elected as an Amyotha Hluttaw MP and elected representative from Taninthayi Region parliamentary constituency.
