= Lahu National Development Party =

Lahu National Development Party လားဟူ အမျိုးသား ဖွံ့ဖြိုးတိုးတက်ရေး ပါတီ
- Abbreviation: LNDP
- Chairperson: Daw Aye Thi Tar
- Secretary-General: Thet Win
- Vice chairman: Yaw Thet
- Founded: 1990
- Headquarters: No 34, Lane 4, Parami Road, Ward 1, Lashio Township, Shan State, Myanmar
- Membership: 8,000
- Ideology: Lahu interests
- Seats in the Amyotha Hluttaw: 0 / 224
- Seats in the Pyithu Hluttaw: 0 / 440
- Seats in the Shan State Hluttaw: 1 / 151
- Ethnic Affairs Ministers: 1 / 29

Party flag

The Lahu National Development Party (Burmese: လားဟူအမျိုးသားဖွံ့ဖြိုးတိုးတက်ရေးပါတီ; abbreviated LNDP), sometimes spelled La Hu National Development Party (LHNDP), is a minor political party in Myanmar.

The party contested the 1990 general election, and one candidate, Deinel Aung, won a seat in the Pyithu Hluttaw, representing Mongping Township, Shan State. However, his victory was not recognized by the military, which seized power shortly after the elections.

The party was registered again on 29 April 2010 to contest the 2010 general election. The party won 3 seats in the 2015 general election. After the 2021 coup, the LNDP did not re-register, taking an anti-coup stance. This stance was reportedly highly supported, and led to the LNDP overtaking the Lahu Democratic Union (LDU) as the primary Lahu party.
