= Census in Myanmar =

Historical population
Year	Pop.	±%
1872	2,747,148	—
1881	3,737,000	+36.0%
1891	7,722,000	+106.6%
1901	10,491,000	+35.9%
1911	12,115,000	+15.5%
1921	13,212,000	+9.1%
1931	14,667,000	+11.0%
1941	16,824,000	+14.7%
1973	28,921,000	+71.9%
1983	35,306,000	+22.1%
2014	51,419,420	+45.6%
2024	51,316,756	−0.2%
Sources: 1872-1983, 2014 2024

The Burmese census is an official count of the human population in Burma (Myanmar).

== History ==
The earliest census on record in Burmese history was taken in 1359 in the Pinya Kingdom. The first nationwide census was taken in 1638, and it was followed by two other nationwide censuses in 1784 and 1803.

=== British colonial era ===
The first modern census was taken in 1872 in the British colonial period, as part of the Census in British India. It was carried out in 10-year intervals until 1941.

=== Post-independence era ===
In the post-independence area, the census has been conducted 3 times, in 1973, 1983, and 2014. A census was taken in 1953, but it only included urban towns and two rural areas in Chin and Kachin states. Series A, Union of Burma 1953 Census of Population, Union Urban 252 Towns.

=== 2014 Census ===
The last census was conducted by the Ministry of Immigration and Population's Department of Population, and was funded by Western donors, at a cost of US$74 million, and supervised by the United Nations Population Fund.

=== 2024 Census ===
In March 2023, the SAC announced it would conduct a nationwide census between 1 and 15 October 2024, in preparation for the next Myanmar general election. Due to ongoing political instability in the wake of the 2021 Myanmar coup d'état and limited recognition of the military junta, the UN denied allegations that it would support the planned census.

In September 2024, the military leader of Myanmar Min Aung Hlaing announced that the main purpose of the 2024 census is to get voter lists for the 2025 general election. The current main opposition to Min Aung Hlaing, the National Unity Government advised caution when answering the questions on the census. The 2024 census does not include the data from regions controlled by ethnic armed forces and pro-democracy guerrillas. The preliminary census result showed the population to be 51.3 million, a decrease from 51.5 million in 2014.
