= Kachin State Democracy Party =

Kachin State Democracy Party ကချင်ပြည်နယ်ဒီမိုကရေစီပါတီ
- Abbreviation: KSDP
- Chairman: Manam Tu Ja
- Founded: 2013
- Dissolved: 7 June 2019
- Merged into: Kachin State People's Party
- Headquarters: No 386, Yuzana Ward, Myitkyina, Kachin State, Myanmar
- Ideology: Kachin interests democracy
- Colours: Green
- Seats in the Amyotha Hluttaw: 0 / 224
- Seats in the Pyithu Hluttaw: 0 / 440
- Seats in the Kachin State Hluttaw: 0 / 53

Party flag
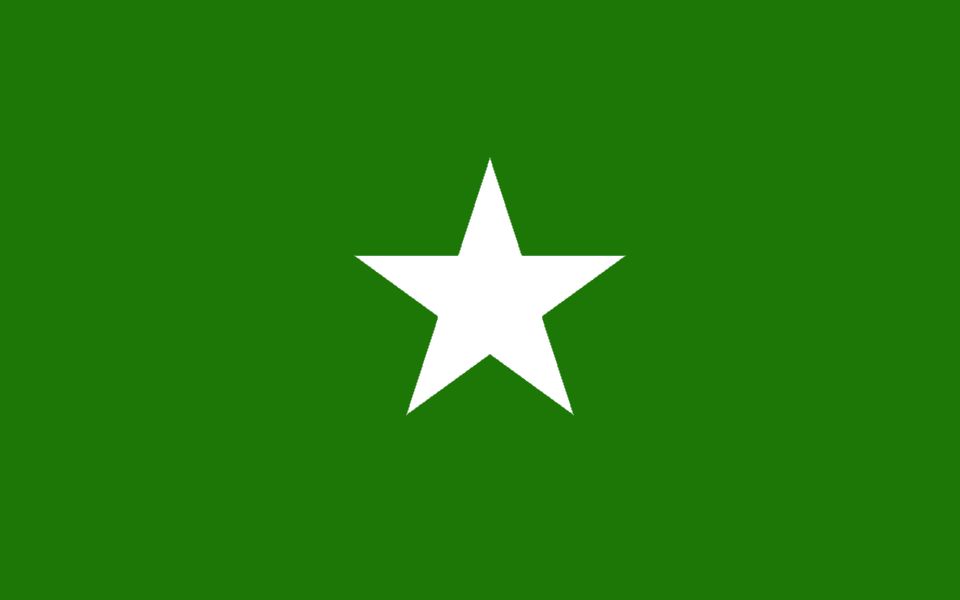

The Kachin State Democracy Party (Burmese: ကချင်ပြည်နယ်ဒီမိုကရေစီပါတီ; abbreviated KSDP) was a minor political party in Myanmar (Burma). It was founded in 2013 by the former Vice President of the Kachin Independence Organisation (KIO), Dr. Manam Tu Ja, who led the official KIO delegation that participated in the military sponsored National Convention; which resulted in the drafting of the 2008 constitution.

The party's original request to participate in the 2010 general election was denied by the electoral commission, due to D. Manam Tu Ja's ties to the KIO. One of the campaign goals of the KSDP was to amend parts of the 2008 constitution.

== Dissolved ==
KSDP merged with Unity and Democracy Party of Kachin State and Kachin Democratic Party to form Kachin State People's Party on 7 June 2019.
