= Thein Aung =

Burmese politician

- သိန်းအောင်

1st Chief Minister of Ayeyarwady Region
- In office March 30, 2011 – March 30, 2016
- Appointed by: President of Myanmar
- President: Thein Sein
- Preceded by: Office Established
- Succeeded by: Mahn Johnny

Representative of Ayeyarwady Region Hluttaw
- In office 2011 – March 30, 2016
- Preceded by: Office established
- Constituency: Ingapu Township No. 1
- Majority: Uncontested

Minister for Forestry

Personal details
- Born: Burma
- Party: Union Solidarity and Development Party
- Spouse: Khin Htay Myint
- Cabinet: Ayeyarwady Region Government

Military service
- Branch/service: Myanmar Army
- Rank: Brigadier General

Thein Aung (Burmese: သိန်းအောင်) is a Myanmar politician who served as the Chief Minister of Ayeyarwady Region, from 2011 to 2016. He is a former brigadier-general in the Myanmar Army and was a member of the ruling military junta, the State Peace and Development Council. He is also a former Minister for Forestry.

A member of the Union Solidarity and Development Party, he won an uncontested seat to represent Ingapu Township Constituency No. 1 as an Ayeyarwady Region Hluttaw representative in the 2010 Burmese general election.

== Personal life ==
Thein Aung's son Zaw Hein is a major-general in the Burmese armed forces and the incumbent commander of the Naypyidaw Command.
