= Kyaw Zaya =

Burmese Military Officer

Colonel Kyaw Zaya
- ကျော်ဇေယျ

Minister of Security and Border Affairs and Council Member for Tanintharyi Region
- In office 20 February 2017 – 1 February 2021; 1 August 2021
- President: Htin Kyaw; Myint Swe (acting); Win Myint
- Preceded by: Zaw Lwin

Chief Minister of Tanintharyi Region Acting
- In office 10 March 2019 – 11 March 2019
- Preceded by: Lei Lei Maw
- Succeeded by: Myint Maung (Acting)

Personal details
- Born: Dawei, Burma
- Occupation: Military officer, Minister
- Cabinet: Tanintharyi Region Government

Military service
- Allegiance: Myanmar
- Branch/service: Myanmar Army
- Rank: Colonel

Colonel Kyaw Zaya (Burmese: ကျော်ဇေယျ; also spelt Kyaw Zay Ya) is a Burmese military officer currently serving as Minister of Security and Border Affairs for Tanintharyi Region since 20 February 2017. He previously served as Acting Chief Minister of Tanintharyi Region after the arrested Chief Minister Lei Lei Maw with corruption case on 10 March 2019. He became a member of Tanintharyi Administration Council formed after 2021 coup and resumed military services on 1 August 2021.

== Military and governmental career ==
Kyaw Zaya served as the tactical officer at Khamaukgyi Subtownship-based Operations (20) Administration Department after the appointed him as vice principal and the chief coach at the No. (12) military training school. Later, he was appointed as Minister of Security and Border Affairs for Tanintharyi Region which is member of Tanintharyi Region Government on 20 February 2017.

=== Acting Chief Minister ===
On 10 March 2019, following the arrested Chief Minister Lei Lei Maw with corruption case, Kyaw Zaya was appointed as acting Chief Minister of Tanintharyi Region, according to constitution laws.

On 11 March 2019, he succeed his position to Myint Maung, a Regional Minister of Natural Resources and Environment, as acting Chief Minister.
