= Kachin State Government =

State government overview
- Formed: 30 March 2010
- Jurisdiction: Kachin State Hluttaw
- Headquarters: Myitkyina, Kachin State
- State government executive: Khat Aung, Chief Minister
- Parent department: Government of Myanmar
- Website: www.kachinstate.gov.mm

Kachin State Government is the cabinet of Kachin State. The cabinet is led by chief minister, Khat Aung.

== Cabinet (April 2016–present) ==
Cabinet of the Kachin State Government
Khet Aung, Dr.	Chief Minister
Kyaw Lin Aung, Col.	Minister of Security and Border Affairs
Wai Lin	Minister of Finance, Tax, Planning and Economy
Win Nyunt	Minister of Road, Communication, Electricity and Industry
Mya Thein	Minister of Agriculture, Livestock and Irrigation
H La Aung	Minister of Natural Resources and Environment
Nay Win	Minister of Municipal Affairs
Thin Lwin, Dr.	Minister of Social Affairs
Khin Maung Myint (or) Date	Minister of Bamar Ethnic Affairs
Sai Sin Lin	Minister of Shan Ethnic Affairs
ArrT Yaw Han	Minister of Lisu Ethnic Affairs
Yan Nann Phone	Minister of Rawang Ethnic Affairs
Din Sin Yan	State Advocate
Tin Hlaing	State Auditor
