= Chin State Government =

Cabinet of Chin State, Myanmar

- ချင်းပြည်နယ် အစိုးရအဖွဲ့
- Flag of Chin State

Government overview
- Formed: 30 March 2011
- Jurisdiction: Chin State Hluttaw
- Headquarters: Hakha, Chin State
- Government executive: Dr Vung Suan Thang, Chief Minister
- Parent department: Government of Myanmar
- Website: chinstate.gov.mm

Chin State Government is the cabinet of Chin State, Myanmar. The cabinet is led by chief minister Dr Vung Suan Thang.

== Government of Chin State (2026–present) ==
President Min Aung Hlaing formed the cabinet of Chin State Government on 10 April 2026.

| No. | Name | Portfolio |
|---|---|---|
| 1 | Dr Vung Suan Thang | Chief Minister |
| 2 | BC 30184 Colonel Khin Maung Htwe | Minister for Security and Border Affairs |
| 3 | Dr Lian Za Khup | Minister for Planning, Economy and Finance |
| 4 | Sein Tun Hla | Minister for Social Affairs |
| 5 | Nay Lin Aung | Minister for Electricity, Energy, Industry and Transport |
| 6 | Pau Za Lian | Minister for Agriculture, Livestock and Irrigation |
| 7 | Win Zaw Oo | Minister for Natural Resources and Environmental Conservation |
| 8 | Aung Kyaw Htay | Minister for Municipal Affairs |
| 9 | Kap Tluang | State Advocate |
| 10 | Maung Maung Khin | State Auditor |
| 11 | Zaw Win Htay | State Secretary |

== Fifth Government of Chin State (2025–2026) ==
| No. | Name | Portfolio |
|---|---|---|
| (1) | Dr Vung Suan Thang | Chief Minister |
| (2) | BC 30184 Colonel Khin Maung Htwe | Minister of Security and Border Affairs |
| (3) | Win Zaw Oo | Minister of Social Affairs |
| (4) | Nay Lin Aung | Minister of Transport |
| (5) | Sein Tun Hla | Minister of Ethnic Affairs |
| (6) | Suan Dok Cing | State Advocate |
| (7) | Zaw Win Htay | State Secretary |
| (8) | Lian Za Khup | Minister for Economic Affairs |
| (9) | Kawl Lian Thang | Minister for Natural Resources |

== Cabinet (April 2016–2021) ==
| No. | Name | Portfolio |
|---|---|---|
| (1) | Salai Lian Luai | Chief Minister |
| (2) | Kyaw Kyaw, Colonel | Minister of Security and Border Affairs |
| (3) | Wi Kaw | Minister of Planning and Finance |
| (4) | Mang Hen Dal | Minister of Agriculture, Livestock, Forestry and Mines |
| (5) | Shwe Htee Ooe | Minister of Road and Transportation |
| (6) | Soe Htet | Minister of Municipal Affairs, Electricity and Industry |
| (7) | Pau Lun Min Thang | Minister of Social Affairs |
| (8) | Htan Kyone (or) Sani Zar Hoe | State Advocate |
| (9) | Larr Tin Man (or) David Lar Tin Maung | State Auditor |
