= Myat Ko =

H.E U Myat Ko
- မြတ်ကို

5th Chief Minister of Tanintharyi Region
- Incumbent
- Assumed office 1 August 2021
- Appointed by: Min Aung Hlaing
- Preceded by: Myint Maung

2nd Chief Minister of Tanintharyi Region
- In office January 27, 2012 – March 30, 2016
- Appointed by: President of Myanmar
- President: Thein Sein
- Preceded by: Khin Zaw
- Succeeded by: Lae Lae Maw

Taninthayi Region Minister of Finance
- In office 2011 – March 30, 2016
- Preceded by: Office established

Representative of Taninthayi Region Hluttaw
- In office 2011 – March 30, 2016
- Preceded by: Office established
- Constituency: Dawei Township No. 2

Personal details
- Born: Burma
- Party: Union Solidarity and Development Party
- Cabinet: Tanintharyi Region Government

Myat Ko (Burmese: မြတ်ကို) is the Chief Minister of Tanintharyi Region, Myanmar. He also served as Chief Minister of the region from 2012 to 2016.

A member of the Union Solidarity and Development Party, he was elected to represent Dawei Township Constituency No. 2 as a Taninthayi Region Hluttaw representative in the 2010 Burmese general election. Previously serving as the region's Minister of Finance, he was appointed by President Thein Sein to Chief Minister on 27 January 2012. He replaced Khin Zaw, who had resigned as Chief Minister on 6 January 2012, citing health problems.
