= Soe Moe Thu =

Burmese politician (born 1984)

Dr Soe Moe Thu
- စိုးမိုးသူ
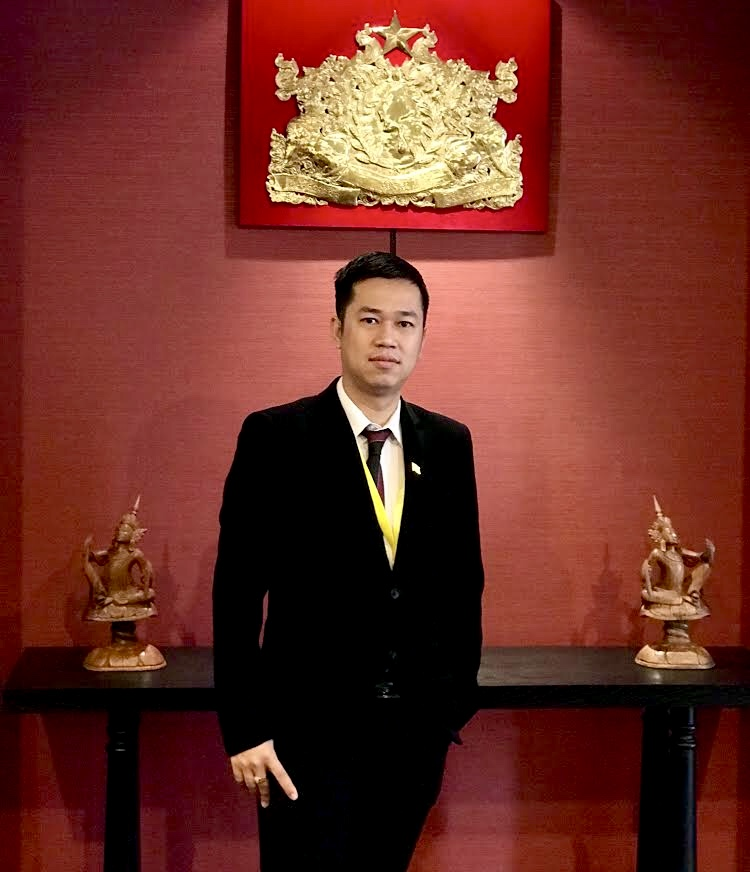
- Soe Moe Thu in 2019

Member of the House of Representatives
- Incumbent
- Assumed office 1 February 2016
- Preceded by: Mahn Johnny
- Constituency: Myaungmya
- Majority: 80,158 (50.09%)

Personal details
- Born: 7 August 1984 (age 42) Myaungmya, Myanmar
- Party: National League for Democracy
- Spouse: Phyu Phyu Thaw (m. 2012; div. 2016)
- Parent(s): Soe Hlaing (father); Khin Than Oo (mother)
- Education: University of Medicine, Magway (M.B.B.S)
- Occupation: Politician, Medical doctor

Soe Moe Thu (Burmese: စိုးမိုးသူ; born 7 August 1984) is a Burmese politician and medical doctor who currently serves as a member of parliament in the House of Representatives for Myaungmya Township constituency. He is the former head of Youth-wing of the National League for Democracy.

== Early life and career ==
Soe Moe Thu was born on 7 August 1984 in Myaungmya, Ayeyarwady Region, Myanmar to Burmese-Chinese parents. He is the eldest son of three siblings, having two younger sisters.

He graduated high school from Basic Education High School No. 1 Myaungmya. He enrolled at the University of Medicine, Magway and graduated with a degree in MBBS in 2010. He gained a scholarship from Clinton Foundation and educated in INTI International University. In 2014, he graduated with Ageing and social pension from Economic Policy Research Institute, Chiang Mai.

In 2011, he founded Fuji drinking water, a water purification company in Myaungmya. He is also a medical doctor and founded clinics in Myaungmya to offer free health care.

== Political career ==
In February 2014, he joined the National League for Democracy. Later, he served as the head of NLD's youth wing from July 2014 to November 2016. Since that time, he became a member of the NLD's central committee and also a member of the party's central campaign.

In the 2015 Myanmar general election, he contested the Myaungmya Township constituency winning a majority of 80,158 (50.09% of the votes), won a House of Representatives seat. On 19 August 2018, he was appointed as a member of International Relation Committee of House of Representatives.
