= Than (politician) =

Burmese politician

- သန်းး

Speaker of Sagaing Region Hluttaw
- Incumbent
- Assumed office 8 February 2016

Member of the Sagaing Region Hluttaw
- Incumbent
- Assumed office 3 February 2016
- Constituency: Katha Township №.1

Personal details
- Born: Katha, Sagaing, Myanmar
- Party: National League for Democracy
- Education: Yangon University

Than (Burmese: သန်း) is a Burmese politician who currently serves as incumbent Speaker of Sagaing Region Hluttaw and Sagaing Region Parliament MP for Katha Township No.1.

== Political careers ==
In the 2015 Myanmar general election, he contested the Sagaing Region Hluttaw from Katha Township No. 1 parliamentary constituency. He was assumed as Sagaing Region Parliament MP on 3 February 2016.

Than also serving as speaker of Sagaing Region Hluttaw.
