= Myint Maung (politician) =

Burmese politician

His Excellency Dr Myint Maung

3rd Chief Minister of Tanintharyi Region
- Incumbent
- Assumed office 11 March 2019
- Appointed by: President of Myanmar
- President: Htin Kyaw; Win Myint
- Preceded by: Kyaw Zaya (Acting)

Member of the Taninthayi Region Hluttaw
- Incumbent
- Assumed office 8 February 2016
- Constituency: Kawthaung Township Constituency № 2

Minister of Natural Resource and Environment for Taninthayi Region
- In office 5 April 2016 – 22 March 2019
- Preceded by: Hla Htwe

Personal details
- Born: Kawthaung Township, Taninthayi Division, Myanmar
- Party: National League for Democracy
- Occupation: Politician,
- Cabinet: Tanintharyi Region Government

Myint Maung is a Burmese politician who currently serves as Chief Minister of Taninthayi Region and Taninthayi Region Parliament MP for Kawthaung Township Constituency No. 2.

He previously served as the Minister of Natural Resource and Environment for Taninthayi Region from 2016 to 2019. Myint Maung is also the NLD secretary for Tanintharyi Region. He was appointed as acting Chief Minister for Tanintharyi Region on 11 March 2019 after former chief minister Lei Lei Maw was arrested on charges of corruption. On 10 February 2021, in the aftermath of the 2021 Myanmar coup d'état, Myint Maung was arrested and detained during a late-night raid of his residence.
