= Khin Maung Oo =

Burmese politician

Chief Minister of Kayah State
- In office 1 August 2021 – 31 January 2022
- President: Myint Swe (acting)
- Prime Minister: Min Aung Hlaing
- Preceded by: Himself (KSAC Chairman)
- Succeeded by: Zaw Myo Tin
- In office 30 March 2011 – 30 March 2016
- President: Thein Sein
- Preceded by: Office Established
- Succeeded by: L Phaung Sho

Chairman of Kayah State Administration Council
- In office 2 February 2021 – 1 August 2021
- Preceded by: Office Established
- Succeeded by: Himself (Chief Minister)

Member of Kayah State Hluttaw
- In office 2011 – 30 March 2016
- Preceded by: Office Established
- Constituency: Bawlakhe Township (1)

Personal details
- Born: Myanmar
- Party: Kayah Democratic Party (since 2017)
- Other political affiliations: Union Solidarity and Development Party (2010 - 2015)

Khin Maung Oo (Burmese: ခင်မောင်ဦး; also known as Bu Reh) was the Chief Minister of Kayah State, Myanmar. He served as Chief Minister of Kayah State from 2011 to 2016 and August 2021 to January 2022 under Thein Sein and PM Min Aung Hlaing. He was appointed as the Chairman of Kayah State Administration Council, sub-council of State Administered Council, from February 2021 to 1 August 2021.

A member of the Union Solidarity and Development Party (USDP), he was elected to represent Bawlakhe Township Constituency No. 1 as a Kayah State Hluttaw representative in the 2010 Burmese general election.

On 28 June 2015, he resigned from the USDP, along with the Kayah State ministers for transportation, electric power, industry, and Bamar ethnic affairs. On 13 July 2015, the USDP released a statement that Khin Maung Oo had in fact been sacked for "disturbing party unity" and violating the party's policy for the 2015 Burmese general election. The conflict was related to disagreements with the national headquarters of USDP regarding the permission for 2 government ministers, Aung Min and Soe Thein, to contest 'safe seats' in Kayah State for the elections. The seats they had contested in the 2010 Burmese general election were now occupied by members of the National League for Democracy and were considered more challenging to win.

Khin Maung Oo's father, Kyaw Din, was a former chairman of the Karenni State People's Council during the socialist era.
