= Lisu National Development Party =

Lisu National Development Party လီဆူးအမျိုးသားဖွံ့ဖြိုးရေးပါတီ
- Abbreviation: LNDP
- Chairman: U Arki Dawu
- Founded: 17 December 2013 (12 years ago)
- Headquarters: Myitkyina, Kachin State, Myanmar
- Paramilitary wing: Wuyang People's Militia
- Ideology: Lisu interests
- Colours: Red
- Seats in the Amyotha Hluttaw: 0 / 224
- Seats in the Pyithu Hluttaw: 0 / 440
- Seats in the Shan State Hluttaw: 2 / 151
- Ethnic Affairs Ministers: 1 / 29

Party flag

The Lisu National Development Party (LNDP) is a political party in Myanmar seeking to represent the interests of the Lisu people. In the 2015 general election, the party won a two seats in both the Pyithu Hluttaw (House of Representatives) and the Shan State Hluttaw; furthermore, it has one Ethnic Affair Minister, according official results.

During the Myanmar Civil War, party leaders formed the pro-Tatmadaw "Wuyang People's Militia" to fight the Kachin Independence Army and the People's Defense Forces. This militia, led by U Shwe Min, splintered from the New Democratic Army - Kachin in 2013. Both the youth and the elderly were conscripted into this "people's militia." U Shwe Min led this militia until his death on March 7, 2024.

== Election results ==
=== House of Nationalities (Amyotha Hluttaw) ===
Election	Leader	Total seats won	Total votes	Share of votes	+/-	Status
2015	U Arki Dawu	0 / 224	9,177	0.04%	New	Extra-parliamentary
2020	U Arki Dawu	0 / 224	23,797	0.09%	0	Not recognised
2025–26	U Arki Dawu	0 / 224	9,336	0.07%	0	Extra-parliamentary

=== House of Representatives (Pyithu Hluttaw) ===
Election	Leader	Total seats won	Total votes	Share of votes	+/-	Status
2015	U Arki Dawu	2 / 440	24,096	0.11%	New	Opposition
2020	U Arki Dawu	0 / 440	24,617	0.09%	▼2	Not recognised
2025–26	U Arki Dawu	0 / 440	6,786	0.05%	0	Extra-parliamentary
