= Mahn Johnny =

Burmese politician

- မန်းဂျော်နီ

2nd Chief Minister of Ayeyarwady Region
- In office 30 March 2016 – 9 January 2018
- Appointed by: President of Myanmar
- President: Htin Kyaw
- Preceded by: Thein Aung
- Succeeded by: Hla Moe Aung

Member of the Ayeyarwady Region Hluttaw
- Incumbent
- Assumed office 8 February 2016
- Constituency: Kyonpyaw Township № 2

Member of the Pyithu Hluttaw
- In office 2 May 2012 – 29 January 2016
- Preceded by: Tint Hsan
- Succeeded by: Soe Moe Thu
- Constituency: Myaungmya Township

Member-elect of the Pyithu Hluttaw
- Preceded by: Constituency established
- Succeeded by: Constituency abolished
- Constituency: Kyonpyaw № 1
- Majority: 31,731 (73%)

Personal details
- Born: 31 January 1942 (age 84) Singaungyi, Bassein, British Burma
- Party: National League for Democracy
- Relations: Kyaw Oo (father); Chat (mother)
- Education: Bassein Regional College; Rangoon Institute of Education
- Occupation: Politician
- Cabinet: Ayeyarwady Region Government

Mahn Johnny (Burmese: မန်းဂျော်နီ) is a Burmese politician, political prisoner and the former Chief Minister for Ayeyarwady Region. He is currently serving as a member of the Ayeyarwady Region Hluttaw for Kyonpyaw Township Constituency No. 2.

== Early life and education ==
Johnny matriculated from high school in 1960 and studied at the Bassein Regional College. From 1965 to 1986, he worked as a primary and secondary school teacher. In 1980, he received a diploma in education from the Rangoon Institute of Education. Johnny is an ethnic Karen and a Catholic.

== Political career ==
In the 1990 Burmese general election, he was elected as an Pyithu Hluttaw MP, winning a majority of 31,731 votes (73% of the votes), but was never allowed to assume his seat.

In the 2012 Myanmar by-elections, he won a seat in the Pyithu Hluttaw, representing Myaungmya Township.

In the 2015 Myanmar general election, Johnny won a seat in the Ayeyarwady Region Hluttaw, representing Kyonpyaw Township.

Johnny resigned from his position as Chief Minister of Ayeyarwady Region on 9 January 2018, citing health reasons. He was succeeded by Hla Moe Aung.

== 2021 Anti-Coup Resistance ==
In late August, photos of Mahn Johny wearing army fatigues and a large loaded rifle were published and spread on Facebook. The military junta was raided the following day, allegedly seizing property. In an interview with Myanmar Now, Johnny stated that he would continue fighting against the injustice of the coup. Johnny's house would later be sealed and his sons and daughters-in-law ordered to leave the premises.
