= Hla Htwe =

U Hla Htwe
- လှထွေး

Speaker of the Kayah State Hluttaw
- Incumbent
- Assumed office 8 February 2016
- Preceded by: Kyaw Swe

Member of the Kayah State Hluttaw
- Constituency: Shadaw Township

Personal details
- Born: 29 March 1954 (age 72) Mong Hsat, Shan State
- Party: National League for Democracy
- Parent: Thet Htun
- Education: B.A. (History)

Hla Htwe is the speaker of the Kayah State Hluttaw. He was elected as an MP from Shadaw Township constituency No. 2 in Kayah State in 2015 and became speaker on 8 February 2016.
