= Khet Aung =

Burmese politician

His Excellency Khat Aung
- ခက်အောင်

Chief Minister of Kachin State
- In office 30 March 2016 – 1 February 2021
- President: Htin Kyaw
- Preceded by: La John Ngan Hsai
- Succeeded by: Khet Htain Nan

Personal details
- Born: March 11, 1946 (age 80) Muse, British Burma (now Muse, Myanmar)
- Cabinet: Kachin State Government

Khet Aung (Burmese: ခက်အောင်; born 1946) is a Burmese politician. He has served as Chief Minister of Kachin State, the head of the Kachin State Government, from March 2016 to February 2021. An ethnic Kachin, he worked as a dentist before entering politics.

== Political career ==
Khet Aung was not a member of any political party prior to the 2015 Myanmar general election, but became an NLD member in 2015. He ran for Kachin State Hluttaw in the November 2015 election, winning a seat in Myitkyina.

In the wake of the 2021 Myanmar coup d'état on 1 February, Khet Aung was detained by the Myanmar Armed Forces.

== Personal life ==
Salai is an ethnic Kachin and practicing Baptist. He has two sons and two daughters. Khet Aung's brother, Khet Htein Nan, is a well-known Kachin politician and former upper house MP. Khet Htein Nan is a member of the rival Union Solidarity and Development Party and lost in the 2015 election.
