= Bago Region Hluttaw =

Bago Region Hluttaw ပဲခူးတိုင်းဒေသကြီးလွှတ်တော်
- 2nd Bago Region Hluttaw

Type
- Type: Unicameral

History
- Founded: 8 February 2016

Leadership
- Speaker: Khin Maung Yin, NLD since 8 February 2016
- Deputy Speaker: Kyi Zin, NLD since 8 February 2016

Structure
- Seats: 76; 57 elected MPs; 19 military appointees
- Political groups: National League for Democracy (55)* Union Solidarity and Development Party (2) Military (19)

Elections
- Last election: 8 November 2015

Meeting place
- Region Hluttaw Meeting Hall; Bago, Bago Region

Footnotes
- Includes one 'Ethnic Minister (Kayin)' from the NLD.

Bago Region Hluttaw (Burmese: ပဲခူးတိုင်းဒေသကြီးလွှတ်တော်; lit. 'Bago Region Assembly') is the legislature of Myanmar's Bago Region. It is a unicameral body, consisting of 76 members, including 57 elected members and 19 military representatives. As of February 2016, the Hluttaw was led by speaker Khin Maung Yin of the National League for Democracy (NLD).

As of the 2015 general election, the NLD won the most contested seats in the legislature, based on the most recent election results.

== General Election results (Nov. 2015) ==
Party	Seats	+/–
National League for Democracy (NLD)	55	▲54
Union Solidarity and Development Party (USDP)	2	▼50
National Unity Party (NUP)	0	▼3
Kayin People's Party (KPP)	0	▼1
Military appointed	19	
Total	76	

== See also ==
- State and Region Hluttaws
- Pyidaungsu Hluttaw
