= Lei Lei Maw =

Burmese politician (born 1965)

Her Excellency Dr Lei Lei Maw
- လဲ့လဲ့မော်
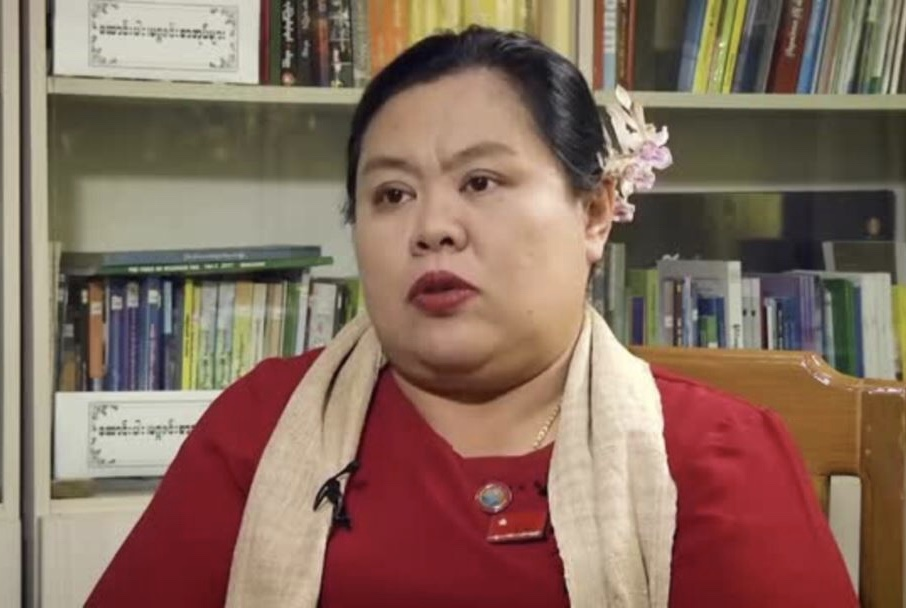

3rd Chief Minister of Tanintharyi Region
- In office 30 March 2016 – 11 March 2019
- Appointed by: President of Myanmar
- President: Htin Kyaw; Win Myint
- Preceded by: Myat Ko
- Succeeded by: Kyaw Zaya (Acting)

Member of the Taninthayi Region Hluttaw
- In office 8 February 2016 – 22 May 2020
- Constituency: Thayetchaung Township № 1

Personal details
- Born: 1965 (age 60–61) Thayetchaung, Taninthayi Division, Burma
- Party: National League for Democracy
- Spouse: Tun Min
- Children: 4
- Occupation: Politician, Medical doctor
- Cabinet: Tanintharyi Region Government

Lei Lei Maw (Burmese: လဲ့လဲ့မော်; also spelt Lae Lae Maw; born 1965) is a Burmese politician and a medical doctor who served as Chief Minister of Tanintharyi Region and Taninthayi Region Parliament MP for Thayetchaung Township Constituency No. 1. She was removed from her chief minister position for corruption on 11 March 2019. She is one of only two women chief ministers appointed by President Htin Kyaw. People called her Jayalalitha of Myanmar.

Lei Lei Maw is the first chief minister to be charged with corruption since the NLD government, led by Aung San Suu Kyi, took power in 2016.

== Early life ==
Lei Lei Maw was born in 1965 in Thayetchaung, Taninthayi Division, Burma. She is an ethnic Karen-Bamar, and practicing Christian. She worked as a medical doctor for 25 years and has delivered free health care in remote villages.

== Political career ==
Lei Lei Maw joined the NLD party in 2012, quickly becoming a member of the central executive committee of NLD. After taking office as an MP for Thayetchaung Township, she said she would work to develop the region and solve land disputes.

After taking the office, she has launched a review of oil palm plantations and tried to ensure the sustainable development of tourism in the Myeik Archipelago.

== Arrested under section 55 of the Anti-Corruption Law ==
On 10 March 2019, Lei Lei Maw was charged with corruption along with three local company officials of Global Grand Services after an investigation by the Anti-Corruption Commission of Myanmar.

According to the investigation report, Lei Lei Maw abused her authority as chief minister in granting several projects to a construction company for clearing bushes in Dawei University campus in November 2016, and in the Dawei Airport on 15 December 2016. It stated that she allowed a budget of 400 million kyats ($263,000) without inviting tender and approving in the regional cabinet.

The commission also found that she asked a director from the regional Department of Highway to build a wall around two plots of land in Dawei owned by her husband but didn’t pay the cost in October 2018. The investigators also discovered that Lei Lei Maw sold her two-story house to a local company at a much higher price in exchange for granting the company permission for several construction projects.

She was sentenced to a total of 30 years in prison on 22 May 2020.
