= Aye Zan =

Burmese politician

His Excellency Dr Aye Zan
- အေးဇံ

Chief minister of Mon State
- In office 1 March 2017 – 1 February 2021
- President: Htin Kyaw
- Preceded by: Min Min Oo
- Succeeded by: Zaw Lin Htun

Mon State Hluttaw MP
- Incumbent
- Assumed office 8 February 2018
- Constituency: Kyaikto Township № 2
- Majority: 21,112 (60.63%)

Member-elect of the Pyithu Hluttaw
- Preceded by: Constituency established
- Succeeded by: Constituency abolished
- Constituency: Kyaikto Township № 2
- Majority: 15,978 (72%)

Personal details
- Born: 4 April 1954 (age 72) Mudon, Mon State
- Party: National League for Democracy
- Education: M.B., B.S
- Alma mater: University of Medicine 2, Yangon
- Cabinet: Mon State Government

Aye Zan (Burmese: အေးဇံ; born 4 April 1954) is a Burmese politician. He served as chief minister for Mon State from 1 March 2017 to the military coup d'état on 1 February 2021.

== Early life and education ==
Aye Zan is an ethnic Mon and he was born on 4 April 1954 in Mudon, Mon State. He graduated from University of Medicine 2, Yangon with medical degree in 1979.

== Political career ==
Aye Zan is a member of National League for Democracy's central executive committee. He is also chairman of Kyaikto Township' National League for Democracy party (NLD). He led Kyaikto Township's NLD party since 1988.

He won a seat in the 1990 election, but was never allowed to assume his seat. In 2015 Myanmar general election, he was elected as a Mon State Hluttaw MP for Kyaikto Township No.2 constituency.

=== Chief minister ===
After former chief minister Min Min Oo resigned from his post, Aye Zan was appointed as a chief minister of Mon State by president Htin Kyaw on 1 March 2017.

In the wake of the 2021 Myanmar coup d'état on 1 February, Aye Zan was detained by the Myanmar Armed Forces.
