= La John Ngan Hsai =

Kachin businessman

- လဂျွန်ငန်ဆိုင်း

Chief Minister of Kachin State
- In office March 2011 – 30 March 2016
- Preceded by: Office Established
- Succeeded by: Khat Aung

Representative of Kachin State Hluttaw
- In office 2011 – 30 March 2016
- Preceded by: Office established
- Constituency: Tanai Township No. 1

Personal details
- Born: Burma
- Party: Union Solidarity and Development Party

La John Ngan Hsai (Burmese: လဂျွန်ငန်ဆိုင်း; also spelt Lajawn Ngan Seng) served as the Chief Minister of Kachin State, Myanmar from 2011 to 2016. He is an ethnic Kachin businessman.

A member of the Union Solidarity and Development Party, he was elected to represent Tanai Township Constituency No. 1 as a Kachin State Hluttaw representative in the 2010 Burmese general election.
