= Aung Naing Thu =

Burmese politician

Police Major General (Retd.) Aung Naing Thu
- အောင်နိုင်သူ
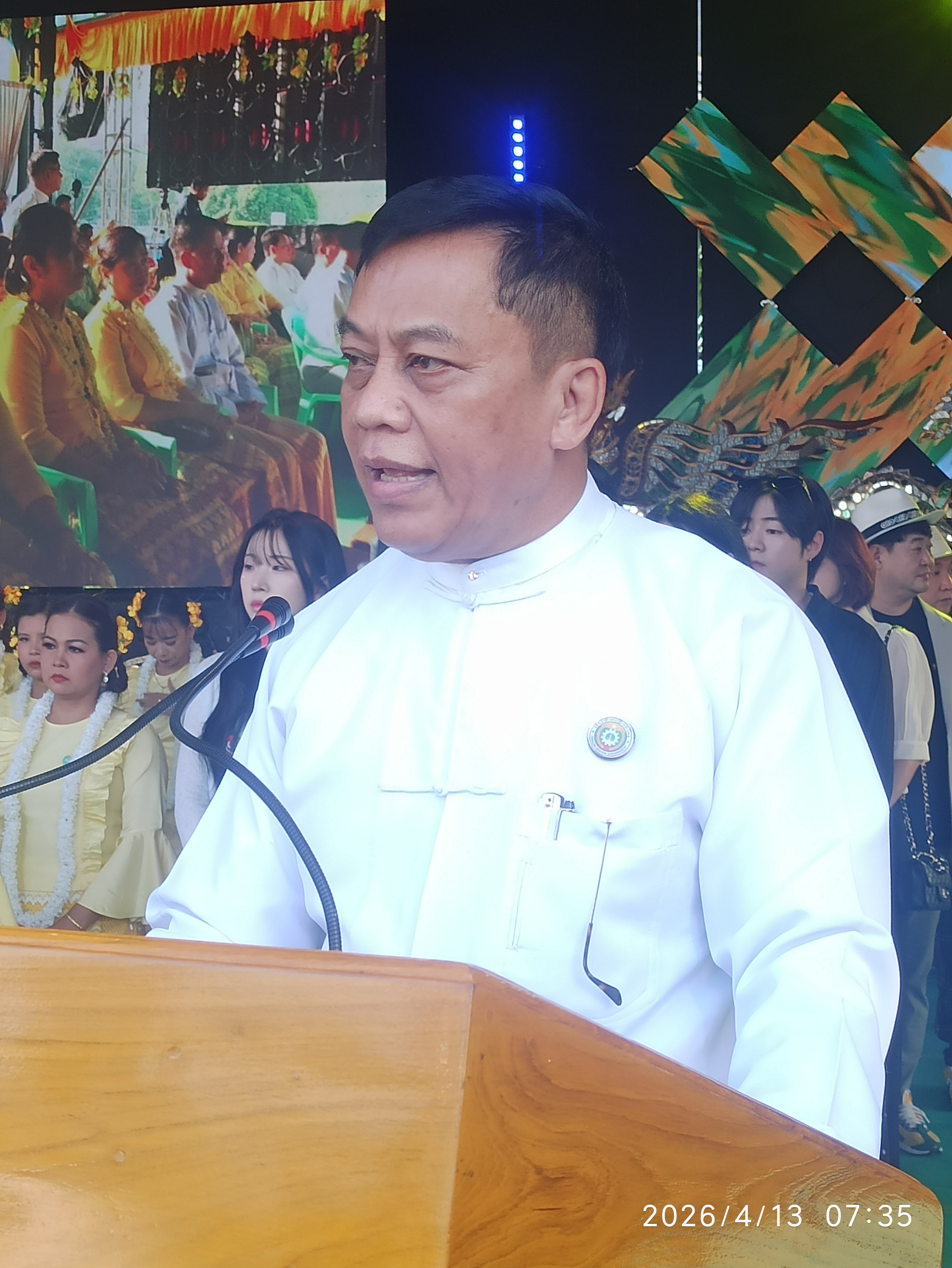
- Aung Naing Thu, Chief Minister of Yangon Region (April 2026)

Chief Minister of Yangon Region
- Incumbent
- Assumed office 10 April 2026
- Appointed by: Min Aung Hlaing
- President: Min Aung Hlaing
- Preceded by: Soe Thein

Member of the Yangon Region Hluttaw
- Incumbent
- Assumed office April 2026
- Preceded by: Tin Win (USDP)
- Constituency: Coco Islands Township No. 1

Personal details
- Born: Aung Naing Thu; December 24, 1963 (age 62) Mandalay, Myanmar
- Party: Union Solidarity and Development Party
- Spouse: Hnin Hnin Aye
- Children: 4
- Parent(s): Than Tin Aung (father); Tin Nwel Yee (mother)
- Education: Mandalay University
- Occupation: Politician
- Profession: Police Officer (Retired)
- Awards: Ye Thurein Medal; Management Excellence Medal (1st Class); Management Excellence Medal (3rd Class)

Aung Naing Thu (အောင်နိုင်သူ ; born 24 December 1963) is a Burmese politician and retired police officer currently serving as the Chief Minister of Yangon Region . A member of the Union Solidarity and Development Party (USDP), he was elected as a representative for Coco Islands Township No. 1 in the Yangon Region Hluttaw following the 2025–2026 general election.

== Early life and education ==
Aung Naing Thu was born on 24 December 1963 in Mandalay, Myanmar. He graduated from Mandalay University with a Master of Arts degree in Geography.

== Police career ==
Aung Naing Thu served in the Myanmar Police Force, reaching the rank of Police Major General. He served as the Deputy Chief of Police (2). In September 2025, he was retired from the police force to enter politics as a candidate for the Union Solidarity and Development Party.

== Political career ==
In the 2025–2026 general election, he joined the Union Solidarity and Development Party and contested the Coco Islands Township seat for the Yangon Region Hluttaw, replacing the former representative Tin Win.

=== Election results ===
He won the constituency with 1,445 votes, accounting for 94.82% of the total votes cast. The Coco Islands constituency, which houses a naval base and a significant number of military-affiliated voters, has been noted for its controlled voting process.

=== Chief Minister of Yangon Region ===
On 6 April 2026, during the third session of the Yangon Region Hluttaw, Aung Naing Thu was proposed as the candidate for the region's Chief Minister. He formally assumed office on 10 April 2026. Following his appointment, he has been involved in overseeing the administrative and electoral processes in Yangon Region.

== Personal life ==
He is married to Hnin Hnin Aye and has four children.
