= L Phaung Sho =

Burmese politician

H.E U L Paung Sho
- အယ်လ်ဖောင်းရှို
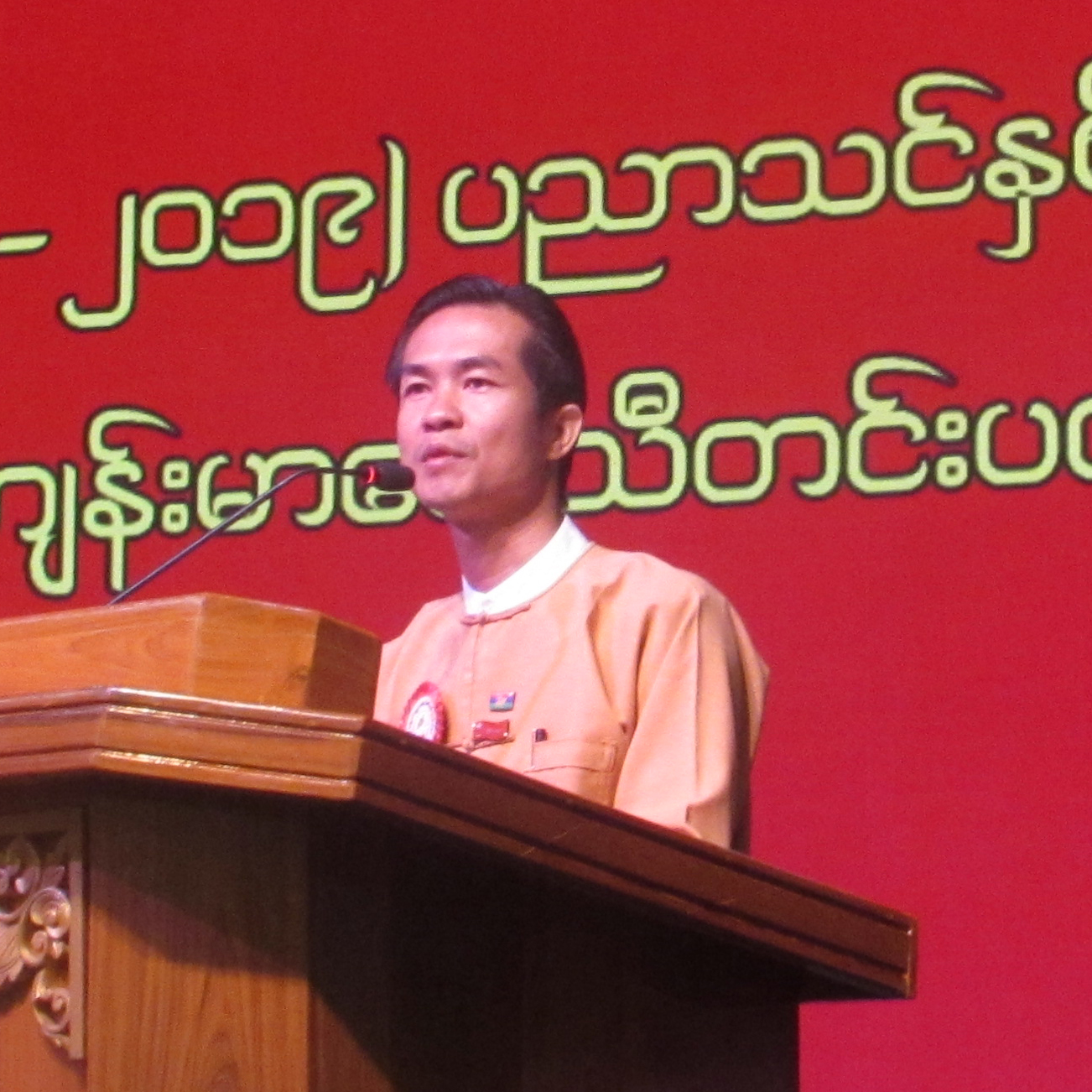
- L Phaung Sho at School Health Week Event at Loikaw (2018)

2nd Chief Minister of Kayah State
- In office 30 March 2016 – 3 September 2020
- Appointed by: President of Myanmar
- President: Htin Kyaw
- Preceded by: Khin Maung Oo
- Succeeded by: Boss Ko (Acting)

Member of the Kayah State Hluttaw
- Incumbent
- Assumed office 8 February 2016
- Constituency: Mese Township Constituency № 2

Personal details
- Born: 5 February 1979 (age 47) Loikaw, Kayah State
- Party: National League for Democracy
- Parent: Ann Thri Sho
- Education: University for Development of the National Races of the Union, Education (B.Ed)
- Cabinet: Kayah State Government

L Paung Sho (Burmese: အယ်ဖောင်းရှို; also spelt L Phaung Sho) is a Burmese politician and former educational staffer who currently serves as MP in the Kayah State Parliament for Mese Township constituency No. 2. He previously served as Chief Minister of Kayah State, as the head of Kayah State Government.

== Early life and education ==
L Paung Sho was born on 5 February 1979 in Lawpita Shan Village. He received B.Ed from the University for Development of the National Races of the Union.

== Political career ==
He joined the National League for Democracy after resigning from his post as deputy officer at a township education department in Mese. In the 2015 Myanmar general election, he contested the Mese Township constituency No. 2 for Kayah State Parliament and won a seat. He was appointed as Chief Minister of Kayah State on 30 March 2016.

L Phaung Sho was removed from his position as chief minister of Kayah State, two days after the state's parliament voted to impeach him for misappropriating state funds. He was accused of misusing state funds, and for renting out state machinery and land designated by the legislature as public space.
