= Salai Lian Luai =

Burmese politician

His Excellency Salai Lian Luai
- ဆလိုင်းလျန်လွယ်

2nd Chief Minister of Chin State
- In office March 30, 2016 – 1 February 2021
- Appointed by: President of Myanmar
- President: Win Myint
- Preceded by: Hong Ngai

Personal details
- Born: Airibual village Falam Township; Chin State
- Party: National League for Democracy
- Children: Four
- Education: Yangon University
- Cabinet: Chin State Government

Salai Lian Luai (Burmese: ဆလိုင်းလျန်လွယ်) is a lawyer-turned-politician who served as Chief Minister of Chin State, the head of Chin State Government.

He received a law degree from Yangon University and served as a lawyer for various government offices in Yangon, Mandalay and Sagaing regions, as well as in Chin State. In his last role as a civil servant, he worked as a Tamu District legal officer.

== Political career ==
In the 2015 election, he contested and won the No 2 spot for Falam Township in the State Hluttaw as a new member of the National League for Democracy.

In the wake of the 2021 Myanmar coup d'état on 1 February, he was detained by the Myanmar Armed Forces. Now he is in India

== Personal life ==
Lian Luai is an ethnic Chin and practicing Baptist. Luai took shelter in Mizoram following the military coup in Myanmar.
