= Kayah State Government =

- ကယားပြည်နယ်အစိုးရအဖွဲ့
- Flag of Kayah State

Government overview
- Formed: 30 March 2010
- Headquarters: Loikaw, Kayah State; 19.675416°N 97.202306°E
- Government executive: Chief Minister
- Parent department: Government of Myanmar
- Website: www.kayahstate.gov.mm

Kayah State Government is the cabinet of Kayah State. The cabinet is led by a chief minister. The Government Office is on the Kanthayawaddi Road.

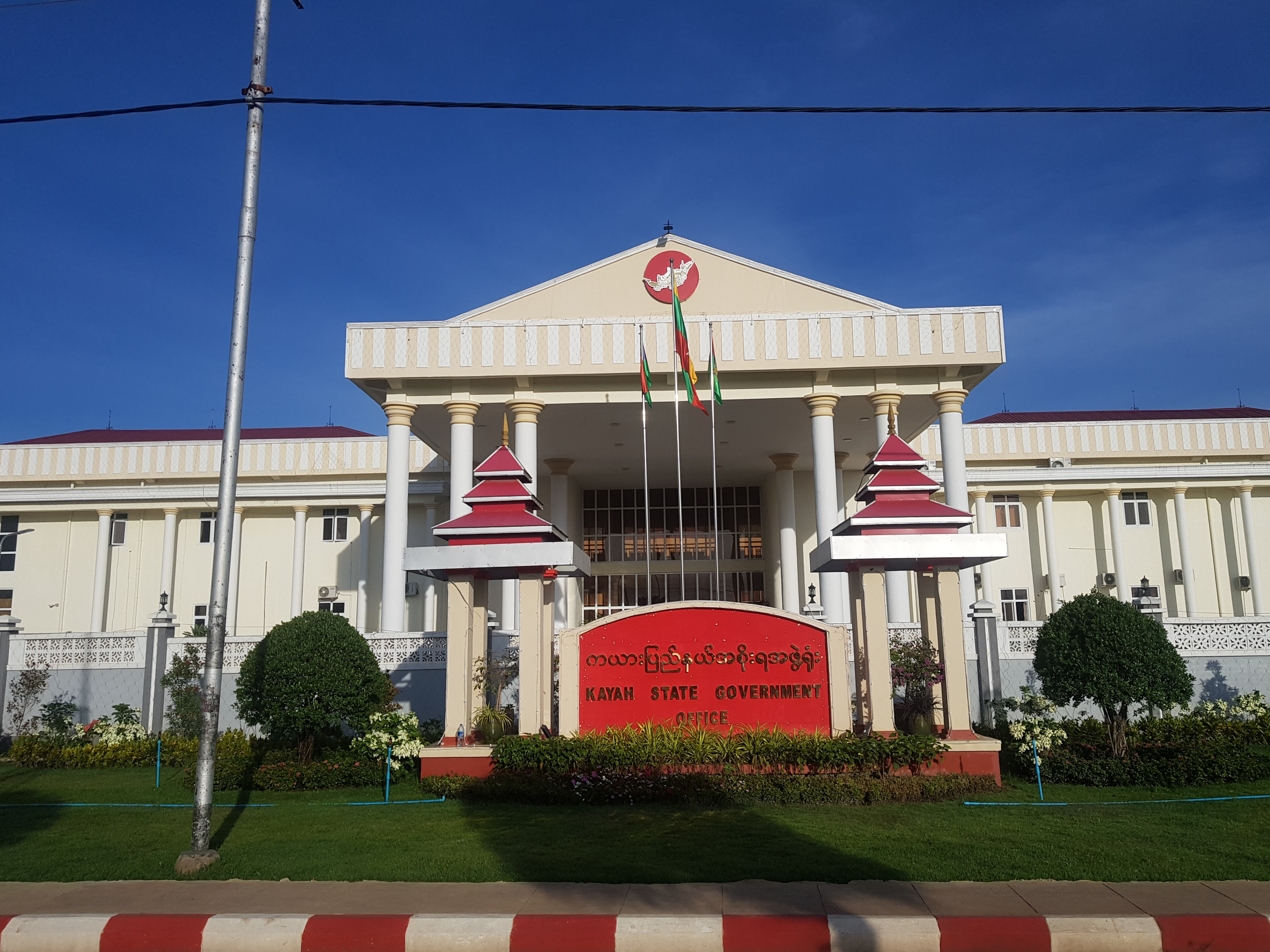
Government Office

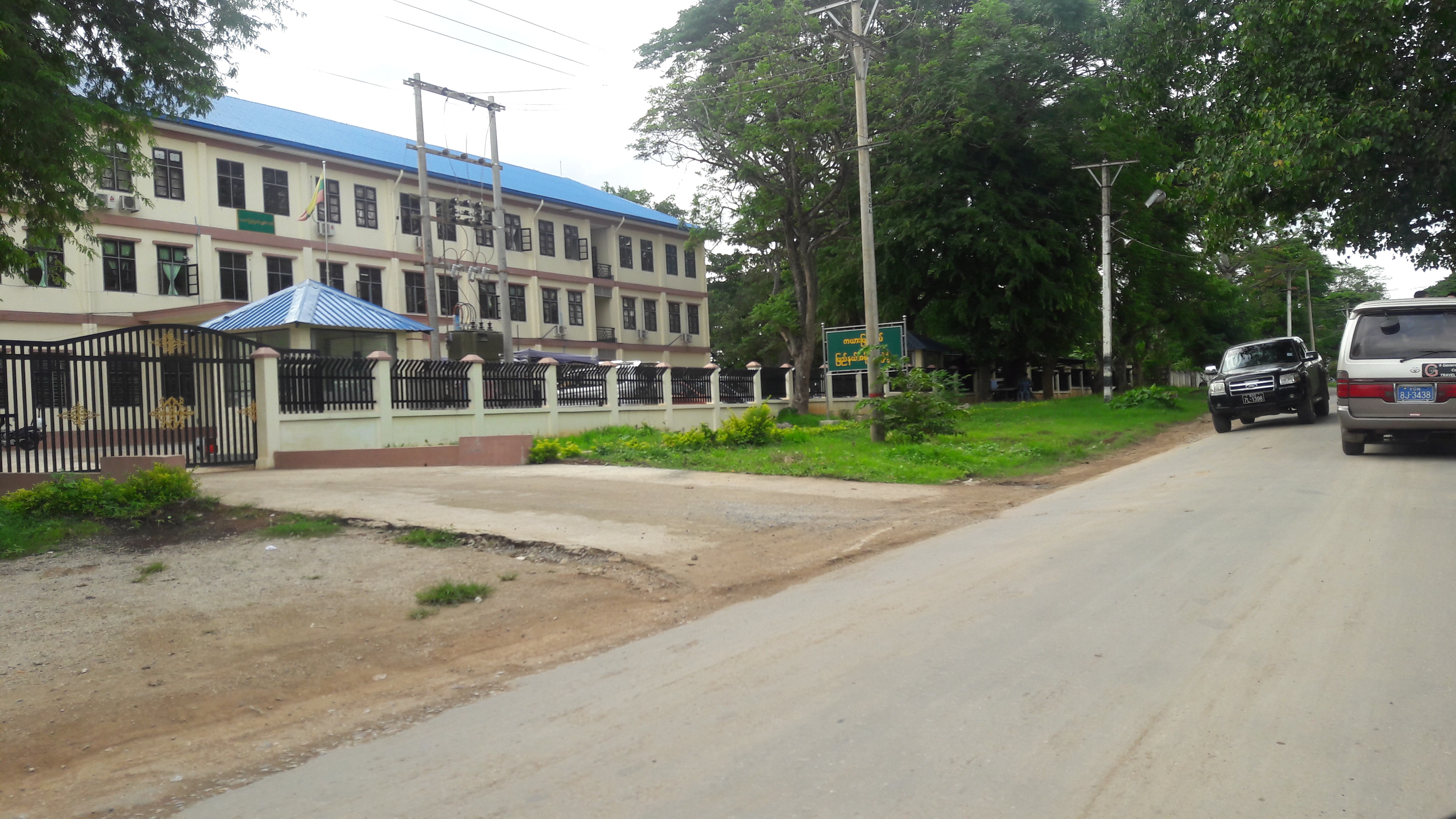
the government sub-office

== Cabinet ==
=== April 2016–2021 ===
No.	Name	Portfolio
(1)	L Phaung Sho (2016-2020)	Chief Minister
(1)	Boss Ko (2020-2021) (acting)	Chief Minister
(2)	Myint Wai, Col.	Minister of Security and Border Affairs
(3)	Khin Maung Phyu	Minister of Road, Communication and Electricity
(4)	Boss Ko	Minister of Agriculture, Livestock and Irrigation
(5)	Aung Kyaw Htay, Dr.	Minister of Municipal and Social Affairs
(6)	T Yal	Minister of Natural Resources and Environment
(7)	Maw Maw	Minister of Planning and Finance
(8)	Hla Myo Swe	Minister of Bamar Ethnic Affairs
(9)	Sai Kyaw Zan	State Advocate
(10)	Aung Maung	State Auditor
