= Hong Ngai (politician) =

Chief Minister of Chin State (2011-2016)

- ဟုန်ငိုင်း
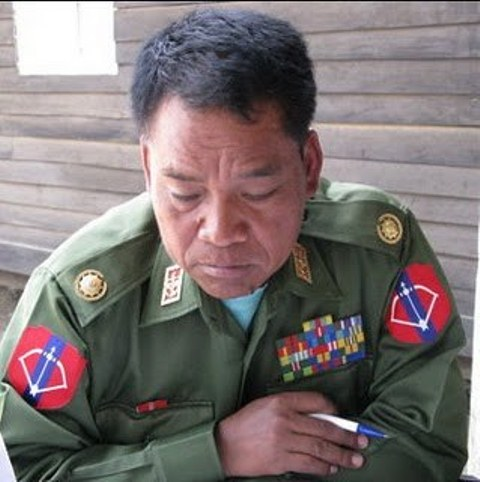

Chief Minister of Chin State
- In office March 2011 – 30 March 2016
- Succeeded by: Salai Lian Luai

Representative of Chin State Hluttaw
- In office 2011 – 30 March 2016
- Preceded by: Office established
- Constituency: Mindat Township No. 2

Personal details
- Born: Burma
- Party: Union Solidarity and Development Party

Military service
- Branch/service: Myanmar Army
- Rank: Brigadier General

Pu Hong Ngai (Burmese: ဟုန်ငိုင်း) served as the Chief Minister of Chin State, Myanmar from 2011 to 2016. Hong Ngai is a retired Brigadier General and former chairman of Chin State Peace and Development Council.

A member of the Union Solidarity and Development Party, he was elected to represent Mindat Township Constituency No. 2 as a Chin State Hluttaw representative in the 2010 Burmese general election.
