= Kayin State Hluttaw =

Kayin State Hluttaw ကရင်ပြည်နယ်လွှတ်တော်
- 3rd Kayin State Hluttaw

Type
- Type: Unicameral

History
- Founded: 8 February 2016

Leadership
- Speaker: San Ko, USDP since 20 March 2026
- Deputy Speaker: Aye Min Htwe, USDP since 20 March 2026

Structure
- Seats: 23; 17 elected MPs; 6 military appointees
- Political groups: National League for Democracy (13)* Military (6); Union Solidarity and Development Party (3) Kayin People's Party (1)

Elections
- Last election: 2025-26 general election

Meeting place
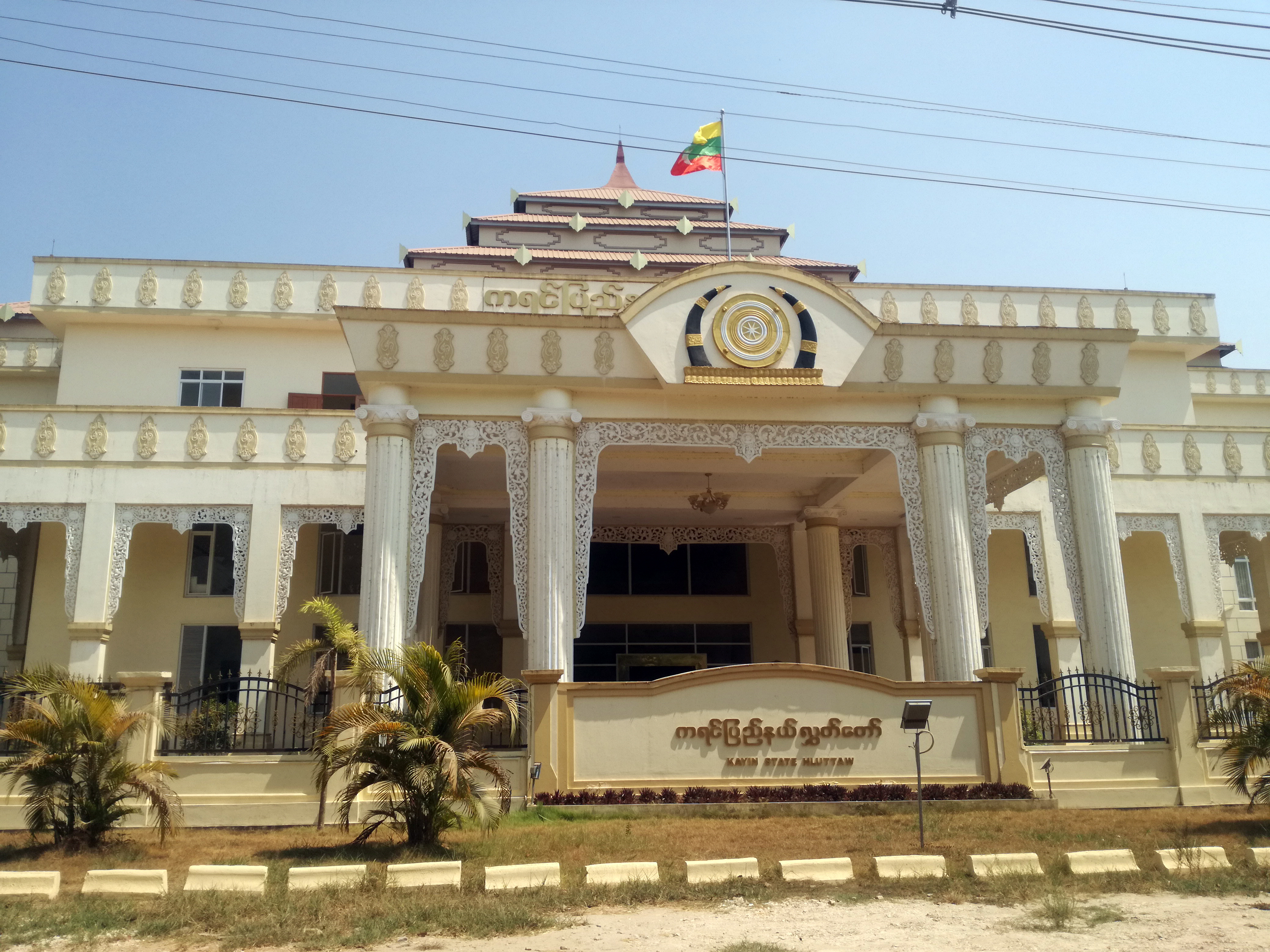
- State Hluttaw Meeting Hall; Hpa-An, Kayin State

Website
- kayinstate.hluttaw.mm

Kayin State Hluttaw (S'gaw Karen: ကညီကီၢ်စဲၣ်ဘျီၣ်ဒိၣ်, Burmese: ကရင်ပြည်နယ်လွှတ်တော်; lit. 'Kayin State Assembly') is the legislature of the Burmese state of Kayin State. It is a unicameral body, consisting of 23 members, including 17 elected members and 6 military representatives. As of March 2026, the Hluttaw was led by speaker San Ko of the Union Solidarity and Development Party (USDP).

In the 2025 general election, the USDP won the most contested seats in the legislature.

== Election results ==
=== 2015 ===
Party	Seats	+/–	Seats %
National League for Democracy (NLD)	13	▲13	56.52
Union Solidarity and Development Party (USDP)	3	▼4	13.04
Kayin People's Party (KPP)	1	▼1	4.35
Phalon-Sawaw Democratic Party (PSPD)	0	▼4	0.00
AMDRDP	0	▼2	0.00
Kayin State Democracy and Development Party (KSDDP)	0	▼1	0.00
Independent	0	▼1	0.00
Military appointees	6		26.09
Total	23		100

== See also ==
- State and Region Hluttaws
- Pyidaungsu Hluttaw
