= Nang Khin Htwe Myint =

Burmese politician

His Excellency Nan Khin Htwe Myint
- နန်းခင်ထွေးမြင့်
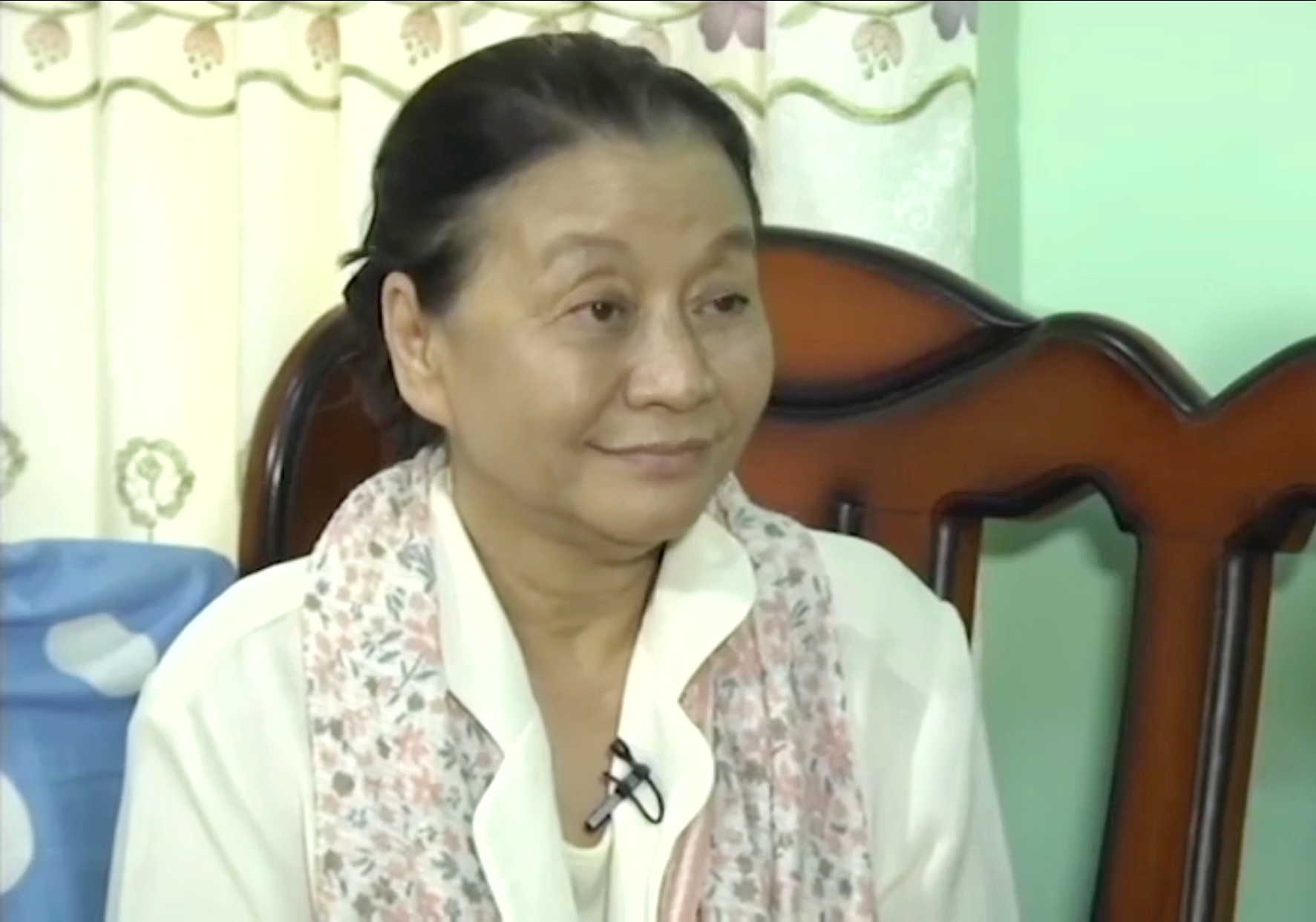

2nd Chief Minister of Kayin State
- In office March 30, 2016 – 1 February 2021
- Appointed by: President of Myanmar
- President: Htin Kyaw
- Preceded by: Zaw Min
- Succeeded by: Saw Myint Oo

Member-elect of Pyithu Hluttaw (1990)
- Preceded by: Constituency established
- Succeeded by: Constituency abolished
- Constituency: Hpa-An № 3
- Majority: 18,423 (74%)

Personal details
- Born: 10 May 1954 Hpa-An, Kayin State, Burma
- Died: 7 May 2026 (aged 71)
- Party: National League for Democracy
- Parent(s): Saw Hla Tun (father); Ahmar (mother)
- Cabinet: Kayin State Government

Nan Khin Htwe Myint (Burmese: နန်းခင်ထွေးမြင့်, also spelt Nan Khin Htwe Myint; born 10 May 1954) is a Burmese politician who served as Chief Minister of Kayin State, the head of Kayin State Government. She is one of just two women to secure a spot among the chief ministers.

== Early life and education ==
She was born to Dr Saw Hla Tun, a former Chief Minister of Kayin State and Ahmar of ethnic Kayin parents. She holds a bachelor's degree in economics.

== Political career ==
The BSPP government imprisoned her in 1975 because of her participation in the June students’ demonstration at Rangoon University. At the time she was a second year student at the Rangoon Institute of Economics. She was released from prison in 1978.

Nan was arrested on 10 February 1998 while on her way to Rangoon to attend celebrations for the 51st Anniversary of Union Day. Military Intelligence Service officers from Unit 25 based in Hpa-An detained her at Thaton station. The intelligence officers had followed her since she left her home, and when she arrived at Thaton station the officers searched her bag and returned it to her with some belongings missing. An argument ensued and the officers arrested her on the grounds that she had obstructed the officers in their duties. She was tried and convicted the following day under Penal Code Article 353 and sentenced to two years imprisonment by the Thaton court. Her family knew nothing of what had happened to her until they heard that she was in prison. She was not allowed to hire a lawyer to represent her nor call any witnesses to testify in court.

In the 1990 elections, she was elected as the Pyithu Hluttaw MP for Constituency No. 3 of Hpa-An, Kayin State winning a majority of 18,423 (74% of the votes), but was not allowed to assume his seat. After the 8888 Uprising, she left the Department of Domestic Revenue. According to the National League for Democracy, her arrest had been set-up since she had previously had a heated argument with Major Khin Maung Kyi, who was the commander of the intelligence unit that arrested her. she was working and began to the National League for Democracy. In June 1992, she attended a pre-National Convention meeting organised by the SLORC as a representative of the National League for Democracy. She won again in the 2012 by-election, and also in the 2015 Myanmar general election, she won the MP seat of Kayin State Hluttaw for Hpa-An and became Chief minister of Kayin State.

In the wake of the 2021 Myanmar coup d'état on 1 February, Nan Khin Htwe Myint was detained by the Myanmar Armed Forces.
