= Min Min Oo =

Burmese politician and engineer

- မင်းမင်းဦး
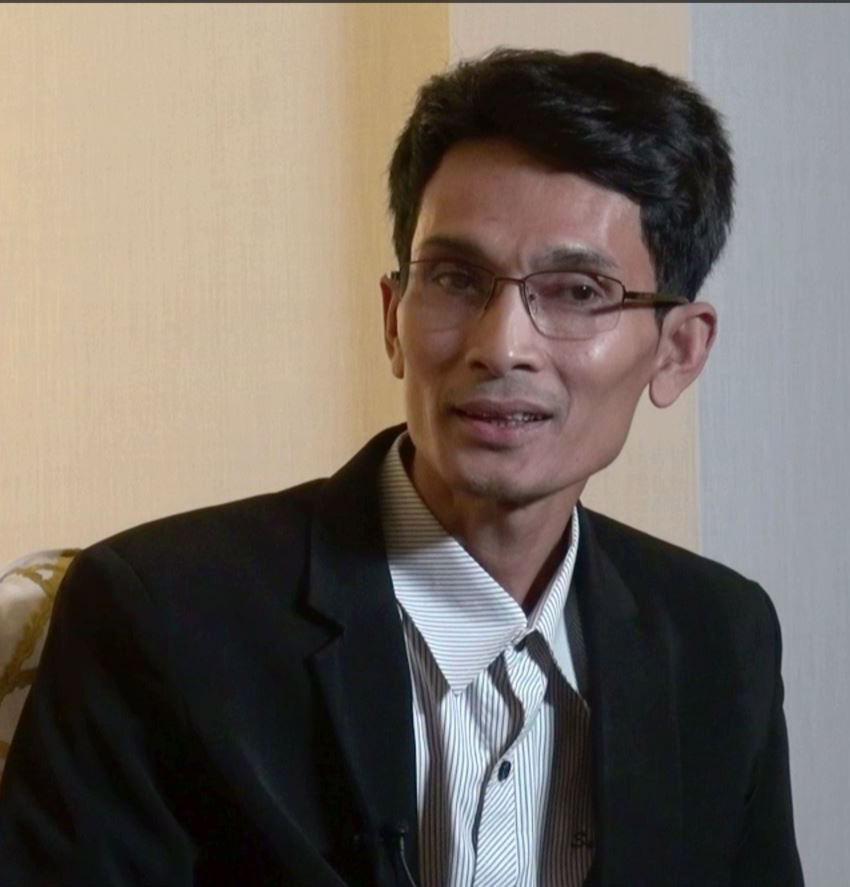

2nd Chief Minister of Mon State
- In office March 30, 2016 – February 23, 2017
- President: Htin Kyaw
- Succeeded by: Aye Zan

Minister of Municipal and Construction of Mon State
- Preceded by: Aye Zan

Personal details
- Born: Taungzone village Bilin Township
- Education: Yangon Institute of Technology

Min Min Oo (Burmese: မင်းမင်းဦး) is a Burmese politician and electrical engineer who served as Chief Minister of Mon State from 30 March 2016 to 23 February 2017.

== Early life ==
He was a student leader during the 1988 student uprising. He is the vice chair of the NLD office in Bilin Township, where he won a seat in the state parliament. He is also head of finance for Bilin Township's rubber plantation association, and a member of Taungzone Hospital's administrative committee.

== Chief Minister ==
The president, Htin Kyaw let him to drop out on February 23, 2017.
