= Kachin State Hluttaw =

Legislature of Kachin State, Myanmar

Kachin State Hluttaw Kachin Mungdaw Rapdaw ကချင်ပြည်နယ်လွှတ်တော်
- 3rd Kachin State Hluttaw

Type
- Type: Unicameral

History
- Founded: 8 February 2016

Leadership
- Speaker: Rawan Jon, USDP since 18 March 2026
- Deputy Speaker: Thein Tun Aye, USDP since 18 March 2026

Structure
- Seats: 53; 40 elected MPs; 13 military appointees
- Political groups: National League for Democracy (26)* Union Solidarity and Development Party (7); Kachin State Democracy Party (3); Lisu National Development Party (2); Shan Nationalities League for Democracy (1); Unity and Democracy Party of Kachin State (1) Military (13)

Elections
- Last election: 8 November 2015

Meeting place
- State Hluttaw Meeting Hall; Myitkyina, Kachin State

Footnotes
- Includes four 'Ethnic Ministers (Bamar, Shan, Lisu, Rawang)' from the NLD.

Entrance to the Kachin State Hluttaw.

Kachin State Hluttaw (Burmese: ကချင်ပြည်နယ် လွှတ်တော်; lit. 'Kachin State Assembly') is the legislature of Kachin State in Myanmar (Burma). It is a unicameral body, consisting of 53 members, including 40 elected members and 13 military representatives. As of March 2026, the Hluttaw was led by speaker Rawan Jon of the Union Solidarity and Development Party (USDP).

== General Elections ==
=== 2010 ===
Seats of Kachin State Hluttaw by Parties (November 2010)
Party	Seats	Net Gain/Loss	Seats %	Votes %	Votes	+/-
USDP	20		39.22			
NUP	11		21.57			
SNLD	4		7.84			
UDPKS	2		3.92			
Independent	1		1.96			
Military appointees	13		25.49			
Total	51		100			

=== 2015 ===
Seats of Kachin State Hluttaw by Parties (result of November 2015)
Party	Seats	Net Gain/Loss	Seats %	Votes %	Votes	+/-
NLD	26	▲26	48.15			
USDP	7	▼13	13.21			
KSDP	3	▲3	5.66			
SNLD	1	▼3	1.89			
LNDP	2	▲2	3.77			
UDPKS	1	▼1	1.89			
Military appointees	13		24.53			
Total	53		100			

Party	Seats	+/–
National League for Democracy (NLD)	26	▲26
Union Solidarity and Development Party (USDP)	7	▼13
Kachin State Democracy Party (KSDP)	3	▲3
Lisu National Development Party (LNDP)	2	▲2
Shan Nationalities League for Democracy (SNLD)	1	▼3
Unity and Democracy Party of Kachin State (UDPKS)	1	▼1
National Unity Party (NUP)	0	▼11
Independent	0	▼1

The 2015 election results are as of 20 November 2015. 4 Ethnic Affair Ministers posts won by NLD's candidates are included in that party's total 26 seats.

== See also ==
- State and Region Hluttaws
- Pyidaungsu Hluttaw
