= Ayeyarwady Region Government =

Regional government in Myanmar

- ဧရာဝတီတိုင်းဒေသကြီးအစိုးရအဖွဲ့

- Flag of Ayeyarwady Region

Government overview
- Formed: 30 March 2010
- Jurisdiction: Ayeyarwady Region Hluttaw
- Headquarters: 2200 Sa Ka Wa Street, Pathein, Ayeyarwady Region
- Government executive: Tin Maung Win, Chief Minister
- Parent department: Government of Myanmar
- Website: www.ayeyarwadyregion.gov.mm

Ayeyarwady Region Government is the cabinet of Ayeyarwady Region. The cabinet is led by chief minister, Tin Maung Win.

== Cabinet (April 2016–present) ==
No.	Name	Portfolio
(1)	Mahn Johnny(30 March 2016 – 9 January 2018); Hla Moe Aung	Chief Minister
(2)	Kyaw Swar Hlaing, Col.	Minister of Security and Border Affairs
(3)	Htay Win	Minister of Planning and Finance
(4)	Ba Hein ( 5 April 2016 - 9 January 2018) Tin Aung Win	Minister of Agriculture, Livestock, Natural Resources and Environment
(5)	Win Htay	Minister of Electricity, Energy, Industry and Transportation
(6)	Kyaw Myint	Minister of Municipal Affairs
(7)	Hla Myat Thway, Dr.	Minister of Social Affairs
(8)	Ga Moe Myat Myat Thu	Minister of Kayin Ethnic Affairs
(9)	Tin Saw	Minister of Rakhine Ethnic Affairs
(10)	Yin Yin Han	Region Advocate
(11)	San San Khaing	Region Auditor

စဉ်	အမည်	ဝန်ကြီးဌာန
(၁)	မန်းဂျော်နီ (၂၀၁၆-၂၀၁၈); လှမိုးအောင်	ဝန်ကြီးချုပ်
(၂)	ဗိုလ်မှူးကြီးကျော်စွာလှိုင်	လုံခြုံရေးနှင့်နယ်စပ်ရေးရာဝန်ကြီးဌာန
(၃)	ဦးလှကျော်	စီမံကိန်းနှင့် ဘဏ္ဍာရေးဝန်ကြီးဌာန
(၄)	ဦးတင်အောင်ဝင်း	စိုက်ပျိုးရေး၊ မွေးမြူရေး၊ သယံဇာတနှင့် ပတ်ဝန်းကျင် ထိန်းသိမ်းရေး ဝန်ကြီးဌာန
(၅)	ဦးဝင်းဌေး	လျှပ်စစ်၊ စွမ်းအင်၊ စက်မှုလက်မှုနှင့် လမ်းပန်းဆက်သွယ်ရေး ဝန်ကြီးဌာန
(၆)	ဦးကျော်မြင့်	စည်ပင်သာယာရေးဝန်ကြီးဌာန
(၇)	ဒေါက်တာလှမြတ်သွေး	လူမှုရေးဝန်ကြီးဌာန
(၈)	ဂါ့မိုးမြတ်မြတ်သူ	ကရင်တိုင်းရင်းသားလူမျိုးရေးရာဝန်ကြီးဌာန
(၉)	ဦးတင်စော	ရခိုင်တိုင်းရင်းသားလူမျိုးရေးရာဝန်ကြီးဌာန
(၁၀)	ဒေါ်ယဥ္ယဥ္ ဟန်	ပြည်နယ်ဥပဒေချုပ်
(၁၁)	ဒေါ်စန်းစန်းခိုင်	ပြည်နယ်စာရင်းစစ်ချုပ်

== Cabinet (2021- present) ==
This cabinet is the cabinet appointed by the State Administration Council.

No.	Name	Portfolio
(1)	Tin Maung Win	Chief Minister
(2)	Kyaw Swar Hlaing, Col.	Minister of Security and Border Affairs
(3)	U Tin Aye	Minister of Economy
(4)	U Ohn Myint	Minister of Resources
(5)	Tin Zaw Tun, Police Col.	Minister of Transportation
(6)	Maung Maung Than	Minister of Social Affairs
(7)	Saw Linn Khal	Minister of Ethnic Affairs
