= Katha Township =

- Township
- Location in Katha district

- Location in Sagaing region

- Location in Burma
- Coordinates: 24°13′N 96°08′E
- Country: Burma
- Region: Sagaing Region
- District: Katha District
- Capital: Katha
- Time zone: UTC+6.30 (MST)

Katha Township is a township in Katha District in the Sagaing Region of Burma. The principal town is Katha. The township is served by a branch (east-west) railway line that leaves the main line just north of Indaw.

The township was the site of the Katha Township operation during the 2021 Myanmar civil war. On 15 March 2025, State Administration Council troops attempted to recapture rural positions in the township held by the People's Defence Force anti-junta troops. Ultimately the junta troops were repelled from the territory.
