= Kayah State Hluttaw =

Kayah State Hluttaw ကယားပြည်နယ်လွှတ်တော်
- 2nd Kayah State Hluttaw

Type
- Type: Unicameral

History
- Founded: 8 February 2016

Leadership
- Speaker: Hla Htwe, NLD since 8 February 2016
- Deputy Speaker: Tin Myint, NLD since 8 February 2016

Structure
- Seats: 20; 15 elected MPs; 5 military appointees
- Political groups: National League for Democracy (11) Military (5) Union Solidarity and Development Party (4)*

Elections
- Last election: 8 November 2015

Meeting place
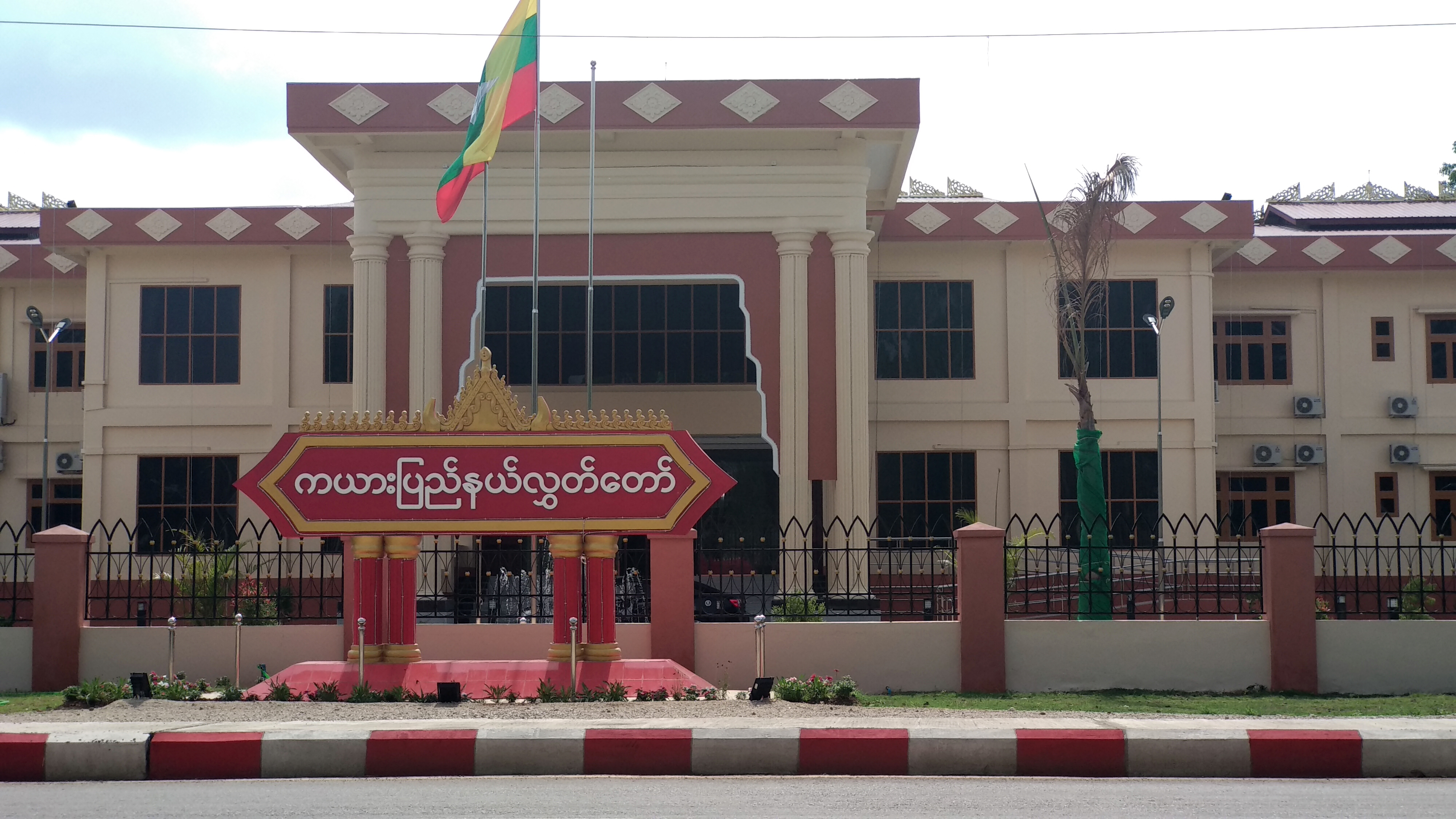
- State Hluttaw Meeting Hall; Loikaw, Kayah State

Footnotes
- Includes one 'Ethnic Minister (Bamar)' from the USDP.

Kayah State Hluttaw (Burmese: ကယားပြည်နယ်လွှတ်တော်; lit. 'Kayah State Assembly') is the legislature of the Burmese state of Kayah State. It is a unicameral body, consisting of 20 members, including 15 elected members and 5 military representatives. As of February 2016, the Hluttaw was led by speaker Hla Htwe of the National League for Democracy (NLD).

The first election for Kayah State Hluttaw was held in November 2010 and all seats elected were from Union Solidarity and Development Party. In 2015 general election, the NLD won the most contested seats (11 out of 15 contested seats) in the legislature.

Seats of Kachin State Hluttaw by Parties (November 2015)
Party	Seats	Net Gain/Loss	Seats %	Votes %	Votes	+/-
NLD	11	▲11	55			
USDP	4	▼11	20			
Military appointees	5		25			
Total	20		100			

Ethnic Affair Minister is elected from USDP in 2015.

== See also ==
- State and Region Hluttaws
- Pyidaungsu Hluttaw
- Kayah State Government
