= Ayeyarwady Region Hluttaw =

Regional legislature in Myanmar

Ayeyarwady Region Hluttaw ဧရာဝတီတိုင်းဒေသကြီးလွှတ်တော်
- 3rd Ayeyarwady Region Hluttaw

Type
- Type: Unicameral

History
- Founded: 8 February 2016

Leadership
- Speaker: Aung Kyaw Khaing, NLD since 8 February 2016
- Deputy Speaker: San Min Aung, NLD since 8 February 2016 - January 2019
- Deputy Speaker: San Htway, NLD since 28 February 2019

Structure
- Seats: 72; 54 elected MPs; 18 military appointees
- Political groups: National League for Democracy (51)* Union Solidarity and Development Party (3) Military (18)

Elections
- Last election: 8 November 2015

Meeting place
- Region Hluttaw Meeting Hall; Pathein, Ayeyarwady Region

Footnotes
- Includes two 'Ethnic Ministers (Kayin, Rakhine)' from the NLD.

Ayeyarwady Region Hluttaw (Burmese: ဧရာဝတီတိုင်းဒေသကြီးလွှတ်တော်; lit. 'Ayeyarwady Region Assembly') is the legislature of Ayeyarwady Region of Myanmar. It is a unicameral body, consisting of 72 members, including 54 elected members and 18 military representatives. As of February 2016, the Hluttaw was led by speaker Aung Kyaw Khaing of the National League for Democracy (NLD).

As of the 2015 general election, the NLD won the most contested seats in the legislature, based on the most recent election results.

== General Election results (Nov. 2015) ==
Party	Seats	+/–
National League for Democracy (NLD)	51	▲50
Union Solidarity and Development Party (USDP)	3	▼44
National Unity Party (NUP)	0	▼6
Military Appointed	18	
Total	72	

== See also ==
- State and Region Hluttaws
- Pyidaungsu Hluttaw
