= Tanintharyi Region Hluttaw =

Legislature of Tanintharyi Region, Myanmar

Tanintharyi Region Hluttaw တနင်္သာရီတိုင်းဒေသကြီးလွှတ်တော်
- 3rd Tanintharyi Region Hluttaw

Type
- Type: Unicameral
- Established: 31 January 2011; 15 years ago

Leadership
- Speaker: U Myat Ko, USDP since 20-3-2026
- Deputy Speaker: U Khin Maung Myint, USDP since 20-3-2026

Structure
- Seats: 28; 21 elected MPs; 7 Tatmadaw appointees
- Political groups: USDP: 15* seats PP: 4 seats MFDP: 2 seats Tatmadaw: 7 seats

Elections
- Last election: 2025–26 Myanmar general election

Meeting place
- Region Hluttaw Meeting Hall; Dawei, Tanintharyi Region

Footnotes
- Includes one 'Ethnic Minister (Kayin)' from the USDP.

Tanintharyi Region Hluttaw (Burmese: တနင်္သာရီတိုင်းဒေသကြီးလွှတ်တော်; lit. 'Tanintharyi Region Assembly') is the legislature of Tanintharyi Region, Myanmar. It is a unicameral body, consisting of 28 members, including 21 elected members and seven military representatives. As of February 2016, the Hluttaw was led by speaker Khin Maung Aye of the National League for Democracy (NLD).

As of the 2015 general election, the NLD won every contested seat in the legislature, based on the most recent election results.

== General election results (Nov. 2015) ==
Party	Seats	+/–
National League for Democracy (NLD)	21	▲21
Union Solidarity and Development Party (USDP)	0	▼20
National Unity Party (NUP)	0	▼1
Military appointed	7	
Total	28	

== See also ==
- Pyidaungsu Hluttaw
- State and Regional Hluttaws
