= Thant Wai Kyaw =

Burmese politician

Member of the Sagaing Region Hluttaw
- Incumbent
- Assumed office 3 February 2016
- Constituency: Kale Township № 1
- Majority: 62,459 votes

Personal details
- Born: 25 April 1986 (age 40) Kalay, Myanmar
- Party: National League for Democracy
- Spouse: Soe Thu Nyunt (husband)
- Children: Thwin Htoo Eain (son)
- Parent: Than (father)
- Education: B.Sc (Phys)
- Occupation: Politician; newscaster

Thant Wai Kyaw (Burmese: သန့်ဝေကျော်) is a Burmese newscaster and politician, who currently serves as a member of parliament in the Sagaing Region Hluttaw for Kale Township No. 1 Constituency. She is a member of the National League for Democracy.

== Early life and education ==
Thant Wai Kyaw was born on 25 April 1986 in Kalay, Sagaing Region, Myanmar. She graduated with B.Sc (Phys).

== Political career ==
From 2012 till 2014, she was selected as one of the youth leaders of NYC in Sagaing Region for the National Youth Congress and as an executive Committee member at the ward and village tract level for the 2013 NLD nationwide conference.

In the 2015 Myanmar general election, she contested the Sagaing Region Hluttaw from Kale Township No. 1 parliamentary constituency, winning a majority of 62,459 votes. She is currently serves as member in Budget, Regional Planning and France Committee and Ethnic Affairs Committee. She also serves as a member of Sagaing Region Youth Affairs Committee.

In the aftermath of the 2021 Myanmar coup d'état, she joined the National Unity Government’s news agency, delivering a popular weekly news segment for People's Voice Television (PVTV) called Phyitgyaung Konsin Anyar Takhwin (ဖြစ်ကြောင်းကုန်စင် အညာတစ်ခွင်), which recounts events and ongoing conflicts in the Bamar heartland. In January 2022, her home in Kalay was chained up by military troops after she was charged under section 505 of the Myanmar Penal Code.
