= Sagaing Region Government =

- စစ်ကိုင်းတိုင်းဒေသကြီးအစိုးရအဖွဲ့
- Seal of the Government

- Flag of Sagaing Region

Agency overview
- Formed: 30 March 2011
- Jurisdiction: Sagaing Region Hluttaw
- Agency executive: Dr Myint Naing, Chief Minister
- Parent department: Government of Myanmar
- Website: www.sagaingregion.gov.mm

Sagaing Region Government is the cabinet of Sagaing Region. The cabinet is led by chief minister, Myint Naing.

== Cabinet (2016-) ==
No	Name	Term of service			Ministry
No	Name	Took office	Left office	Days	Ministry
1	Myint Naing	30 March 2016	Incumbent	5264	Chief Minister
2	Col Kyaw Thant Naing	5 April 2016	22 May 2018	777	Ministry of Security and Border Affairs
2	Col Than Tun Aung	22 May 2018	Incumbent	3384	Ministry of Security and Border Affairs
3	Soe Oo	5 April 2016	Incumbent	3431	Ministry of Planning and Finance
4	Kam Za Mon	5 April 2016	Incumbent	3431	Ministry of Agriculture, Livestock and Irrigation
5	Than Nyunt Win	5 April 2016	Incumbent	3431	Ministry of Electricity, Technical, Road and Communication
6	Myint Kyi	5 April 2016	Incumbent	3431	Ministry of Municipal
7	Zaw Win	5 April 2016	Incumbent	3431	Ministry of Social Affairs
8	Hmwe Hmwe Khin	30 March 2016	Incumbent	3437	Ministry of Shan Ethnic Affairs
9	Lar Htaung Htan	30 March 2016	Incumbent	3437	Ministry of Chin Ethnic Affairs
10	Khin Maung Hla	7 April 2016	Incumbent	3429	Region Advocate
11	Soe Lwin	7 April 2016	Incumbent	3429	Region Auditor
