= Khant Wai Phyo =

Burmese politician and activist

- ခန့်ဝေဖြိုး

Minister of Planning and Finance of the Sagaing Federal Unit Interim Government
- Incumbent
- Assumed office November 2025
- President: Duwa Lashi La (Acting)
- Prime Minister: Mahn Win Khaing Than

Personal details
- Education: Monywa University of Economics
- Occupation: Politician, activist
- Known for: Anti-coup protests, Monywa People's Strike Leading Committee

Khant Wai Phyo (ခန့်ဝေဖြိုး) is a Burmese politician and anti-coup activist. He is currently serving as the Minister of Planning and Finance for the Sagaing Federal Unit Interim Government, an administrative body formed in opposition to the 2021 military coup.

== Early life and activism ==
Khant Wai Phyo was a student leader at the Monywa University of Economics, serving in the Students' Union. Following the 2021 Myanmar coup d'état, he emerged as a leader of the Monywa People's Strike Leading Committee, organizing large-scale protests against the military junta in the Sagaing Region.

== Political career ==
In late 2025, He expanded his activism to Mandalay, where he co-led "flash mob" style protests to boycott the military-planned elections alongside other activists such as Tayzar San and Nan Lin.

In November 2025, the Sagaing Federal Unit Hluttaw appointed him as the Minister of Planning and Finance for the interim regional government. In this capacity, he oversees financial planning and coordination for the resistance-led administration in the Sagaing Region.

== Legal proceedings ==
Following anti-election protests in Mandalay in December 2025, military authorities filed charges against him under Section 23(b) of the Electoral Protection Law at the Chanayethazan Township police station. The authorities subsequently announced a monetary reward for information leading to his arrest.
