= Zaw Win (politician) =

Burmese politician

Dr Zaw Win
- ဇော်ဝင်း

Minister of Social Affairs for Sagaing Region

Member of the Sagaing Region Hluttaw
- Incumbent
- Assumed office 1 February 2016
- Constituency: Ayadaw Township №.1
- Majority: 32,754 votes

Personal details
- Born: Ayadaw, Myanmar
- Party: National League for Democracy
- Cabinet: Sagaing Region Government

Zaw Win (Burmese: ဇော်ဝင်း) is a Burmese politician who currently serves as Minister of Social Affairs for Sagaing Region and MP for Ayadaw Township №.1.

== Political career ==
In the 2015 Myanmar general election, he was elected as a Sagaing Region Hluttaw MP, winning a majority of 32,754 votes, from Ayadaw Township No.1 parliamentary constituency. He also serving as a Regional Minister of Social Affairs for Sagaing Region and as chairman of Sagaing Region Youth Affairs Committee.
