= Thinzar Shunlei Yi =

Burmese human rights activist (born 1991)

- သဉ္ဇာရွှန်းလဲ့ရည်
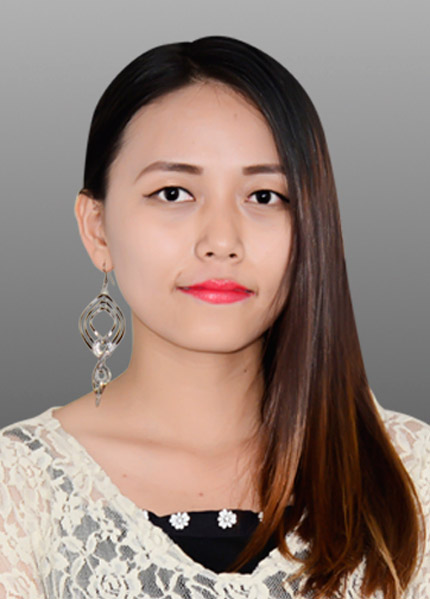
- Thinzar Shunlei Yi, c. 2016
- Born: 14 November 1991 (age 35); Sagaing, Myanmar
- Education: Yangon University of Education
- Occupations: Television host; author; teacher
- Years active: 2012–present
- Known for: Anti-Tatmadaw activism, organizing Burmese anti-junta protests, mental health activism, hosting Under 30 Dialogue and organizing the #Sisters2Sisters campaign
- Awards: Emerging Young Leader Award; Women of the Future Awards Southeast Asia (Media & Communications); Magnitsky Human Rights Award; Obama Foundation Leader for Asia Pacific
- Thinzar Shunlei Yi's voice On the Tatmadaw's use of wartime sexual violence following the 2021 Burmese coup d'état (in English); Recorded 16 December 2021

Thinzar Shunlei Yi (Note: Also transliterated Thinzar Shun Lei Yi) (Burmese: သဉ္ဇာရွှန်းလဲ့ရည်; born 14 November 1991) is a Burmese pro-democracy activist and television host. Following the 2021 Burmese coup d'état, she helped organize mass protests against the Tatmadaw (Myanmar's military). Born in Sagaing to a military family, she originally trained to become a high school teacher, graduating from the Yangon University of Education in 2013. Between 2012 and 2016, Thinzar Shunlei Yi was politically active in executive positions of several youth organizations, and later became a television host on Under 30 Dialogue, a youth-oriented television programme. In 2018, she was charged for unlawful protest against the Rohingya genocide, and was convicted in 2020. After organizing protests against the Tatmadaw in the wake of the 2021 coup d'état, she fled to the jungle and briefly joined an armed rebel group. She lives in exile in Thailand as of 2022, and runs the #Sisters2Sisters anti-wartime sexual violence campaign. She has received the Magnitsky Human Rights Award, and further honors from Women of the Future, the Obama Foundation, and the US Department of State.

== Early life ==
Thinzar Shunlei Yi was born in military barracks on 14 November 1991 in Sagaing, Myanmar, to a Kachin Christian (Note: The Times refers to Thinzar Shunlei Yi's mother as Buddhist) mother and a Burmese Buddhist father who was an army captain. She is the eldest of three children. Being the daughter of a military family, she spent the first sixteen years of her life on military compounds, rarely leaving. According to Thinzar Shunlei Yi, her family felt "superior to the other people" outside of the compounds or of lower military rank than her father and enjoyed deference from them. Conversely, her family was expected to respect soldiers of superior military rank and their families. Receiving most of her education from military high schools and Bamar Buddhist institutes, she supported the Tatmadaw as a child. She was taught to "despise" Aung San Suu Kyi. In high school, she witnessed the Saffron Revolution and the ensuing government crackdown, and began "hating" the military regime. Her family disallowed her from attending any of the protests. As a teenager, she was sexually assaulted by a tutor. She experienced clinical depression, and attributed the incident to karma for her actions in a past life at the time. Her family moved every two years, living in Rakhine State and Mon State, among others, and finally settled in Yangon around 2007 to 2010.

She attended the Yangon University of Education, training to become a high school teacher. There, during one of her presentations on voter education, she was forced off stage by a teacher in an incident that would inspire her later political activism. She graduated in 2013 with a B.Ed, and subsequently worked as a teacher.

== Political activism ==
=== Before 2021 ===
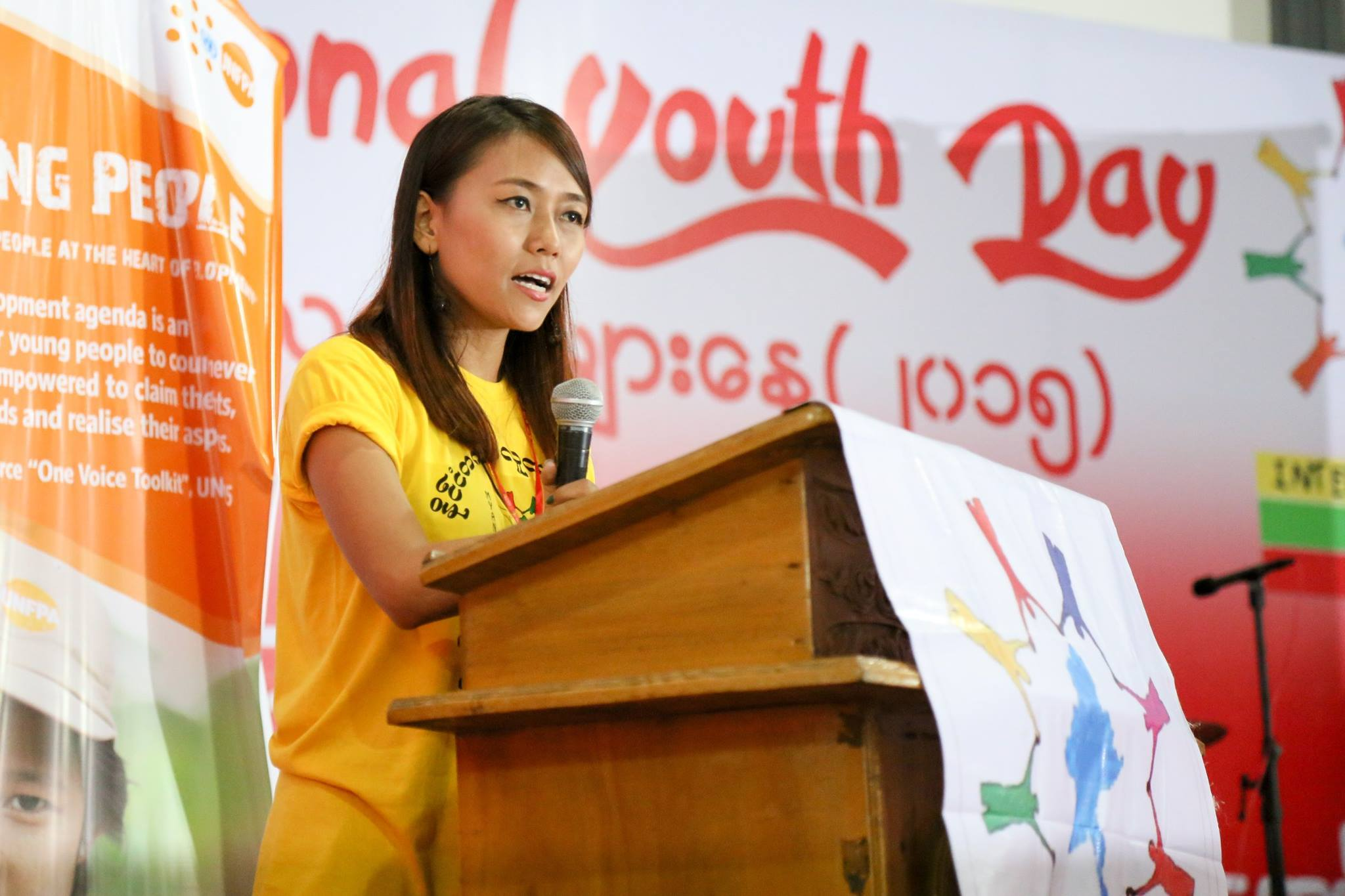
Thinzar Shunlei Yi speaking at an International Youth Day event

In Yangon, Thinzar Shunlei Yi underwent an ideological change. She grew less supportive of the military after she visited several open forums at the local American Center, taking Aung San Suu Kyi as a role model because she spoke against the Tatmadaw. She learned English at the Center and also volunteered at an orphanage.

She first became politically active in 2012, when she helped organize International Day of Peace and attended a youth forum in Cambodia. She eventually became the first female national coordinator for the National Youth Congress, and the president of the Yangon Youth Network, serving two terms. In 2014, she co-organized the ASEAN Youth Forum, and an International Youth Day celebration, which focused on mental health awareness. During this time, she was frequently harassed online, and her phone number was leaked on pornographic sites. She stopped organizing youth forums in 2016, and began working with the NGO coalition Action Committee for Democracy Development, becoming an advocacy coordinator.

Aung San Suu Kyi is an accomplice to the Rohingya genocide, and her influence in the country is too much, beyond imagination. She’s beyond a national leader. She’s become more like a goddess. We need a new leadership for the younger generation.

— Thinzar Shunlei Yi (2021)

In 2017, she co-founded and began hosting Under 30 Dialogue, a political youth-oriented television programme on Mizzima TV. Sensitive topics such as the Rohingya genocide were often discussed. As a result, the military often attempted to prevent journalists from interviewing her. Following national elections in 2015, Suu Kyi's party, the National League for Democracy (NLD), came into power. In May 2018, Thinzar Shunlei Yi, along with 16 other activists, including poet Maung Saung Kha, were charged with unlawful protest for organizing solidarity protests for internally displaced persons in Kachin State and against the Rohingya genocide. After a two year long trial, they were convicted in July 2020. Given the choice between paying a K5,000 fine or staying in jail for a week, all 17 activists chose the former. Thinzar Shunlei Yi experienced severe disillusionment with Suu Kyi, whom she described as an "accomplice to the Rohingya genocide" with a "personality cult" who is not suited to lead a younger generation. Prior to the 2020 elections, Thinzar Shunlei Yi was planning on establishing a new political party with other activists to challenge the Suu Kyi-controlled NLD and the Tatmadaw. She ultimately boycotted the election because the Rohingya people were not allowed to cast ballots. As of April 2023, her plans to establish a new party are still on hold.

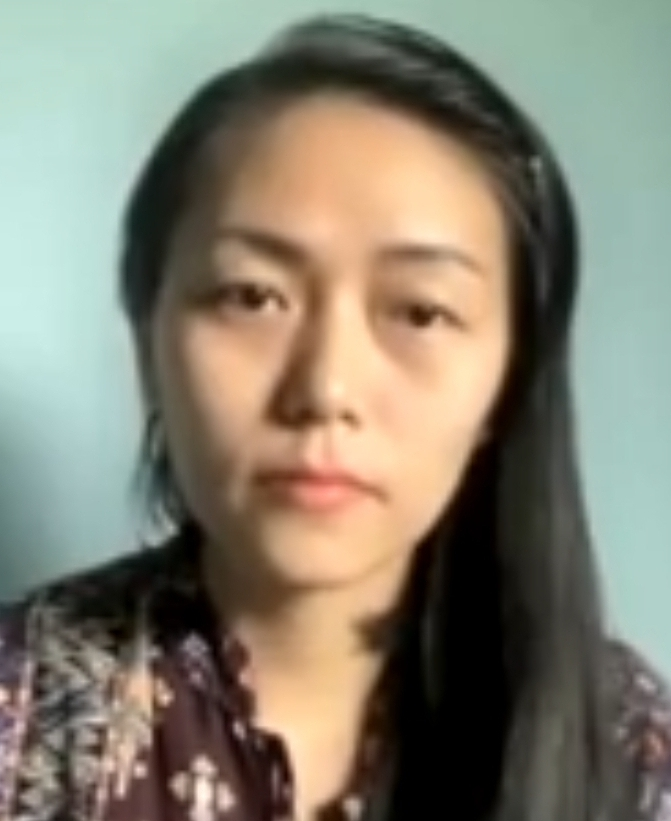
Thinzar Shunlei Yi in a 2021 online interview

=== 2021–present: Post-coup d'etat ===
On 1 February 2021, General Min Aung Hlaing deposed the democratically elected Suu Kyi in a coup d'état, ushering in a military regime that revoked Mizzima TV's license soon after. Thinzar Shunlei Yi, who was residing in her parents' home in Yangon at the time, immediately left and went into hiding to avoid arrest. A warrant was announced in March or on 20 April. She attended and organized several protests during this period, and led a march to the Sule Pagoda. Inter Press Service described her as a "main organiser" of the Civil Disobedience Movement. Frequent doxing by pro-junta accounts posed a significant security risk, so she often switched hiding places in the Yangon region. According to her, approximately thirty of her friends were arrested, and all were physically or sexually abused in custody. In mid-March, she fled Yangon to avoid endangering her family, took refuge in the dense Burmese jungle, joined a rebel group, and trained in the usage of firearms. After a month of training, she decided that she did not want to kill, and left the group. In May, she testified via video link before the Foreign Affairs Select Committee of the British House of Commons about the state of Myanmar under the military junta. In June 2021, she told news media that she was near a border, but refused to specify which one. Soon after, she fled to neighboring Thailand.

She refused to disclose her exact whereabouts in January 2022 for safety reasons. She is a frequent contributor on Western news outlets such as CNN and The Australian, and published an autobiography with a French journalist in 2022. In 2021, Thinzar Shunlei Yi announced the establishment of the #Sisters2Sisters campaign, which aims to raise awareness about sexual violence perpetrated by the military junta, by posting a staged photo of herself with bruises. She invited participants in the campaign to "stage torture photos in solidarity with women in interrogation centers". In 2023, #Sisters2Sisters, in collaboration with Myanmar Witness, analysed over a million posts from 100 pro- and anti-regime Telegram accounts and discovered that abusive language against women increased eightfold following the 2021 coup d'état.

== Awards and honours ==
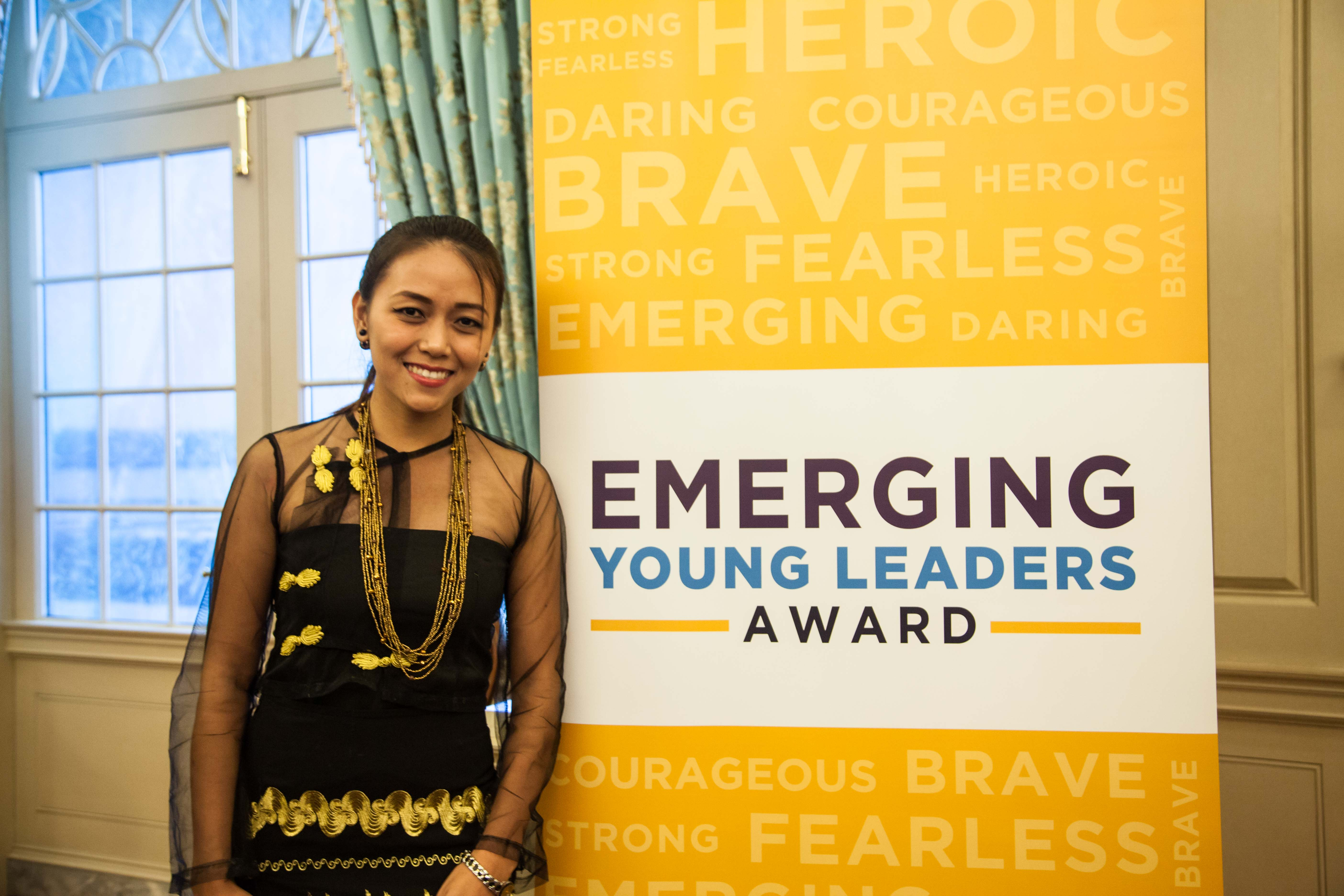
Thinzar Shunlei Yi at the 2016 Emerging Young Leaders Award ceremony

In 2016, Thinzar Shunlei Yi won one of ten Emerging Young Leader Award from the US Department of State for her organization of the ASEAN Youth Forum and International Youth Day celebrations, along with her mental health activism. Three years later, she won in the Media & Communications category of the Women of the Future Awards Southeast Asia. That same year, she became an inaugural Obama Foundation Leader for Asia Pacific. Post coup d'état, she was awarded a Magnitsky Human Rights Award for Outstanding Young Activist for her advocacy for internally displaced persons in Kachin State, her organization of peace marches on the International Day of Peace, and her establishment of the #Sisters2Sisters campaign.
