= Rati Ohn =

Burmese politician

- ရတီအုန်း

Sagaing Federal Unit Interim Government Minister of Municipal Affairs
- Incumbent
- Assumed office December 2025
- Leader: Soe Oo

Personal details
- Occupation: Politician, Mechanical Engineer
- Known for: Civil Disobedience Movement , Sagaing Federal Unit Interim Government

Rati Ohn, also spelt as Yati Ohn, is a Burmese mechanical engineer and politician currently serving as the Minister of Municipal Affairs for the Sagaing Federal Unit Interim Government. She is the only female minister in the cabinet.

Following the 2021 Myanmar coup d'état, she participated in the Civil Disobedience Movement (CDM) and has since been involved in humanitarian, educational, and healthcare activities in conflict-affected areas.

== Early life and education ==
Yati Ohn holds a Bachelor of Engineering (Mechanical) degree. Her mother was a midwife and nurse, which provided her with early exposure to basic maternal healthcare and midwifery. Prior to the 2021 coup, she served as a lecturer and Head of the Automobile Technology Department at the Government Technical High School (GTHS) in Kalay, Sagaing Region. During the 2020 general election, she volunteered as the chairperson of the local election monitoring committee in the Thoma village tract.

== Revolutionary activities ==
On 2 February 2021, Rati Ohn joined the Civil Disobedience Movement (CDM) in protest against the military coup.

=== Healthcare and emergency response ===
In March 2021, she co-founded the Mobile Medical Team (MMT) alongside CDM doctors and healthcare workers to provide emergency medical aid to protesters and displaced persons in Kalay. She later served as a frontline medic in conflict zones. Despite not being a trained medical professional, she has reportedly assisted in the delivery of at least 25 infants for displaced mothers and families of resistance members, often receiving instructions from doctors via telephone during emergencies. Her healthcare initiatives have since expanded to Mingin Township, Kalewa Township, and Tamu Township.

=== Education and vocational training ===
Yati Ohn serves on the Vocational Education Committee under the Ministry of Education of the National Unity Government (NUG). She has organized approximately ten types of vocational training programs, including welding, diesel engine repair, and basic home medicine, for over a thousand students and displaced persons.

=== Disaster risk reduction ===
She has led public awareness campaigns in Sagaing Region regarding air raid safety, which included instructing villagers on the construction of bomb shelters and emergency evacuation protocols.

== Political career ==
In December 2025, she was appointed as the Minister of Municipal Affairs for the Sagaing Federal Unit Interim Government, where she oversees administrative policies and public services in the region.
