= Tha Aye =

Thar Aye
- သာအေး
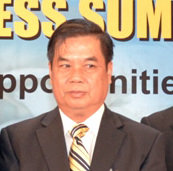
- Tha Aye in 2013

1st Chief Minister of Sagaing Region
- In office 11 February 2011 – 30 March 2016
- Appointed by: President of Myanmar
- President: Thein Sein
- Succeeded by: Myint Naing

Sagaing Region Hluttaw MP
- In office 31 January 2011 – 30 March 2016
- Constituency: Budalin No 2
- Majority: Unopposed

Chief of Bureau of Special Operations 1
- In office May 2009 – 27 August 2010

Personal details
- Born: 16 February 1945 (age 81) Burma
- Party: Union Solidarity and Development Party
- Spouse: Wai Wai Khaing

Military service
- Allegiance: Myanmar
- Branch/service: Myanmar Army
- Rank: Major General

Tha Aye (Burmese: သာအေး) is a former member of the State Peace and Development Council (SPDC) and former Chief Minister of Sagaing Region. He is a former military officer, with the rank of Major General, and previously served as SPDC's Chief of Bureau of Special Operations 1 until a reshuffle on 27 August 2010.

Tha Aye won an uncontested seat in the Sagaing Region Hluttaw during the 2010 Burmese general election, representing Budalin Township Constituency No. 2 under the Union Solidarity and Development Party banner. He was subsequently appointed Chief Minister of Sagaing Region.

Tha Aye was born on 16 February 1945. He is married to Wai Wai Khaing.
