= Lar Htaung Htan =

Burmese politician

Pu Lal Thawng Thang
- လာလ်ထောင်ထန်း

Minister of Chin Ethnic Affairs for Sagaing Region
- Incumbent
- Assumed office 30 March 2016
- Preceded by: Pu No Than Kap

Member of the Sagaing Region Hluttaw
- Incumbent
- Assumed office 1 February 2016
- Constituency: Chin
- Majority: 33,987 votes

Personal details
- Born: Myanmar
- Party: National League for Democracy
- Cabinet: Sagaing Region Government

Lal Thawng Thang (Burmese: လာလ်ထောင်ထန်း) is a Burmese politician who currently serves as Minister of Chin Ethnic Affairs for Sagaing Region and Chin Parliamentary MP for Chin.

== Political career ==
In the 2015 Myanmar general election, he was elected as a Sagaing Region Hluttaw MP, winning a majority of 33,987 votes from Chin parliamentary constituency. He also serving as a Regional Minister of Chin Ethnic Affairs for Sagaing Region.
