= Than Nyunt Win =

Burmese politician

- သန်းညွန့်ဝင်း

Minister of Electricity, Technical, Road and Communication for the Sagaing Region
- Incumbent
- Assumed office 5 April 2016

Member of the Sagaing Region Hluttaw
- Incumbent
- Assumed office 1 February 2016
- Constituency: Ye-U Township №.1

Personal details
- Born: Ye-U, Myanmar
- Party: National League for Democracy
- Cabinet: Sagaing Region Government

Than Nyunt Win (Burmese: သန်းညွန့်ဝင်း) is a Burmese politician who currently serves as Minister of Electricity, Technical, Road and Communication for Sagaing Region and MP for Ye-U Township №.1.

== Political career ==
In the 2015 Myanmar general election, he was elected as a Sagaing Region Hluttaw MP, from Ye-U Township No.1 parliamentary constituency. He also serving as a Regional Minister of Electricity, Technical, Road and Communication for the Sagaing Region .
