= Zaw Win =

Zaw Win may refer to:

- Zaw Win (footballer)
- Zaw Win (politician)
