= Maung Tay =

Burmese politician

Member of the Sagaing Region Hluttaw
- Incumbent
- Assumed office 3 February 2016
- Constituency: Hkamti Township № 1

Personal details
- Born: 21 July 1986 (age 40) Hkamti Township, Myanmar
- Party: Independent politician

Maung Tay (Burmese: မောင်တေး) is a Burmese politician who currently serves as a Sagaing Region Hluttaw member of parliament for Hkamti Township No.1 Constituency. He is an independent politician.

In the 2015 Myanmar general election and the 2020 Myanmar general election, he was elected as a Sagaing Region Hluttaw MP, and an elected representative from Hkamti Township No. 1 parliamentary constituency.
