= Sagaing Federal Unit Interim Government =

Interim government in Sagaing Region, Myanmar

Sagaing Federal Unit Interim Government စစ်ကိုင်းဖက်ဒရယ်ယူနစ်ကြားကာလအစိုးရအဖွဲ့
- Interim government
- Formation: December 23, 2025; 8 months ago
- Founding document: Sagaing Federal Unit Interim Constitution

Legislative branch
- Legislature: Sagaing Federal Unit Hluttaw
- Speaker: U Myint Htwe
- Deputy Speaker: Phyu Phyu Win

Executive branch
- Chief Minister: Soe Oo
- Deputy Chief Minister: Dr Aung Nay Win
- Appointed by: Sagaing Federal Unit Hluttaw
- Departments: 10 ministries

Sagaing Federal Unit Interim Government (Burmese: စစ်ကိုင်းဖက်ဒရယ်ယူနစ်ကြားကာလအစိုးရအဖွဲ့) is a civilian-led administration in Myanmar, coordinated with the National Unity Government (NUG).

In late 2025, the Sagaing Federal Unit drafted an interim constitution, laying the foundation to establish a government to restore public services and govern resistance-held areas in Sagaing Region. It was approved by the Sagaing Federal Unit's legislature in June 2025 after months of deliberation. Negotiations began in late 2025, to form the SFUIG through "bottom-up democracy" using a selection commission representing seven identified revolutionary subgroups- ousted former parliamentarians, political party members, ethnic minorities, civil servants, protestors, existing local people's administrators and a seventh group of "other participants". NUG Acting President Duwa Lashi La sent a congratulatory message on Dec. 24 to the SFUH for building “a people-centered administrative system” in Sagaing Region.

Formally established in December 2025 and early 2026, the SFUIG was formed to manage the liberated areas within Sagaing Region under an interim constitution during the country's revolutionary transition. It features a legislative body and a Cabinet focused on regional security, defense, and the restoration of public services. The Chief Minister of the SFUIG is Soe Oo.

== Cabinet composition ==
The SFUIG was officially established on December 23, 2025, following approval by the Sagaing Federal Unit Hluttaw (SFUH). It holds the distinction of being the first federal unit government formed during the Spring Revolution. The cabinet is composed of the Chief Minister, eleven ministers, and an Attorney General.

Members of the Sagaing Federal Unit Interim Government
No.	Position	Name
1	Chief Minister	Soe Oo
2	Deputy Chief Minister	Dr. Aung Nay Win
3	Minister of Defense	Ko Ko Aung
4	Minister of Home Affairs	Moe Min Win
5	Minister of Planning and Finance	Khant Wai Phyo
6	Minister of Education	Dr. Tin Aung Moe
7	Minister of Health	Dr. Myint Aung
8	Minister of Humanitarian Affairs, Rehabilitation and Emergency Management	Toe Wai Aung
9	Minister of Electricity, Energy, and Construction	Than Hlaing
10	Minister of Forestry and Natural Resources	Zin Min Tun
11	Minister of Ethnic Affairs	Bwe Hoke Htan
12	Minister of Municipal Affairs	Rati Ohn
13	Attorney General	Aung Chit Nyo

== See also ==
- National Unity Government of Myanmar
- Sagaing Region
- 2021 Myanmar coup d'état
