= Soe Oo =

Burmese Politician and Rebel Leader

- စိုးဦး

Prime Minister of Sagaing Federal Unit Interim Government
- Incumbent
- Assumed office 27 November 2025
- President: Duwa Lashi La; (NUG)

Minister of Planning and Finance for Sagaing Region Government
- In office 5 April 2016 – 1 February 2021
- Leader: Myint Naing

Member of the Sagaing Region Hluttaw
- In office 1 February 2016 – 1 February 2021
- Constituency: Sagaing Township №.1
- Majority: 55205 votes

Personal details
- Born: Sagaing, Myanmar
- Party: National League for Democracy
- Spouse: Hla Hla Win
- Children: 4
- Cabinet: Sagaing Region Government

Soe Oo (Burmese: စိုးဦး) is a Burmese politician and Opposition leader who currently serves as Prime Minister of Sagaing Federal Unit Interim Government which is part of National Unity Government of Myanmar since November 2025. He was also current MP of Sagaing Federal Unit Hluttaw. He was former Minister of Planning and Finance for Sagaing Region and former Sagaing Region Parliament MP for Sagaing Township No.1.

== Political career ==
In the 2015 Myanmar general election, he was elected as a Sagaing Region Hluttaw MP, winning a majority of 55205 votes, from Sagaing Township No. 1 parliamentary constituency. Soe Oo also serving as a member of Sagaing Region Investment Committee and Regional minister of Planning and Finance for Sagaing Region.

== See also ==
- Sagaing Region Government
