= Hmwe Hmwe Khin =

Burmese politician

- မွှေးမွှေးခင်

Minister of Shan Ethnic Affairs for Sagaing Region

Member of the Sagaing Region Hluttaw
- Incumbent
- Assumed office 1 February 2016
- Constituency: Shan
- Majority: 32,958 votes

Personal details
- Born: Homalin, Myanmar
- Party: Tai-Leng Nationalities Development Party
- Cabinet: Sagaing Region Government

Hmwe Hmwe Khin (Burmese: မွှေးမွှေးခင်) is a Burmese politician who currently serves as Minister of Shan Ethnic Affairs for Sagaing Region and Shan State Parliament MP for Shan.

== Political career ==
In the 2015 Myanmar general election, she was elected as a Sagaing Region Hluttaw MP, winning a majority of 32,958 votes, from Shan parliamentary constituency. She also serving as a Regional Minister of Shan Ethnic Affairs for Sagaing Region.
