= Shila Nang Dong =

Burmese politician

Member of the Amyotha Hluttaw
- In office 3 February 2016 – 1 February 2021
- Constituency: Kachin State № 2
- Majority: 49882 votes

Personal details
- Born: 6 October 1954 (age 71) Kutkai, Shan State, Myanmar
- Party: National League for Democracy
- Spouse: Baran Sai
- Children: Naw Jar; Zaw Sam Sai; Lu Lu Htwet
- Parent(s): Khun Oun (father); Nan Mya (mother)
- Education: B.Ed, M.Phil(Eng), M.A (Eng)
- Alma mater: Yangon Institute of Education; Mandalay University

Shila Nang Dong, also known as M Nang Dong (Burmese: ရှီလာနန်တောင်, born 6 October 1954) is a Burmese politician who served as an Amyotha Hluttaw MP for Kachin State No. 2 constituency. She is a member of the National League for Democracy.

== Early life and education ==
Shila Nang Dong was born on 6 October 1954 in Kukai, Shan State, Myanmar. She is an ethnic Kachin and Shan. She graduated with B.Ed. from Yangon Institute of Education in 1977, followed by an M.Phil(Eng) and M.A (Eng) from Mandalay University.

== Political career ==
She is a member of the National League for Democracy. In the 2015 Myanmar general election, she was elected as an Amyotha Hluttaw MP, winning a majority of 49,882 votes and elected representative from the Kachin State No. 2 constituency.
