= Suu Myat Htet =

Burmese politician

Member of the Sagaing Region Hluttaw
- Incumbent
- Assumed office 3 February 2016
- Constituency: Sagaing Township № 2
- Majority: 60,981 votes

Personal details
- Born: 22 July 1980 (age 46) Sagaing, Myanmar
- Party: National League for Democracy
- Spouse: Kyaw Myo Aung
- Children: 3
- Parent: Than Kyaw (father)
- Education: Sagaing Education College; Taungoo Education College; Sagaing Institute of Education; Monywa Institute of Economics; University of Foreign Languages, Mandalay; Mandalay University; Meiktila Institute of Economics

Suu Myat Htet (Burmese: စုမြတ်ထက်, also spelt Su Myat Htet; born 22 July 1980) is a Burmese politician who currently serves as a member of parliament in the Sagaing Region Hluttaw for Sagaing Township № 2 Constituency. She is a member of the National League for Democracy.

== Early life and education ==
Suu Myat Htet was born on 22 July 1980 in Sagaing, Myanmar. She graduated M.Ed, B.Ed, B.A., Dip in Eng, Dip in Political Science, Master of Public Administration, from Sagaing Education College, Taungoo Education College, Sagaing Institute of Education, Monywa Institute of Economics, Meiktila Institute of Economics joint, University of Foreign Languages, Mandalay and Mandalay University. She previously worked as a headmistress of Kid's Smile Private School, Sagaing. She had served as the charge of NLD Township Youth.

== Political career ==
In the 2015 Myanmar general election, she contested the Sagaing Region Hluttaw from Sagaing Township № 2 parliamentary constituency, winning a majority of 60,981 votes. She is currently serves as chairperson in Government guarantees, admission and commitment appraisal committee in the Sagaing Region Hluttaw and as chairwoman of the NLD women’s committee in Sagaing Township.
