= Myint Kyi =

Burmese politician

U Myint Kyi
- မြင့်ကြည်

Ministry of Municipal for Sagaing Region

Member of the Sagaing Region Hluttaw
- Incumbent
- Assumed office 1 February 2016
- Constituency: Pale Township №.2

Personal details
- Born: Pale, Myanmar
- Party: National League for Democracy
- Cabinet: Sagaing Region Government

Myint Kyi (Burmese: မြင့်ကြည်) is a Burmese politician who currently serves as Minister of Municipal for Sagaing Region and MP for Pale Township No.2.

== Political career ==
In the 2015 Myanmar general election, he was elected as a Sagaing Region Hluttaw MP, from Pale Township No.2 parliamentary constituency. He also serving as a Regional Minister of Municipal for Sagaing Region.
