= Kam Za Mon =

Burmese politician

Pu Kam Za Mung
- ကမ်ဇာမုံ
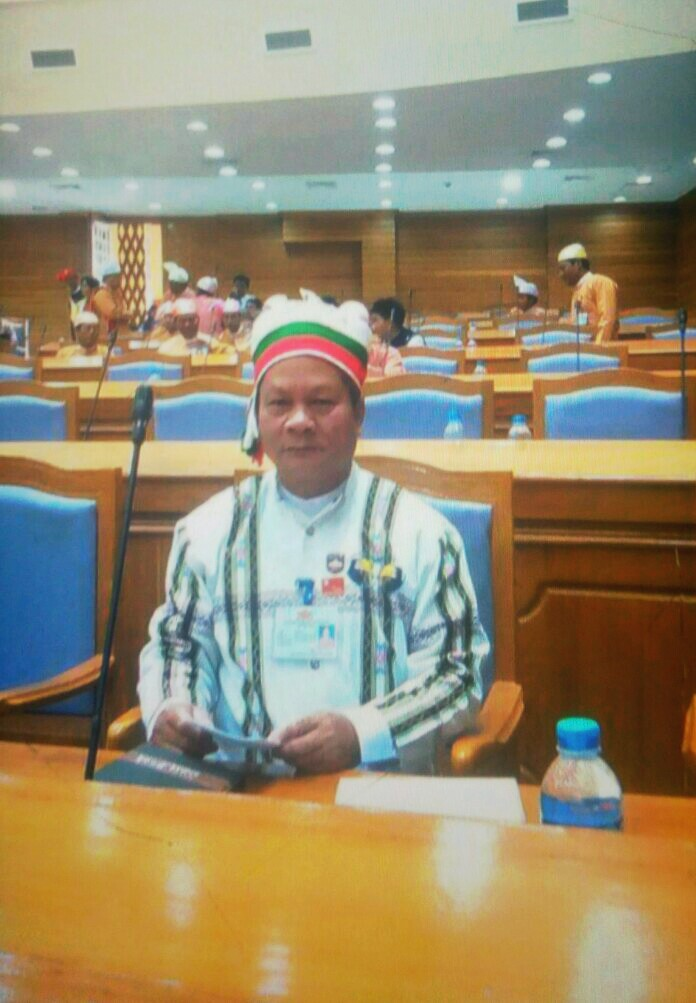

Minister of Agriculture, livestock and Irrigation for Sagaing Region
- Incumbent
- Assumed office 5 April 2016

Member of the Sagaing Region Hluttaw
- Incumbent
- Assumed office 1 February 2016
- Constituency: Kalay Township No..2

Personal details
- Born: Sagaing, Myanmar
- Party: National League for Democracy
- Cabinet: Sagaing Region Government

Kam Za Mung (Burmese: ကမ်ဇာမုံ, also spelt Kan Zar Mon or Kanzar Mone) is a Burmese politician who currently serves as Minister of Agriculture, Livestock and Irrigation for Sagaing Region and MP for Kalay Township No. 2 constituency.

== Political career ==
In the 2015 Myanmar general election, he was elected as a Sagaing Region Hluttaw MP, from Kalay Township No.2 parliamentary constituency. He also serving as a Regional minister of Agriculture, Livestock and Irrigation for Sagaing Region.
