= Aye Myat Mon =

Burmese politician

- အေးမြတ်မွန်

Member of the Sagaing Region Hluttaw
- Incumbent
- Assumed office 3 February 2016
- Constituency: Myaung Township № 1
- Majority: 22,953

Personal details
- Born: 9 February 1981 (age 45) Myaung, Myanmar
- Party: National League for Democracy
- Education: LL.B, LL.M
- Occupation: Politician

Aye Myat Mon (Burmese: အေးမြတ်မွန်) is a Burmese politician who has been the MP of the Sagaing Region Hluttaw for Myaung Township No. 1 constituency since the 2015 general election. She is a member of the National League for Democracy.

== Political career ==
In the 2015 Myanmar general election, she contested the Sagaing Region Hluttaw from Myaung Township No. 1 parliamentary constituency and won a seat.

In the 2020 Myanmar general election, re-elect Sagaing Region Hluttaw MP for Myaung Township No. 1 constituency but was not allowed to assume her seat due to a military coup.
