= Sagaing University of Education =

University in Myanmar

- စစ်ကိုင်း ပညာရေးတက္ကသိုလ်
- Motto: အားလုံးဆောင်ရွက် အားလုံးတွက်တည့် All for All
- Type: public
- Established: 1992; 34 years ago
- Location: Sagaing, Sagaing Region, Myanmar; 21°55′56.0″N 95°58′37.2″E
- Website: http://suoe.moe.edu.mm

The Sagaing University of Education (Burmese: စစ်ကိုင်း ပညာရေးတက္ကသိုလ် [zəɡáɪɰ̃ pjɪ̀ɰ̃ɲàjé tɛʔkəθò]), formerly known as Mandalay Institute of Education or Sagaing Institute of Education located in Sagaing, Sagaing Region, is one of two senior universities of education in Myanmar. Having primarily begun as a teacher training college in Mandalay, the university currently offers Bachelor of Education, Master of Education, MPhil, Doctor of Philosophy and Post Graduate Diploma in Multimedia Arts (PGDMA) degree programs in education to prospective primary and secondary school teachers.

In addition, senior lecturers of Sagaing University of Education (SUOE) provide short-term pedagogical training - primarily focusing on educational assessment, management and administration courses - to the in-service educators from various universities and public schools under the Ministry of Education of Myanmar.

== Affiliated universities and colleges ==
Along with the Yangon Institute of Education, the Sagaing Institute of Education is affiliated with 22 educational colleges located throughout the country.

- Bogalay Education College
- Dawei Education College
- Hlegu Education College
- Hpa-An Education College
- Kyaukphyu Education College
- Lashio Education College
- Loikaw Education College
- Magway Education College
- Mandalay Education College
- Mawlamyaing Education College
- Monywa Education College
- Meiktila Education College
- Myaungmya Education College
- Myitkyina Education College
- Pakokku Education College
- Pathein Education College
- Pyay Education College
- Sagaing Education College
- Taungoo Education College
- Taunggyi Education College
- Thingangyun Education College
- Yankin Education College
