= Soe Lwin =

Burmese politician

- စိုးလွင်

Regional Auditor
- Incumbent
- Assumed office 7 April 2016
- President: Htin Kyaw

Personal details
- Born: Myanmar

Soe Lwin (Burmese: စိုးလွင်) is the incumbent Regional Auditor of Sagaing, Myanmar (Burma). He is a member of Sagaing Region Government.

He serving as a Regional Auditor of Sagaing Region.
