= Khin Myo Chit (politician) =

Burmese politician

Member of the Sagaing Region Hluttaw
- Incumbent
- Assumed office 3 February 2016
- Constituency: Kanbalu № 1
- Majority: 36,864 votes

Personal details
- Born: Kanbalu, Myanmar
- Party: National League for Democracy

Khin Myo Chit (Burmese: ခင်မျိုးချစ်) is a Burmese politician who currently serves as a Sagaing Region Hluttaw member of parliament for Kanbalu Township No. 1 Constituency.

She is a member of the National League for Democracy.

== Political career ==
In the Myanmar general election, 2015, she was elected as a Sagaing Region Hluttaw MP, winning a majority of 36,864 votes and elected representative from Kanbalu Township No. 1 parliamentary constituency.

She is currently serves as secretary in Government guarantees, admission and commitment appraisal committee in the Sagaing Region Hluttaw.
