= Myint Naing =

Burmese politician and political prisoner

His Excellency Dr Myint Naing
- မြင့်နိုင်

2nd Chief Minister of Sagaing Region
- In office 30 March 2016 – 1 February 2021
- Appointed by: President of Myanmar
- President: Htin Kyaw
- Preceded by: Tha Aye

Member of the Sagaing Region Hluttaw
- In office 8 February 2016 – 31 January 2021
- Constituency: Shwebo Township № 1

Member of the Amyotha Hluttaw
- In office 2 May 2012 – 29 January 2016
- Preceded by: Win Myint
- Succeeded by: Win Aung
- Constituency: Sagaing Region № 3

Member-elect of the Pyithu Hluttaw
- Preceded by: Constituency established
- Succeeded by: Constituency abolished
- Constituency: Kantbalu № 2
- Majority: 30,628 (76%)

Personal details
- Born: 6 October 1951 (age 74) Shwebo, Burma
- Party: National League for Democracy
- Relations: Zaw (father); Aye Yin (mother)
- Education: Mandalay Institute of Medicine
- Occupation: Politician

Myint Naing (Burmese: မြင့်နိုင်) is a Burmese politician and former political prisoner who served as Chief Minister of Sagaing Region until the 2021 Myanmar coup d'état. He previously served as an Amyotha Hluttaw member of parliament for Sagaing Region Constituency No. 3. In the 1990 Burmese general election, he was elected as an Pyithu Hluttaw MP, winning a majority of 30,628 (76% of the votes), but was never allowed to assume his seat.

== Early life and education ==
Myint Naing graduated with a medical degree (MBBS) from the Mandalay Institute of Medicine in 1981.

== Political career ==
He was arrested in September 1990 and sentenced to 25 years under the Burmese Penal Code's Article 122. He actively took part together with his colleagues in the famous Saffron Revolution.

He was elected as member of House of Nationalities in the 2012 Myanmar by-elections. In the 2015 general election, Myint Naing ran for Sagaing Region Hluttaw and was re-elected. In 2016, he was appointed as Chief Minister of Sagaing Region by the President of Myanmar with the recommendation of Sagaing Region Hluttaw.

In the wake of the 2021 Myanmar coup d'état on 1 February, Myint Maung was detained by the Myanmar Armed Forces.
