= Khin Maung Hla =

Burmese politician

- ခင်ေမာင်လ

Advocate General of Sagaing Region
- President: Htin Kyaw

Personal details
- Born: Myanmar
- Occupation: Attorney

Khin Maung Hla (Burmese: ခင်ေမာင်လ) is the incumbent Advocate General of Sagaing Region, Myanmar (Burma). He is a member of Sagaing Region Government.

He serving as a Regional Advocate General of Sagaing Region.

== See also ==
- Sagaing Region Government
