= Ampun Bang Jago =

2016 single by Tian Storm and Everslkr

- Thumbnail for the music video

Single by Jonathan Dorongpangalo and Everly Salikara
- Language: Indonesian; Manado Malay
- English title: Beg You Mercy, Champ
- Published: Delapan Belas Musik
- Released: 2016/2017
- Genre: Electronic dance music
- Length: 3:33
- Producer: Kevin Rater

Music video
- "Ampun Bang Jago" on YouTube

"Ampun Bang Jago 2"

Single by Jonathan Dorongpangalo and Everly Salikara
- Language: Indonesian, Manado Malay
- Published: 4 February 2021
- Genre: Remix
- Length: 3:15
- Label: Delapan Belas Musik

Lyrics video
- "Ampun Bang Jago 2" on YouTube

"Ampun Bang Jago" (transl. "Beg You Mercy, Champ") is an electronic dance music (EDM) single by Indonesian musicians Jonathan Dorongpangalo and Everly Salikara, known by their stage names as Tian Storm and Everslkr, respectively. It was not initially created as an EDM track, but the rising trend in Indonesia caused them to convert the song into one. The song became viral, becoming a frequently used song on TikTok, and received international popularity. The unprecedented legacy prompted the duo to create a remix, "Ampun Bang Jago 2".

== Background and lyrics ==
Jonathan Dorongpangalo and Everly Salikara, known by their stage names as Tian Storm and Everslkr, respectively, are musicians from Bitung, a city in North Sulawesi. Dorongpangalo conceived the idea for "Ampun Bang Jago" as political satire that pokes fun at the Indonesian authorities, concerning the power struggle between the people and them, "because my life motto is concede to win." The song is made under the name of musical collective Bassgilano, with whom the duo joined in 2016.

The first draft of "Ampun Bang Jago" was not EDM, but a set of sentences as a way for Dorongpangalo and Salikara to vent their feelings on people underestimating them. After being belittled by fellow musicians due to fierce rivalry, they converted the draft into EDM, a genre that aligns with Indonesia's rising musical trend.

== Music video ==
The music video for "Ampun Bang Jago," uploaded on YouTube on 12 September 2020, is set in an abandoned field and a bus terminal. Endrico Geraldo serves as the director, cinematographer, and editor, while Piaw is the choreographer. Equipment was borrowed from TSstudio. In addition to the duo, the video features Piaw, Egha, Gita, Nando Kohler, Marsel Kasengke, Doddi Metuak, and Silvester Masihor. Additional credits go to Christian Sarante, Josia Walone, and Andhika Makawekes. The plot centers around several troubled individuals who are fighting and chasing each other, intercut with a montage of three girls dancing. Soon, one of the men is threatened with being shot. His team attempts to block their adversary from attacking him but fails, resulting in the man being shot.

The lyrics video for "Ampun Bang Jago 2" premiered on YouTube on 4 February 2021. It features Dorongpangalo and Salikara, wearing masks, DJ-ing at the rooftop of a pink-coloured metropolitan building. The music video for "Ampun Bang Jago 2" is set to be released sometime in the future. The music video, specifically, is a partnership with the Bitung Police, as well as Bitung content creator Indra Dunggio, known by his pseudonym as Preman Pinokalan ("Pinokalan Thug").

== Reception ==
=== Popularity on TikTok ===
The song became viral and became a signature song in the duo's village's "Disko Tanah" community. Not long later, the song became an available track for TikTok users to use on their videos. "Ampun Bang Jago" is their second viral song that is also used on TikTok, after "Anjing Kacili" ('Little Dog'), although Dorongpangalo did not expect the hype. It was also used by protesters during the Indonesia omnibus law protests. In addition, the song gifted Dorongpangalo and Salikara a partnership with a "famous" record label in 2017. As of "Ampun Bang Jago", the duo had created 60 songs, divided into five albums. Acknowledging the existence, YouTube Rewind Indonesia 2020 also partially used the song.

The song also received international popularity. On 8 October 2020, the TikTok account of football club West Ham United F.C. made a video using the song. As of 13 October 2020, it garnered 1.2 million views and 110.1 thousand likes, making it the most-viewed video from the account.

=== Video during the Myanmar coup d'état ===
The song received global attention after 26-year-old exercise instructor Khing Hnin Wai filmed an aerobics video in the capital Naypyidaw, amid the 2021 Myanmar coup d'état. A convoy of heavily armed military vehicles are seen in the background approaching the nation’s parliament while the song reaches its climax. The video was described by NPR as surreal. Posted on her Facebook, the video became viral and was met with mixed opinions: while its symbolism was lauded, Myanmar military supporters thought of the video as an insult. It has been widely used on Reddit, with Hnin Wai being photoshopped to photos of various historical events.

Responding to the video, Dorongpangalo hoped that "Ampun Bang Jago" proves to international audiences that Indonesian songs—particularly those from eastern Indonesia—can be enjoyable too, and for Indonesian singers to continue their works "to enliven the homeland's musical reputation."

=== Remix ===
"Ampun Bang Jago
Tapi bo'ong
Si kecil mulai aktif"

— Changes of lyrics on the remix version features a plot twist, featuring a reference to an Internet meme originating from a milk advertisement

Due to the song's popularity, upon requests from fans, and under the will to collaborate with fellow Bitung content creators, the duo announced a sequel single, "Ampun Bang Jago 2". The remix features a different audio mixing style; for example, the sound drop at the start of the song are replaced by sirens. Because of the easiness, it was made within three days. There are also changes to the lyrics, with a plot twist at the end, saying "Tapi bo'ong", meaning "It's a lie". Dorongpangalo stated that the sequel is merely "for fun" and does not have as many sarcastic elements as its predecessor.
