= Yangon University of Education =

University in Myanmar

Coordinates: 16°49′00.1″N 96°08′04.1″E

- ရန်ကုန် ပညာရေး တက္ကသိုလ်
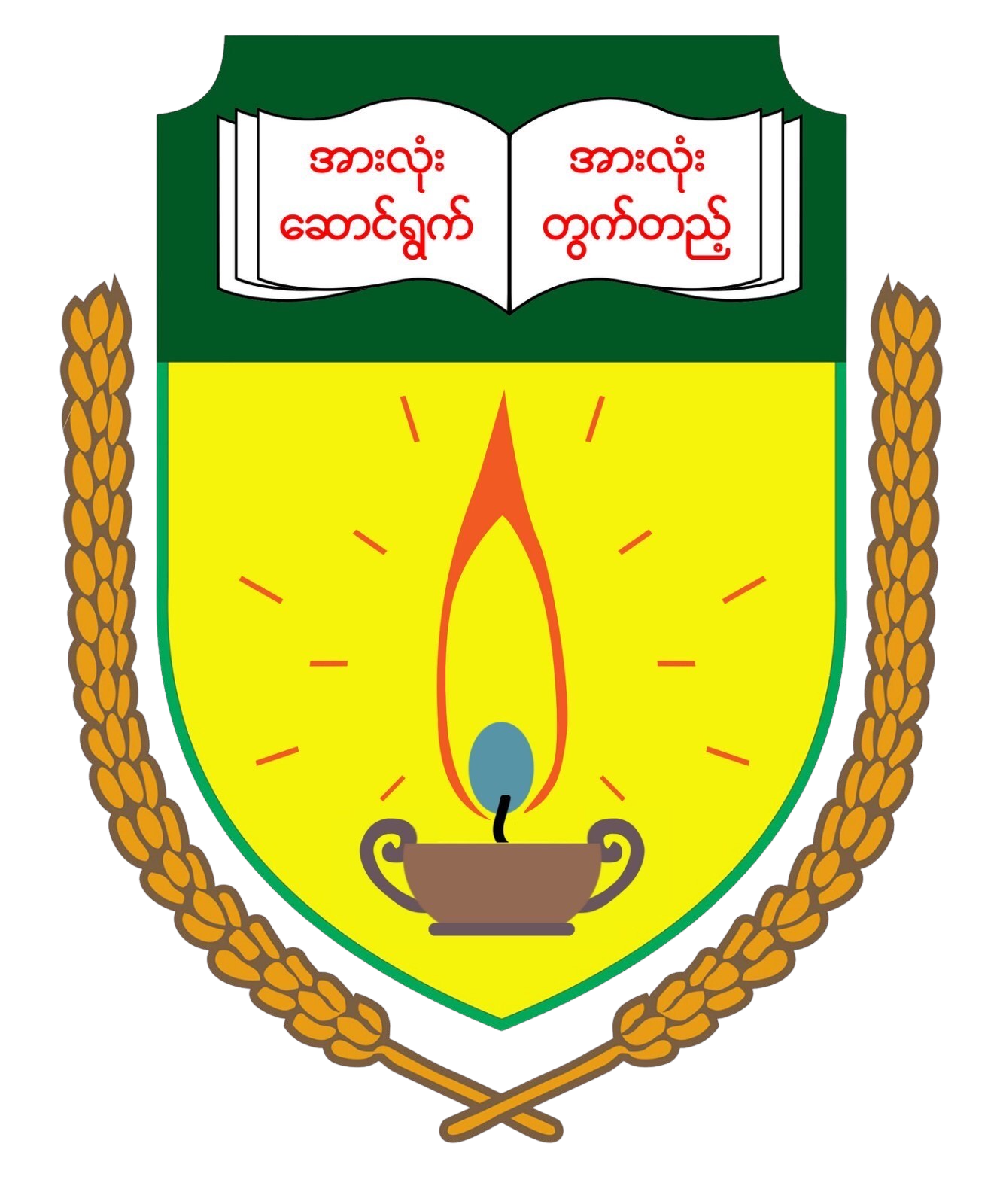
- YUOE Emblem
- Motto: အားလုံးဆောင်ရွက်၊ အားလုံးတွက်တည့် pronounced [ʔá lóʊɴ sʰàʊɰ̃ jwɛʔ ʔá lóʊɴ twɛʔ tḭ]
- Motto in English: All for All
- Type: Public
- Established: 1931; 95 years ago
- Affiliations: Ministry of Education
- Rector: Dr Kay Thwe Hlaing
- Students: 27,000
- Undergraduates: 2,000
- Postgraduates: 23,000
- Location: Kamayut 11041, Yangon, Myanmar
- Website: yuoe.edu.mm

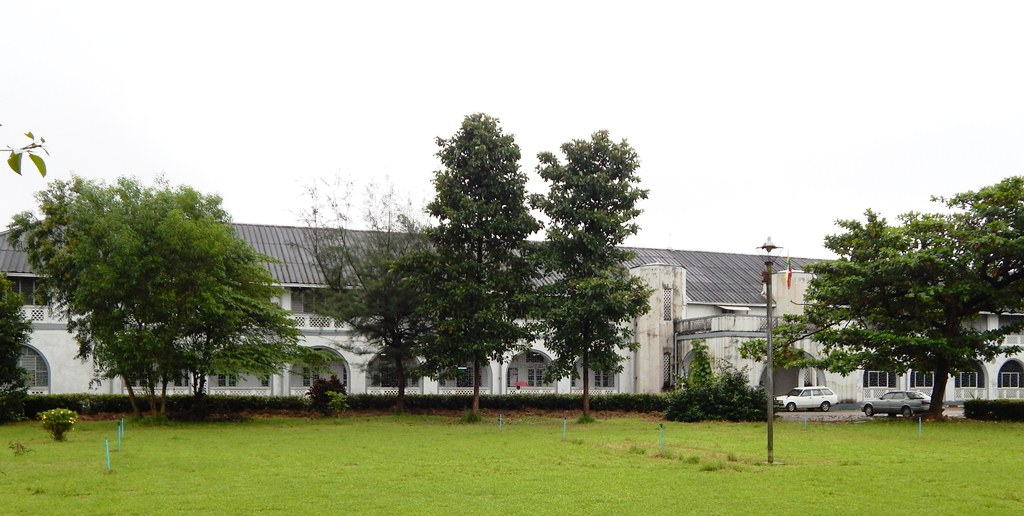
Yangon Institute of Education

The Yangon University of Education (formerly the Yangon Institute of Education; Burmese: ရန်ကုန် ပညာရေး တက္ကသိုလ် [jàɰ̃ɡòʊɰ̃ pjɪ̀ɰ̃ɲàjé tɛʔkəθò]; abbreviated YUOE), located in Kamayut, Yangon, is the premier university of education in Myanmar. Primarily a teacher training college, it offers bachelor's, master's and doctoral degree programs in education to the country's prospective primary, secondary and tertiary school teachers. Its training high school known as TTC is considered one of the best high schools in the country.

== History ==
The institute began as the Department of Education under Rangoon University (Yangon University) in 1924, and in 1931 became a separate college, still under Rangoon University as the Teacher's Training College (TTC). It became an independent institute in 1964. Until very recently, all educational colleges throughout the country were supervised by the Yangon University of Education.

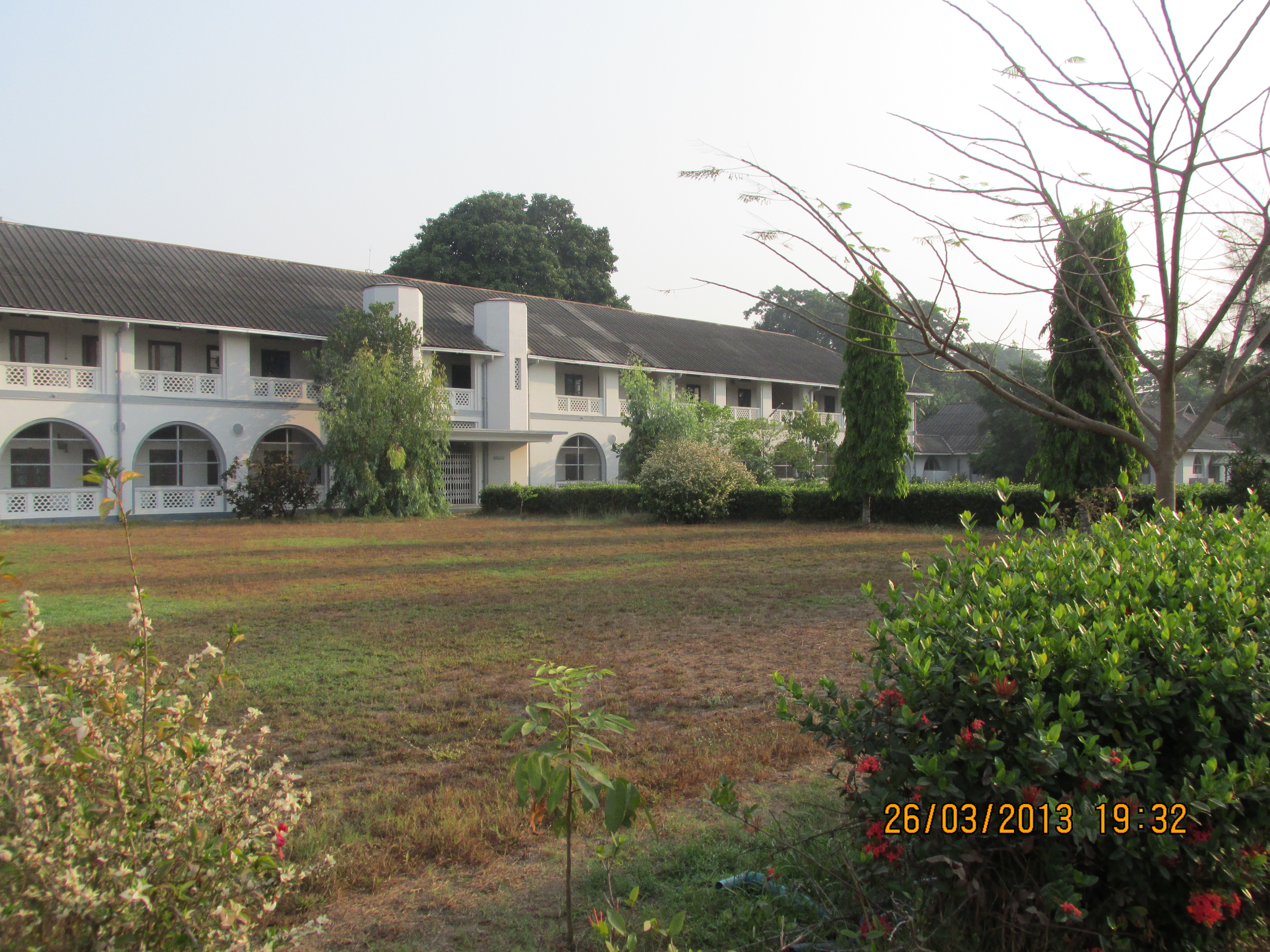

== Affiliated universities and colleges ==
Along with the Sagaing Institute of Education, the Yangon University of Education is affiliated with 22 educational colleges located throughout the country.

- Bogalay Education College
- Dawei Education College
- Hlegu Education College
- Hpa-An Education College
- Kyaukphyu Education College
- Lashio Education College
- Loikaw Education College
- Magway Education College
- Mandalay Education College
- Mawlamyaing Education College
- Monywa Education College
- Meiktila Education College
- Myaungmya Education College
- Myitkyina Education College
- Pakokku Education College
- Pathein Education College
- Pyay Education College
- Sagaing Education College
- Taungoo Education College
- Taunggyi Education College
- Thingangyun Education College
- Yankin Education College

== Departments ==
The departments can be grouped into three categories: Education departments, Academic Departments, and Administration departments.

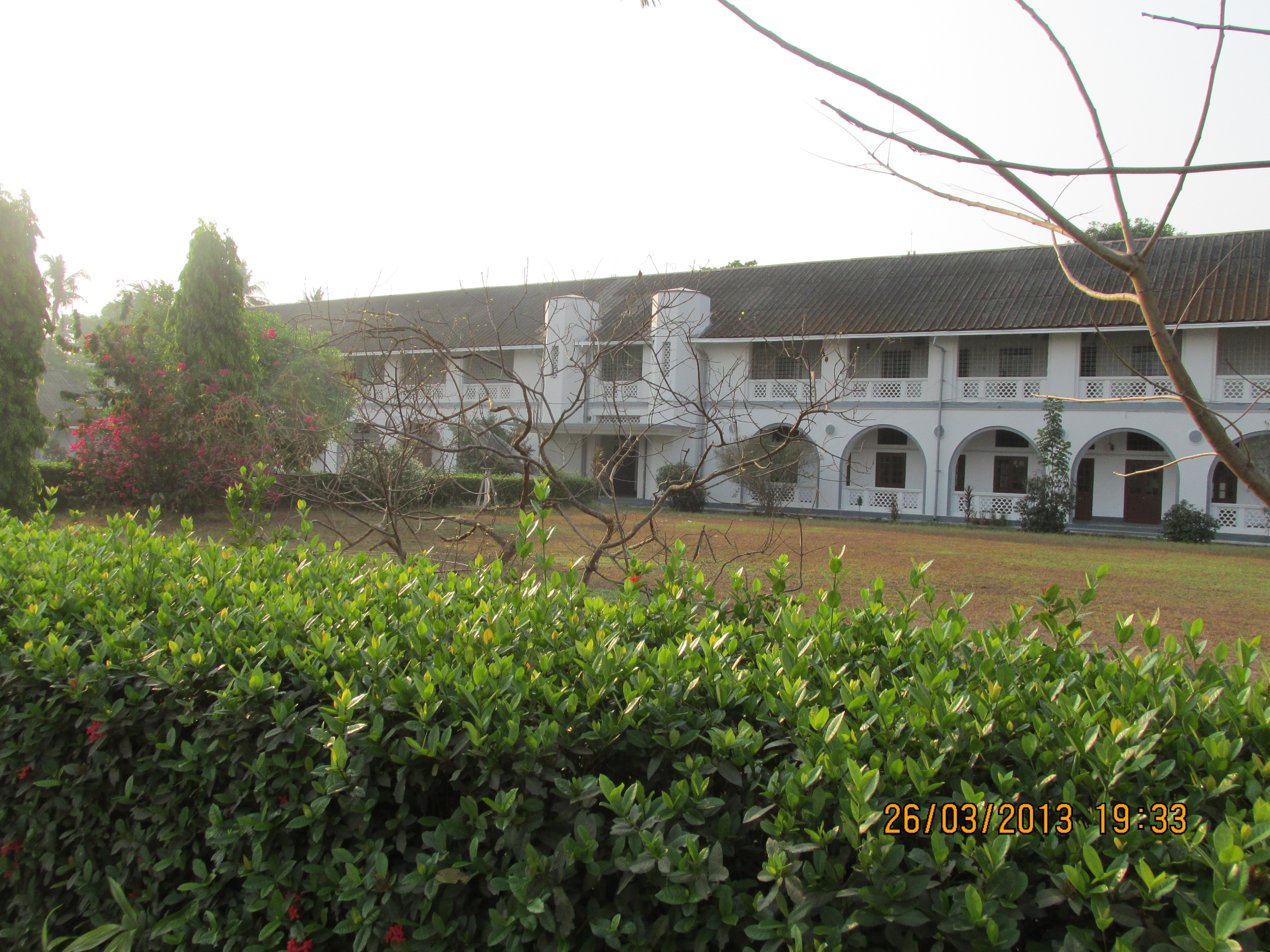

Education departments include:

- Department of Educational Theory and Management
- Department of Educational Psychology
- Curriculum and Methodology Department
- Department of Physical Education and School Health

Academic Departments include:

- Myanmar Department
- English Department
- Mathematics Department
- Chemistry Department
- Physics Department
- Biology Department
- Geography Department
- History Department
- Economics Department
