= Tayzar San =

Burmese physician and activist

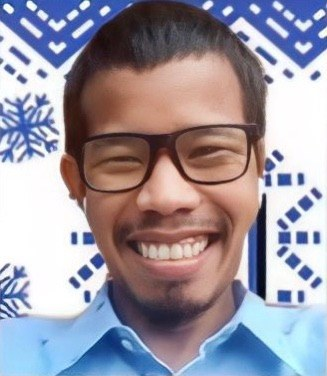
Tayzar San in 2021 at a VOA interview

Tayzar San (Burmese: တေဇာဆန်း; born 1989) is a Burmese physician, politician and pro-democracy activist. He is a leading figure in the Spring Revolution in Myanmar. San served as chairman of the Mandalay District All Burma Federation of Student Unions.

== Career ==
A physician by training, San attended University of Medicine Mandalay. After graduation, he worked as a librarian and NGO worker with a focus on public health and political education. In 2010, he founded the Beautiful Mind Foundation, which provides free health care services to the poor. He became the executive director of the Yone Kyi Yar Knowledge Propagation Society, a local research and parliamentary monitoring group.

== Political career ==
A few days after the 2021 Myanmar coup d'état, while other activists in the country were still deliberating, he organized the first ever protest against the junta. Following that first protest in Mandalay, anti-regime rallies blossomed across the country.

On 19 April 2021, authorities issued an arrest warrant and charged San with defamation of the state under section 505 (a) of the penal code. They announced a 10 million kyat (U.S. $7,000) reward for information leading to his arrest.

On 10 June 2021, he received the Park Jong-cheol Human Rights Award.

He is also a member of Anti-junta Forces Coordination Committee-Mandalay that is a member organization of NUCC.
