= Ayadaw Township =

- Township
- Location in Myanmar
- Coordinates: 22°17′N 95°27′E
- Country: Myanmar
- Region: Sagaing Region
- District: Monywa District
- Capital: Ayadaw
- Time zone: UTC+6.30 (MST)

Ayadaw Township is a township in Monywa District in the Sagaing Division of Myanmar. The principal town is Ayadaw.
