= Ayadaw =

Ayadaw အရာတော်မြို့
- Town
- Location in Myanmar
- Coordinates: 21.217°N 95.467°E
- Country: Myanmar
- Admin. region: Sagaing
- District: Monywa
- Township: Ayadaw Township
- Time zone: UTC+6:30 (MST)

Ayadaw is a town and seat of Ayadaw Township in the Sagaing Division in Myanmar. Due to the presence of thanakha plantations in the area, the town is dubbed the "thanakha capital" of Myanmar.
