= Yankin Education College =

Educational college

Coordinates: 16°50′11.8″N 96°09′43.6″E

Yankin Education College (in Burmese; ရန်ကင်းပညာရေးကောလိပ်) is an educational college located in Yankin Township, Kanbe', Yangon Region, Burma. It teaches basic and essential role of teacher for two years which produces primary & secondary teachers yearly. In 2003, it launched a new training program for fresh graduate called COBOL.

First established as STCT on 1 August 1947 (79 years ago)

Upgraded to EC on 27 November 1998 (27 years ago)

Location - No.4, Thitsar Road, 11ward, Yankin Township

Campus area - 15.308 acres (6.195 ha)
