= 2021 Myanmar coup d'état =

2021 military coup in Myanmar

- Part of the Myanmar conflict and the prelude to the Myanmar civil war (2021–present)
- Footage of military vehicles arriving at the Pyidaungsu Hluttaw in Naypyidaw during the coup d'état.
Date	1 February 2021; 5 years ago
Location	Naypyidaw, Myanmar
Result	Coup d'état successful; End of civilian rule and reimposition of military rule; Aung San Suu Kyi and Win Myint detained and deposed; Min Aung Hlaing seizes emergency power and appoints himself Chairman of the State Administration Council (Note: Min Aung Hlaing directly appointed the State Administration Council through CinCDS order No (9/2021), using his emergency powers as Commander-in-Chief after they were activated by the new National Defence and Security Council that he formed through the coup.); Myint Swe installed by military as Acting President of Myanmar; Twenty-four ministers and deputies deposed; Results of the 2020 general election annulled, new election called; Assembly of the Union dissolved; State of emergency declared for a period of one year (later extended to four years and six months); New cabinet formed; New governing body, the State Administration Council, established; Start of mass protests and a civil war

Belligerents
Government of Myanmar; National League for Democracy	Tatmadaw; Union Solidarity and Development Party

Commanders and leaders
Aung San Suu Kyi (State Counsellor of Myanmar); Win Myint (President of Myanmar)	Min Aung Hlaing (Commander-in-Chief of Defence Services); Myint Swe (Vice-President of Myanmar)

A coup d'état in Myanmar began on the morning of 1 February 2021, when democratically elected members of the country's ruling party, the National League for Democracy (NLD), were deposed by the Tatmadaw, Myanmar's military, which then vested power in a military junta. Acting President of Myanmar Myint Swe proclaimed a year-long state of emergency and declared power had been transferred to Commander-in-Chief of Defence Services Senior General Min Aung Hlaing. It declared the results of the November 2020 general election invalid and stated its intent to hold a new election at the end of the state of emergency. The coup d'état occurred the day before the Parliament of Myanmar was to swear in the members elected in the 2020 election, thereby preventing this from occurring.

President Win Myint and State Counsellor Aung San Suu Kyi were detained, along with ministers, their deputies, and members of Parliament. On 1 February 2021, Win Myint and Aung San Suu Kyi were arrested on charges that independent analysts regarded as part of an attempt to legitimize the military's seizure of power. Both were remanded in custody for two weeks. Between 16 February and 1 April, five additional charges were leveled against Aung San Suu Kyi.

Armed insurgencies by the People's Defence Force of the National Unity Government erupted throughout Myanmar in response to the military government's crackdown on anti-coup protests, leading to a multi-sided civil war still ongoing as of 2026.

As of 13 March 2024, at least 50,000 people, including at least 8,000 civilians (570 of whom were children), have been killed by the junta forces and 26,234 individuals have been arrested. In March 2021, three prominent members of the National League for Democracy (NLD) died in police custody, and in July 2022, the junta executed four pro-democracy activists.

In honour of the anniversary for Myanmar's 76th year of independence in January 2024, more than 9,000 prisoners are slated to receive amnesty, leading to their release from prison.

In February 2024, it was announced that compulsory military service would be implemented. All men aged 18 to 35 and women aged 18 to 27 were required to serve up to two years under military command and specialists such as doctors aged up to 45 were to serve for three years.

== Background ==
The National League for Democracy won a landslide victory in the 2020 Myanmar general election.

Myanmar, also known as Burma, has been beset with political instability since it was granted independence from the United Kingdom in January 1948. Between 1958 and 1960, the military formed a temporary caretaker government at the behest of U Nu, the country's democratically elected prime minister, to resolve political infighting. The military voluntarily restored civilian government after holding the 1960 Burmese general election. Less than two years later, the military seized power in the 1962 coup, which under the leadership of General Ne Win, precipitated 26 years of military rule.

In 1988, nationwide protests broke out in the country. Dubbed the 8888 Uprising, the civil unrest was sparked by economic mismanagement, leading Ne Win to step down. In September 1988, the military's top leaders formed the State Law and Order Restoration Council (SLORC), which then seized power. Aung San Suu Kyi, the daughter of General Aung San, the country's founder, became a notable pro-democracy activist during this period. In 1990, free elections were allowed by the military, under the assumption that the military enjoyed popular support. Ultimately, the elections resulted in a landslide victory for Aung San Suu Kyi's party, the National League for Democracy (NLD). However, the military refused to cede power and placed her under house arrest.

The military remained in power for another 22 years until 2011, following the military's roadmap to democracy, during which the 2008 Constitution of Myanmar was drafted. Between 2011 and 2015, a tentative democratic transition began, and elections held in 2015 resulted in a victory for Aung San Suu Kyi's party, the National League for Democracy (NLD). However, the military retained substantial power, including the right to appoint 1/4 of all parliament members.

The 2021 coup occurred in the aftermath of the general election on 8 November 2020, in which the NLD won 396 out of 476 seats in parliament, an even larger margin of victory than in the 2015 election. The military's proxy party, the Union Solidarity and Development Party, won only 33 seats.

The army disputed the results, claiming that the vote was fraudulent. The coup attempt had been rumoured for several days, prompting statements of concern from Western nations such as the United Kingdom, France, the United States, and Australia.

== Coup ==
=== February ===
On 1 February 2021, NLD spokesman Myo Nyunt said that Aung San Suu Kyi, Win Myint, Han Tha Myint, and other party leaders had been "taken" in an early morning raid. Myo Nyunt added that he expected to be also detained shortly. Numerous communications channels stopped working – phone lines to the capital, Naypyidaw, were interrupted, state-run MRTV said it was unable to broadcast due to "technical issues", and widespread Internet disruptions were reported beginning around 3 a.m. The military disrupted cellular services throughout the country, mirroring "kill switch" tactics previously employed in combat zones in Chin and Rakhine states. All the member banks under the Myanmar Banking Association suspended their financial services.

Around 400 elected members of parliament (MPs) were placed under house arrest, confined to a government housing complex in Naypyidaw. Following the coup, the NLD arranged for the MPs to remain housed in the complex until 6 February. Social media users began calling on MPs to convene a parliamentary session within a government guesthouse, since the group met the Constitution's quorum requirements. In response, the military issued another order giving MPs 24 hours to leave the guesthouse premises. On 4 February 70 NLD MPs took an oath of office, in clear defiance of the coup.

During the coup, soldiers also detained several Buddhist monks who had led the 2007 Saffron Revolution, including the Myawaddy Sayadaw and Shwe Nyar War Sayadaw, outspoken critics of the military. 8888 Uprising activist leaders, including Mya Aye, were also arrested. As of 4 February, the Assistance Association for Political Prisoners had identified 133 officials and lawmakers and 14 civil society activists in detention by the military as a result of the coup.

Soldiers were seen in Naypyidaw and the largest city, Yangon. The military subsequently announced on military-controlled Myawaddy TV that it had taken control of the country for one year. A statement signed by Acting President Myint Swe declared that responsibility for "legislation, administration and judiciary" had been transferred to Min Aung Hlaing. The National Defence and Security Council – chaired by acting president Myint Swe and attended by top military officers – was convened, following which a statement was issued by the military declaring that fresh elections would be held, and that power would only be transferred after they had concluded. The military also announced the removal of 24 ministers and deputies, for whom 11 replacements were named.

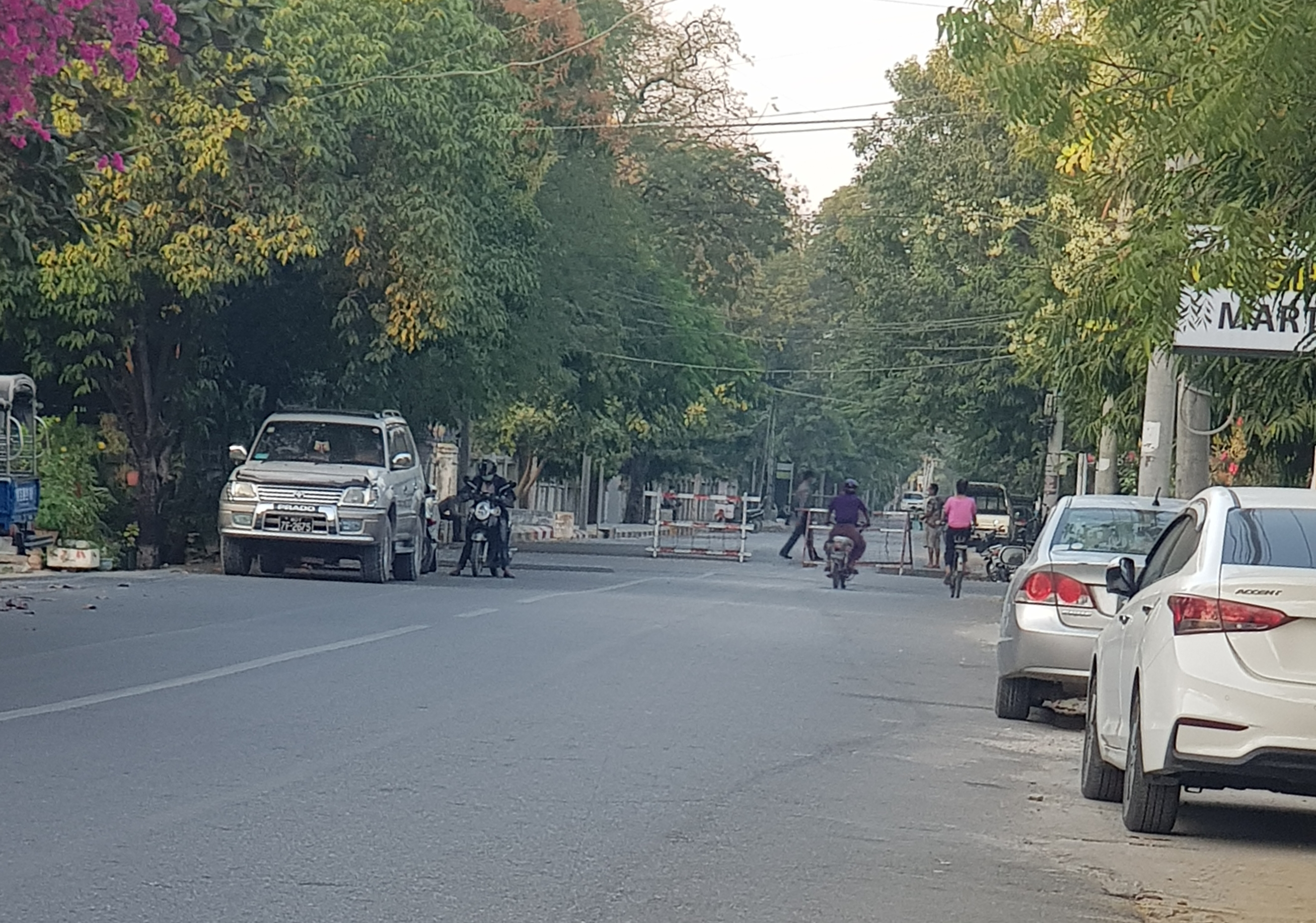
A military blockade of the road leading to the Mandalay Region Government Office.

On 2 February 2021, Min Aung Hlaing established the State Administration Council, with 11 members, as the executive governing body.

On 3 February 2021, Myanmar police filed criminal charges against Aung San Suu Kyi, accusing her of violating the Export and Import Law, for allegedly importing unlicensed communications devices used by her security detail, after conducting a raid on her home in the capital. The Export and Import Law carries a potential prison term of 3 years and/or a fine, and was previously used in 2017 to prosecute journalists for flying a drone above the Assembly of the Union. Meanwhile, Win Myint was charged with violating the Natural Disaster Management Law, specifically for waving at a passing NLD convoy in September 2020, thereby violating rules against election campaigning during the COVID-19 pandemic.

On 6 February 2021, Sean Turnell, the Australian economic advisor to the civilian government, was arrested.

On 8 February 2021 and 9 February 2021, the military government issued orders to impose curfew from 8:00 pm to 4:00 am in Yangon and other major cities and restrict gatherings of 5 or more people in the public spaces.

On 9 February 2021, the NLD's headquarters in Yangon was raided by Myanmar police. Myanmar's military regime distributed a draft for the controversial Cyber Security Law to internet service providers, asking them to provide comments by 15 February 2021. The law was widely criticised by IT communities as it violates human rights by putting citizens under digital surveillance and severely restricting freedom of speech. News of China's involvement in building the firewall were widely circulated among Myanmar social media users, which prompts protestors to demonstrate outside the Chinese Embassy. China denied the news as rumours.

On 10 February 2021, civil servants at Kayah State protested against the coup, which also included police officers stationed there when they refused orders from their superior to return to work.

On 12 February 2021, at midnight, members of Myanmar's military and police arrested government ministers, election officials, senior members of the NLD, activists, and a former general.

On 13 February 2021, a viral post online showed that the military-run Ministry of Information (MOI) pressured the press not to use the words "junta" and "regime" in the media in the military's first attempt to restrict the freedom-of-press. The military regime issued an arrest warrant for seven well-known activists and influencers including Min Ko Naing for "using their fame to spread writing and speaking on the social media that would disturb the nation's peace process".

On 15 February 2021, the military deployed armoured vehicles across the cities, in an attempt to silence the demonstrations in the country. Thousands of protestors in different cities across Myanmar had been calling for the release of Aung San Suu Kyi. On 16 February, as protests continued, Aung San Suu Kyi was given a new criminal charge on allegations of violating the country's National Disaster Law.

On 17 February 2021, the military issued arrest warrants on six more celebrities for urging civil servants to join the civil disobedience movement.

On 26 February 2021, the Myanmar ambassador to the United Nations, Kyaw Moe Tun, condemned the coup by the Tatmadaw. He was sacked from his post the next day. On the same day, a Japanese freelance journalist named Yuki Kitazumi was detained by Myanmar officers at the Sanchaung township police station, but he was released hours later after Kitazumi explained that he clearly identified himself as a reporter.

=== Later developments ===
On 8 March 2021, state-controlled channel MRTV announced that the Ministry of Information revoked the licences for five local media outlets: Mizzima, Myanmar Now, DVB, 7 Day News, and Khit Thit Media. The announcement stated that the outlets were prohibited from publishing and broadcasting in any type of media and by using any sort of technology.

On 9 March 2021, Kyaw Zwar Minn, the Burmese ambassador to the United Kingdom, was recalled after he called for release of Aung San Suu Kyi.

On 18 October 2021, Min Aung Hlaing announced the release of 5,636 prisoners jailed for protesting against the coup. According to the Assistance Association for Political Prisoners, more than 7,300 protesters remained imprisoned across the country following the announcement.

On 10 January 2022, Aung San Suu Kyi was convicted and sentenced to four years in prison for possessing walkie-talkies in her home and for violating COVID-19 protocols.

On 1 August 2022, Myanmar junta's extended the state of emergency for another six months, after the leader Min Aung Hlaing's request to "serve for an additional 6 months". The decision was unanimously taken by the junta's National Defence and Security Council.

Armed insurgencies by the People's Defence Force of the National Unity Government have erupted throughout Myanmar in response to the military government's crackdown on anti-coup protests.

On 17 April 2026, President Win Myint was released after being granted amnesty during the Myanmar New Year’s Day.

== Motives ==
The military's motives for the coup remain unclear. Ostensibly, the military has posited that alleged voter fraud threatened national sovereignty. A few days before the coup, the civilian-appointed Union Election Commission had categorically rejected the military's claims of voter fraud, citing the lack of evidence to support the military's claims of 8.6 million irregularities in voter lists across Myanmar's 314 townships.

The coup may have been driven by the military's goal to preserve its central role in Burmese politics. The Defence Services Act imposes a mandatory retirement age of 65 for the Armed Forces' Commander-in-Chief. Min Aung Hlaing, the incumbent, would have been forced to retire on his 65th birthday in July 2021. Further, the Constitution empowers solely the President, in consultation with the National Defence and Security Council, with the authority to appoint Min Aung Hlaing's successor, which could have provided an opportunity for the civilian arm of the government to appoint a more reform-minded military officer as Commander-in-Chief. Hlaing's lack of power would have exposed him to potential prosecution and accountability for alleged war crimes during the Rohingya conflict in various international courts. Min Aung Hlaing had also hinted a potential entry into politics as a civilian, after his retirement.

The activist group Justice for Myanmar has also noted the significant financial and business interests of Min Aung Hlaing and his family as a potential motivating factor for the coup. Min Aung Hlaing oversees two military conglomerates, the Myanmar Economic Corporation (MEC) and Myanma Economic Holdings Limited (MEHL), while his daughter, son, and daughter-in-law have substantial business holdings in the country.

=== IMF aid ===
A few days before the coup, the International Monetary Fund (IMF) had released US$372 million in cash loans to the Central Bank of Myanmar, as part of an emergency aid package, to help address the COVID-19 pandemic. The funds came with no conditions, and without any precedent for refunds. In response to potential concerns regarding proper use of the funds by the military regime, an IMF spokesperson stated "It would be in the interests of the government, and certainly the people of Myanmar that those funds are indeed used accordingly." The IMF did not directly address any concerns regarding the independence of the Central Bank, given the military's appointment of Than Nyein, an ally, as governor. On 16 September, the IMF acknowledged it was unable to ascertain whether the military regime was using the funds as intended (i.e., "to tackle COVID and support the most vulnerable people.") Myanmar's Ministry of Planning and Finance did not respond to a request for comment on how funds had been appropriated.

A lobbyist for the military junta reported that the junta would like to improve relations with the United States and distance Myanmar from China, believing Myanmar had grown too close to China under Aung San Suu Kyi.

=== Geopolitical considerations ===
China is depicted in Western media as having hegemony over Myanmar. China and Russia vetoed a United Nations Security Council resolution condemning the coup. China and Russia are reportedly the main suppliers of weapons to the Myanmar Army. Chinese foreign direct investment in Myanmar totalled $19 billion in 2019, compared with $700 million from the EU. The Financial Times argues that Russia is supportive of the junta in order to sell more arms to them.

The Myanmar military government did not attend the 27 October 2021 East Asia Summit. The United States and ASEAN (chaired by Brunei) criticized the junta's treatment of political prisoners, and Cambodian Prime Minister Hun Sen described Myanmar's decision to skip the summit as "regrettable". US President Joe Biden said "We must address the tragedy caused by the military coup which is increasingly undermining regional stability," and called for the "military regime to end the violence, release all political prisoners and return to the path of democracy". While ASEAN urged constitutional government, it also officially "reiterated that Myanmar remains a member of the ASEAN family".

== Legal basis ==
The legality of the coup has been questioned by legal scholars, including Melissa Crouch. The International Commission of Jurists found that, by staging a coup, the military had violated Myanmar's constitution, since the alleged election irregularities did not justify the declaration of a state of emergency in comport with the Constitution. Further, the jurists found that the military's actions had violated the fundamental rule of law principle. The NLD has also rejected the legal basis for the military takeover.

During its announcement of the coup, the military stated that, during a meeting chaired by Min Aung Hlaing, the NDSC had invoked Articles 417 and 418 of the 2008 Constitution and that this served as the legal basis for the military takeover. However, Article 417 of the Constitution authorises only a sitting president to declare a state of emergency, following consultation with the National Defence and Security Council (NDSC) and, since half of the NDSC's members at the time of the coup were civilians, including the president, the civilian-elected second vice-president, and the speakers of the upper and lower houses, all of whom had been arrested by the military, it is unclear how this meeting could have been constitutionally convened. The incumbent civilian president Win Myint had not voluntarily ceded his role; instead, the state of emergency was unconstitutionally declared by vice-president Myint Swe. During Win Myint's court testimony on 12 October, he revealed that on 1 February before the coup, two senior military generals had attempted to force him to resign, under the guise of "ill health".

The declaration of a state of emergency then transfers legislative, executive, and judicial authority to the Commander-in-Chief per Article 418. On 23 March 2021, during a news conference in Naypyidaw, the Tatmadaw defended the reimposition of the junta and claimed that ousted national leader Aung San Suu Kyi was corrupt, tantamount to graft. No supporting evidence for these allegations was offered outside of the taped testimony of a former colleague of Kyi, Phyo Min Thein, who has been detained by the military since the coup began.

== Reactions ==
=== Domestic ===
==== Protests ====
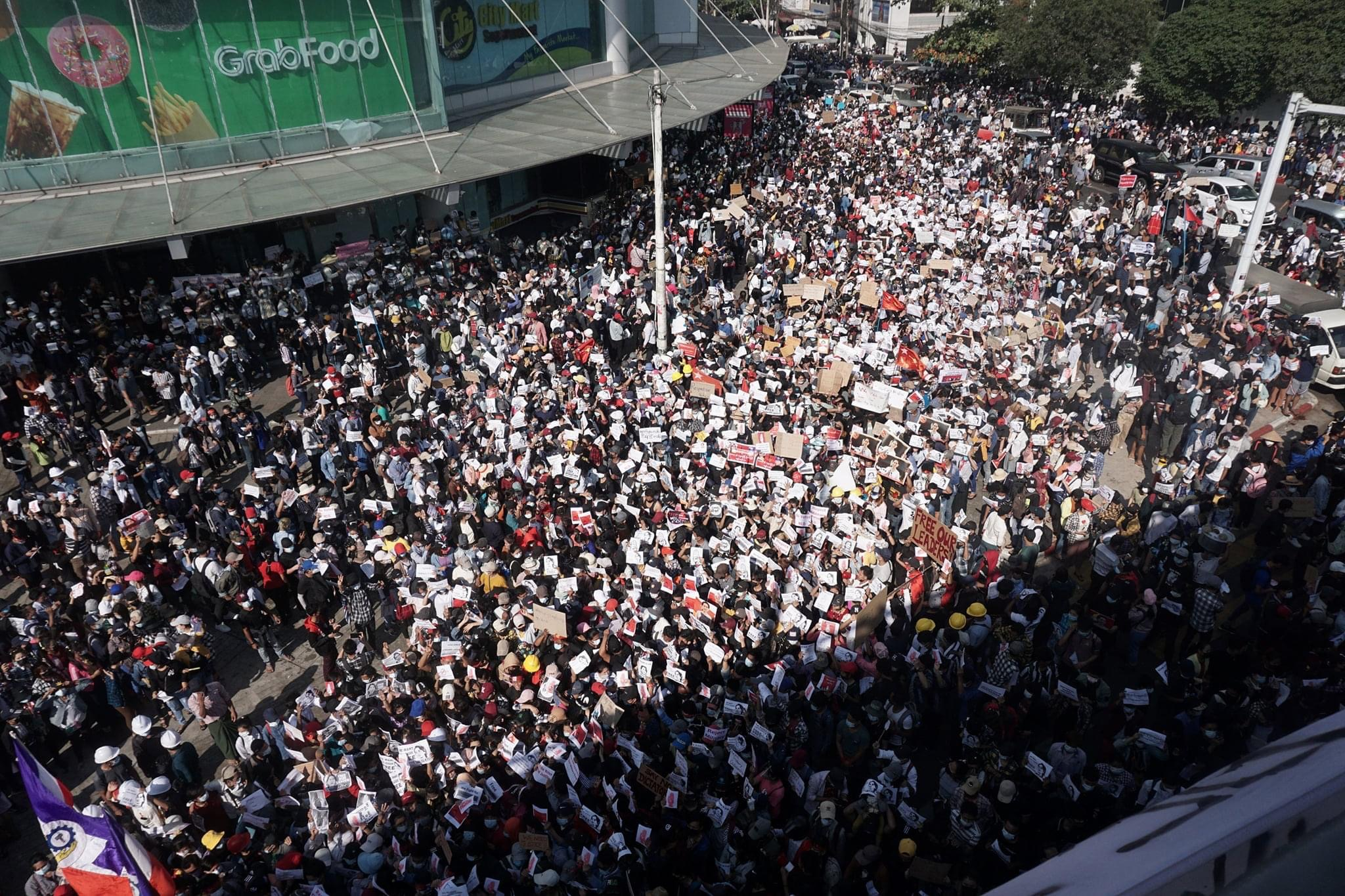
Thousands of protesters participate in an anti-military rally in Yangon.

Civil resistance efforts have emerged within the country, in opposition to the coup, in numerous forms, including acts of civil disobedience, labour strikes, a military boycott campaign, a pot-banging movement, a red ribbon campaign, public protests, and formal recognition of the election results by elected representatives. The three-finger salute has been widely adopted as a protest symbol, while netizens joined the Milk Tea Alliance, an online democratic solidarity movement in Asia. "Kabar Ma Kyay Bu" (ကမ္ဘာမကျေဘူး), a song that was first popularised as the anthem of the 8888 Uprising, has been revitalised by the civil disobedience movement as a protest song.

Since the onset of the coup, residents in urban centres such as Yangon staged cacerolazos, striking pots and pans in unison every evening as a symbolic act to drive away evil, as a method of expressing their opposition to the coup.

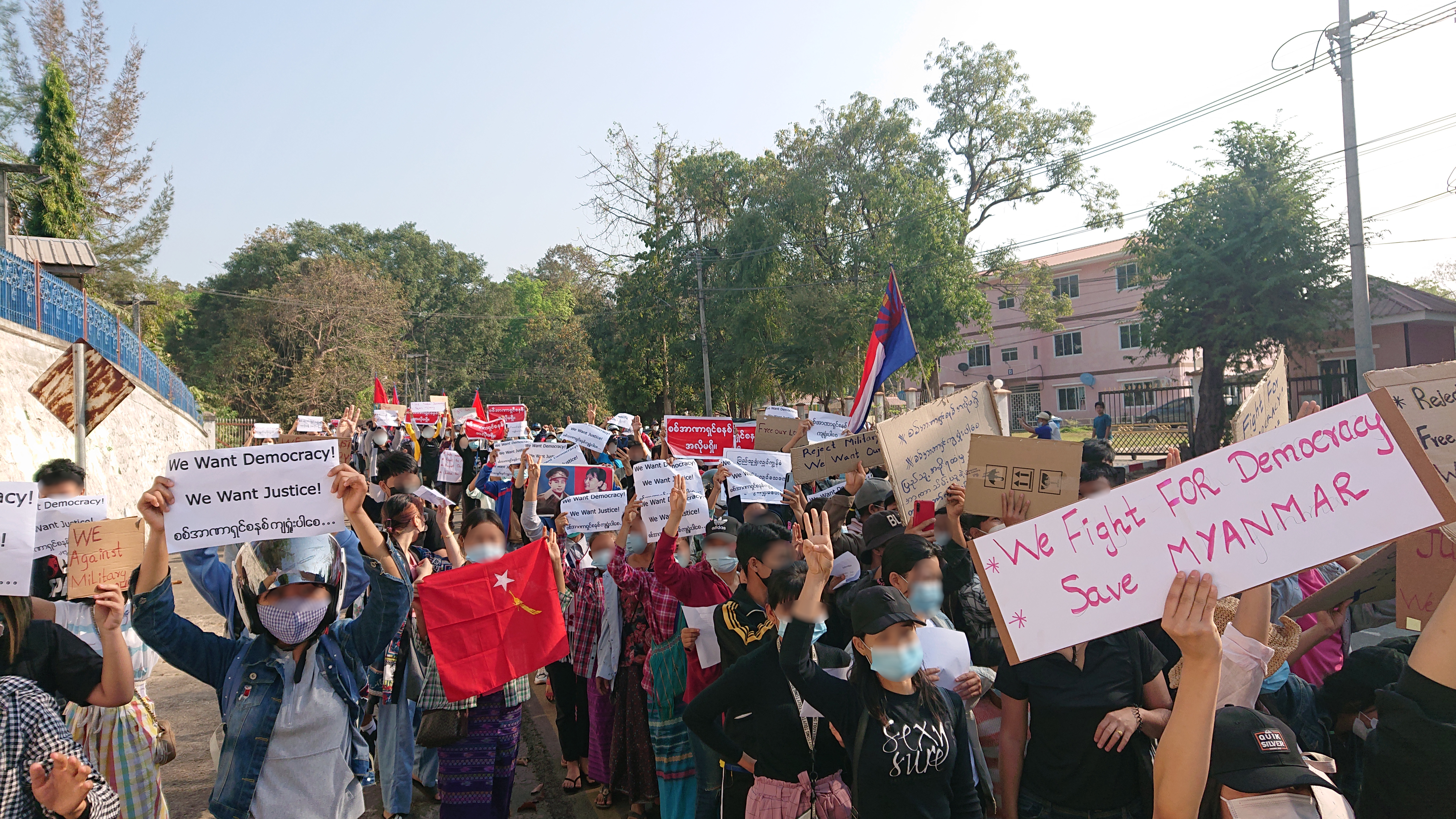
Demonstration against the military coup on 9 February 2021

On 2 February, healthcare workers and civil servants across the country launched a national civil disobedience campaign, in opposition to the coup, with workers from dozens of state-run hospitals and institutions initiating a labour strike. A Facebook campaign group, dubbed the "Civil Disobedience Movement", has attracted 150,000 followers within 24 hours of its launch on 2 February. As of 3 February, healthcare workers in over 110 government hospitals and healthcare agencies have participated in the movement. The labour strikes have spread to other parts of the civil service, including union-level ministries and universities, as well as to private firms, such as factories and copper mines, students, and youth groups.

On 3 February, healthcare workers launched the red ribbon campaign (ဖဲကြိုးနီလှုပ်ရှားမှု), the colour red being associated with the NLD. The red ribbon has been adopted by civil servants and workers across Myanmar as a symbol of opposition to the military regime.

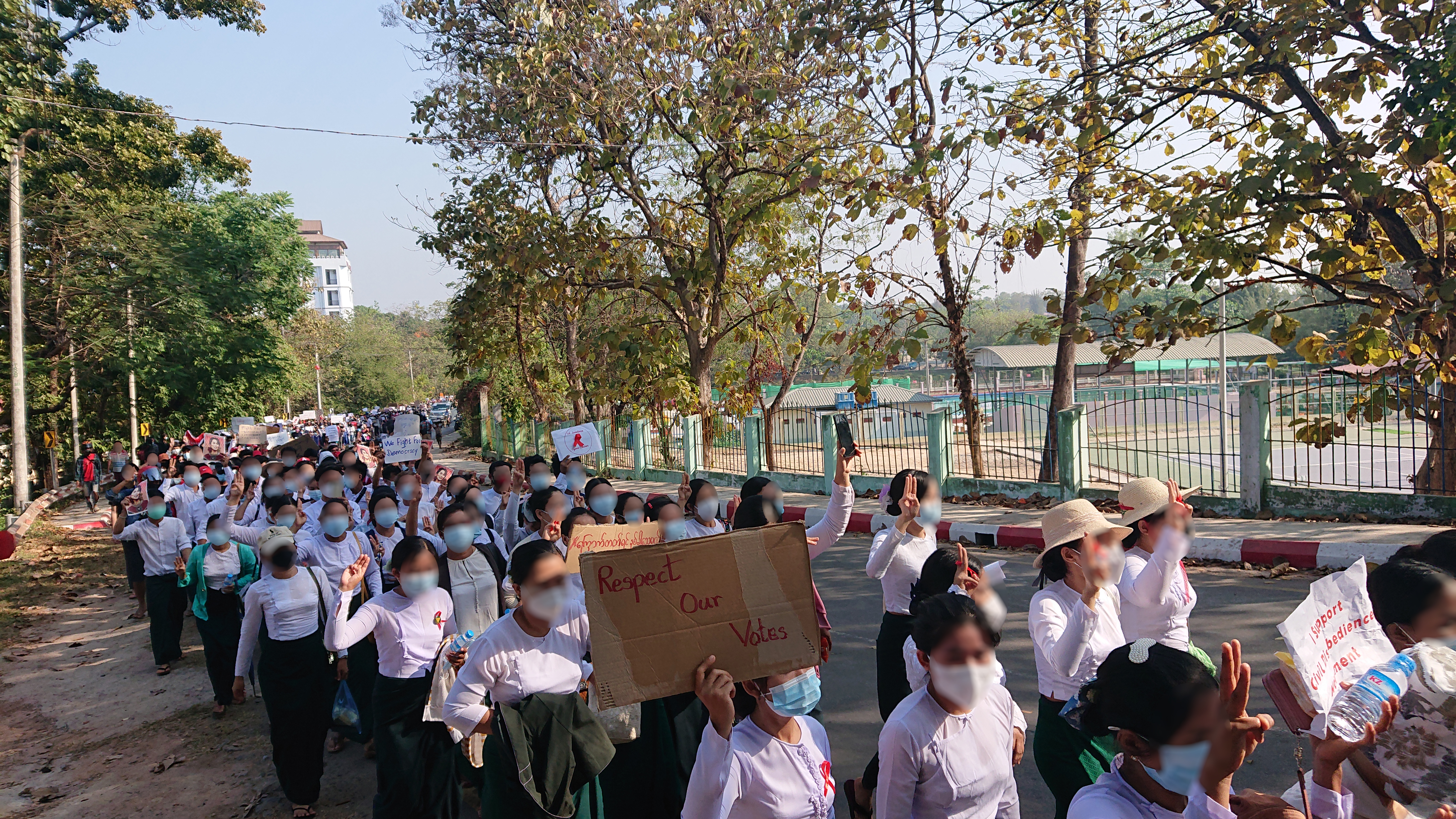
Teachers are protesting in Hpa-An, capital city of Kayin State, 9 February 2021

On 3 February, a domestic boycott movement called the "Stop Buying Junta Business" campaign also emerged, calling for the boycott of products and services linked to the Myanmar military. Among the targeted goods and services in the Burmese military's significant business portfolio include Mytel, a national telecoms carrier, Myanmar, Mandalay, and Dagon Beer, several coffee and tea brands, 7th Sense Creation, which was co-founded by Min Aung Hlaing's daughter, and bus lines.

Public protests have also emerged in the wake of the coup. On 2 February, some Yangonites staged a brief 15-minute protest rally at 8 pm, calling for the overthrow of the dictatorship and Aung San Suu Kyi's release. On 4 February, thirty people, led by Tayzar San, protested against the coup in front of the University of Medicine in Mandalay, leading to four arrests. On 6 February, 20,000 protestors took part in a street protest in Yangon against the coup, calling for Aung San Suu Kyi to be released. Workers from 14 trade unions participated in the protests. Protests spread to Mandalay and to the Pyinmana township of Naypyidaw on the afternoon of 6 February. The Mandalay marches started at 1 pm. Protestors continued on motorbikes at 4:00 pm in reaction to police restrictions. Police were in control by 6 pm. On 9 February 2021, the military used violence to crackdown on peaceful protests, injuring six protestors, including a 20-year-old woman who was shot in the head. About 100 demonstrators were arrested in Mandalay. On 10 February 2021, most of the arrested demonstrators from Mandalay were released.

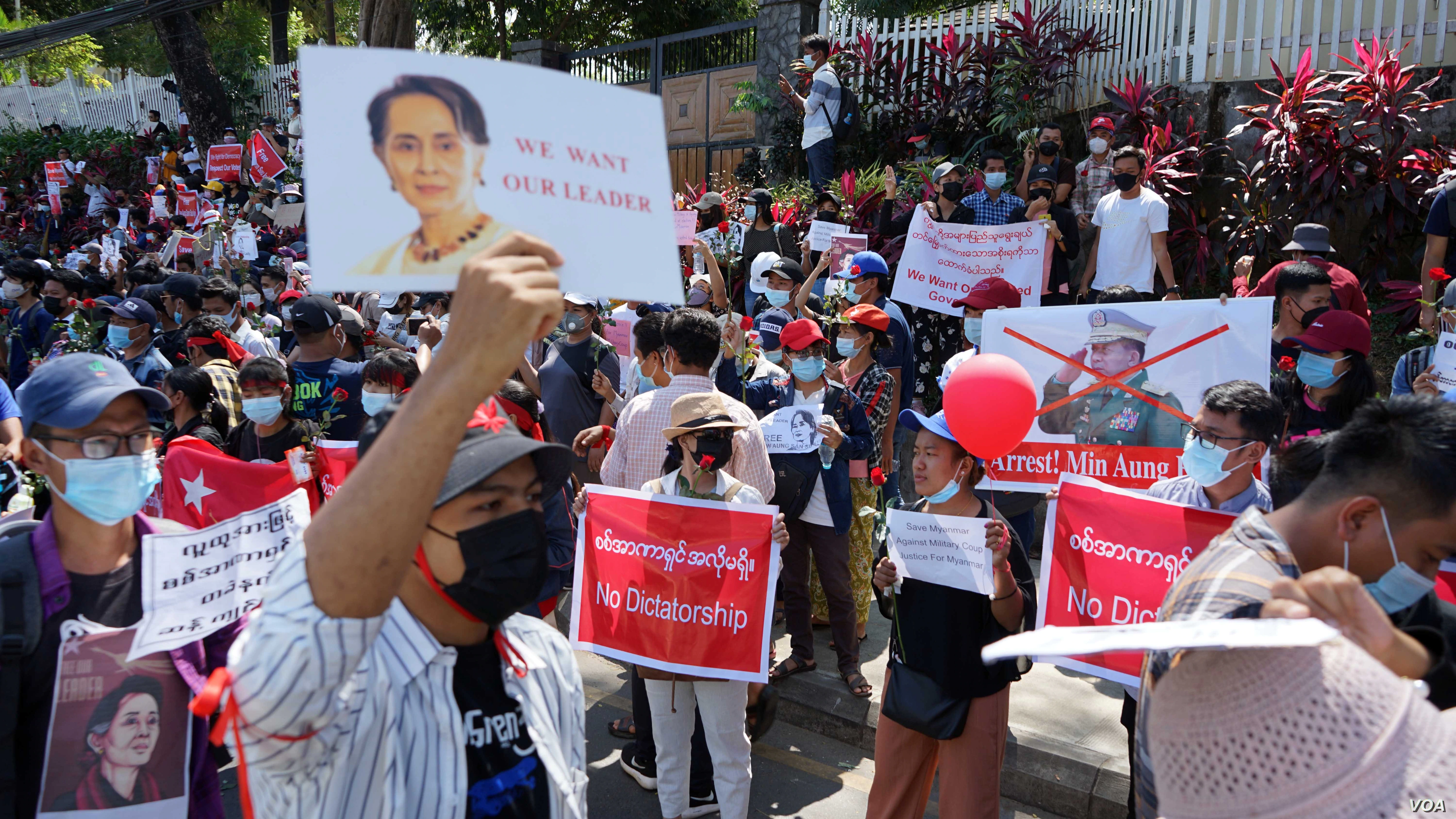
Protesters hold posters with the image of detained civilian leader Aung San Suu Kyi

Youth groups protested on the roads by wearing cosplay costumes, skirts, wedding dresses, and other unusual clothing for daily life while holding signboards and vinyl banners that break with the country's more traditional protest messages for the purpose of grabbing attention from both domestic and international press media.

On 12 February, the Union Day in Myanmar, junta's crackdown in Mawlamyine became more intense as shots were fired. Gunfire was heard in Myitkyina, Kachin State, when security forces clashed with protesters on 14 February. Five journalists were arrested afterwards. Troops joined police in forcefully dispersing marchers using rubber bullets and slingshots in the city of Mandalay.

==== Activities on social media and Internet blackout ====
Facebook had been used to organise the civil disobedience campaign's labour strikes and the emerging boycott movement. On 4 February, telecom operators and internet providers across Myanmar were ordered to block Facebook until 7 February, to ensure the "country's stability". MPT, a state-owned carrier, also blocked Facebook Messenger, Instagram and WhatsApp services, while Telenor Myanmar blocked only Facebook. Following the Facebook ban, Burmese users had begun flocking to Twitter, popularising hashtags like #RespectOurVotes, #HearTheVoiceofMyanmar, and #SaveMyanmar. On 5 February, the government extended the social media access ban to include Instagram and Twitter. On the morning of 6 February, the military authorities initiated an internet outage nationwide. Internet access was restricted by the government again since 14 February 2021 for 20 days, from 1:00 am to 9:00 am. People have used social media like Facebook and Twitter to reach their voices to international communities and also to share photo and video evidence of brutality of military forces on the protestors.

==== Religious response ====
Various Buddhist monasteries and educational institutions have denounced the coup, among them the Masoyein and Mahāgandhārāma monasteries. Sitagu International Buddhist Academy also released a statement imploring against actions that run counter to the Dhamma. Aside from the Buddhist saṅgha, local clergy and monastics of the Catholic Church have similarly voiced their opposition to the military takeover.

As the military response to the ensuing protests started taking a violent turn, the Shwekyin Nikāya, Burma's second largest monastic order, urged Min Aung Hlaing to immediately cease the assaults on unarmed civilians and to refrain from engaging in theft and property destruction. Its leading monks, including Ñāṇissara Bhikkhu, who is known for his amicable relationship with the military, reminded the general to be a good Buddhist, which entailed keeping to the Five Precepts required for rebirth as at least a human.

==== Commercial reactions ====
Thailand's largest industrial estate developer, Amata, halted a $1 billion industrial zone development project in Yangon in response to the coup, having started construction in December 2020. Suzuki Motor, Myanmar's largest automaker, and several manufacturers halted domestic operations in the wake of the coup. The Yangon Stock Exchange has also suspended trading since 1 February. Myanmar's real estate market crashed as a result of the coup, with sales and purchase transactions dropping by almost 100%.

On 4 February, French oil multinational Total SE announced it was reviewing the impact of the coup on its domestic operations and projects. On 4 April, it issued a statement saying it would not withhold payments to the military junta and would not cease operations in its Yadana offshore gasfield where electricity is generated for public use. A couple of weeks later there were reports of US oil giant Chevron lobbying against United States Department of State sanctions restricting the company in its capacity as "a non-operating partner" in the Yadana field through an affiliate.

On 5 February, Kirin Company ended its joint venture with the military-owned Myanma Economic Holdings Limited (MEHL). The joint venture, Myanmar Brewery, produces several brands of beer, including Myanmar Beer, and has an 80% market share in the country. Kirin's stake had been valued at US$1.7 billion.

On 8 February, Lim Kaling, early investor of Razer announced he was divesting his stake in a joint venture with a Singaporean tobacco company that owns a 49% stake in Virginia Tobacco, whose majority stake is owned by MEHL. Virginia Tobacco, Myanmar's largest cigarette maker, owns the Red Ruby and Premium Gold brands. That evening, Min Aung Hlaing made a televised address, aiming to ease concerns about Myanmar's foreign investment climate.

US President Joe Biden and his administration imposed sanctions on the military leaders of the coup in Myanmar and froze 1 billion dollars in government assets held in the United States on 11 February 2021.

After several protesters were shot dead by the military during the protests on February, Facebook responded by suspending several accounts belonging to the government including Tatmadaw and its news website, Tatmadaw True News, and MRTV, due to these pages linked to promoting violence. On 25 February, Facebook banned all accounts of the Tatmadaw, along with its related commercial entities. Parent company Facebook Inc (now Meta) also implemented the ban on Instagram. Other tech companies follow suit, with YouTube terminated several channels belonging to governments including MRTV and Myawaddy TV, and TikTok restricting several violence contents from being available in their platform.

On 16 April 2021, South Korean steel giant Posco announced that its Myanmar subsidiary, POSCO C&C, would end its relationship with military-owned Myanma Economic Holdings Limited (MEHL). On 27 October, Indian-owned Adani Ports & SEZ announced it would terminate its US$127 million investment in Myanmar to construct a container terminal in the country. Foreign direct investment in Myanmar fell to an eight-year low, dropping 22% to US$3.8 billion in Myanmar's 2020 fiscal year (September 2020 and September 2021), due to the combined pressures of COVID and political unrest following the February coup.

==== Defections ====
As the protests have started, there have been reported defections from the Myanmar Police Force. On 5 March 2021, 11 officers were seen to have crossed the India–Myanmar land border to Mizoram state with their families due to refusing orders to engage protestors by using lethal force. Myanmar officials have reached out to India to repatriate the defecting police officers located in Mizoram, with the reply that the Indian government will make a final decision. The Assam Rifles were given orders to tighten security along the India–Myanmar border. As of 5 March 2021, more than 600 police officers have joined the anti-regime movement, some of whom have served as police officers for many years and have collected awards for their outstanding performances. From 10 March, the border has been closed after 48 Burmese nationals have crossed it.

Some military personnel from Tatmadaw also left their posts to stand with the people against the military junta. Among them are Captain Tun Myat Aung from the 77th Light Infantry Division and Major Hein Thaw Oo from the 99th Light Infantry Division who holds the highest rank among the known defectors from Myanmar's military as of 21 April 2021. Both of them cited the corruption among the high-ranked military officers and the lack of will to kill their own people as main reasons for their defection.

=== International ===
==== Governmental responses ====
Myanmar Condemns the coup Expressions of concern Neutral position No public position

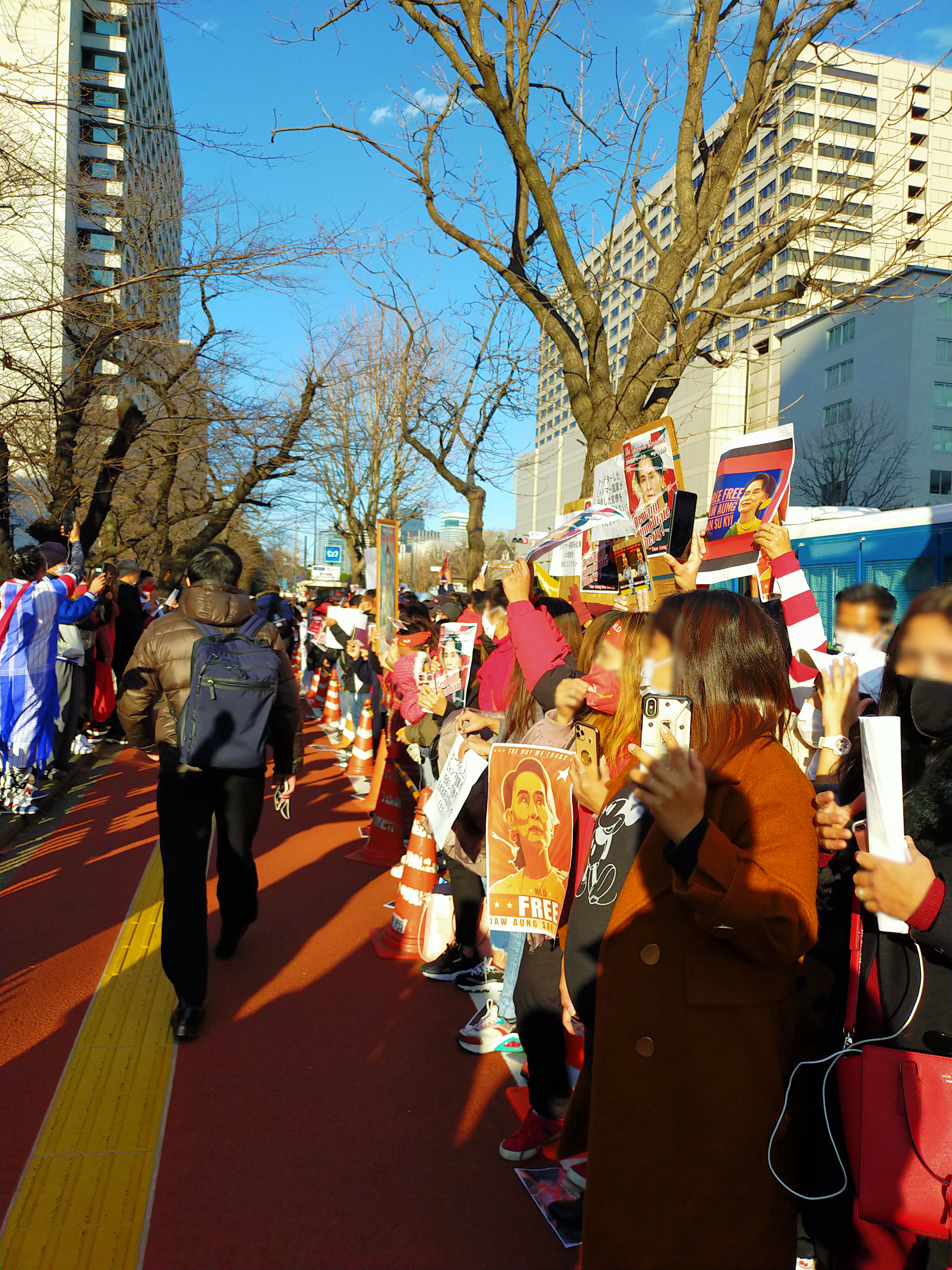
3,000 protesters asking for Aung San Suu Kyi's release in Kasumigaseki, Tokyo, Japan.

Many countries, including Bangladesh, China, India, Indonesia, Japan, Malaysia, Pakistan, the Philippines, South Korea, and Singapore, encouraged dialogue between the government and the military in order to resolve the issue, many of which expressed concern in response to the coup. Australia, Canada, France, Germany, Italy, Japan, Nepal, New Zealand, South Korea, Spain, Sweden, Turkey, the United Kingdom, and the United States condemned the coup and called for the release of detained officials; the White House also threatened to impose sanctions on coup perpetrators. Subsequently, President Biden approved an Executive Order for new sanctions on the coup perpetrators which would enable his administration to affect the perpetrator's business interests and close family members." President Biden also stated that he would freeze $1 billion US assets belonged to the Myanmar's government while maintaining support for health care, civil society groups, and other areas that benefit the people of Burma directly."

Cambodia, Thailand, and Vietnam explicitly refused to support either side, characterising the coup as an internal matter. On 9 February 2021, New Zealand suspended diplomatic contact with Myanmar and prohibited government military leaders from entering New Zealand because of the coup. On 25 February 2021, Tokyo considered halting projects in Myanmar in response to the coup.

On 24 February, the new Myanmar foreign minister visited Thailand, marking the first high official visit since the coup. Malaysian Prime Minister Muhyiddin Yassin and Indonesian President Joko Widodo called a special meeting of ASEAN foreign ministers to discuss the issue during Muhyiddin's visit to Jakarta. In March, reports appeared in the Thai press accusing the Thai military of supplying rice to the Myanmar military, which it denied.

On 26 February 2021, the South Korean National Assembly passed a resolution condemning the coup. On 5 March 2021, Japanese Chief Cabinet Secretary Katsunobu Kato urged the SAC-led government to stop using lethal force to disperse protests. Singaporean foreign minister Vivian Balakrishnan also called the military to stop using lethal force.

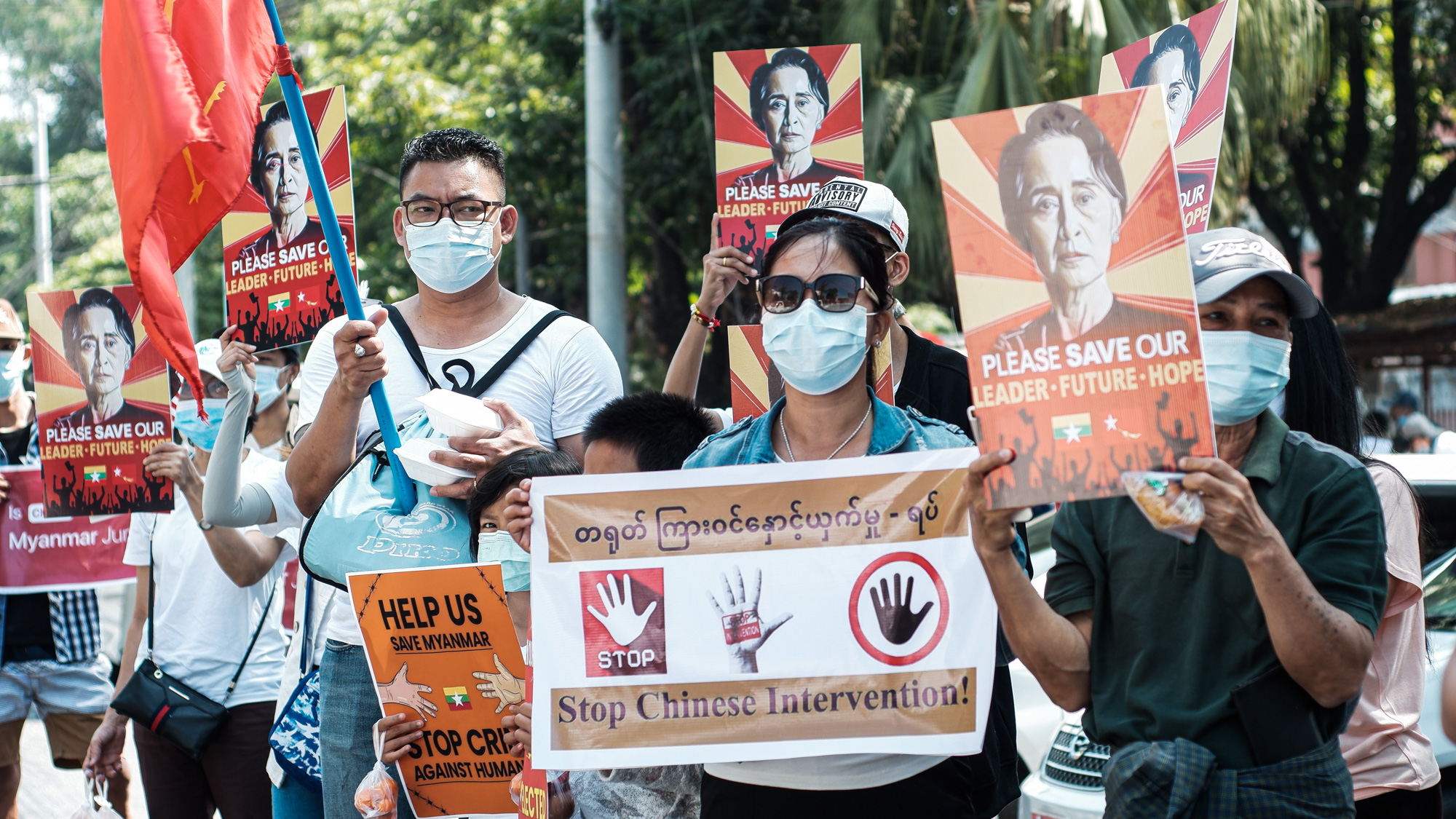
Demonstration against the military coup on 14 February 2021

South Korean Ministry of Foreign Affairs announced on 12 March 2021 that South Korea will suspend defense exchanges with Myanmar and ban arms exports, and would limit exports of other strategic items, reconsider development aid and grant humanitarian exemptions for Myanmar nationals to allow them to stay in South Korea until the situation improves.

On 27 March 2021, eight countries ‑ India, China, Pakistan, Bangladesh, Vietnam, Laos, Thailand and Russia ‑ sent representatives to attend the Myanmar Armed Forces Day parade.

==== Intergovernmental responses ====
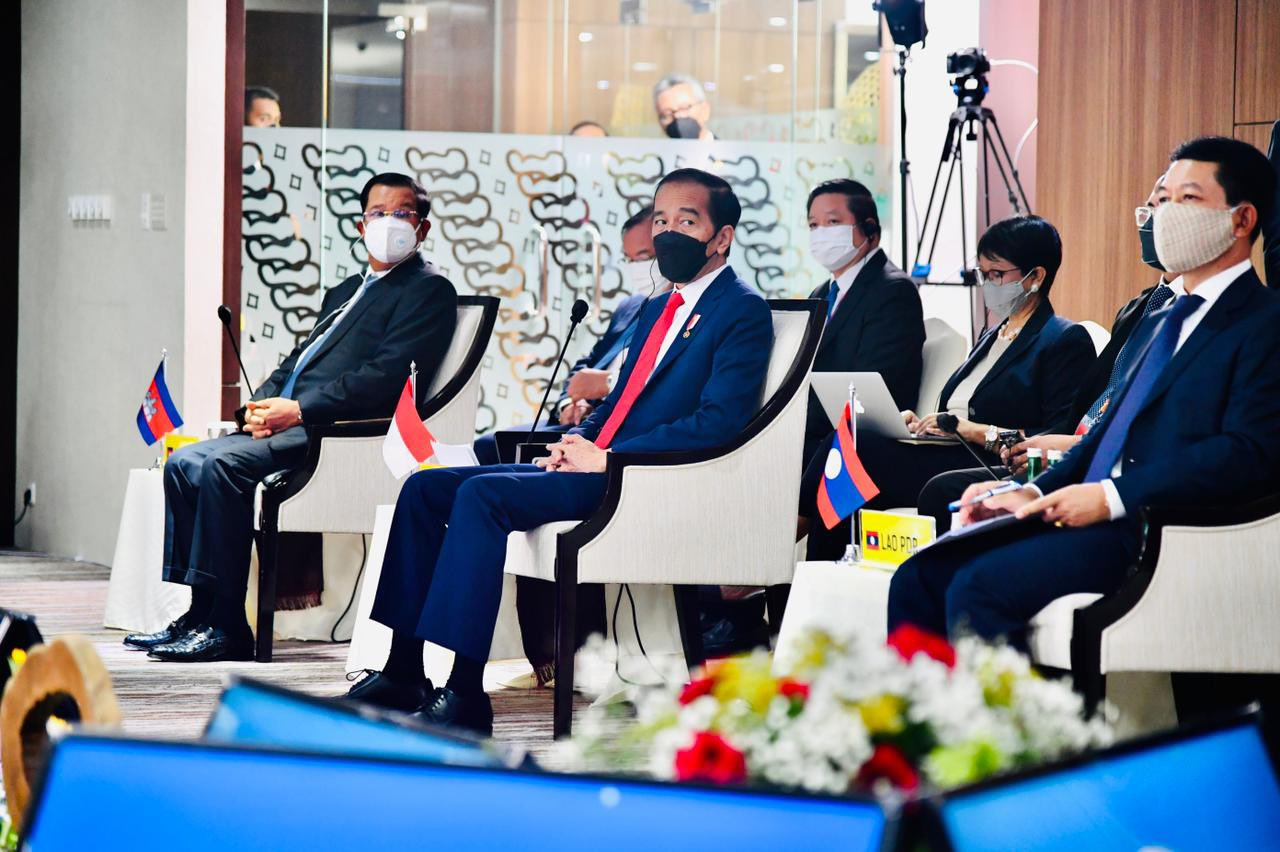
Hun Sen and Joko Widodo, leaders of Cambodia and Indonesia, at a special ASEAN Summit on the coup in April 2021.

Intergovernmental organisations, including the United Nations, ASEAN, and the European Union expressed concern and called for dialogue from both sides. In addition to concern, the European Union also condemned the coup and urged the release of detainees.

In response to the coup, the United Nations Security Council held an emergency meeting, where a British-drafted resolution urging the "restoration of democracy" in Myanmar, condemning the Myanmar military's action, and calling for the release of detainees was proposed. The first draft of the statement was not issued because of failure to garner support from all 15 council members; the diplomats of China and Russia reportedly had to relay the draft to their respective governments for review. China and Russia, as permanent members of the council and therefore having the power of veto, refused to back the statement. India and Vietnam, two non-permanent members, also "voiced reservations" about the resolution.

However, through negotiations, by 10 March 2021 — with explicit condemnation of the Myanmar military and its coup removed from the statement, along with removal of the threat of U.N. sanctions — a consensus was reached among the 15 Security Council members, resulting in a "presidential statement" from the Security Council (a step below a "resolution".) The statement condemned the violence, called for its end, and restraint by the military, and the prompt release of the detained civilian government officials (including State Counsellor Aung San Suu Kyi and President Win Myint), and a negotiated settlement between the parties within the framework of the Myanmar Constitution.

The UNSC presidential statement further urged all parties to cooperate with mediation efforts of the ASEAN, and the U.N. envoy to Myanmar, and to ensure access to humanitarian aid for all in Myanmar. The resolution also addressed the 2017 military crackdown in Myanmar's Rakhine State (which had targeted the Rohingya Muslim minority, there, most of whom were driven out of the country) — noting that the current conditions were preventing the Rohingya's "voluntary, safe, dignified, and sustainable return" to Myanmar. ASEAN called for a special ASEAN Leaders Meeting in Jakarta on 24 April 2021, with Min Aung Hlaing in attendance along with other member states' heads of government and foreign ministers. Members of the National Unity Government formed in response to the coup and consisting of ousted lawmakers were reported to have been in contact with ASEAN leaders, but were not formally invited to the meeting. During the summit, Min Aung Hlaing was not referred to as a head of state. ASEAN released a statement that it had agreed to a "five-point consensus" with Min Aung Hlaing on the cessation of violence in Myanmar, constructive dialogue among all parties concerned, and the appointment of a special envoy by ASEAN to facilitate the dialogue process.

On 28 May 2021, the governments of Brunei, Cambodia, Indonesia, Laos, Malaysia, the Philippines, Singapore, Thailand and Vietnam proposed that a U.N. draft resolution on Myanmar be watered down, including removing a call for an arms embargo against the country.

On 27 July 2021, U.N. Special Rapporteur Tom Andrews urged the U.N. Security Council and member states to advance a "COVID ceasefire" in Myanmar. At the time of his report, over 600 healthcare professionals were eluding outstanding arrest warrants and 67 had already been detained in the midst of soaring COVID-19 infections and deaths throughout the country.

==== Protests outside Myanmar ====
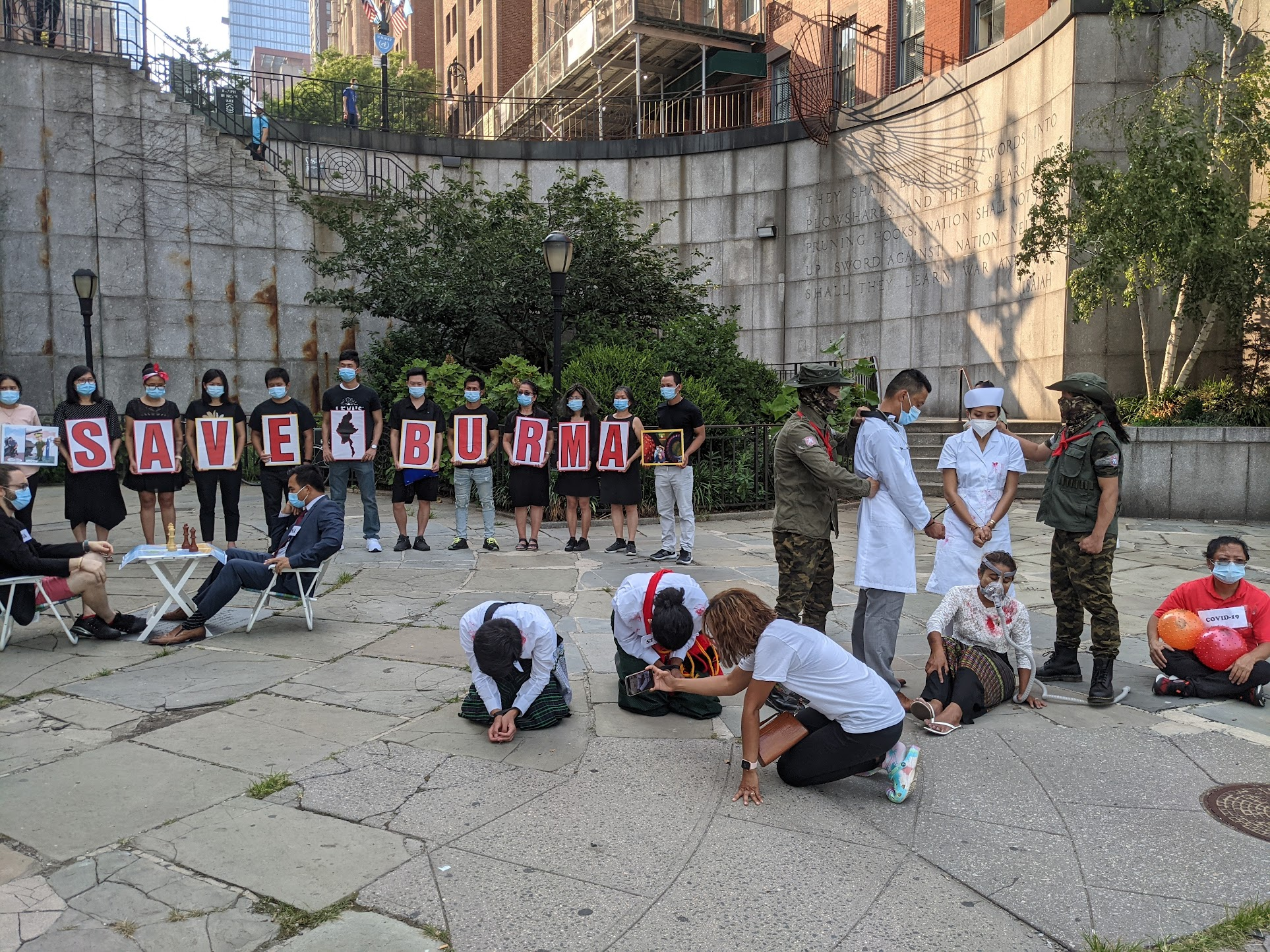
Protest in favor of a Myanmar "COVID ceasefire" on 27 July 2021, across from the United Nations in New York, NY.

A group of about 200 Burmese expatriates and some Thai pro-democracy activists protested the coup at the Burmese embassy on Sathon Nuea Road in Bangkok, Thailand. Some protesters reportedly showed the three-finger salute, the symbol used in the protests calling for democracy in Thailand. The protest ended with a police crackdown; two protestors were injured and hospitalised, and two others were arrested. Burmese citizens in Tokyo, Japan gathered in front of the United Nations University, also to protest against the coup. On 3 February, more than 150 Burmese Americans protested in front of the Embassy of Myanmar in Washington, D.C.

The Singapore Police Force issued warnings on 5 February 2021 against foreigners planning to participate in anti-coup protests in Singapore. On 14 February 2021, SPF officers arrested three foreigners for protesting at the outskirts of the Myanmar embassy without permits to participate in a public assembly. In March 2021, the Public Security Police Force of Macau has warned Myanmar residents that they are not allowed to conduct anti-coup protests as Article 27 of the Macau Basic Law only allows Macanese residents the right to do so.

==== Evacuations ====
On 4 February 2021, Japanese expats living/working in Myanmar were evacuated from Yangon International Airport to Narita International Airport after the coup on 1 February. On 21 February, Taiwanese government started the evacuation process of Taiwanese expatriates in Myanmar, Taiwanese government also urged Taiwanese expatriates who wished to go back to get in touch with China Airlines. On 7 March, the South Korean government ordered a chartered Korean Air flight from Yangon to Seoul to return South Korean expatriates from Myanmar. On the same day, the Indonesian and Singaporean governments urged their citizens to leave Myanmar as soon as possible due to safety reasons. The British government also urged British citizens who stayed in Myanmar to immediately leave the country due to rising violence.

== See also ==
- 2014 Thai coup d'état
- 2017 Venezuelan constitutional crisis
- 2020–2021 Thai protests
- Ampun Bang Jago § Video during the Myanmar coup d'état
- International isolation
- List of cabinet members of State Administration Council
