= Sagaing Region Hluttaw =

Legislature of Sagaing Region, Myanmar

Sagaing Region Hluttaw စစ်ကိုင်းတိုင်းဒေသကြီးလွှတ်တော်
- 3rd Sagaing Region Hluttaw

Type
- Type: Unicameral

History
- Founded: 8 February 2016

Leadership
- Speaker: U Tint Hlaing Myint, USDP since 2025-26 Myanmar general election
- Deputy Speaker: U Myo Thant, USDP since 2025-26 Myanmar general election

Structure
- Seats: 101; 76 elected MPs; 25 military appointees
- Political groups: National League for Democracy (69)* Military (25); Union Solidarity and Development Party (5) Tai-Leng Nationalities Development Party (2)*

Elections
- Last election: 8 November 2015

Meeting place
- Region Hluttaw Meeting Hall; Monywa, Sagaing Region

Website
- sagaingregion.hluttaw.mm

Footnotes
- Includes one 'Ethnic Ministers (Chin)' from the NLD, one 'Ethnic Ministers (Tai-Leng)' from the TNDP.

Sagaing Region Hluttaw (Burmese: စစ်ကိုင်းတိုင်းဒေသကြီးလွှတ်တော်; lit. 'Sagaing Region Assembly') is the legislature of Myanmar's Sagaing Region. It is a unicameral body, consisting of 101 members, including 76 elected members and 25 military representatives. Following the elections held from late 2025 to early 2026, the Union Solidarity and Development Party (USDP) commands a majority in the hluttaw.

As of the 2015 general election, the NLD won 69 out of the 75 contested seats in the legislature, based on the most recent election results.

== Legislative Powers ==
Under the 2008 Constitution of Myanmar and specifically "Schedule Two - Region or State Legislative List" of the constitution, the Sagaing Region Hluttaw can legislate on the following matters:

- Agriculture and Livestock Breeding Sector
- Economic Sector
- Energy, Electricity, Mining and Forestry Sector
- Finance and Planning Sector
- Industrial Sector
- Management Sector
- Social Sector
- Transport, Communication and Construction Sector

== Election results ==
=== 2015 ===
Party	Seats	+/–
National League for Democracy (NLD)	69	▲69
Union Solidarity and Development Party (USDP)	5	▼62
Tai-Leng Nationalities Development Party (TNDP)	2	▲2
National Unity Party (NUP)	0	▼8
Chin Progressive Party (CPP)	0	▼1
Military appointed	25	
Total	101	

== Government Guarantees, Admission and Commitment Appraisal Committee ==
The Government Guarantees, Admission and Commitment Appraisal Committee (Burmese: အစိုးရ၏ အာမခံချက်များ၊ ကတိကဝတ်များနှင့် တာဝန်ခံချက်များ စိစစ်ရေးကော်မတီ) was founded in Sagaing Region Hluttaw by MPs. The chairwoman is Su Myat Htet (Sagaing Township Constituency No.2 MP) and the secretary is Khin Myo Chit (Kanbalu Township Constituency No.1 MP). The committee was founded by 7 members (MPs).

No	Name	Constituency	Duties
1.	Suu Myat Htet	Sagaing Township No2	Chairperson
2.	Khin Myo Chit	Kanbalu Township No.1	Secretary
3.	Hnin Khine Soe	Tabayin Township No.1	Member
4.	Aye Myat Mon	Myaung Township No.2	Member
5.	Aung May Yi	Yinmabin Township No.2	Member
6.	Khine Khine Win	Wuntho Township No.2	Member
7.	Thet Naing Aye	military representative	Member

== See also ==
- State and Region Hluttaws
- Pyidaungsu Hluttaw
