= Elections in Myanmar =

Myanmar is a unitary republic, with elected representatives at the national state or region levels. On the national level, the president who is the head of state and legislature, is elected indirectly through an Electoral College. According to the 2008 constitution, the term durations of the President, and Cabinet are five years. All elections are regulated by the Union Election Commission.

Myanmar is divided into 330 constituencies, and elections are only held in constituencies where there is more than one candidate. Otherwise, a representative is selected from each constituency with an additional 110 seats appointed by the military, These 440 representatives comprise the Pyithu Hluttaw. The Election Commission, a body dominated by the military, may decide not to hold elections in certain constituencies where they deem the situation unsafe. The goal of the election is to appoint Members of the Assembly in both the upper house (Amyotha Hluttaw; National Assembly) and the lower house (Pyithu Hluttaw; People's Assembly) of the Pyidaungsu Hluttaw (Union Assembly), and State and Region Hluttaws. Ethnic Affairs Ministers are also elected by their designated electorates on the same day, although only select ethnic minorities in particular states and regions are entitled to vote for them.

The country has had 18 general elections since 1922. Following the 2026 elections, in which the Union Solidarity and Development Party increased its majority.

== Latest elections ==
=== Pyithu Hluttaw ===
Pyithu Hluttaw results for the first phase were released in portions from January 2 to January 4, 2026. Agence-France Presse called the first phase for the USDP, with 89 out of 102 (87%) of the first-phase seats won. Results for 14 additional constituencies were also announced in the first set of results, for a total of 116 constituencies declared, of which the USDP won 102. Many USDP candidates, especially in Naypyidaw Union Territory, were powerful retired military officers, including Tin Aung San, Khin Maung Myint, USDP deputy leader Myat Hein, Maung Maung Ohn, USDP leader Khin Yi, and Hla Swe, as well as Mya Tun Oo in Mandalay Region.

Party	Votes	%	Seats
Union Solidarity and Development Party	5,753,096	44.20	231
National Unity Party	1,744,943	13.41	4
People's Party	1,149,720	8.83	0
People's Pioneer Party	1,000,815	7.69	0
Shan Nationalities Democratic Party	802,414	6.16	7
Myanmar Farmers Development Party	691,628	5.31	0
Pa-O National Organisation	331,331	2.55	5
Mon Unity Party	145,786	1.12	5
Kayin People's Party	124,805	0.96	0
88 Generation Student Youths (Union of Myanmar) Party	100,883	0.78	0
Danu National Democracy Party	81,465	0.63	1
Federal Democratic Party	74,142	0.57	0
National Interest and Development Party	48,926	0.38	0
Karen National Democratic Party	48,702	0.37	1
Inn National League Party	44,037	0.34	1
Phalon-Sawaw Democratic Party	33,772	0.26	0
Naga National Party	32,386	0.25	4
Tai-Leng Nationalities Development Party	29,375	0.23	0
Modern People Party	26,121	0.20	0
Peace and Development Party	25,457	0.20	0
United Nationalities Democracy Party	25,249	0.19	0
Union Peace and Unity Party	25,098	0.19	0
Democratic Party	25,002	0.19	0
Socio-Economic Promotion Party	23,114	0.18	0
Arakan Front Party	22,567	0.17	0
Kachin State People's Party	21,765	0.17	1
Democratic Forces Labour Party	20,429	0.16	0
New Generation Wunthanu Party	19,955	0.15	0
People's Party of Myanmar Farmers and Workers	19,818	0.15	0
Shan-ni Solidarity Party	19,564	0.15	1
Rakhine Nationalities Party	18,901	0.15	1
National Political Alliance League Party	17,368	0.13	0
Peace and Diversity Party	16,767	0.13	0
Unity and Development Party	14,173	0.11	0
New National Democracy Party	12,725	0.10	0
Public of Labour Party	11,988	0.09	0
Pa-O National Unity Party	10,960	0.08	0
New Democratic Party (Kachin)	10,613	0.08	0
Mon Progressive Party	9,225	0.07	0
Kayin State People's Party	9,211	0.07	0
Union of Myanmar Federation of National Politics	9,087	0.07	0
Party for the People	7,278	0.06	0
Lisu National Development Party	6,786	0.05	0
Kokang Democracy and Unity Party	6,362	0.05	0
Wa National Party	6,303	0.05	0
Pa-O National Development and Progress Party	6,210	0.05	0
Bamar People's Party	6,097	0.05	0
Myanmar People's Democratic Party	5,696	0.04	0
Peace Party	5,427	0.04	0
National Political New Energy Party	3,186	0.02	0
Kha Mee National Development Party	2,289	0.02	0
Zomi National Party	1,633	0.01	0
Rakhine State National United Party	1,268	0.01	0
New Chinland Congress Party	1,206	0.01	0
Mro National Development Party	555	0.00	0
Khumi (Khami) National Party	231	0.00	0
Independent	303,085	2.33	1
Cancelled			67
Military appointees			110
Total	13,016,995	100.00	440
Source: Union Election Commission

==== By constituencies ====
Pyithu Hluttaw results by constituency
State/Region	Date	Constituency	USDP	NUP	PP	PPP	S&NDP	MFDP	Pa-O NO	Mon UP	Kayin PP	88G	Danu NDP	FDP	NIDP	Karen NDP	Inn NLP	Phalon-Sawaw	Naga NP	Tai-Leng NDP	MPP	P Devel P	UNDP	UPUP	DP	S-EPP	Arakan FP	Kachin SPP	DFLP	NGWP	PPMFW	Shan-ni SP	Rakhine NP	NPALP	P Diversity P	UDP	NNDP	Public of LP	Pa-O NUP	NDP(K)	Mon PP	Kayin SPP	UMFNP	P for the P	Lisu NDP	Kokang DUP	Wa NP	Pa-O NDPP	Bamar PP	MPDP	Peace	NPNEP	Kha Mee NDP	Zomi NP	Rakhine SNUP	New Chinland	Mro NDP	Khumi (Khami)	Ind	Total
Kachin State	28 December 2025	Tanai	7,617	1,823		372		491																																2,198					2,572															15,073
Kachin State	28 December 2025	Kawnglanghpu	2,502	1,429		96																																							642															4,669
Kachin State	28 December 2025	Putao	11,242	3,475		986	1,433	887																				3,236												885																				22,144
Kachin State	28 December 2025	Mohnyin	13,655	4,329		1,961		4,953												11,739																																								36,637
Kachin State	28 December 2025	Myitkyina	24,605	5,102	1,925	5,698	1,598	2,507												3,959								6,311												3,325																				55,030
Kachin State	11 January 2026	Machanbaw	1,452			775																						1,665																																3,892
Kachin State	11 January 2026	Mogaung	19,989			4,053														11,219								8,515																																43,776
Kachin State	11 January 2026	Waingmaw	6,045	1,509		753	1,152	370												1,808								1,846												4,205					3,572															21,260
Kachin State	25 January 2026	Bhamo	4,964			96	65													86								192																																5,403
Kachin State	25 January 2026	Hpakant	1,677			1,397														564																																								3,638
Kachin State	—	Nogmung	Unopposed																																																									—
Kachin State	—	Shwegu	Unopposed																																																									—
Kachin State	—	Mansi	Election not held																																																									
Kachin State	—	Momauk	Election not held																																																									
Kachin State	—	Sumprabum	Election not held																																																									
Kachin State	—	Chipwi	Election not held																																																									
Kachin State	—	Hsawlaw	Election not held																																																									
Kachin State	—	Injangyang	Election not held																																																									
Kayah State	28 December 2025	Bawlakhe	1,569	56		38																																				88																		1,751
Kayah State	28 December 2025	Loikaw	14,493	4,746		4,099																																				8,703																		32,041
Kayah State	11 January 2026	Demoso	1,423			256																																				355																		2,034
Kayah State	11 January 2026	Hpruso	971			15																																				65																		1,051
Kayah State	—	Hpasawng	Election not held																																																									
Kayah State	—	Mese	Election not held																																																									
Kayah State	—	Shadaw	Election not held																																																									
Karen State	28 December 2025	Hpa-an	34,104			3,871										29,196		14,916																					8,407		8,539																			99,033
Karen State	28 December 2025	Myawaddy	7,929			1,823												6,018																					1,591																					17,361
Karen State	28 December 2025	Thandaunggyi	2,001			22												489																																										2,512
Karen State	11 January 2026	Hpapun	4,796			284	442											839																																										6,361
Karen State	11 January 2026	Hlaingbwe	13,937			2,135	2,462									19,506		8,499																																										46,539
Karen State	25 January 2026	Kawkareik	7,332			371												1,637																					962		686																			10,988
Karen State	25 January 2026	Kyain Seikgyi	3,458			325	384											1,374																																										5,541
Chin State	28 December 2025	Tedim	1,992																																																			1,633		610				4,235
Chin State	28 December 2025	Hakha	2,007																																																					596		231		2,834
Chin State	—	Thantlang	Election not held																																																									
Chin State	—	Tonzang	Election not held																																																									
Chin State	—	Falam	Election not held																																																									
Chin State	—	Kanpetlet	Election not held																																																									
Chin State	—	Mindat	Election not held																																																									
Chin State	—	Paletwa	Election not held																																																									
Chin State	—	Matupi	Election not held																																																									
Sagaing Region	28 December 2025	Leshi	3,663																4,769																																									8,432
Sagaing Region	28 December 2025	Lahe	7,334																11,599																																									18,933
Sagaing Region	28 December 2025	Nanyun	9,875																10,107																																									19,982
Sagaing Region	28 December 2025	Kale	19,037	11,135																																																								30,172
Sagaing Region	28 December 2025	Katha	5,852	4,054																																																								9,906
Sagaing Region	28 December 2025	Kanbalu	18,470	4,447	4,579																																																							27,496
Sagaing Region	28 December 2025	Hkamti	3,850	1,087															5,911													2,229																												13,077
Sagaing Region	28 December 2025	Sagaing	23,874	5,966	3,559	3,964	4,949	4,253																																																				46,565
Sagaing Region	28 December 2025	Tamu	10,157	6,297																																																								16,454
Sagaing Region	28 December 2025	Monywa	26,026	14,329		9,432	7,563	11,742																																																				69,092
Sagaing Region	28 December 2025	Shwebo	4,299		2,057																																																							6,356
Sagaing Region	28 December 2025	Homalin	11,779			3,897																										16,522																												32,198
Sagaing Region	11 January 2026	Kalewa	2,784	1,651																																																								4,435
Sagaing Region	11 January 2026	Kyunhla	9,551	2,431	1,962																																																							13,944
Sagaing Region	11 January 2026	Myinmu	3,432		892	791	815	764																																																				6,694
Sagaing Region	11 January 2026	Chaung-U	2,981			1,087		1,316																																																			1,694	7,078
Sagaing Region	11 January 2026	Budalin	1,406			318																																																						1,724
Sagaing Region	11 January 2026	Ayadaw	2,146			712	642	676																																																				4,176
Sagaing Region	11 January 2026	Paungbyin	8,122	2,314																												813																												11,249
Sagaing Region	—	Mingin	Unopposed																																																									—
Sagaing Region	—	Wuntho	Unopposed																																																									—
Sagaing Region	—	Mawlaik	Unopposed																																																									—
Sagaing Region	—	Ye-U	Unopposed																																																									—
Sagaing Region	—	Kani	Unopposed																																																									—
Sagaing Region	—	Salingyi	Unopposed																																																									—
Sagaing Region	—	Htigyaing	Election not held																																																									
Sagaing Region	—	Banmauk	Election not held																																																									
Sagaing Region	—	Indaw	Election not held																																																									
Sagaing Region	—	Kawlin	Election not held																																																									
Sagaing Region	—	Pinlebu	Election not held																																																									
Sagaing Region	—	Myaung	Election not held																																																									
Sagaing Region	—	Pale	Election not held																																																									
Sagaing Region	—	Yinmabin	Election not held																																																									
Sagaing Region	—	Khin-U	Election not held																																																									
Sagaing Region	—	Tabayin	Election not held																																																									
Sagaing Region	—	Wetlet	Election not held																																																									
Sagaing Region	—	Taze	Election not held																																																									
Tanintharyi Region	28 December 2025	Kawthaung	18,234	6,676		3,310		5,486																																									6,097											39,803
Tanintharyi Region	28 December 2025	Dawei	21,457	5,742	5,351	3,390		4,110																																																				40,050
Tanintharyi Region	28 December 2025	Bokepyin	9,735	4,421	4,071			1,713																																																				19,940
Tanintharyi Region	28 December 2025	Myeik	29,893	20,286	27,011	8,513		10,719																																																				96,422
Tanintharyi Region	11 January 2026	Kyunsu	26,108	10,716	11,729			4,326																																																				52,879
Tanintharyi Region	11 January 2026	Tanintharyi	2,539	1,191	1,321			287																																																				5,338
Tanintharyi Region	25 January 2026	Thayetchaung	3,926			3,604																																																						7,530
Tanintharyi Region	25 January 2026	Palaw	7,686	4,691	3,278	1,139																																																						16,794
Tanintharyi Region	—	Yebyu	Unopposed																																																									—
Tanintharyi Region	—	Launglon	Unopposed																																																									—
Bago Region	28 December 2025	Nyaunglebin	23,021	10,370	11,428	5,775	4,490																																																					55,084
Bago Region	28 December 2025	Taungoo	37,471	9,475	7,283	5,253	4,590	10,624						4,765										3,623																																				83,084
Bago Region	28 December 2025	Nattalin	24,640	6,919		4,047	3,356							5,669																													9,087																	53,718
Bago Region	28 December 2025	Bago	80,137	25,230	18,504	11,671	9,878	11,254																																																			7,232	163,906
Bago Region	28 December 2025	Pyay	37,075	12,742	9,764	5,340	5,746	4,786						4,236										5,219																																			5,263	90,171
Bago Region	28 December 2025	Shwedaung	21,680	8,402	5,802	15,884	5,754	3,777						3,734																																														65,033
Bago Region	28 December 2025	Letpadan	20,919	11,282	5,948	6,259	5,540	6,038						5,004																																														60,990
Bago Region	28 December 2025	Tharrawaddy	29,443	10,218	4,167	10,197	3,723	3,500						5,164										3,157																																				69,569
Bago Region	11 January 2026	Daik-U	22,802	10,773	6,259	6,860		5,500						4,207																																													7,564	63,965
Bago Region	11 January 2026	Shwegyin	10,262	5,782	3,404		1,323																																																					20,771
Bago Region	11 January 2026	Htantabin	5,647	1,699	1,530	663																																																						9,539
Bago Region	11 January 2026	Yedashe	24,417	8,023	4,931		6,970	3,743																6,226																																				54,310
Bago Region	11 January 2026	Zigon	21,787	2,843	2,355	2,122	1,763	1,528						2,118																																														34,516
Bago Region	11 January 2026	Paungde	19,817	5,307		3,054	4,481	3,169						2,983																																														38,811
Bago Region	11 January 2026	Kawa	42,180	12,829	7,958	5,087	5,692	5,891						7,886																																														87,523
Bago Region	11 January 2026	Thanatpin	29,412	8,201	4,951	3,206	6,023	3,345																																																				55,138
Bago Region	11 January 2026	Paukkaung	22,570	2,027	788	695	594	738						727																																														28,139
Bago Region	11 January 2026	Pandaung	41,022	10,880	5,118	5,631	2,897	3,745						4,713																																														74,006
Bago Region	11 January 2026	Monyo	30,064	16,323		4,040	4,951	2,911						3,415																																													3,496	65,200
Bago Region	11 January 2026	Minhla	18,271	7,027		7,339	2,906	5,979						3,517																																														45,039
Bago Region	25 January 2026	Kyaukkyi	5,101	1,270				738																																																				7,109
Bago Region	25 January 2026	Kyauktaga	32,556	16,915	7,937	8,430	5,876																																																				7,391	79,105
Bago Region	25 January 2026	Pyu	18,102	5,094	3,993	4,352		2,464																																																				34,005
Bago Region	25 January 2026	Oktwin	20,593	6,351	7,654	3,000	2,259	3,619																																																			2,863	46,339
Bago Region	25 January 2026	Thegon	19,698	5,372	3,844	6,374	2,743	2,412						2,912										6,873																																				50,228
Bago Region	25 January 2026	Waw	38,895	12,459		4,400	8,036	6,019																																																				69,809
Bago Region	25 January 2026	Gyobingauk	15,773		3,456	2,701	2,914	2,299						9,137																																														36,280
Bago Region	25 January 2026	Okpho	14,736			3,200	4,562	3,376						3,955																																														29,829
Magway Region	28 December 2025	Chauk	10,374	4,137	4,357	4,831	3,232																																																					26,931
Magway Region	28 December 2025	Yenangyaung	13,397	5,223		2,963	3,387																																																					24,970
Magway Region	28 December 2025	Pakokku	25,006	15,430			9,860																																																					50,296
Magway Region	28 December 2025	Taungdwingyi	36,090	40,590		8,681		12,797																																																				98,158
Magway Region	28 December 2025	Magway	63,726	25,193	25,451	12,896	10,720																																																					137,986
Magway Region	28 December 2025	Pwintbyu	25,974	15,036	14,647																																																							55,657
Magway Region	28 December 2025	Minbu	35,427	12,158	8,845	4,693	5,997	4,381																																																				71,501
Magway Region	28 December 2025	Thayet	10,821	5,874	5,684			3,182																																																				25,561
Magway Region	28 December 2025	Aunglan	34,108	13,623	12,681			8,277																																																				68,689
Magway Region	11 January 2026	Seikphyu	6,186	1,891																																																								8,077
Magway Region	11 January 2026	Natmauk	11,422	10,319		5,205																																																						26,946
Magway Region	11 January 2026	Myothit	17,031	20,149	9,891	3,904	3,977																																																					54,952
Magway Region	11 January 2026	Ngape	10,155	6,743	5,042																																																							21,940
Magway Region	11 January 2026	Salin	10,585	4,753	3,056			4,007																																																				22,401
Magway Region	11 January 2026	Sidoktaya	7,064	7,590				3,429																																																				18,083
Magway Region	11 January 2026	Kamma	11,712	7,164	7,066																																																							25,942
Magway Region	11 January 2026	Mindon	4,891	3,492																																																								8,383
Magway Region	11 January 2026	Minhla	19,741	16,484																																																								36,225
Magway Region	11 January 2026	Sinbaungwe	15,039	13,370																																																								28,409
Magway Region	—	Gangaw	Unopposed																																																									—
Magway Region	—	Saw	Election not held																																																									
Magway Region	—	Tilin	Election not held																																																									
Magway Region	—	Pauk	Election not held																																																									
Magway Region	—	Myaing	Election not held																																																									
Magway Region	—	Yesagyo	Election not held																																																									
Mandalay Region	28 December 2025	Kyaukse	66,179	20,724	14,788	11,795	12,059	10,136																																																				135,681
Mandalay Region	28 December 2025	Nyaung-U	18,471	12,058	11,332	7,623																				6,652																																		56,136
Mandalay Region	28 December 2025	Pyinoolwin	66,343	14,401	11,806	9,807	11,687	6,815																																																				120,859
Mandalay Region	28 December 2025	Chanayethazan	21,159	8,624	11,257	7,847	5,050	4,542																																																			7,256	65,735
Mandalay Region	28 December 2025	Meiktila	77,841	16,428	12,067	13,694	8,208	10,322																																																				138,560
Mandalay Region	28 December 2025	Pyawbwe	65,453	17,159	11,849	8,802	6,937	13,775																																																				123,975
Mandalay Region	28 December 2025	Yamethin	51,936	19,305	9,956	6,191	6,843	15,670																		4,610																																		114,511
Mandalay Region	28 December 2025	Aungmyethazan	33,491	14,375	8,648	9,878	7,202	6,737																					4,723																															85,054
Mandalay Region	11 January 2026	Sintgaing	36,461	12,230	8,759	6,478	4,561	9,108																						8,299																														85,896
Mandalay Region	11 January 2026	Kyaukpadaung	33,266	14,963	12,548	9,049	9,142																			7,255																																		86,223
Mandalay Region	11 January 2026	Tada-U	14,098	7,362	4,025	3,285	2,026																																																					30,796
Mandalay Region	11 January 2026	Pyigyidagun	24,561	7,771	8,583	8,050	4,424	7,240																																																				60,629
Mandalay Region	11 January 2026	Maha Aungmye	29,416	14,044	11,434	9,006	6,808	6,703																																																				77,411
Mandalay Region	11 January 2026	Wundwin	35,903	20,002	12,405	18,172	6,381																							9,834																														102,697
Mandalay Region	11 January 2026	Thazi	49,492	15,841	8,650	7,669	4,892	15,056																																																				101,600
Mandalay Region	11 January 2026	Amarapura	50,409	15,405	10,477	9,176	5,441	7,674																					9,746																														13,022	121,350
Mandalay Region	11 January 2026	Madaya	14,186	7,671	3,651	3,035	2,973																																																					31,516
Mandalay Region	25 January 2026	Myittha	59,166	15,279	10,955	10,202	6,433	6,786																																																				108,821
Mandalay Region	25 January 2026	Nganzun	2,788	1,840		341																																																						4,969
Mandalay Region	25 January 2026	Chanmyathazi	37,323	14,608	9,077	9,549	7,516	6,662																																																				84,735
Mandalay Region	25 January 2026	Mahlaing	9,877	3,368	2,687	1,735	2,536																							1,822																														22,025
Mandalay Region	25 January 2026	Taungtha	3,788	2,086		1,232																																																						7,106
Mandalay Region	25 January 2026	Myingyan	28,922	13,639		10,920																																																						53,481
Mandalay Region	25 January 2026	Thabeikkyin	3,826	933	167	552	70																																																					5,548
Mandalay Region	25 January 2026	Patheingyi	43,541	23,800	10,628	11,822	9,041	7,632																					5,960																															112,424
Mandalay Region	—	Singu	Election not held																																																									
Mandalay Region	—	Mogok	Election not held																																																									
Mandalay Region	—	Natogyi	Election not held																																																									
Naypyidaw	28 December 2025	Zeyathiri	49,006	4,887	3,823	3,298	2,782	4,885																																																				68,681
Naypyidaw	28 December 2025	Pobbathiri	44,746	6,916	7,931	5,634	4,345	3,653																																																			2,953	76,178
Naypyidaw	28 December 2025	Zabuthiri	28,867	3,248	2,685	3,373	1,536	1,771																																																			6,011; 2,290	49,781
Naypyidaw	28 December 2025	Pyinmana	37,671	9,246	8,858	8,523	5,040	5,883																		4,597																																		79,818
Naypyidaw	28 December 2025	Dekkhinathiri	12,821	1,887	1,513	1,393	1,142	1,242																																																			1,815	21,813
Naypyidaw	28 December 2025	Lewe	57,323	25,205	12,840	9,538	6,530	11,300																																																			10,855	133,591
Naypyidaw	28 December 2025	Tatkon	57,491	16,070	10,093	10,107	5,690	10,580																																																				110,031
Naypyidaw	28 December 2025	Ottarathiri	24,770	5,179	3,062	3,438	1,279	2,817																																																				40,545
Mon State	28 December 2025	Kyaikto	10,616	5,855		2,800									4,071																																													23,342
Mon State	28 December 2025	Kyaikmaraw	10,679		2,160	1,028		541		4,464					2,183																																													21,055
Mon State	28 December 2025	Chaungzon	20,679			2,500				23,630					4,806																																													51,615
Mon State	28 December 2025	Mawlamyine	30,896	6,207	6,193	5,477	2,621	2,882		25,312					11,327																																													90,915
Mon State	28 December 2025	Thaton	19,793	6,346	4,238	2,934									6,359																																	6,210												45,880
Mon State	11 January 2026	Bilin	14,688	7,720	4,652	6,648									4,202																																													37,910
Mon State	11 January 2026	Mudon	13,477	2,102	2,041	1,100		1,091		31,944					3,597																																													55,352
Mon State	11 January 2026	Thanbyuzayat	12,744	2,621	2,334	1,371				22,275					3,810																																													45,155
Mon State	11 January 2026	Ye	6,524							11,729					2,430																																													20,683
Mon State	11 January 2026	Paung	23,231	6,431	4,961	4,551				26,432					6,141																																													71,747
Rakhine State	28 December 2025	Kyaukpyu	6,355																								4,364						2,306																											13,025
Rakhine State	28 December 2025	Sittwe	24,140																								7,118						4,514																				2,289		1,268		555			39,884
Rakhine State	28 December 2025	Manaung	9,589																								11,085						12,081																											32,755
Rakhine State	—	Ramree	Election not held																																																									
Rakhine State	—	Ann	Election not held																																																									
Rakhine State	—	Pauktaw	Election not held																																																									
Rakhine State	—	Ponnagyun	Election not held																																																									
Rakhine State	—	Rathedaung	Election not held																																																									
Rakhine State	—	Buthidaung	Election not held																																																									
Rakhine State	—	Maungdaw	Election not held																																																									
Rakhine State	—	Kyauktaw	Election not held																																																									
Rakhine State	—	Minbya	Election not held																																																									
Rakhine State	—	Myebon	Election not held																																																									
Rakhine State	—	Mrauk-U	Election not held																																																									
Rakhine State	—	Gwa	Election not held																																																									
Rakhine State	—	Taungup	Election not held																																																									
Rakhine State	—	Thandwe	Election not held																																																									
Yangon Region	28 December 2025	Kamayut	5,551	2,029	1,807	1,785	997	1,587																																																				13,756
Yangon Region	28 December 2025	Kyauktada	3,523		821	681	551	485																																																			715; 364	7,140
Yangon Region	28 December 2025	Taikkyi	49,190	16,274	11,543	6,357	8,403	6,047															5,629		5,370									9,735	7,377	7,197																								133,122
Yangon Region	28 December 2025	Twante	45,438		6,657	8,249	5,244	6,486				28,733											5,209																																				8,653	114,669
Yangon Region	28 December 2025	South Dagon	29,502	6,711	9,696	11,543	3,896	3,985														3,758	4,052		5,247																																		5,108	83,498
Yangon Region	28 December 2025	Botataung	8,675		2,475	1,992	1,923																																																					15,065
Yangon Region	28 December 2025	Mayangon	19,387	3,236	3,796	4,292	2,308																1,909																												1,699								6,347	42,974
Yangon Region	28 December 2025	Mingaladon	54,346	7,801	11,215	10,260	3,455	3,829																													6,665							2,019															4,981	104,571
Yangon Region	28 December 2025	Hmawbi	52,843	17,219	11,121	10,048	6,451																		7,643																									5,696									5,599	116,620
Yangon Region	28 December 2025	Thingangyun	14,484	3,020	4,283	5,578	2,188																														6,060																						4,895; 3,231; 2,958	46,697
Yangon Region	28 December 2025	Thanlyin	49,731	12,104	13,499	16,656	10,057															7,053													5,740																									114,840
Yangon Region	28 December 2025	Ahlon	3,263	1,744	1,341	991																																																					2,656	9,995
Yangon Region	11 January 2026	Bahan	8,249	2,463	3,173	2,073	1,510																1,403																																				2,782	21,653
Yangon Region	11 January 2026	Pabedan	4,510	903	1,564	1,085	777																																																					8,839
Yangon Region	11 January 2026	Latha	2,150	1,557		1,072		598																																																			1,396	6,773
Yangon Region	11 January 2026	Kawhmu	30,623		12,991	4,080	4,787	3,799															3,426																																					59,706
Yangon Region	11 January 2026	Kungyangon	27,704		5,560	4,640	4,629	7,141				11,688																																																61,362
Yangon Region	11 January 2026	North Dagon	14,166	4,523	5,659	3,698	2,627	1,725															1,483															1,312																					4,717	39,910
Yangon Region	11 January 2026	Dawbon	8,412	2,217	2,493	1,710	1,352																																																				6,520	22,704
Yangon Region	11 January 2026	Pazundaung	4,809	3,504	1,778	1,705																																																						11,796
Yangon Region	11 January 2026	Hlaing	12,707	3,981	4,533	5,520	1,790	2,222																																																			3,627	34,380
Yangon Region	11 January 2026	Shwepyitha	40,347		11,805	10,167	4,972	5,750																														5,413						4,638															10,266; 5,411	98,769
Yangon Region	11 January 2026	Htantabin	42,024		9,176	4,934	3,022	2,447				15,541													3,156											4,235																								84,535
Yangon Region	11 January 2026	Hlegu	75,719	9,879	8,760	7,165	5,003	5,950																																																			12,432; 3,602	128,510
Yangon Region	11 January 2026	South Okkalapa	16,988	4,788	5,664	3,671	2,266																											3,974																									4,243	41,594
Yangon Region	11 January 2026	Cocokyun	1,487			37																																																						1,524
Yangon Region	11 January 2026	Kyimyindaing	4,756	1,246	1,522	906	2,194																																					621															14,396	25,641
Yangon Region	11 January 2026	Insein	28,203	5,309	5,542	5,875	4,767	2,294				11,459										3,314																													3,728								2,335	72,826
Yangon Region	25 January 2026	Dagon	6,106	833	929	607	491	358																																																				9,324
Yangon Region	25 January 2026	Lanmadaw	3,765	1,723	2,920	824																																																						9,232
Yangon Region	25 January 2026	Seikkyi Kanaungto	7,133		1,406	856	837	638				2,135																								2,741																								15,746
Yangon Region	25 January 2026	Dala	29,970	3,740	4,256	2,631	2,285	1,778				11,192																																																55,852
Yangon Region	25 January 2026	Dagon Seikkan	22,997	6,923	6,177	4,089	3,538	8,698																																												3,186								55,608
Yangon Region	25 January 2026	East Dagon	23,108	6,108	5,991	5,867	2,704	2,485																	3,586													5,263																						55,112
Yangon Region	25 January 2026	Mingala Taungnyunt	13,903	2,741	6,246		2,198	2,729															2,138											1,993																										31,948
Yangon Region	25 January 2026	Thaketa	24,196	7,114	7,238	5,480	4,722	4,768																																																			8,833	62,351
Yangon Region	25 January 2026	North Okkalapa	29,511	8,308	11,398	8,947		10,454																																																			13,353	81,971
Yangon Region	25 January 2026	Tamwe	14,785	3,282	4,937	2,365		2,066														2,338												1,666																										31,439
Yangon Region	25 January 2026	Yankin	7,992	1,995	3,273	1,297	1,583																																																				5,775	21,915
Yangon Region	25 January 2026	Kyauktan	45,668	13,230	13,156	12,318	13,425																																																					97,797
Yangon Region	25 January 2026	Kayan	47,578	21,862	15,609	8,427																																																						93,476
Yangon Region	25 January 2026	Thongwa	40,879	22,132	12,125	8,128	10,592																																																					93,856
Yangon Region	25 January 2026	Sanchaung	8,746		4,397		3,188															3,242																																						19,573
Yangon Region	25 January 2026	Hlaingthaya West	18,665	5,364	5,448	3,752	2,213					11,965										3,370													3,650																									54,427
Yangon Region	25 January 2026	Hlaingthaya East	17,373	5,831	3,044	2,503	2,296					8,170										2,382																																					2,720	44,319
Shan State	28 December 2025	Pindaya	22,412			4,843							19,867																																															47,122
Shan State	28 December 2025	Hopong	8,981			3,039			34,410																																																			46,430
Shan State	28 December 2025	Nawnghkio	22,104	5,620	4,905	1,748	4,092						10,163																																															48,632
Shan State	28 December 2025	Kengtung	33,414	4,654	3,486	2,375	9,878																																																					53,807
Shan State	28 December 2025	Tachileik	30,477	8,856			20,515																																																					59,848
Shan State	28 December 2025	Taunggyi	52,437	10,121	7,673	9,137	11,170	12,138	68,791																																					4,130													8,764	184,361
Shan State	28 December 2025	Nansang	23,128	2,105		1,529	10,207		3,609																																																			40,578
Shan State	28 December 2025	Mu Se	12,961				11,631																																																					24,592
Shan State	28 December 2025	Mong Hsat	29,491	3,965			4,937																																																					38,393
Shan State	28 December 2025	Lashio	19,584	5,150		1,830	6,821																																							2,232														35,617
Shan State	28 December 2025	Langkho	8,632				9,733																																																					18,365
Shan State	28 December 2025	Loilen	8,972	1,510			8,431		16,266																																																		832	36,011
Shan State	11 January 2026	Ywangan	13,214	4,199		2,531							30,312																																															50,256
Shan State	11 January 2026	Hsi Hseng	9,053			4,530			50,215																																																			63,798
Shan State	11 January 2026	Kalaw	36,826			8,476	11,413	14,313	34,444																																																			105,472
Shan State	11 January 2026	Mong Khet	8,588			1,592	1,892																																																					12,072
Shan State	11 January 2026	Mong Ping	20,659				4,565																																																					25,224
Shan State	11 January 2026	Mong Hpayak	13,296	1,055		508	2,626																																																					17,485
Shan State	11 January 2026	Lawksawk	42,371						15,418				21,123																																															78,912
Shan State	11 January 2026	Tangyan	20,596				11,191																																								6,303													38,090
Shan State	11 January 2026	Mongyai	10,607				5,398																																																					16,005
Shan State	11 January 2026	Kunhing	8,435				9,371																																																					17,806
Shan State	11 January 2026	Mong Ton	22,398				5,130																																																					27,528
Shan State	11 January 2026	Mong Yawng	12,404	1,970		898	6,464																																																					21,736
Shan State	11 January 2026	Mong Yang	4,211				866																																																					5,077
Shan State	11 January 2026	Mong Pan	5,342				4,359																																																					9,701
Shan State	11 January 2026	Mawkmai	7,024				1,312		5,700																																																			14,036
Shan State	11 January 2026	Mong Kung	9,577				12,377																																																					21,954
Shan State	11 January 2026	Lai-Hka	4,662	1,655			8,830																																																					15,147
Shan State	25 January 2026	Pinlaung	16,556			2,955	5,427		79,978																																																			104,916
Shan State	25 January 2026	Nyaungshwe	17,895		4,893	2,438	6,091	3,104	22,500								44,037																																											100,958
Shan State	25 January 2026	Kyaukme	9,560				5,999																																																					15,559
Shan State	25 January 2026	Hsipaw	7,235				9,613																																																					16,848
Shan State	25 January 2026	Mong Hsu	9,047				7,914																																																					16,961
Shan State	25 January 2026	Kyethi	9,180				11,028																																																					20,208
Shan State	—	Mong Nai					Unopposed																																																					—
Shan State	—	Matman	Unopposed																																																									—
Shan State	—	Pekon	Unopposed																																																									—
Shan State	—	Laukkaing	Election not held																																																									
Shan State	—	Namtu	Election not held																																																									
Shan State	—	Mantong	Election not held																																																									
Shan State	—	Mong La	Election not held																																																									
Shan State	—	Kutkai	Election not held																																																									
Shan State	—	Namhkam	Election not held																																																									
Shan State	—	Mabein	Election not held																																																									
Shan State	—	Mongmit	Election not held																																																									
Shan State	—	Pangsang	Election not held																																																									
Shan State	—	Namphan	Election not held																																																									
Shan State	—	Hsenwi	Election not held																																																									
Shan State	—	Kunlong	Election not held																																																									
Shan State	—	Konkyan	Election not held																																																									
Shan State	—	Namhsan	Election not held																																																									
Shan State	—	Hopang	Election not held																																																									
Shan State	—	Mongmao	Election not held																																																									
Shan State	—	Pangwaun	Election not held																																																									
Ayeyarwady Region	28 December 2025	Kyonpyaw	39,472	10,751	13,365	7,241	4,055	6,726			18,891																				8,169																													108,670
Ayeyarwady Region	28 December 2025	Pathein	57,206	13,198	11,251	15,391	5,827	6,804			12,965																				8,372																												8,012; 4,027	143,053
Ayeyarwady Region	28 December 2025	Maubin	82,966	14,682	17,997	6,743	6,982	7,046													8,678																																							145,094
Ayeyarwady Region	28 December 2025	Myaungmya	50,502	19,251	9,099	13,721	9,813	8,708			28,495																																																	139,589
Ayeyarwady Region	28 December 2025	Kyangin	14,920	17,695	9,277	4,803																																																						46,695
Ayeyarwady Region	28 December 2025	Myanaung	43,844	24,007	16,804	17,662																																																						102,317
Ayeyarwady Region	28 December 2025	Labutta	48,276	23,442	10,770	7,836	5,052	7,752			9,131																																																	112,259
Ayeyarwady Region	28 December 2025	Hinthada	56,976	24,121	17,254	10,626	6,186	9,292			10,774																																																	135,229
Ayeyarwady Region	11 January 2026	Kyaunggon	43,471	18,503		7,135		15,150																																																				84,259
Ayeyarwady Region	11 January 2026	Kangyidaunt	37,806	8,634	3,390	3,783	3,777	8,078			18,652										1,737										3,277																													89,134
Ayeyarwady Region	11 January 2026	Thabaung	29,502	15,550	9,843	6,286	4,794	10,333																																																				76,308
Ayeyarwady Region	11 January 2026	Kyaiklat	43,635	15,832	14,785	9,052	6,181	8,527																																																				98,012
Ayeyarwady Region	11 January 2026	Pyapon	49,189	12,672	10,567	9,591	4,822	8,780																																																			14,935	110,556
Ayeyarwady Region	11 January 2026	Bogale	62,412	29,257		11,692		14,570													9,551																																							127,482
Ayeyarwady Region	11 January 2026	Pantanaw	51,418	24,876	20,023	9,588	7,546	8,613																																																				122,064
Ayeyarwady Region	11 January 2026	Wakema	41,359	26,884	8,933	9,383	4,463	5,016			25,897										6,155																																							128,090
Ayeyarwady Region	11 January 2026	Einme	36,359	21,754	8,356	9,867	5,239	7,529																																																			9,588	98,692
Ayeyarwady Region	25 January 2026	Yekyi	42,564	9,536	5,801	4,277		4,843																																																			22,800	89,821
Ayeyarwady Region	25 January 2026	Ngapudaw	48,225	21,358		10,141	8,958	16,596																																																				105,278
Ayeyarwady Region	25 January 2026	Dedaye	46,029	12,937	11,713	4,907	4,119	6,309																																																			6,507	92,521
Ayeyarwady Region	25 January 2026	Nyaungdon	44,896	19,451	17,340	11,829	8,156	8,059																																																				109,731
Ayeyarwady Region	25 January 2026	Danubyu	32,215	12,806	22,233	5,529	6,417	7,132																																																				86,332
Ayeyarwady Region	25 January 2026	Ingapu	49,178	18,559	15,720	11,977		10,902																																																				106,336
Ayeyarwady Region	25 January 2026	Mawlamyinegyun	64,091	21,794	10,578	10,699	7,182	11,192																																																				125,536
Ayeyarwady Region	25 January 2026	Zalun	34,265	15,530	14,504	8,482		6,166																																																				78,947
Ayeyarwady Region	25 January 2026	Lemyethna	15,011	2,538	7,474	1,325	1,383																																																					27,731
Total			5,753,096	1,744,943	1,149,720	1,000,815	802,414	691,628	331,331	145,786	124,805	100,883	81,465	74,142	48,926	48,702	44,037	33,772	32,386	29,375	26,121	25,457	25,249	25,098	25,002	23,114	22,567	21,765	20,429	19,955	19,818	19,564	18,901	17,368	16,767	14,173	12,725	11,988	10,960	10,613	9,225	9,211	9,087	7,278	6,786	6,362	6,303	6,210	6,097	5,696	5,427	3,186	2,289	1,633	1,268	1,206	555	231	281,202	13,016,995

=== Amyotha Hluttaw ===
2026 Myanmar general election

=== Pyithu Hluttaw ===
2026 Myanmar general election

== History ==
In August 1988 Ne Win's one party rule system – the Burma Socialist Programme Party (BSPP) (မြန်မာ့ဆိုရှယ်လစ် လမ်းစဉ်)– collapsed in August 1988 following the 8888 Uprising, In September that year, the military staged coup d'etat under the guise of intending to hold "free and fair" elections in 1990. The first elections to the lower house (the Pyithu Hluttaw or "People's Assembly") under the new military administration, dubbed the State Law and Order Restoration Council (SLORC), were held on 27 May 1990.

The major opposition party, the National League for Democracy, achieved a landslide victory with a majority of 392 out of the 492 seats; under the parliamentary system, the NLD should have formed the new government, however, the SLORC refused to acknowledge the results, and thus the People's Assembly never convened.

The military junta placed the leader of the NLD, Aung San Suu Kyi, under house arrest following her party's victory. The SLORC was abolished in November 1997 and resurfaced as the State Peace and Development Council (SPDC). In August 2003, Prime Minister Khin Nyunt announced a seven-step "roadmap to democracy", which the government was reportedly implementing. The plan did not include a timetable and no independent mechanism for verifying its progress and results.

On 7 February 2008, SPDC announced that a referendum for the new constitution would be held in May that year, and a multi-party elections in 2010. The constitutional referendum was held on 10 May. The first general elections in 20 years were held in November 2010, completing the fifth step of the government's roadmap to democracy. The NLD was executed from participating in these elections as the Election Commission declared them "null and void" in accordance with election laws. The NLD, was however, allowed to participate in the 2012 by-elections that followed, and Suu Kyi – released from house arrest in 2010 – won a seat in the Pyithu Hluttaw.

In the 2015 general election, the National League for Democracy won an absolute majority of seats, taking 86 percent of the seats in the Assembly of the Union well over the 67 percent supermajority needed to ensure that its preferred candidates will be elected president and first vice president.

In the 2020 elections, the NLD won 920 of the total 1,117 seats, which was met with claims of fraud from USDP and the military. As a result of widespread investigations and civil unrest, a second coup d'etat occurred in February 2021, and a state of emergency rule was declared. This state of emergency was extended twice, and as of February 2023, is meant to end in August 2023.

In the 2026 elections, the USDP won a majority of the seats.. The German government posited that the junta's moves threaten to escalate violence in the country, and further destabilise the country.
