= 2025–26 Myanmar general election =

- 28 December 2025 (first phase); 11 January 2026 (second phase); 25 January 2026 (third phase)

264 of the 440 seats in the Pyithu Hluttaw 221 seats needed for a majority 157 of the 224 seats in the Amyotha Hluttaw 113 seats needed for a majority
- Turnout: 52% (first phase); 55% (second phase); 56% (third phase)
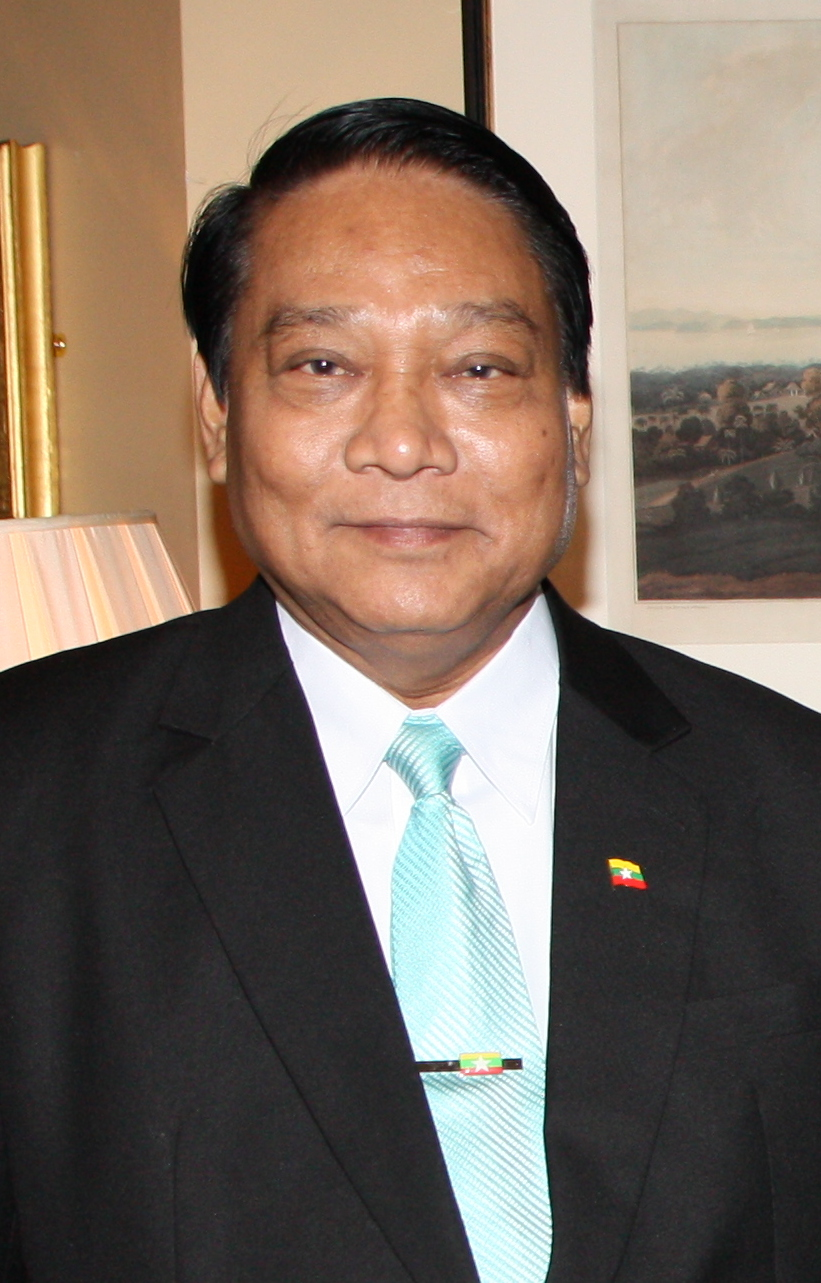
	First party
Leader	Khin Yi
Party	USDP
Leader since	5 October 2022
Leader's seat	Zeyathiri (Note: Not the incumbent but stood for this seat and won)
Last election	26 R / 7 N
Seats won	231 R / 108 N
Seat change	▲205 R / ▲101 N
President before election
Min Aung Hlaing (acting)
Military
President after election
Min Aung Hlaing
Independent (USDP)

General elections were held in Myanmar for elected seats in the Amyotha Hluttaw and the Pyithu Hluttaw of the Pyidaungsu Hluttaw in three phases, beginning on 28 December 2025 and concluding on 25 January 2026. The election was held by Myanmar's military junta that came to power after the 2021 military coup d'état. Though military ruler Min Aung Hlaing initially promised to hold the election by August 2023, the military repeatedly delayed the election in the face of increasing violence.

Following the coup, the military ruled the country under a state of emergency, initially declared by Acting President Myint Swe for one year and extended seven times by six-month periods, which expired on 31 July 2025. The constitution requires elections be held within six months of the end of the state of emergency. Min Aung Hlaing provided different time frames for the election three times before the December date was confirmed. The election was expected to be a sham process intended to legitimize continued military rule. A census used for the election was conducted in October 2024.

In January 2023, the military enacted a new electoral law tightening the requirements for party registration, banning the participation of people convicted of a crime including Aung San Suu Kyi and Win Myint, and switching from a first-past-the-post to a mixed-member proportional system for the Amyotha Hluttaw election. Analysts see the changes as intended to improve the electoral performance of the military proxy Union Solidarity and Development Party, which performed poorly in the free and fair 2020 election. Most opposition to the USDP will be seriously weakened under the new rules. Added to the previously existing 25% reserved seats to the military, the switch to proportional representation would allow it to govern with a lower share of the popular vote. The National League for Democracy (NLD), which was removed from power in the coup, announced in February 2023 that it would not register under the new law, and was declared dissolved by the Union Election Commission (UEC) the following month. The second-largest opposition party, the Shan Nationalities League for Democracy (SNDP), similarly announced it would not participate in the election. Partial official results for began to be released in January by the UEC, with an overwhelming majority of seats won by the USDP.

== Background ==
For most of its independent history, Myanmar, formerly known as Burma, has been ruled by the Tatmadaw. Initially, under Ne Win and his Burma Socialist Programme Party, followed by a military junta. Myanmar entered a semi-democratic state in the early 2010s, which culminated in the 2015 elections, in which democracy leader Aung San Suu Kyi was elected State Counsellor and her party, the National League for Democracy, won a resounding victory.

=== 2020 election performance ===
Min Aung Hlaing openly questioned the validity of the 2020 election on the eve of the November election. After casting his ballot, he vowed to accept the election results. The Tatmadaw (military)-backed Union Solidarity and Development Party (USDP) lost more seats in both chambers of the national legislature against the NLD, which won another landslide victory in the 2020 general elections. Election results were regarded as credible by both domestic and foreign observers, who found no significant anomalies.

Nonetheless, the military claimed the vote was fraudulent, citing 8.6 million irregularities in voter lists. Unable to support the military's claims, the Union Election Commission dismissed the military's fraud accusations on 28 January 2021.

=== 2021 military coup ===
The military initiated a coup on 1 February 2021. Suu Kyi, President Win Myint, and other important people were taken into custody. After assuming power, Senior General Min Aung Hlaing established a junta known as the State Administration Council (SAC). A one-year state of emergency was proclaimed, and Myint Swe was named interim president. With the ultimate objective of holding "a free and fair multiparty democracy election," the SAC unveiled a five-point roadmap in late February.

Aung San Suu Kyi received a number of frivolous charges, including breaching emergency COVID-19 laws, illegally importing and using walkie-talkies, violating the National Disaster Law, violating communications laws, inciting public unrest, and violating the official secrets act. On 6 December 2021, she was sentenced to four years in prison, but Min Aung Hlaing commuted her sentence to two years. Her conviction complicates her ability to hold public office.

On 1 August 2021, Min Aung Hlaing formed a caretaker government, and declared himself Prime Minister, whilst remaining the Chairman of the SAC.

The Tatmadaw originally promised to hold the elections when the state of emergency expired on 1 February 2022, but pushed back the elections first to 2023, and then delayed them indefinitely.

=== Dissolution of the NLD ===
On 21 May 2021, the junta-appointed Union Election Commission announced plans to permanently dissolve the National League for Democracy. NLD offices were occupied and raided by police authorities, starting on 2 February. Documents, computers and laptops were forcibly seized, and the NLD called these raids unlawful. On 9 February, police raided the NLD headquarters in Yangon. Aung San Suu Kyi has commented on the possibility of her party's forced dissolution saying, "Our party grew out of the people so it will exist as long as people support it."

In January 2022, the junta reversed its plan to dissolve the NLD, with spokesman Zaw Min Tun saying that the NLD will decide whether to stand in the 2023 election. In February 2023, the NLD announced it would not re-register as a political party under a strict new electoral law enacted by the junta the previous month. The electoral commission automatically disbanded NLD, along with 39 other parties, on 28 March 2023.

== Electoral system ==
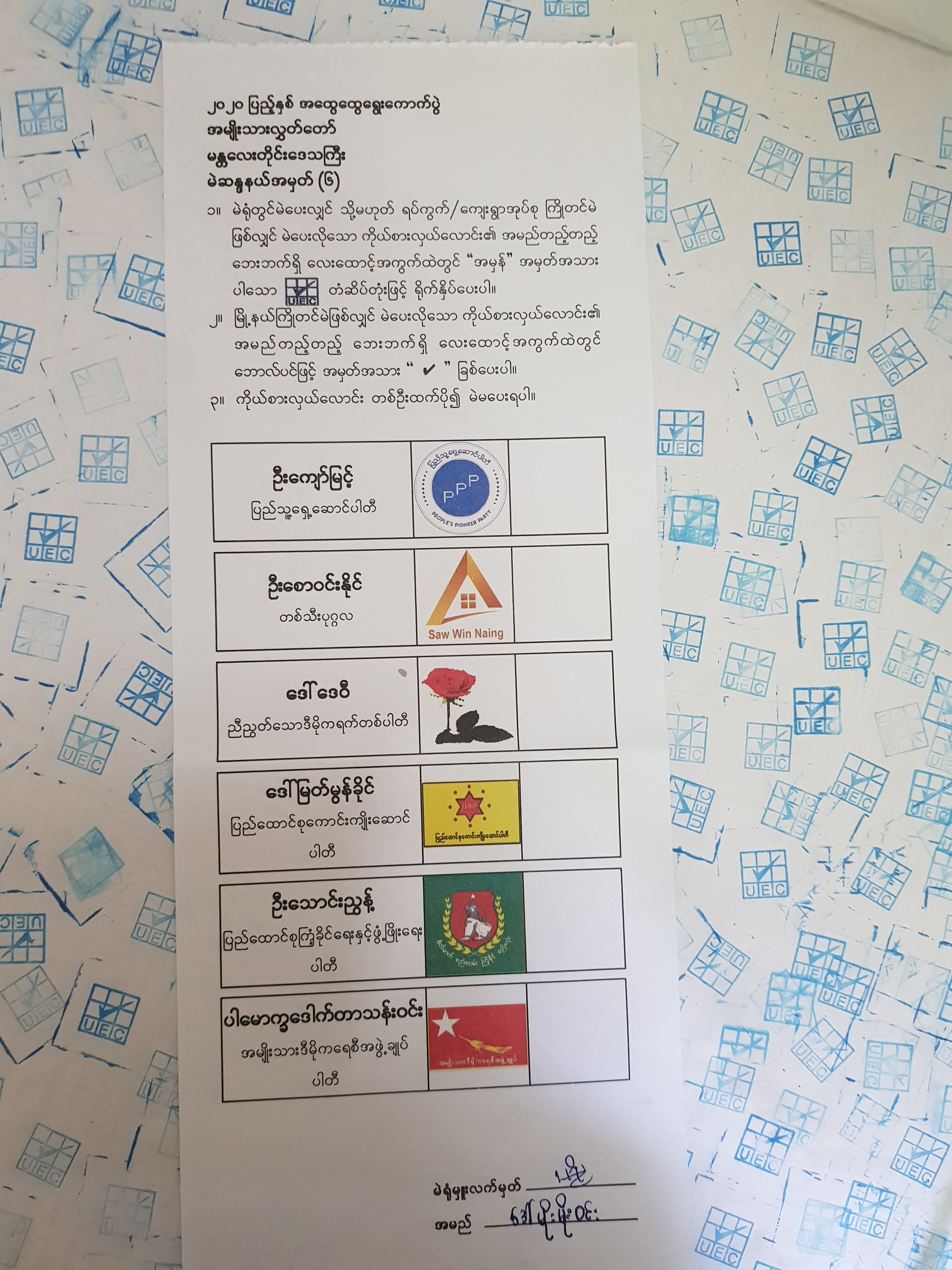
A ballot paper in 2020

Prior to 2022, Myanmar only used the first-past-the-post system, which allows a candidate to win an election with a plurality of votes in a constituency. However, on 16 June 2022 during a press conference in Naypyidaw, Khin Maung Oo, a member of the Union Election Commission, announced that the nation would switch to a proportional representation system for the upcoming election.

=== Existing system ===
In the existing system, the national legislature, the Pyidaungsu Hluttaw, consists of 498 seats elected in single-member constituencies, and 166 seats reserved for military appointees.

The Pyithu Hluttaw is elected every five years. It is the lower house. It has 440 MPs, 330 of which are elected in single-member constituencies, one for each township. A further 110 members (one quarter) are appointed by the Tatmadaw.

The Amyotha Hluttaw is elected every five years. It is the upper house. It has 224 MPs, 168 of which are elected in single-member constituencies, 12 in each state or region. A further 56 members (one quarter) are appointed by the Tatmadaw.

In Myanmar, it is not uncommon for elections to be cancelled partially or completely in some constituencies due to insurrection.

Following the inauguration of the new lawmakers, the President and the two Vice-Presidents of Myanmar are chosen by the Presidential Electoral College, which is composed of MPs from three committees: one consisting of elected members from each house of the Pyidaungsu Hluttaw and one consisting of members appointed by the military. After one candidate has been recommended by each committee, the Assembly votes. Depending on their total number of votes, the candidates are elected to the following positions: President, First Vice-President, and Second Vice-President.

Under Article 59(f) of the 2008 Constitution, individuals are disqualified from the presidency if they, their parents, spouse, or children "owe allegiance to a foreign power." As Aung San Suu Kyi’s late husband and two children are British citizens, this provision rendered her ineligible for the office.

Critics and members of the National League for Democracy (NLD) have characterized this clause as a specific measure designed by the former military junta to prevent her from holding the presidency. Following the NLD's victory in the 2015 Myanmar general election, the party created the post of State Counsellor of Myanmar for Aung San Suu Kyi, allowing her to function as the de facto head of government. During this period, President Win Myint (and his predecessor Htin Kyaw) maintained a close working relationship with Aung San Suu Kyi. Although constitutional authority rested with the President, it was widely acknowledged by observers and the NLD itself that Aung San Suu Kyi exercised primary leadership over the executive branch.

=== Revisions to the existing system ===
In December 2021, the junta-appointed Union Electoral Commission convened with 60 political parties on the electoral system. The cohort determined that it would be advisable to switch to a system of party-list proportional representation (PR). The largest remainder method will be used, and the lists will be closed, although there may be a switch to open lists "when the level of education of the electorate and the political tide rises". The townships will be merged into districts for constituencies.

Observers and anti-junta factions have criticised the change in the electoral system as politically motivated, aimed at increasing the junta's electoral performance. In 2014, the Amyotha Hluttaw had previously approved a switch to the PR system, but it was not pursued further by the Pyithu Hluttaw for being "unconstitutional." The PR system also implies larger multi-member constituencies, which could enable the military to avoid having to cancel elections in insecure regions.

On 26 January 2023, the military junta issued the Political Parties Registration Law to force political parties to re-register within 60 days, or face automatic dissolution. The law also introduced new financial (possessing at least US$35,000 (equivalent to $36,984 in 2025) in funds), party membership (having 100,000 members, an increase from 1,000), and logistical requirements (contesting half of all constituencies and operating party offices in half of all townships), effectively aimed at limiting electoral participation to few national parties like the USDP. The NLD, SNLD, and 38 other parties were disbanded by the law on 28 March.

System method	Pyithu Hluttaw	Amyotha Hluttaw	The State and Region Hluttaws	The ethnic constituencies for State and Region Hluttaws
FPTP	330	84	322	29
PR	—N/a	84	42	—N/a
Total	330 (75%)	168 (75%)	364 (74,6%)	29
Military appointed	110 (25%)	56 (25%)	~124 (25,4%)	—N/a
Total	440	224	~488	—N/a

== Conduct ==
The election is expected by independent analysts and foreign bodies, including those at the United Nations, Human Rights Watch, and the US State Department, to be neither free nor fair, and rather a sham process intended to legitimise further military rule.

The Union Election Commission (UEC) organises and oversees in Myanmar. During the 2021 coup, Hla Thein, the civilian-appointed UEC chair, was arrested by military authorities and subsequently sentenced to prison. The military junta replaced him with Thein Soe, a former military general who had previously overseen the 2010 Myanmar general election. Some have expressed concerns about the Tatmadaw's willingness to hold free and fair elections.

Although the past three elections in Myanmar have been semi-free, there have been concerns over such things as irregularities in voter lists, misinformation, fake news, and the vilification of Burmese Muslims. In addition, under the military-designed 2008 Constitution, the military is effectively guaranteed one vice presidency, and a quarter of the seats in both chambers of the Pyidaungsu Hluttaw, veto power over voter-elected legislators, as well as a third of the seats in all state and regional Hluttaws, and key ministries.

Some members of the NLD dominated Pyidaungsu Hluttaw elected in 2020 have formed an anti-cabinet known as the National Unity Government of Myanmar. The NUG claims to be the legitimate government of Myanmar, and the junta and the NUG consider each other terrorist groups. The coup has since escalated into a Myanmar civil war (2021–present) between the Armed Forces, and the NUG's People's Defence Force and ethnic armed organisations (EAOs), resulting in thousands of military and civilian casualties, and the displacement of an additional 1.7 million people as of November 2022. This, along with ongoing ethnic conflicts, means the vote will likely be cancelled in some constituencies, and may not be secure in others.

The planned election may trigger an escalation in violence, due to widespread public opposition. Since January 2023, resistance forces have attacked and killed individuals associated with the planned election, including local administrators gathering data for voter lists. On 29 January, the NUG declared that individuals cooperating with the election would be deemed "accomplices of high treason." Major EAOs, including the Chin National Front, Karenni National Progressive Party, Karen National Union, Kachin Independence Organisation, and the Ta-ang National Liberation Army, have also criticised the planned election.

According to state media, India will send teams to monitor the election.

More than 4,800 candidates are competing for seats in the national and regional legislatures. At least six of the likely USDP candidates are currently-serving Tatmadaw lieutenant-generals.

On 26 November 2025, 8,865 people were pardoned or had their sentence commuted by the junta; 3,085 of which were convicted under the Section 505A "fake news" penal code. According to junta spokesperson, Zaw Min Tun, these commutations would allow eligible voters to participate "freely and fairly."

The conduct in Karenni State of the election has reportedly been restless and seen forced voting.

== Timing ==
The Constitution requires that elections be held within six months of the end of a declared state of emergency, which the military has extended repeatedly since the 2021 coup.

In 2021, Min Aung Hlaing initially promised an election by August 2023, saying one would be held "without fail". This was the latest date that would have been allowed under the constitutional rule stating two six month extensions of the state of emergency are "normally" allowed. However, the election was not held and the state of emergency was repeatedly extended past the two-extension limit. In 2024, Min Aung Hlaing announced that a census would be held between 1 and 15 October and promised to hold the election in 2025. The census began as scheduled on 1 October. During a visit in Belarus on 8 March 2025, Min Aung Hlaing announced that the election will be conducted around December 2025 or January 2026. On 26 March, state media reported that at a meeting of the State Administration Council, Min Aung Hlaing set a plan for the election to be held either in the last two weeks of December or in the first two weeks of January. On 27 March, in a speech for Armed Forces Day, Min Aung Hlaing appeared to narrow the date to December. Despite the highly destabilising 2025 Myanmar earthquake that occurred the next day, Min Aung Hlaing said on 3 April that the timeline for the election would not change.

In addition to ongoing security concerns, the election date may have also been delayed to forestall infighting within the Burmese military leadership around succession planning. It remains unclear if Min Aung Hlaing will remain commander-in-chief or seek the presidency, and whether he can appoint a loyal candidate to either role, since the Constitution does not permit him to assume both.

On 18 August 2025, the UEC announced that the election would be held in stages beginning on 28 December 2025.

On 11 September 2025, an official from the UEC announced that the results will be announced by the end of January 2026.

=== Phase 1 ===
On 20 August, the UEC announced designated phase one constitutuencies consisting of 102 townships to be held on 28 December. 121 constituencies, including 56 townships will be excluded.

States/Region	Townships
Ayeyarwady	8: Kyonpyaw; Pathein; Maubin; Myaungmya; Kyangin; Myanaung; Labutta; Hinthada
Bago	8: Nyaunglebin; Taungoo; Nattalin; Bago; Pyay; Shwedaung; Letpadan; Thayawady
Chin	2: Tiddim; Haka
Kachin	6: Tanai; Khaunglanphu; Nagmon; PutaO; Moenyin; Myitkyina
Kayah	2: Bawlakhe; Loikaw
Kayin	3: Hpa-an; Myawady; Thantaunggyi
Magway	9: Chauk; Yenangyoung; Pakokku; Taungdwingyi; Magway; Pwintbyu; Minbu; Thayet; Aunglan
Mandalay	8: Kyaukse; NyaungU; PyinOoLwin; Chanayethazan; Meiktila; Pyawbwe; Yamethin; Aungmyaythazan
Mon	5: Kyaikto; Kyaikmaraw; Chaungzon; Mawlamyine; Thaton
Rakhine	3: Kyaukpyu; Sittway; Manaung
Sagaing	12: Leshi; Lahe; Nanyun; Kalay; Katha; Kanbalu; Hkamti; Sagaing; Tamu; Monywa; Shwebo; Homalin
Shan	12: Pindaya; Hopong; Nawnghkio; Kengtung; Tachilek; Taunggyi; Namhsan; Muse; Monghsat; Lashio; Langhko; Loilem
Tanintharyi	4: Kawthaung; Dawei; Bokpyin; Myeik
Yangon	12: Kamayut; Kyauktada; Taikkyi; Twantay; Dagon Myothit (South); Botahtaung; Mayangon; Mingaladon; Hmawby; Thingangyun; Thanlyin; Ahlon
Naypyidaw (Capital)	8: Zeyathiri; Pobbathiri; Zabuthiri; Pyinmana; Dakkhinathiri; Lewe; Tatkon; Ottarathiri
Total	102

=== Phase 2 ===
On 28 October, the UEC announced designated phase two constitutuencies consisting of 100 townships to be held on 11 January 2026.

States/Region	Townships
Ayeyarwady	9: Kyaunggon; Kangyidaunt; Thaboung; KyaikLat; Pyapon; Bogalay; Pantanaw; Wakema; Einme
Bago	12: DaikU; Shwegyin; Htantabin; Yedashe; Zeegon; Paungde; Kawa; Thanatpin; Paukkaung; Wakema; Monyo; Minhla
Kachin	3: Machanbaw; Mogaung; Waingmaw
Kayin	2: Papun; Hlaingbwe
Kayah	2: Dimawhso; Prusho
Magway	11: Gangaw; Seikpyu; Natmauk; Myothit; Ngaphe; Salin; Sedoktara; Kanma; Mindon; Minhla; Sinpaungwae
Mandalay	9: Singaing; Kyaukpadaung; TadaU; Pyigyidagun; Mahaaungmyae; Wundwin; Thazi; Amarapura; Madaya
Mon	5: Bilin; Mudon; Thanbyuzayat; Ye; Paung
Sagaing	11: Kalewa; Mingin; Wuntho; Kyunhla; Myinmu; ChaungU; Budalin; Ayadaw; Phaungpyin; Mawlaik; YeU
Shan	17: Ywangan; Sesaing; Kalaw; Monghkat; Mongping; Mongphyat; Yaksawk; Tangyan; Mongyae; Kunhing; Mongton; Mongyawng; Mongyan; Mongpan; Maunkmai; Mongkai; Laikha
Tanintharyi	3: Yebyu; Kyunsu; Taninthayi
Yangon	16: Bahan; Pabedan; Latha; Kawhmu; Kungyangon; Dagon Myothi (North); Dawbon; Pazundaung; Hlaing; Shwepyitha; Htantabin; Hlegu; South Okkalapa; Kokoegyun; Kyimyindine; Insein
Total	100

=== Phase 3 ===
On 25 December, the 63 constituencies of phase 3, to be held on 25 January 2026, were announced.

States/Region	Townships
Ayeyarwady	9
Bago	8
Kachin	5: Bhamo; Mansi; Moemauk; Phakant; Shwegu
Kayin	2: Kawkareik; Kya-in-Seikky
Mandalay	8
Sagaing	2: Kani; Salingyi
Shan	9
Tanintharyi	3
Yangon	17
Total	63

== Political parties ==
The table below lists parties that managed to elect representatives to the Pyidaungsu Hluttaw in 2020 that have registered to contest the next election. Most parties in Myanmar represent one of the country's many ethnic minorities.

Name		Ideology	Leader	2020 result (of elected seats)	
Name		Ideology	Leader	Pyithu	Amyotha
USDP	Union Solidarity and Development Party ပြည်ထောင်စုကြံ့ခိုင်ရေးနှင့် ဖွံ့ဖြိုးရေးပါတီ	Pro-Tatmadaw; Burmese nationalism Social conservatism	Khin Yi	26 / 330	7 / 168
PNO	Pa-O National Organisation ပအိုဝ်း အမျိုးသား အဖွဲ့ချုပ်	Pa'O interests	Aung Kham Hti	3 / 330	1 / 168
MUP	Mon Unity Party မွန်ညီညွတ်ရေးပါတီ	Mon interests	Han Shwe	2 / 330	3 / 168
KSPP	Kachin State People's Party ကချင်ပြည်နယ်ပြည်သူ့ပါတီ	Kachin regionalism	n/a	1 / 330	0 / 168
AFP	Arakan Front Party ရခိုင့်ဦးဆောင်ပါတီ	Arakanese self-determination	Aye Maung	1 / 330	0 / 168
RNP	Rakhine Nationalities Party ရခိုင်တိုင်းရင်းသားများပါတီ	Arakanese self-determination	Ba Shein	1 / 330	0 / 168
WNP	Wa National Party ‘ဝ’အမျိုးသားပါတီ	Wa interests	Nyi Palot	1 / 330	0 / 168
ZCD	Zomi Congress for Democracy ဇိုမီး ဒီမိုကရေစီအဖွဲ့ချုပ်	Zomi interests Liberal democracy	Chin Sian Thang	1 / 330	0 / 168
NDP	New Democracy Party ဒီမိုကရေစီပါတီသစ်	Liberal democracy Kachin regionalism	San Khaung	0 / 330	1 / 168
2020 total results				39 / 330 (11.9% of seats)	16 / 168 (9.5% of seats)

The table below lists political parties that were dissolved by the junta, including the NLD and SNLD, that won 88% of the national parliamentary seats in the 2020 election.

Name		Ideology	Leader	2020 result (of elected seats)	
Name		Ideology	Leader	Pyithu	Amyotha
NLD	National League for Democracy အမျိုးသား ဒီမိုကရေစီ အဖွဲ့ချုပ်	Liberalism	Aung San Suu Kyi	258 / 330	138 / 168
SNLD	Shan Nationalities League for Democracy ရှမ်းတိုင်းရင်းသားများ ဒီမိုကရေစီ အဖွဲ့ချုပ်	Shan interests	Hkun Htun Oo	13 / 330	2 / 168
ANP	Arakan National Party ရခိုင်အမျိုးသားပါတီ	Rakhine nationalism	Thar Tun Hla	4 / 330	4 / 168
TNP	Ta'ang National Party တအာင်းအမျိုးသားပါတီ	Ta'ang interests	Aik Mone	3 / 330	2 / 168
KySDP	Kayah State Democratic Party ကယားပြည်နယ်ဒီမိုကရေစီပါတီ	Karenni interests	Po Re	2 / 330	3 / 168
2020 total results				276 / 330 (83.6% of seats)	145 / 168 (86.3% of seats)

Fifty-seven parties registered for participation in the election. Eight of those parties will compete nationally while the rest will compete regionally. Nationally competing parties include the People's Pioneer Party, the National Unity Party, the Myanmar Farmers Development Party, the People's Party, the Shan and Ethnic Democratic Party, the Women’s Party (Mon), and the Democratic Party of National Politics.

== Results ==
=== Amyotha Hluttaw ===
Party	List			Constituency			Total seats
Party	Votes	%	Seats	Votes	%	Seats	Total seats
Union Solidarity and Development Party	5,701,772	45.08	45	5,804,025	44.29	63	108
National Unity Party	2,081,571	16.46	16	2,114,237	16.13	0	16
People's Party	1,096,822	8.67	5	1,100,531	8.40	0	5
People's Pioneer Party	1,050,448	8.30	1	1,050,448	8.02	0	1
Shan Nationalities Democratic Party	867,536	6.86	1	867,536	6.62	0	1
Myanmar Farmers Development Party	684,521	5.41	0	684,521	5.22	0	0
Pa-O National Organisation	189,043	1.49	1	362,237	2.76	1	2
Mon Unity Party	153,344	1.21	2	153,344	1.17	3	5
Federal Democratic Party	117,514	0.93	0	117,514	0.90	0	0
Peace Party	93,279	0.74	0	93,279	0.71	0	0
Danu National Democracy Party	57,984	0.46	0	133,491	1.02	1	1
Labour Party	56,716	0.45	0	56,716	0.43	0	0
Karen National Democratic Party	52,167	0.41	2	52,167	0.40	1	3
United Nationalities Democracy Party	45,221	0.36	0	45,221	0.35	0	0
Unity and Development Party	44,110	0.35	0	44,110	0.34	0	0
National Interest and Development Party	40,440	0.32	1	40,440	0.31	0	1
Phalon-Sawaw Democratic Party	40,109	0.32	1	40,109	0.31	0	1
Peace and Development Party	35,824	0.28	0	35,824	0.27	0	0
Union Peace and Unity Party	35,314	0.28	0	35,314	0.27	0	0
Socio-Economic Promotion Party	31,310	0.25	0	31,310	0.24	0	0
Tai-Leng Nationalities Development Party	29,691	0.23	1	29,691	0.23	0	1
Shan-ni Solidarity Party	28,932	0.23	0	28,932	0.22	0	0
Arakan Front Party	24,457	0.19	2	24,457	0.19	1	3
Kachin State People's Party	19,751	0.16	1	19,751	0.15	0	1
Rakhine Nationalities Party	17,589	0.14	1	17,589	0.13	0	1
Pa-O National Unity Party	13,071	0.10	1	13,071	0.10	0	1
Pa-O National Development and Progress Party	11,199	0.09	0	11,199	0.09	0	0
Lisu National Development Party	9,336	0.07	0	9,336	0.07	0	0
New Democratic Party (Kachin)	8,421	0.07	0	8,421	0.06	0	0
Kayin State People's Party	8,076	0.06	1	8,076	0.06	0	1
Zomi National Party	1,990	0.02	2	1,990	0.02	1	3
Mro National Development Party	999	0.01	0	999	0.01	0	0
New Chin State Congress Party	422	0.00	0	0	0.00	0	0
Naga National Party				26,717	0.20	1	1
Independent				40,827	0.31	0	0
Wa National Party (Note: Elected unopposed.)						1	1
Cancelled						11	11
Military appointees							56
Total	12,648,979	100.00	84	13,103,430	100.00	84	224
Source: Union Election Commission

==== By State and Region (proportional seats) ====
Amyotha Hluttaw results by State and Region (proportional seats)
State/Region	Date	Constituency	Seats	USDP		NUP		PP		PPP		SNDP		MFDP	Pa-O NO		Mon UP		FDP	Peace	Danu NDP	Labour	Karen NDP		UNDP	UDP	NIDP		Phalon-Sawaw		P&Dev P	UP&UP	S-EPP	Tai-Leng NDP		Shan-Ni SP	Arakan FP		Kachin SPP		Rakhine NP		Pa-O NUP		Pa-O NDPP	Lisu NDP	NDP(K)	Kayin SPP		Zomi NP		Mro NDP	New Chin SCP	Total
State/Region	Date	Constituency	Seats	Votes	Seats	Votes	Seats	Votes	Seats	Votes	Seats	Votes	Seats	Votes	Votes	Seats	Votes	Seats	Votes	Votes	Votes	Votes	Votes	Seats	Votes	Votes	Votes	Seats	Votes	Seats	Votes	Votes	Votes	Votes	Seats	Votes	Votes	Seats	Votes	Seats	Votes	Seats	Votes	Seats	Votes	Votes	Votes	Votes	Seats	Votes	Seats	Votes	Votes	Total
Kachin State	11 January 2026	Nº 1	2	29,978	1	16,722	1			3,115				583																									1,714							9,336	8,421							69,869
Kachin State	25 January 2026	Nº 2	4	67,731	2	15,886				12,247				5,514																				29,691	1				18,037	1														149,106
Kayah State	11 January 2026	Nº 1	6	18,463	3	4,954	1			5,399	1																																					8,076	1					36,892
Karen State	25 January 2026	Nº 1	6	72,846	2					9,121		857											52,167	2					40,109	1													13,071	1										188,171
Chin State	28 December 2025	Nº 1	6	4,484	4					432																																								1,990	2		422	7,328
Sagaing Region	25 January 2026	Nº 1	2	62,913	1	28,539	1			7,599																										22,470																		121,521
Sagaing Region	11 January 2026	Nº 2	4	104,827	2	30,483	1	25,105	1	24,320		15,830																								6,462																		207,027
Tanintharyi Region	25 January 2026	Nº 1	6	132,228	3	89,888	2	44,053	1	26,132																																												292,301
Bago Region	25 January 2026	Nº 1	3	331,199	2	126,462	1	57,808		78,254		30,088		12,203					69,596													35,314																						740,924
Bago Region	25 January 2026	Nº 2	3	376,833	2	132,797	1	89,542		36,971		68,921		76,619					47,918																																			829,601
Magway Region	11 January 2026	Nº 1	3	118,733	2	65,949	1			21,395		25,198		7,239																																								238,514
Magway Region	11 January 2026	Nº 2	3	247,536	2	180,742	1	51,934		55,791				27,039																																								563,042
Mandalay Region	25 January 2026	Nº 1	2	267,292	1	123,050	1	44,665		75,099		30,439		28,234																																								568,779
Mandalay Region	25 January 2026	Nº 2	2	314,767	1	139,609	1	95,600		79,197		70,395		65,297																																								764,865
Mandalay Region	25 January 2026	Nº 3	2	598,488	1	181,196	1	112,143		93,527		72,433		94,532																			31,310																					1,183,629
Mon State	11 January 2026	Nº 1	6	148,211	2	50,539	1	25,507		23,641		10,784					153,344	2									40,440	1																	11,199									463,665
Rakhine State	28 December 2025	Nº 1	3	23,846	2					1,690																											8,346	1			4,972											999		39,853
Rakhine State	28 December 2025	Nº 2	3	15,416	1					1,642																											16,111	1			12,617	1												45,786
Yangon Region	25 January 2026	Nº 1	2	398,181	1	53,301		113,058	1	78,841		56,675		28,593						25,652					16,762	44,110					23,026																							838,199
Yangon Region	25 January 2026	Nº 2	2	395,322	1	115,439		120,673	1	86,971		68,638		66,028						46,071		44,225																																943,367
Yangon Region	25 January 2026	Nº 3	2	223,877	1	76,193		102,471	1	36,507		43,934		18,346						21,556		12,491			28,459						12,798																							576,632
Shan State	25 January 2026	Nº 1	2	253,115	1	39,527		36,467		21,789		106,753			174,659	1					57,984																																	690,294
Shan State	25 January 2026	Nº 2	2	106,399	1			5,641		4,150		44,856	1		6,443																																							167,489
Shan State	25 January 2026	Nº 3	2	176,693	2					5,221		40,619			7,941																																							230,474
Ayeyarwady Region	25 January 2026	Nº 1	3	584,523	2	322,069	1	49,932		125,713		117,433		102,132																																								1,301,802
Ayeyarwady Region	25 January 2026	Nº 2	3	627,871	2	288,226	1	122,223		135,684		63,683		152,162																																								1,389,849
Total				5,701,772	45	2,081,571	16	1,096,822	5	1,050,448	1	867,536	1	684,521	189,043	1	153,344	2	117,514	93,279	57,984	56,716	52,167	2	45,221	44,110	40,440	1	40,109	1	35,824	35,314	31,310	29,691	1	28,932	24,457	2	19,751	1	17,589	1	13,071	1	11,199	9,336	8,421	8,076	1	1,990	2	999	422	12,648,979

==== By constituencies ====
Amyotha Hluttaw results by constituency
State/Region	Date	Constituency	USDP	NUP	PP	PPP	S&NDP	MFDP	Pa-O NO	Mon UP	Danu NDP	FDP	Peace	Labour	Karen NDP	UNDP	UDP	NIDP	Phalon-Sawaw	Peace&DevP	UP&UP	S-EPP	Tai-Leng NDP	Shan-ni NDP	Naga NP	Arakan FP	Kachin SPP	Rakhine NP	Pa-O NUP	Pa-O NDPP	Lisu NDP	NDP(K)	Kayin SPP	Zomi NP	Mro NDP	New Chin SCP	Ind	Wa NP	Total
Kachin State	11 January 2026	Nº 1	14,767	11,883		1,634																									3,703	1,542							33,529
Kachin State	25 January 2026	Nº 2	8,376	797		209																	412				351												10,145
Kachin State	25 January 2026	Nº 3	34,081	7,156		5,774		5,514															22,692				8,824												84,041
Kachin State	28 December 2025	Nº 4	7,645	2,104		498																									2,472	2,352							15,071
Kachin State	11 January 2026	Nº 5	7,566	2,735		983		583																			1,714				3,161	4,527							21,269
Kachin State	28 December 2025	Nº 6	25,274	7,933		6,264																	6,587				8,862												54,920
Kayah State	28 December 2025	Nº 1	14,524	4,725		5,122																											7,686						32,057
Kayah State	28 December 2025	Nº 2	1,575	67		34																											74						1,750
Kayah State	11 January 2026	Nº 3	1,388	162		209																											278						2,037
Kayah State	11 January 2026	Nº 4	976			34																											38						1,048
Kayah State	—	Nº 5	Election not held																																				
Kayah State	—	Nº 6	Election not held																																				
Karen State	25 January 2026	Nº 1	6,963			393									1,722				873										1,037										10,988
Karen State	25 January 2026	Nº 2	3,296			495	404												1,073										268										5,536
Karen State	11 January 2026	Nº 3	12,657			2,159									22,094				9,604																				46,514
Karen State	28 December 2025	Nº 4	36,853			4,791									24,447				23,117										9,681										98,889
Karen State	28 December 2025	Nº 5	6,631			1,283									3,239				4,352										1,868										17,373
Karen State	11 January 2026	Nº 6	6,446				453								665				1,090										217										8,871
Chin State	28 December 2025	Nº 1	1,950			41																												1,990		422			4,403
Chin State	—	Nº 2	Election not held																																				
Chin State	—	Nº 3	Election not held																																				
Chin State	—	Nº 4	Election not held																																				
Chin State	—	Nº 5	Election not held																																				
Chin State	28 December 2025	Nº 6	2,534			391																																	2,925
Sagaing Region	28 December 2025	Nº 1	20,617																						26,717														47,334
Sagaing Region	11 January 2026	Nº 2	35,686	15,175		4,690																		22,470															78,021
Sagaing Region	25 January 2026	Nº 3	27,227	13,364		2,909																																	43,500
Sagaing Region	11 January 2026	Nº 4	58,304	30,483	13,437	17,241	15,830																																135,295
Sagaing Region	11 January 2026	Nº 5	8,053		3,513	3,826																																	15,392
Sagaing Region	11 January 2026	Nº 6	38,470		8,155	3,253																		6,462															56,340
Tanintharyi Region	28 December 2025	Nº 1	19,972	19,809																																			39,781
Tanintharyi Region	25 January 2026	Nº 2	20,109	13,228		8,497																															5,676		47,510
Tanintharyi Region	25 January 2026	Nº 3	10,340	5,836		3,178																																	19,354
Tanintharyi Region	28 December 2025	Nº 4	11,225	8,719																																			19,944
Tanintharyi Region	25 January 2026	Nº 5	39,296	33,277	28,706	11,938																																	113,217
Tanintharyi Region	11 January 2026	Nº 6	31,286	9,019	15,347	2,519																																	58,171
Bago Region	25 January 2026	Nº 1	90,709	50,037	27,500		18,412	21,629				17,345																											225,632
Bago Region	25 January 2026	Nº 2	103,414	29,096	25,841	15,221	21,445	19,627				12,626																											227,270
Bago Region	25 January 2026	Nº 3	80,913	21,762		14,837	11,302	12,203				21,632									14,553																		177,202
Bago Region	25 January 2026	Nº 4	182,710	53,664	36,201	21,750	29,064	35,363				17,947																											376,699
Bago Region	11 January 2026	Nº 5	119,019	37,557	17,234	27,915	18,786					15,820									20,761																		257,092
Bago Region	25 January 2026	Nº 6	131,267	67,143	40,574	35,502						32,144																											306,630
Magway Region	28 December 2025	Nº 1	23,732	11,894	7,787	8,471																																	51,884
Magway Region	11 January 2026	Nº 2	93,260	55,601	44,147	26,789																																	219,797
Magway Region	11 January 2026	Nº 3	79,768	67,963		20,531		27,039																															195,301
Magway Region	11 January 2026	Nº 4	81,199	47,764		12,808	15,954																														17,372		175,097
Magway Region	11 January 2026	Nº 5	37,534	18,185		8,587	9,244	7,239																															80,789
Magway Region	11 January 2026	Nº 6	50,776	45,284																																			96,060
Mandalay Region	25 January 2026	Nº 1	171,357	56,983	44,665	34,209	30,439	28,234																															365,887
Mandalay Region	25 January 2026	Nº 2	95,935	66,067		40,890																																	202,892
Mandalay Region	25 January 2026	Nº 3	157,295	65,841	36,832	32,417	35,610	27,131																															355,126
Mandalay Region	25 January 2026	Nº 4	157,472	73,768	58,768	46,780	34,785	38,166																															409,739
Mandalay Region	25 January 2026	Nº 5	294,479	102,482	61,642	50,790	41,987	51,864																															603,244
Mandalay Region	28 December 2025	Nº 6	304,009	78,714	50,501	42,737	30,446	42,668														31,310																	580,385
Mon State	11 January 2026	Nº 1	22,923	10,688	5,280	6,402	1,662			3,745								7,989												2,631									61,320
Mon State	28 December 2025	Nº 2	43,534	9,160	9,652	6,112	4,489			30,044								8,927																					111,918
Mon State	11 January 2026	Nº 3	24,689	5,809	4,026	2,315				57,884								5,806																					100,529
Mon State	28 December 2025	Nº 4	19,269	3,955		1,980	2,098			20,605								3,721																					51,628
Mon State	11 January 2026	Nº 5	6,297	1,228						10,893								2,252																					20,670
Mon State	11 January 2026	Nº 6	31,499	19,699	6,549	6,832	2,535			30,173								11,745												8,568									117,600
Rakhine State	28 December 2025	Nº 1	9,162			1,642																				11,986		9,967											32,757
Rakhine State	28 December 2025	Nº 2	6,254																							4,125		2,650											13,029
Rakhine State	28 December 2025	Nº 3	23,846			1,690																				8,346		4,972							999				39,853
Rakhine State	—	Nº 4	Election not held																																				
Rakhine State	—	Nº 5	Election not held																																				
Rakhine State	—	Nº 6	Election not held																																				
Yangon Region	25 January 2026	Nº 1	131,110	40,102	47,540	36,507	24,257	18,346								16,210				12,798																			326,870
Yangon Region	25 January 2026	Nº 2	92,767	36,091	54,931		19,677						21,556	12,491		12,249																							249,762
Yangon Region	11 January 2026	Nº 3	231,629	53,301	57,966	35,244	31,944	28,593									23,771																						462,448
Yangon Region	25 January 2026	Nº 4	166,552		55,092	43,597	24,731						25,652			16,762	20,339			23,026																			375,751
Yangon Region	25 January 2026	Nº 5	306,472	83,823	86,004	60,966	68,638	44,749					28,165	29,943																									708,760
Yangon Region	25 January 2026	Nº 6	88,850	31,616	34,669	26,005		21,279					17,906	14,282																									234,607
Shan State	—	Nº 1																																				Unopposed	—
Shan State	11 January 2026	Nº 2	39,756								57,618																												97,374
Shan State	25 January 2026	Nº 3	41,880						173,194																														215,074
Shan State	—	Nº 4	Election not held																																				
Shan State	—	Nº 5	Election not held																																				
Shan State	25 January 2026	Nº 6	536,207	72,193	45,817	31,160	192,228		189,043		75,873																										17,779		1,160,300
Ayeyarwady Region	25 January 2026	Nº 1	138,890	66,409		23,833	20,149	33,420																															282,701
Ayeyarwady Region	25 January 2026	Nº 2	192,026	86,690	49,932	43,527	42,572																																414,747
Ayeyarwady Region	25 January 2026	Nº 3	218,874	81,053	45,500	41,011		42,120																															428,558
Ayeyarwady Region	25 January 2026	Nº 4	190,223	86,037	76,723	31,004	27,486	51,386																															462,859
Ayeyarwady Region	25 January 2026	Nº 5	253,607	168,970		58,353	54,712	68,712																															604,354
Ayeyarwady Region	25 January 2026	Nº 6	218,774	121,136		63,669	36,197	58,656																															498,432
Total			5,804,025	2,114,237	1,100,531	1,050,448	867,536	684,521	362,237	153,344	133,491	117,514	93,279	56,716	52,167	45,221	44,110	40,440	40,109	35,824	35,314	31,310	29,691	28,932	26,717	24,457	19,751	17,589	13,071	11,199	9,336	8,421	8,076	1,990	999	422	40,827	—	13,103,852

=== Pyithu Hluttaw ===
Pyithu Hluttaw results for the first phase were released in portions from January 2 to January 4, 2026. Agence-France Presse called the first phase for the USDP, with 89 out of 102 (87%) of the first-phase seats won. Results for 14 additional constituencies were also announced in the first set of results, for a total of 116 constituencies declared, of which the USDP won 102. Many USDP candidates, especially in Naypyidaw Union Territory, were powerful retired military officers, including Tin Aung San, Khin Maung Myint, USDP deputy leader Myat Hein, Maung Maung Ohn, USDP leader Khin Yi, and Hla Swe, as well as Mya Tun Oo in Mandalay Region.

Party	Votes	%	Seats
Union Solidarity and Development Party	5,753,096	44.20	231
National Unity Party	1,744,943	13.41	4
People's Party	1,149,720	8.83	0
People's Pioneer Party	1,000,815	7.69	0
Shan Nationalities Democratic Party	802,414	6.16	7
Myanmar Farmers Development Party	691,628	5.31	0
Pa-O National Organisation	331,331	2.55	5
Mon Unity Party	145,786	1.12	5
Kayin People's Party	124,805	0.96	0
88 Generation Student Youths (Union of Myanmar) Party	100,883	0.78	0
Danu National Democracy Party	81,465	0.63	1
Federal Democratic Party	74,142	0.57	0
National Interest and Development Party	48,926	0.38	0
Karen National Democratic Party	48,702	0.37	1
Inn National League Party	44,037	0.34	1
Phalon-Sawaw Democratic Party	33,772	0.26	0
Naga National Party	32,386	0.25	4
Tai-Leng Nationalities Development Party	29,375	0.23	0
Modern People Party	26,121	0.20	0
Peace and Development Party	25,457	0.20	0
United Nationalities Democracy Party	25,249	0.19	0
Union Peace and Unity Party	25,098	0.19	0
Democratic Party	25,002	0.19	0
Socio-Economic Promotion Party	23,114	0.18	0
Arakan Front Party	22,567	0.17	0
Kachin State People's Party	21,765	0.17	1
Democratic Forces Labour Party	20,429	0.16	0
New Generation Wunthanu Party	19,955	0.15	0
People's Party of Myanmar Farmers and Workers	19,818	0.15	0
Shan-ni Solidarity Party	19,564	0.15	1
Rakhine Nationalities Party	18,901	0.15	1
National Political Alliance League Party	17,368	0.13	0
Peace and Diversity Party	16,767	0.13	0
Unity and Development Party	14,173	0.11	0
New National Democracy Party	12,725	0.10	0
Public of Labour Party	11,988	0.09	0
Pa-O National Unity Party	10,960	0.08	0
New Democratic Party (Kachin)	10,613	0.08	0
Mon Progressive Party	9,225	0.07	0
Kayin State People's Party	9,211	0.07	0
Union of Myanmar Federation of National Politics	9,087	0.07	0
Party for the People	7,278	0.06	0
Lisu National Development Party	6,786	0.05	0
Kokang Democracy and Unity Party	6,362	0.05	0
Wa National Party	6,303	0.05	0
Pa-O National Development and Progress Party	6,210	0.05	0
Bamar People's Party	6,097	0.05	0
Myanmar People's Democratic Party	5,696	0.04	0
Peace Party	5,427	0.04	0
National Political New Energy Party	3,186	0.02	0
Kha Mee National Development Party	2,289	0.02	0
Zomi National Party	1,633	0.01	0
Rakhine State National United Party	1,268	0.01	0
New Chinland Congress Party	1,206	0.01	0
Mro National Development Party	555	0.00	0
Khumi (Khami) National Party	231	0.00	0
Independent	303,085	2.33	1
Cancelled			67
Military appointees			110
Total	13,016,995	100.00	440
Source: Union Election Commission

==== By constituencies ====
Pyithu Hluttaw results by constituency
State/Region	Date	Constituency	USDP	NUP	PP	PPP	S&NDP	MFDP	Pa-O NO	Mon UP	Kayin PP	88G	Danu NDP	FDP	NIDP	Karen NDP	Inn NLP	Phalon-Sawaw	Naga NP	Tai-Leng NDP	MPP	P Devel P	UNDP	UPUP	DP	S-EPP	Arakan FP	Kachin SPP	DFLP	NGWP	PPMFW	Shan-ni SP	Rakhine NP	NPALP	P Diversity P	UDP	NNDP	Public of LP	Pa-O NUP	NDP(K)	Mon PP	Kayin SPP	UMFNP	P for the P	Lisu NDP	Kokang DUP	Wa NP	Pa-O NDPP	Bamar PP	MPDP	Peace	NPNEP	Kha Mee NDP	Zomi NP	Rakhine SNUP	New Chinland	Mro NDP	Khumi (Khami)	Ind	Total
Kachin State	28 December 2025	Tanai	7,617	1,823		372		491																																2,198					2,572															15,073
Kachin State	28 December 2025	Kawnglanghpu	2,502	1,429		96																																							642															4,669
Kachin State	28 December 2025	Putao	11,242	3,475		986	1,433	887																				3,236												885																				22,144
Kachin State	28 December 2025	Mohnyin	13,655	4,329		1,961		4,953												11,739																																								36,637
Kachin State	28 December 2025	Myitkyina	24,605	5,102	1,925	5,698	1,598	2,507												3,959								6,311												3,325																				55,030
Kachin State	11 January 2026	Machanbaw	1,452			775																						1,665																																3,892
Kachin State	11 January 2026	Mogaung	19,989			4,053														11,219								8,515																																43,776
Kachin State	11 January 2026	Waingmaw	6,045	1,509		753	1,152	370												1,808								1,846												4,205					3,572															21,260
Kachin State	25 January 2026	Bhamo	4,964			96	65													86								192																																5,403
Kachin State	25 January 2026	Hpakant	1,677			1,397														564																																								3,638
Kachin State	—	Nogmung	Unopposed																																																									—
Kachin State	—	Shwegu	Unopposed																																																									—
Kachin State	—	Mansi	Election not held																																																									
Kachin State	—	Momauk	Election not held																																																									
Kachin State	—	Sumprabum	Election not held																																																									
Kachin State	—	Chipwi	Election not held																																																									
Kachin State	—	Hsawlaw	Election not held																																																									
Kachin State	—	Injangyang	Election not held																																																									
Kayah State	28 December 2025	Bawlakhe	1,569	56		38																																				88																		1,751
Kayah State	28 December 2025	Loikaw	14,493	4,746		4,099																																				8,703																		32,041
Kayah State	11 January 2026	Demoso	1,423			256																																				355																		2,034
Kayah State	11 January 2026	Hpruso	971			15																																				65																		1,051
Kayah State	—	Hpasawng	Election not held																																																									
Kayah State	—	Mese	Election not held																																																									
Kayah State	—	Shadaw	Election not held																																																									
Karen State	28 December 2025	Hpa-an	34,104			3,871										29,196		14,916																					8,407		8,539																			99,033
Karen State	28 December 2025	Myawaddy	7,929			1,823												6,018																					1,591																					17,361
Karen State	28 December 2025	Thandaunggyi	2,001			22												489																																										2,512
Karen State	11 January 2026	Hpapun	4,796			284	442											839																																										6,361
Karen State	11 January 2026	Hlaingbwe	13,937			2,135	2,462									19,506		8,499																																										46,539
Karen State	25 January 2026	Kawkareik	7,332			371												1,637																					962		686																			10,988
Karen State	25 January 2026	Kyain Seikgyi	3,458			325	384											1,374																																										5,541
Chin State	28 December 2025	Tedim	1,992																																																			1,633		610				4,235
Chin State	28 December 2025	Hakha	2,007																																																					596		231		2,834
Chin State	—	Thantlang	Election not held																																																									
Chin State	—	Tonzang	Election not held																																																									
Chin State	—	Falam	Election not held																																																									
Chin State	—	Kanpetlet	Election not held																																																									
Chin State	—	Mindat	Election not held																																																									
Chin State	—	Paletwa	Election not held																																																									
Chin State	—	Matupi	Election not held																																																									
Sagaing Region	28 December 2025	Leshi	3,663																4,769																																									8,432
Sagaing Region	28 December 2025	Lahe	7,334																11,599																																									18,933
Sagaing Region	28 December 2025	Nanyun	9,875																10,107																																									19,982
Sagaing Region	28 December 2025	Kale	19,037	11,135																																																								30,172
Sagaing Region	28 December 2025	Katha	5,852	4,054																																																								9,906
Sagaing Region	28 December 2025	Kanbalu	18,470	4,447	4,579																																																							27,496
Sagaing Region	28 December 2025	Hkamti	3,850	1,087															5,911													2,229																												13,077
Sagaing Region	28 December 2025	Sagaing	23,874	5,966	3,559	3,964	4,949	4,253																																																				46,565
Sagaing Region	28 December 2025	Tamu	10,157	6,297																																																								16,454
Sagaing Region	28 December 2025	Monywa	26,026	14,329		9,432	7,563	11,742																																																				69,092
Sagaing Region	28 December 2025	Shwebo	4,299		2,057																																																							6,356
Sagaing Region	28 December 2025	Homalin	11,779			3,897																										16,522																												32,198
Sagaing Region	11 January 2026	Kalewa	2,784	1,651																																																								4,435
Sagaing Region	11 January 2026	Kyunhla	9,551	2,431	1,962																																																							13,944
Sagaing Region	11 January 2026	Myinmu	3,432		892	791	815	764																																																				6,694
Sagaing Region	11 January 2026	Chaung-U	2,981			1,087		1,316																																																			1,694	7,078
Sagaing Region	11 January 2026	Budalin	1,406			318																																																						1,724
Sagaing Region	11 January 2026	Ayadaw	2,146			712	642	676																																																				4,176
Sagaing Region	11 January 2026	Paungbyin	8,122	2,314																												813																												11,249
Sagaing Region	—	Mingin	Unopposed																																																									—
Sagaing Region	—	Wuntho	Unopposed																																																									—
Sagaing Region	—	Mawlaik	Unopposed																																																									—
Sagaing Region	—	Ye-U	Unopposed																																																									—
Sagaing Region	—	Kani	Unopposed																																																									—
Sagaing Region	—	Salingyi	Unopposed																																																									—
Sagaing Region	—	Htigyaing	Election not held																																																									
Sagaing Region	—	Banmauk	Election not held																																																									
Sagaing Region	—	Indaw	Election not held																																																									
Sagaing Region	—	Kawlin	Election not held																																																									
Sagaing Region	—	Pinlebu	Election not held																																																									
Sagaing Region	—	Myaung	Election not held																																																									
Sagaing Region	—	Pale	Election not held																																																									
Sagaing Region	—	Yinmabin	Election not held																																																									
Sagaing Region	—	Khin-U	Election not held																																																									
Sagaing Region	—	Tabayin	Election not held																																																									
Sagaing Region	—	Wetlet	Election not held																																																									
Sagaing Region	—	Taze	Election not held																																																									
Tanintharyi Region	28 December 2025	Kawthaung	18,234	6,676		3,310		5,486																																									6,097											39,803
Tanintharyi Region	28 December 2025	Dawei	21,457	5,742	5,351	3,390		4,110																																																				40,050
Tanintharyi Region	28 December 2025	Bokepyin	9,735	4,421	4,071			1,713																																																				19,940
Tanintharyi Region	28 December 2025	Myeik	29,893	20,286	27,011	8,513		10,719																																																				96,422
Tanintharyi Region	11 January 2026	Kyunsu	26,108	10,716	11,729			4,326																																																				52,879
Tanintharyi Region	11 January 2026	Tanintharyi	2,539	1,191	1,321			287																																																				5,338
Tanintharyi Region	25 January 2026	Thayetchaung	3,926			3,604																																																						7,530
Tanintharyi Region	25 January 2026	Palaw	7,686	4,691	3,278	1,139																																																						16,794
Tanintharyi Region	—	Yebyu	Unopposed																																																									—
Tanintharyi Region	—	Launglon	Unopposed																																																									—
Bago Region	28 December 2025	Nyaunglebin	23,021	10,370	11,428	5,775	4,490																																																					55,084
Bago Region	28 December 2025	Taungoo	37,471	9,475	7,283	5,253	4,590	10,624						4,765										3,623																																				83,084
Bago Region	28 December 2025	Nattalin	24,640	6,919		4,047	3,356							5,669																													9,087																	53,718
Bago Region	28 December 2025	Bago	80,137	25,230	18,504	11,671	9,878	11,254																																																			7,232	163,906
Bago Region	28 December 2025	Pyay	37,075	12,742	9,764	5,340	5,746	4,786						4,236										5,219																																			5,263	90,171
Bago Region	28 December 2025	Shwedaung	21,680	8,402	5,802	15,884	5,754	3,777						3,734																																														65,033
Bago Region	28 December 2025	Letpadan	20,919	11,282	5,948	6,259	5,540	6,038						5,004																																														60,990
Bago Region	28 December 2025	Tharrawaddy	29,443	10,218	4,167	10,197	3,723	3,500						5,164										3,157																																				69,569
Bago Region	11 January 2026	Daik-U	22,802	10,773	6,259	6,860		5,500						4,207																																													7,564	63,965
Bago Region	11 January 2026	Shwegyin	10,262	5,782	3,404		1,323																																																					20,771
Bago Region	11 January 2026	Htantabin	5,647	1,699	1,530	663																																																						9,539
Bago Region	11 January 2026	Yedashe	24,417	8,023	4,931		6,970	3,743																6,226																																				54,310
Bago Region	11 January 2026	Zigon	21,787	2,843	2,355	2,122	1,763	1,528						2,118																																														34,516
Bago Region	11 January 2026	Paungde	19,817	5,307		3,054	4,481	3,169						2,983																																														38,811
Bago Region	11 January 2026	Kawa	42,180	12,829	7,958	5,087	5,692	5,891						7,886																																														87,523
Bago Region	11 January 2026	Thanatpin	29,412	8,201	4,951	3,206	6,023	3,345																																																				55,138
Bago Region	11 January 2026	Paukkaung	22,570	2,027	788	695	594	738						727																																														28,139
Bago Region	11 January 2026	Pandaung	41,022	10,880	5,118	5,631	2,897	3,745						4,713																																														74,006
Bago Region	11 January 2026	Monyo	30,064	16,323		4,040	4,951	2,911						3,415																																													3,496	65,200
Bago Region	11 January 2026	Minhla	18,271	7,027		7,339	2,906	5,979						3,517																																														45,039
Bago Region	25 January 2026	Kyaukkyi	5,101	1,270				738																																																				7,109
Bago Region	25 January 2026	Kyauktaga	32,556	16,915	7,937	8,430	5,876																																																				7,391	79,105
Bago Region	25 January 2026	Pyu	18,102	5,094	3,993	4,352		2,464																																																				34,005
Bago Region	25 January 2026	Oktwin	20,593	6,351	7,654	3,000	2,259	3,619																																																			2,863	46,339
Bago Region	25 January 2026	Thegon	19,698	5,372	3,844	6,374	2,743	2,412						2,912										6,873																																				50,228
Bago Region	25 January 2026	Waw	38,895	12,459		4,400	8,036	6,019																																																				69,809
Bago Region	25 January 2026	Gyobingauk	15,773		3,456	2,701	2,914	2,299						9,137																																														36,280
Bago Region	25 January 2026	Okpho	14,736			3,200	4,562	3,376						3,955																																														29,829
Magway Region	28 December 2025	Chauk	10,374	4,137	4,357	4,831	3,232																																																					26,931
Magway Region	28 December 2025	Yenangyaung	13,397	5,223		2,963	3,387																																																					24,970
Magway Region	28 December 2025	Pakokku	25,006	15,430			9,860																																																					50,296
Magway Region	28 December 2025	Taungdwingyi	36,090	40,590		8,681		12,797																																																				98,158
Magway Region	28 December 2025	Magway	63,726	25,193	25,451	12,896	10,720																																																					137,986
Magway Region	28 December 2025	Pwintbyu	25,974	15,036	14,647																																																							55,657
Magway Region	28 December 2025	Minbu	35,427	12,158	8,845	4,693	5,997	4,381																																																				71,501
Magway Region	28 December 2025	Thayet	10,821	5,874	5,684			3,182																																																				25,561
Magway Region	28 December 2025	Aunglan	34,108	13,623	12,681			8,277																																																				68,689
Magway Region	11 January 2026	Seikphyu	6,186	1,891																																																								8,077
Magway Region	11 January 2026	Natmauk	11,422	10,319		5,205																																																						26,946
Magway Region	11 January 2026	Myothit	17,031	20,149	9,891	3,904	3,977																																																					54,952
Magway Region	11 January 2026	Ngape	10,155	6,743	5,042																																																							21,940
Magway Region	11 January 2026	Salin	10,585	4,753	3,056			4,007																																																				22,401
Magway Region	11 January 2026	Sidoktaya	7,064	7,590				3,429																																																				18,083
Magway Region	11 January 2026	Kamma	11,712	7,164	7,066																																																							25,942
Magway Region	11 January 2026	Mindon	4,891	3,492																																																								8,383
Magway Region	11 January 2026	Minhla	19,741	16,484																																																								36,225
Magway Region	11 January 2026	Sinbaungwe	15,039	13,370																																																								28,409
Magway Region	—	Gangaw	Unopposed																																																									—
Magway Region	—	Saw	Election not held																																																									
Magway Region	—	Tilin	Election not held																																																									
Magway Region	—	Pauk	Election not held																																																									
Magway Region	—	Myaing	Election not held																																																									
Magway Region	—	Yesagyo	Election not held																																																									
Mandalay Region	28 December 2025	Kyaukse	66,179	20,724	14,788	11,795	12,059	10,136																																																				135,681
Mandalay Region	28 December 2025	Nyaung-U	18,471	12,058	11,332	7,623																				6,652																																		56,136
Mandalay Region	28 December 2025	Pyinoolwin	66,343	14,401	11,806	9,807	11,687	6,815																																																				120,859
Mandalay Region	28 December 2025	Chanayethazan	21,159	8,624	11,257	7,847	5,050	4,542																																																			7,256	65,735
Mandalay Region	28 December 2025	Meiktila	77,841	16,428	12,067	13,694	8,208	10,322																																																				138,560
Mandalay Region	28 December 2025	Pyawbwe	65,453	17,159	11,849	8,802	6,937	13,775																																																				123,975
Mandalay Region	28 December 2025	Yamethin	51,936	19,305	9,956	6,191	6,843	15,670																		4,610																																		114,511
Mandalay Region	28 December 2025	Aungmyethazan	33,491	14,375	8,648	9,878	7,202	6,737																					4,723																															85,054
Mandalay Region	11 January 2026	Sintgaing	36,461	12,230	8,759	6,478	4,561	9,108																						8,299																														85,896
Mandalay Region	11 January 2026	Kyaukpadaung	33,266	14,963	12,548	9,049	9,142																			7,255																																		86,223
Mandalay Region	11 January 2026	Tada-U	14,098	7,362	4,025	3,285	2,026																																																					30,796
Mandalay Region	11 January 2026	Pyigyidagun	24,561	7,771	8,583	8,050	4,424	7,240																																																				60,629
Mandalay Region	11 January 2026	Maha Aungmye	29,416	14,044	11,434	9,006	6,808	6,703																																																				77,411
Mandalay Region	11 January 2026	Wundwin	35,903	20,002	12,405	18,172	6,381																							9,834																														102,697
Mandalay Region	11 January 2026	Thazi	49,492	15,841	8,650	7,669	4,892	15,056																																																				101,600
Mandalay Region	11 January 2026	Amarapura	50,409	15,405	10,477	9,176	5,441	7,674																					9,746																														13,022	121,350
Mandalay Region	11 January 2026	Madaya	14,186	7,671	3,651	3,035	2,973																																																					31,516
Mandalay Region	25 January 2026	Myittha	59,166	15,279	10,955	10,202	6,433	6,786																																																				108,821
Mandalay Region	25 January 2026	Nganzun	2,788	1,840		341																																																						4,969
Mandalay Region	25 January 2026	Chanmyathazi	37,323	14,608	9,077	9,549	7,516	6,662																																																				84,735
Mandalay Region	25 January 2026	Mahlaing	9,877	3,368	2,687	1,735	2,536																							1,822																														22,025
Mandalay Region	25 January 2026	Taungtha	3,788	2,086		1,232																																																						7,106
Mandalay Region	25 January 2026	Myingyan	28,922	13,639		10,920																																																						53,481
Mandalay Region	25 January 2026	Thabeikkyin	3,826	933	167	552	70																																																					5,548
Mandalay Region	25 January 2026	Patheingyi	43,541	23,800	10,628	11,822	9,041	7,632																					5,960																															112,424
Mandalay Region	—	Singu	Election not held																																																									
Mandalay Region	—	Mogok	Election not held																																																									
Mandalay Region	—	Natogyi	Election not held																																																									
Naypyidaw	28 December 2025	Zeyathiri	49,006	4,887	3,823	3,298	2,782	4,885																																																				68,681
Naypyidaw	28 December 2025	Pobbathiri	44,746	6,916	7,931	5,634	4,345	3,653																																																			2,953	76,178
Naypyidaw	28 December 2025	Zabuthiri	28,867	3,248	2,685	3,373	1,536	1,771																																																			6,011; 2,290	49,781
Naypyidaw	28 December 2025	Pyinmana	37,671	9,246	8,858	8,523	5,040	5,883																		4,597																																		79,818
Naypyidaw	28 December 2025	Dekkhinathiri	12,821	1,887	1,513	1,393	1,142	1,242																																																			1,815	21,813
Naypyidaw	28 December 2025	Lewe	57,323	25,205	12,840	9,538	6,530	11,300																																																			10,855	133,591
Naypyidaw	28 December 2025	Tatkon	57,491	16,070	10,093	10,107	5,690	10,580																																																				110,031
Naypyidaw	28 December 2025	Ottarathiri	24,770	5,179	3,062	3,438	1,279	2,817																																																				40,545
Mon State	28 December 2025	Kyaikto	10,616	5,855		2,800									4,071																																													23,342
Mon State	28 December 2025	Kyaikmaraw	10,679		2,160	1,028		541		4,464					2,183																																													21,055
Mon State	28 December 2025	Chaungzon	20,679			2,500				23,630					4,806																																													51,615
Mon State	28 December 2025	Mawlamyine	30,896	6,207	6,193	5,477	2,621	2,882		25,312					11,327																																													90,915
Mon State	28 December 2025	Thaton	19,793	6,346	4,238	2,934									6,359																																	6,210												45,880
Mon State	11 January 2026	Bilin	14,688	7,720	4,652	6,648									4,202																																													37,910
Mon State	11 January 2026	Mudon	13,477	2,102	2,041	1,100		1,091		31,944					3,597																																													55,352
Mon State	11 January 2026	Thanbyuzayat	12,744	2,621	2,334	1,371				22,275					3,810																																													45,155
Mon State	11 January 2026	Ye	6,524							11,729					2,430																																													20,683
Mon State	11 January 2026	Paung	23,231	6,431	4,961	4,551				26,432					6,141																																													71,747
Rakhine State	28 December 2025	Kyaukpyu	6,355																								4,364						2,306																											13,025
Rakhine State	28 December 2025	Sittwe	24,140																								7,118						4,514																				2,289		1,268		555			39,884
Rakhine State	28 December 2025	Manaung	9,589																								11,085						12,081																											32,755
Rakhine State	—	Ramree	Election not held																																																									
Rakhine State	—	Ann	Election not held																																																									
Rakhine State	—	Pauktaw	Election not held																																																									
Rakhine State	—	Ponnagyun	Election not held																																																									
Rakhine State	—	Rathedaung	Election not held																																																									
Rakhine State	—	Buthidaung	Election not held																																																									
Rakhine State	—	Maungdaw	Election not held																																																									
Rakhine State	—	Kyauktaw	Election not held																																																									
Rakhine State	—	Minbya	Election not held																																																									
Rakhine State	—	Myebon	Election not held																																																									
Rakhine State	—	Mrauk-U	Election not held																																																									
Rakhine State	—	Gwa	Election not held																																																									
Rakhine State	—	Taungup	Election not held																																																									
Rakhine State	—	Thandwe	Election not held																																																									
Yangon Region	28 December 2025	Kamayut	5,551	2,029	1,807	1,785	997	1,587																																																				13,756
Yangon Region	28 December 2025	Kyauktada	3,523		821	681	551	485																																																			715; 364	7,140
Yangon Region	28 December 2025	Taikkyi	49,190	16,274	11,543	6,357	8,403	6,047															5,629		5,370									9,735	7,377	7,197																								133,122
Yangon Region	28 December 2025	Twante	45,438		6,657	8,249	5,244	6,486				28,733											5,209																																				8,653	114,669
Yangon Region	28 December 2025	South Dagon	29,502	6,711	9,696	11,543	3,896	3,985														3,758	4,052		5,247																																		5,108	83,498
Yangon Region	28 December 2025	Botataung	8,675		2,475	1,992	1,923																																																					15,065
Yangon Region	28 December 2025	Mayangon	19,387	3,236	3,796	4,292	2,308																1,909																												1,699								6,347	42,974
Yangon Region	28 December 2025	Mingaladon	54,346	7,801	11,215	10,260	3,455	3,829																													6,665							2,019															4,981	104,571
Yangon Region	28 December 2025	Hmawbi	52,843	17,219	11,121	10,048	6,451																		7,643																									5,696									5,599	116,620
Yangon Region	28 December 2025	Thingangyun	14,484	3,020	4,283	5,578	2,188																														6,060																						4,895; 3,231; 2,958	46,697
Yangon Region	28 December 2025	Thanlyin	49,731	12,104	13,499	16,656	10,057															7,053													5,740																									114,840
Yangon Region	28 December 2025	Ahlon	3,263	1,744	1,341	991																																																					2,656	9,995
Yangon Region	11 January 2026	Bahan	8,249	2,463	3,173	2,073	1,510																1,403																																				2,782	21,653
Yangon Region	11 January 2026	Pabedan	4,510	903	1,564	1,085	777																																																					8,839
Yangon Region	11 January 2026	Latha	2,150	1,557		1,072		598																																																			1,396	6,773
Yangon Region	11 January 2026	Kawhmu	30,623		12,991	4,080	4,787	3,799															3,426																																					59,706
Yangon Region	11 January 2026	Kungyangon	27,704		5,560	4,640	4,629	7,141				11,688																																																61,362
Yangon Region	11 January 2026	North Dagon	14,166	4,523	5,659	3,698	2,627	1,725															1,483															1,312																					4,717	39,910
Yangon Region	11 January 2026	Dawbon	8,412	2,217	2,493	1,710	1,352																																																				6,520	22,704
Yangon Region	11 January 2026	Pazundaung	4,809	3,504	1,778	1,705																																																						11,796
Yangon Region	11 January 2026	Hlaing	12,707	3,981	4,533	5,520	1,790	2,222																																																			3,627	34,380
Yangon Region	11 January 2026	Shwepyitha	40,347		11,805	10,167	4,972	5,750																														5,413						4,638															10,266; 5,411	98,769
Yangon Region	11 January 2026	Htantabin	42,024		9,176	4,934	3,022	2,447				15,541													3,156											4,235																								84,535
Yangon Region	11 January 2026	Hlegu	75,719	9,879	8,760	7,165	5,003	5,950																																																			12,432; 3,602	128,510
Yangon Region	11 January 2026	South Okkalapa	16,988	4,788	5,664	3,671	2,266																											3,974																									4,243	41,594
Yangon Region	11 January 2026	Cocokyun	1,487			37																																																						1,524
Yangon Region	11 January 2026	Kyimyindaing	4,756	1,246	1,522	906	2,194																																					621															14,396	25,641
Yangon Region	11 January 2026	Insein	28,203	5,309	5,542	5,875	4,767	2,294				11,459										3,314																													3,728								2,335	72,826
Yangon Region	25 January 2026	Dagon	6,106	833	929	607	491	358																																																				9,324
Yangon Region	25 January 2026	Lanmadaw	3,765	1,723	2,920	824																																																						9,232
Yangon Region	25 January 2026	Seikkyi Kanaungto	7,133		1,406	856	837	638				2,135																								2,741																								15,746
Yangon Region	25 January 2026	Dala	29,970	3,740	4,256	2,631	2,285	1,778				11,192																																																55,852
Yangon Region	25 January 2026	Dagon Seikkan	22,997	6,923	6,177	4,089	3,538	8,698																																												3,186								55,608
Yangon Region	25 January 2026	East Dagon	23,108	6,108	5,991	5,867	2,704	2,485																	3,586													5,263																						55,112
Yangon Region	25 January 2026	Mingala Taungnyunt	13,903	2,741	6,246		2,198	2,729															2,138											1,993																										31,948
Yangon Region	25 January 2026	Thaketa	24,196	7,114	7,238	5,480	4,722	4,768																																																			8,833	62,351
Yangon Region	25 January 2026	North Okkalapa	29,511	8,308	11,398	8,947		10,454																																																			13,353	81,971
Yangon Region	25 January 2026	Tamwe	14,785	3,282	4,937	2,365		2,066														2,338												1,666																										31,439
Yangon Region	25 January 2026	Yankin	7,992	1,995	3,273	1,297	1,583																																																				5,775	21,915
Yangon Region	25 January 2026	Kyauktan	45,668	13,230	13,156	12,318	13,425																																																					97,797
Yangon Region	25 January 2026	Kayan	47,578	21,862	15,609	8,427																																																						93,476
Yangon Region	25 January 2026	Thongwa	40,879	22,132	12,125	8,128	10,592																																																					93,856
Yangon Region	25 January 2026	Sanchaung	8,746		4,397		3,188															3,242																																						19,573
Yangon Region	25 January 2026	Hlaingthaya West	18,665	5,364	5,448	3,752	2,213					11,965										3,370													3,650																									54,427
Yangon Region	25 January 2026	Hlaingthaya East	17,373	5,831	3,044	2,503	2,296					8,170										2,382																																					2,720	44,319
Shan State	28 December 2025	Pindaya	22,412			4,843							19,867																																															47,122
Shan State	28 December 2025	Hopong	8,981			3,039			34,410																																																			46,430
Shan State	28 December 2025	Nawnghkio	22,104	5,620	4,905	1,748	4,092						10,163																																															48,632
Shan State	28 December 2025	Kengtung	33,414	4,654	3,486	2,375	9,878																																																					53,807
Shan State	28 December 2025	Tachileik	30,477	8,856			20,515																																																					59,848
Shan State	28 December 2025	Taunggyi	52,437	10,121	7,673	9,137	11,170	12,138	68,791																																					4,130													8,764	184,361
Shan State	28 December 2025	Nansang	23,128	2,105		1,529	10,207		3,609																																																			40,578
Shan State	28 December 2025	Mu Se	12,961				11,631																																																					24,592
Shan State	28 December 2025	Mong Hsat	29,491	3,965			4,937																																																					38,393
Shan State	28 December 2025	Lashio	19,584	5,150		1,830	6,821																																							2,232														35,617
Shan State	28 December 2025	Langkho	8,632				9,733																																																					18,365
Shan State	28 December 2025	Loilen	8,972	1,510			8,431		16,266																																																		832	36,011
Shan State	11 January 2026	Ywangan	13,214	4,199		2,531							30,312																																															50,256
Shan State	11 January 2026	Hsi Hseng	9,053			4,530			50,215																																																			63,798
Shan State	11 January 2026	Kalaw	36,826			8,476	11,413	14,313	34,444																																																			105,472
Shan State	11 January 2026	Mong Khet	8,588			1,592	1,892																																																					12,072
Shan State	11 January 2026	Mong Ping	20,659				4,565																																																					25,224
Shan State	11 January 2026	Mong Hpayak	13,296	1,055		508	2,626																																																					17,485
Shan State	11 January 2026	Lawksawk	42,371						15,418				21,123																																															78,912
Shan State	11 January 2026	Tangyan	20,596				11,191																																								6,303													38,090
Shan State	11 January 2026	Mongyai	10,607				5,398																																																					16,005
Shan State	11 January 2026	Kunhing	8,435				9,371																																																					17,806
Shan State	11 January 2026	Mong Ton	22,398				5,130																																																					27,528
Shan State	11 January 2026	Mong Yawng	12,404	1,970		898	6,464																																																					21,736
Shan State	11 January 2026	Mong Yang	4,211				866																																																					5,077
Shan State	11 January 2026	Mong Pan	5,342				4,359																																																					9,701
Shan State	11 January 2026	Mawkmai	7,024				1,312		5,700																																																			14,036
Shan State	11 January 2026	Mong Kung	9,577				12,377																																																					21,954
Shan State	11 January 2026	Lai-Hka	4,662	1,655			8,830																																																					15,147
Shan State	25 January 2026	Pinlaung	16,556			2,955	5,427		79,978																																																			104,916
Shan State	25 January 2026	Nyaungshwe	17,895		4,893	2,438	6,091	3,104	22,500								44,037																																											100,958
Shan State	25 January 2026	Kyaukme	9,560				5,999																																																					15,559
Shan State	25 January 2026	Hsipaw	7,235				9,613																																																					16,848
Shan State	25 January 2026	Mong Hsu	9,047				7,914																																																					16,961
Shan State	25 January 2026	Kyethi	9,180				11,028																																																					20,208
Shan State	—	Mong Nai					Unopposed																																																					—
Shan State	—	Matman	Unopposed																																																									—
Shan State	—	Pekon	Unopposed																																																									—
Shan State	—	Laukkaing	Election not held																																																									
Shan State	—	Namtu	Election not held																																																									
Shan State	—	Mantong	Election not held																																																									
Shan State	—	Mong La	Election not held																																																									
Shan State	—	Kutkai	Election not held																																																									
Shan State	—	Namhkam	Election not held																																																									
Shan State	—	Mabein	Election not held																																																									
Shan State	—	Mongmit	Election not held																																																									
Shan State	—	Pangsang	Election not held																																																									
Shan State	—	Namphan	Election not held																																																									
Shan State	—	Hsenwi	Election not held																																																									
Shan State	—	Kunlong	Election not held																																																									
Shan State	—	Konkyan	Election not held																																																									
Shan State	—	Namhsan	Election not held																																																									
Shan State	—	Hopang	Election not held																																																									
Shan State	—	Mongmao	Election not held																																																									
Shan State	—	Pangwaun	Election not held																																																									
Ayeyarwady Region	28 December 2025	Kyonpyaw	39,472	10,751	13,365	7,241	4,055	6,726			18,891																				8,169																													108,670
Ayeyarwady Region	28 December 2025	Pathein	57,206	13,198	11,251	15,391	5,827	6,804			12,965																				8,372																												8,012; 4,027	143,053
Ayeyarwady Region	28 December 2025	Maubin	82,966	14,682	17,997	6,743	6,982	7,046													8,678																																							145,094
Ayeyarwady Region	28 December 2025	Myaungmya	50,502	19,251	9,099	13,721	9,813	8,708			28,495																																																	139,589
Ayeyarwady Region	28 December 2025	Kyangin	14,920	17,695	9,277	4,803																																																						46,695
Ayeyarwady Region	28 December 2025	Myanaung	43,844	24,007	16,804	17,662																																																						102,317
Ayeyarwady Region	28 December 2025	Labutta	48,276	23,442	10,770	7,836	5,052	7,752			9,131																																																	112,259
Ayeyarwady Region	28 December 2025	Hinthada	56,976	24,121	17,254	10,626	6,186	9,292			10,774																																																	135,229
Ayeyarwady Region	11 January 2026	Kyaunggon	43,471	18,503		7,135		15,150																																																				84,259
Ayeyarwady Region	11 January 2026	Kangyidaunt	37,806	8,634	3,390	3,783	3,777	8,078			18,652										1,737										3,277																													89,134
Ayeyarwady Region	11 January 2026	Thabaung	29,502	15,550	9,843	6,286	4,794	10,333																																																				76,308
Ayeyarwady Region	11 January 2026	Kyaiklat	43,635	15,832	14,785	9,052	6,181	8,527																																																				98,012
Ayeyarwady Region	11 January 2026	Pyapon	49,189	12,672	10,567	9,591	4,822	8,780																																																			14,935	110,556
Ayeyarwady Region	11 January 2026	Bogale	62,412	29,257		11,692		14,570													9,551																																							127,482
Ayeyarwady Region	11 January 2026	Pantanaw	51,418	24,876	20,023	9,588	7,546	8,613																																																				122,064
Ayeyarwady Region	11 January 2026	Wakema	41,359	26,884	8,933	9,383	4,463	5,016			25,897										6,155																																							128,090
Ayeyarwady Region	11 January 2026	Einme	36,359	21,754	8,356	9,867	5,239	7,529																																																			9,588	98,692
Ayeyarwady Region	25 January 2026	Yekyi	42,564	9,536	5,801	4,277		4,843																																																			22,800	89,821
Ayeyarwady Region	25 January 2026	Ngapudaw	48,225	21,358		10,141	8,958	16,596																																																				105,278
Ayeyarwady Region	25 January 2026	Dedaye	46,029	12,937	11,713	4,907	4,119	6,309																																																			6,507	92,521
Ayeyarwady Region	25 January 2026	Nyaungdon	44,896	19,451	17,340	11,829	8,156	8,059																																																				109,731
Ayeyarwady Region	25 January 2026	Danubyu	32,215	12,806	22,233	5,529	6,417	7,132																																																				86,332
Ayeyarwady Region	25 January 2026	Ingapu	49,178	18,559	15,720	11,977		10,902																																																				106,336
Ayeyarwady Region	25 January 2026	Mawlamyinegyun	64,091	21,794	10,578	10,699	7,182	11,192																																																				125,536
Ayeyarwady Region	25 January 2026	Zalun	34,265	15,530	14,504	8,482		6,166																																																				78,947
Ayeyarwady Region	25 January 2026	Lemyethna	15,011	2,538	7,474	1,325	1,383																																																					27,731
Total			5,753,096	1,744,943	1,149,720	1,000,815	802,414	691,628	331,331	145,786	124,805	100,883	81,465	74,142	48,926	48,702	44,037	33,772	32,386	29,375	26,121	25,457	25,249	25,098	25,002	23,114	22,567	21,765	20,429	19,955	19,818	19,564	18,901	17,368	16,767	14,173	12,725	11,988	10,960	10,613	9,225	9,211	9,087	7,278	6,786	6,362	6,303	6,210	6,097	5,696	5,427	3,186	2,289	1,633	1,268	1,206	555	231	281,202	13,016,995

== Reactions ==
In March 2023, the governments of the United States, European Union, United Kingdom, Japan, France, Germany, and Australia strongly condemned the military junta's dissolution of the NLD and other political parties. The US and Germany stated they expect the election will not be free and fair. The German government posited that the junta's moves threaten to escalate violence in the country, and further destabilise the country. Japan's ministry of foreign affairs called for the release of all NLD officials, and noted the NLD's exclusion will hamper attempts to peacefully improve the country's political situation. Australia's Department of Foreign Affairs and Trade characterised the junta's moves as a "further narrowing of political space in Myanmar." The European Union reiterated its support for ASEAN's Five-Point Consensus. ASEAN also declared that it did not recognise the elections.
