= Myanmar Farmers Development Party =

Political party in Myanmar

Myanmar Farmers Development Party မြန်မာနိုင်ငံ တောင်သူလယ်သမား ဖွံ့ဖြိုးတိုးတက်ရေးပါတီ
- Chairman: Kyaw Swa Soe
- Vice Chairwoman: Khin Than Oo
- Founded: 6 November 2012
- Headquarters: Tamwe Township, Yangon, Myanmar
- Membership: 2,000
- Ideology: Agrarianism; Burmese nationalism
- Colours: Red
- Seats in the Amyotha Hluttaw: 0 / 224
- Seats in the Pyithu Hluttaw: 0 / 440
- Seats in the State and Regional Hluttaws: 0 / 880

Party flag

The Myanmar Farmers Development Party (Burmese: မြန်မာနိုင်ငံတောင်သူလယ်သမားဖွံ့ဖြိုးတိုးတက်ရေးပါတီ) is a political party in Myanmar (Burma). The party claims to have a membership of 2 million people, and had 286 candidates in the 2015 general election.

The party campaigns on supporting farmers in Myanmar, being focused on modernizing and expanding the agricultural sector of Myanmar. The party also supports creating a peaceful end to the civil war in the country.

The MFDP will participate nationwide in the 2025 Myanmar general election.

== Election results ==
=== House of Nationalities (Amyotha Hluttaw) ===
Election	Leader	Total seats won	Total votes	Share of votes	+/-	Status
2015	Kyaw Swa Soe	0 / 224	214,813	0.95%	New	Extra-parliamentary
2020	Kyaw Swa Soe	0 / 224	2,770	0.01%	0	Not recognised
2025–26	Kyaw Swa Soe	0 / 224	684,521	5.41%	0	Extra-parliamentary

=== House of Representatives (Pyithu Hluttaw) ===
Election	Leader	Total seats won	Total votes	Share of votes	+/-	Status
2020	Kyaw Swa Soe	0 / 440	173,420	0.77%	New	Extra-parliamentary
2020	Kyaw Swa Soe	0 / 440	4,447	0.02%	0	Not recognised
2025–26	Kyaw Swa Soe	0 / 440	691,628	5.31%	0	extra-parliamentary
