= People's Party of Myanmar Farmers and Workers =

People's Party of Myanmar Farmers and Workers မြန်မာနိုင်ငံ တောင်သူလယ်သမား အလုပ်သမား ပြည်သူ့ပါတီ
- Abbreviation: PPMFW
- Chairman: U Aung Myo Khine
- Founded: 9 December 2014
- Headquarters: Pathein, Ayeyarwady Region
- Ideology: Agrarianism
- Colours: Yellow, red, and green
- Seats in the Amyotha Hluttaw: 0 / 224
- Seats in the Pyithu Hluttaw: 0 / 440
- Seats in the State and Regional Hluttaws: 0 / 850

Party flag

The People's Party of Myanmar Farmers and Workers (PPMFW) is a registered political party in Myanmar (Burma).

The party seeks to represent farmers and workers in Myanmar, and their main goals include compensating those who have lost land to the government, providing new equipment and technical upgrades to farmers, and redistributing corporate and government owned land to "those [farmers] who are actually working on the land."

== Election results ==
=== House of Nationalities (Amyotha Hluttaw) ===
Election	Leader	Total seats won	Total votes	Share of votes	+/-	Status
2015	U Aung Myo Khine	0 / 224	6,294	0.03%	New	Extra-parliamentary
2020	U Aung Myo Khine	0 / 224	15,308	0.06%	0	Not recognised
2025–26	U Aung Myo Khine	0 / 224	Did not contest			Extra-parliamentary

=== House of Representatives (Pyithu Hluttaw) ===
Election	Leader	Total seats won	Total votes	Share of votes	+/-	Status
2015	U Aung Myo Khine	0 / 440	7,965	0.04%	New	Extra-parliamentary
2020	U Aung Myo Khine	0 / 440	3,489	0.01%	0	Not recognised
2025–26	U Aung Myo Khine	0 / 440	19,818	0.15%	0	Extra-parliamentary
