= Tai-Leng Nationalities Development Party =

Tai-Leng Nationalities Development Party တိုင်းလိုင်(ရှမ်းနီ)အမျိုးသားများ ဖွံ့ဖြိုးတိုးတက်ရေးပါတီ
- Abbreviation: TNDP / TLDNP
- Chairman: U Sai Htay Aung
- Secretary-General: U Sai Hlaing Myint Oo
- Founded: 10 May 2012 (13 years ago)
- Headquarters: Chanmyathazi Township, Mandalay Region, Myanmar
- Membership: 3,500+
- Ideology: Red Shan (Shan-ni) interests Federalism
- Colours: Red, Green, Yellow
- Seats in the Amyotha Hluttaw: 1 / 224
- Seats in the Pyithu Hluttaw: 0 / 440
- Seats in the Sagaing Region Hluttaw: 1 / 101
- Ethnic Affairs Ministers: 1 / 29

Party flag

The Tai-Leng Nationalities Development Party (Burmese: တိုင်းလိုင်(ရှမ်းနီ)အမျိုးသားများ ဖွံ့ဖြိုးတိုးတက်ရေးပါတီ; abbreviated TNDP or TLNDP), also known as the Shanni Nationalities Development Party (SNDP), is a minor political party in Myanmar (Burma). The party seeks to represent the Shan-ni people (also known as the Red Shan), who live in Kachin State and northern Sagaing Region.

== Election results ==
=== House of Nationalities (Amyotha Hluttaw) ===
Election	Leader	Total seats won	Total votes	Share of votes	+/-	Status
2015	U Sai Htay Aung	0 / 224	70,479	0.31%	New	Extra-parliamentary
2020	U Sai Htay Aung	0 / 224	54,398	0.20%	0	Not recognised
2025–26	U Sai Htay Aung	1 / 224	29,691	0.23%	▲1	TBA

=== House of Representatives (Pyithu Hluttaw) ===
Election	Leader	Total seats won	Total votes	Share of votes	+/-	Status
2015	U Sai Htay Aung	0 / 440	62,907	0.28%	New	Extra-parliamentary
2020	U Sai Htay Aung	0 / 440	58,065	0.22%	0	Not recognised
2025–26	U Sai Htay Aung	0 / 440	29,375	0.23%	0	Extra-parliamentary
