= Hla Swe =

Burmese politician (born in 1960)

- လှဆွေ

Member-elect of the Pyithu Hluttaw for Pobbathiri, Naypyidaw
- Assuming office 16 March 2026
- Succeeding: Vacant

Member of the House of Nationalities
- In office 31 January 2011 – 29 January 2016
- Preceded by: Position established
- Succeeded by: Pyuu Lwin
- Constituency: Magwe Region № 12; Gangaw Township

Personal details
- Born: 28 September 1960 (age 66) Chauk, Myanmar
- Party: Union Solidarity and Development Party
- Spouse: Thida
- Children: Thiha Swe; Hla Myat Chel; Aye Mya Thida Swe
- Parent(s): Boe Thar (father); Than Kyi (mother)
- Occupation: Politician

Military service
- Allegiance: Myanmar
- Branch/service: Myanmar Army
- Years of service: 1978–2003
- Rank: Lieutenant Colonel

Hla Swe (Burmese: လှဆွေ, also known as Bullet Hla Swe; born 28 September 1960) is a Burmese politician who served as an MP in the House of Nationalities for Magwe Region № 12 constituency from 2011 to 2016, and is a member-elect of the Pyithu Hluttaw.

After he ended up his term length in the Parliament in 2016, he published a weekly newspaper The Bullet News Journal.

Hla Swe is also notorious for his involvement in forming and equipping the Pyusawhti militias in central Myanmar in the aftermath of the 2021 Myanmar coup d'état to oppose anti-junta troops and the People's Defence Force.

== Early life and education ==
Hla Swe was born in military base in Chauk, Magway Region to parents Boe Thar and his wife Than Kyi. His father, Boe Thar was a former military officer. He attended Basic Education High School No. 1 Kyaukse and straight out of high school in 1978.

== Military and governmental career ==
Hla Swe joined the Myanmar Army in 1978 and most of his 25 years of service was spent fighting armed ethnic groups in border areas. In 2003, he took up an administrative role for the State Peace and Development Council military government in Gangaw Township, Magwe Region. In 2006, he was retired as a lieutenant colonel in Myanmar Army and took up the post of director of Myanmar Radio and Television.

== Political career ==
He served as a central executive committee member of the Union Solidarity and Development Party. In 2010 election, he was elected as an MP for House of Nationalities. He is clearly pro-military, he believes the Tatmadaw should gradually ease its grip on parliament. He earned the nickname Bullet in 2013 after suggesting that civil conflict in northern Myanmar's Kachin State might best be resolved by bullets if diplomacy failed.

In 2015 election, he run for House of Nationalities seat from Gangaw Township constituency, but lost to National League for Democracy (NLD) candidate.

On 9 November 2022, in the aftermath of the 2021 Myanmar coup d'état, he became the chairman of the Naypyidaw Council of the USDP. Hla Swe led a rally outside Yangon City Hall in July 2022, backing the junta's execution of pro-democracy activists Kyaw Min Yu, Phyo Zeya Thaw, Hla Myo Aung, and Aung Thura Zaw. The regime ensured security for the protest.

In 2023, he founded a group of Pyusawhti militias in his hardcore supporter village, Myaung Khinyan, located in Gangaw. On TikTok, he often posted videos to personally attack jailed civilian leader Aung San Suu Kyi. In one video, he claimed that Galon U Saw should have assassinated her father, General Aung San, earlier so Aung San Suu Kyi wouldn't be born and 'destroy Myanmar.

In July 2024, he made a goodwill visit to China as a representative of the USDP, at the invitation of the Chinese Communist Party.

On 5 October 2025, Hla Swe criticized the publication of voter rolls for the 2025 Myanmar general election in a video posted on social media by claiming the rolls from the 2020 Myanmar general election contained over 300 errors. Although the video was deleted by October 6, it was reposted various times. The State Security and Peace Commission junta criminalizes speech that "disrupts" elections.

Hla Swe ran and was elected as the USDP candidate for Pyithu Hluttaw in Pobbathiri Township, Naypyidaw Union Territory, in the 2025–26 Myanmar general election, considered a sham process by independent observers.

== Arrest ==
On August 7, 2019, Kyauktada township deputy administrator Myo Myint filed a complaint against Hla Swe with the township court for allegedly condemning state leaders while speaking at a rally against the US imposition of visa sanctions on Myanmar military leaders in front of Yangon City Hall on August 3. He told supporters in the speech, “If the United States came and bombed government ministries, I would accept that. Hey bombers, try it. If all [state leaders] died, that would be good”.

Hla Swe was sued for sedition under Article 124(a) on 8 August 2019. The arrest warrant was issued with an address in Magwe Region, where he lives. If he is prosecuted under this article, he faces seven to 20 years in prison or a fine. On 28 December 2020, he surrendered himself to the Yangon Western District Police Station after absconding for over one year. His charge was dropped on 11 May 2021 by State Administration Council in the aftermath of the 2021 Myanmar coup d'état.

== Public image ==
In 1980–1981, as a military officer, he had deliberately forced LGBTs to serve as military porters, a practice internationally criticised as a war crime. He supported the crackdown by Myanmar Army in 1988 Pro-Democracy Protests which resulted in 3,000 estimated deaths. In 2015, he generated controversy for posting on social media about his hatred for LGBTs.

He courted controversy during the run-up to 2015 election by playing on anti-Rohingya sentiment to win the election. He blamed his defeat on 2015 election not on the success of his NLD rival, but on Aung San, Father of the Nation of modern-day Myanmar.

== Quotes ==
“I think I am too old for politics. Look at our politicians, they are all around 70, there needs to be a younger generation of politicians. But if my party wants me to run, I will run.”

“The situation today is good, we should not go back to the past, but should move forward towards democracy.”
