= New Democratic Party (Kachin) =

New Democratic Party (Kachin) ဒီမိုကရေစီပါတီသစ် (ကချင်)
- Leader: Zahkung Ting Ying
- Founded: 29 August 2019; 6 years ago
- Registered: 3
- Legalised: 25 April 2023
- Headquarters: Pang War, Chipwi Township, Kachin State

The New Democratic Party (Kachin) (Burmese: ဒီမိုကရေစီပါတီသစ် (ကချင်) ပါတီ; abbreviated NDP (Kachin)) is a political party in Kachin State, Myanmar, that was founded in 2019. The party officially registered on August 29, 2019, receiving registration number 119.

== Party registration ==
Under the 2023 Political Parties Registration Law, the NDP (Kachin) re-registered with the Union Election Commission and was allowed to register as a political party on April 25, 2023, under Registration Number 3.

== Election results ==
=== Amyotha Hluttaw ===
Election	Leader	Total seats won	Total votes	Share of votes	+/–	Government
2020	Zahkung Ting Ying	1 / 224	9,245	0.03%	New	Not recognised
2025–26	Zahkung Ting Ying	0 / 224	8,421	0.07%	▼1	Extra-parliamentary

=== Pyithu Hluttaw ===
Election	Leader	Total seats won	Total votes	Share of votes	+/–	Government
2020	Zahkung Ting Ying	0 / 440	3,992	0.01%	New	Not recognised
2025–26	Zahkung Ting Ying	0 / 224	10,613	0.08%	0	Extra-parliamentary

== See also ==
- New Democratic Army – Kachin
