= Naga National Party =

Political party in Manipur, India

The Naga National Party (NNP) is a political party in the Indian state of Manipur. It works amongst the Naga majority in the state. The party favors negotiated settlements of the conflicts in the North-East, unification of Naga groups, and maintaining Naga identity.

The party is in the list of 'Registered Unrecognised political parties' announced by the Election Commission of India. The president of the NNP is Ngathingkhui Hungyo. Its headquarters is situated at Church Road, Dewlahland, Imphal, Manipur.

== Identical name ==
There is another Naga National Party in Myanmar which is different from the Manipuri outfit.

== History ==
In 1980, the then Naga National Party (NNP) joined with the faction of another regional party, United Democratic Front (UDF) and formed Naga National Democratic Party (NNDP). They brought down the 48-day-old S.C. Jamir ministry of the Congress (i) and J.B. Jasokie, as the head of NNDP became the chief minister. After being dormant and virtually invisible for many years, the party name was once again in news during the 2002 elections as a new outfit.

In 2004, Ng Hungyo planned to contest the Outer Manipur Lok Sabha constituency election and the party took part in both 2002 and 2007 Manipur Legislative Assembly election. In 2007, party candidate, Hungyo's wife and journalist Valley Rose Hungyo contested the Phungyar Assembly constituency but could only finish third. She also contested the Outer Manipur MP seat in the 1996 as a Samata Party candidate, in 2000 and 2004 as NPP candidate, and the 2009 Lok Sabha election as an independent.

In November 2005, Naga National Party said that a survey it conducted in hill districts of Manipur showed that the Naga people in the districts preferred the districts to merge with Nagaland.
