= List of tallest buildings in Yangon =

This is a list of the tallest buildings in Yangon, the most populous city of Myanmar. The list includes skyscrapers and high-rise building standing at or above 90 metres (295 ft) but excludes other tall structures such as the Shwedagon Pagoda in the city proper, or buildings elsewhere in the Yangon Region, such as those in Thanlyin.

Yangon has the vast majority of the tallest buildings in the country. The city currently does not have a single skyscraper exceeding 150 metres (492 ft) in height as defined by the Council on Tall Buildings and Urban Habitat and will not have one as long as the current zoning regulations, which cap the maximum height at 127 metres (417 ft) above sea level, (75% of the Shwedagon Pagoda's sea level height) remain in place. The regulations came into effect after a proposal to build a 195 m (640 ft) tower in downtown Yangon was defeated by local conservationists in 2014.

== Tallest buildings ==
The following list ranks completed buildings in Yangon that stand about 90 metres (295 ft) or taller based on the estimates by Emporis, unless otherwise stated. Because of its use of Emporis's estimates, the list may not be fully accurate—in terms of inclusion and rankings. (Emporis estimates the height of buildings based on the number of floors; as a result, buildings with the same number of floors—regardless of the type (office or residential)—are estimated at the same height. (Note: See Emporis's estimates for Yangon buildings here: .)) The estimated heights are given in italics.

Rank	Name	Image	Location	Height: m (ft)	Floors	Year	Notes	Reference
1	Diamond Inya Palace		Mayangon	122 m (400 ft)	34	2019		
2	M Tower		Kamayut	111.2 m (365 ft)	27	2020		
3	Golden City Tower I		Yankin	109.7 m (360 ft)	33	2016	Phase 1	
3	Golden City Tower II		Yankin	109.7 m (360 ft)	33	2016	Phase 1	
3	Golden City Tower III		Yankin	109.7 m (360 ft)	33	2016	Phase 1	
3	Golden City Tower IV		Yankin	109.7 m (360 ft)	33	2016	Phase 1	
3	Golden City Tower V		Yankin	109.7 m (360 ft)	33	2018	Phase 2	
3	Golden City Tower VI		Yankin	109.7 m (360 ft)	33	2018	Phase 2	
3	Golden City Tower VII		Yankin	109.7 m (360 ft)	33	2018	Phase 2	
10	Times City Office Tower I		Kamayut	105 m (344 ft)	25	2019		(Note: Emporis "Tallest Buildings in Yangon". EMPORIS. Archived from the original on April 11, 2020. estimates 90 metres (300 ft) but according to iMyanmar House each office floor is 4.2 metres (14 ft) high, meaning the building is at least 105 metres (344 ft) tall.)
11	Lotte Hotel Yangon Residences		Hlaing	104 m (341 ft)	29	2017		
10=	Sedona Hotel Inya Wing		Yankin	104 m (341 ft)	29	2016		
13	Sakura Tower		Kyauktada	100 m (328 ft)	20	1999		
14	Kaba Aye Executive Residence		Mayangon	97 m (318 ft)	27	2016		
14=	Paragon Residence		Ahlon	97 m (318 ft)	27	2018		
14=	Myanmar Plaza I		Bahan	97 m (318 ft)	27	2015		
14=	Myanmar Plaza II		Bahan	97 m (318 ft)	27	2015		
14=	The Central Tower I		Yankin	97 m (318 ft)	27	2020	Kaba Aye Pagoda Road	
19	Kanthaya Center Office Tower		Mingala Taungnyunt	92.4 m (303 ft)	22	2019		(Note: Emporis "Tallest Buildings in Yangon". EMPORIS. Archived from the original on April 11, 2020. estimates Kanthaya Center 1's height as 82.5 metres (271 ft) but according to iMyanmar House each floor is 4.2 metres (14 ft) high, and the office building consists of 22 above ground floors, meaning the building is at least 92.4 metres (303 ft) tall.)
20	Pyay Garden		Sanchaung	90 m (295 ft)	25	2013		
19=	Centrepoint Office Tower		Kyauktada	90 m (295 ft)	25	2012	Construction began in 1995	
19=	Pullman Centrepoint Hotel		Kyauktada	90 m (295 ft)	25	2014	Construction began in 1995	
20=	Kanthaya Center IV		Mingala Taungnyunt	90 m (295 ft)	25	2019		
20=	Pan Pacific Hotel		Pabedan	90 m (295 ft)	25	2017		
20=	Crystal Residences		Kamayut	90 m (295 ft)	25	2017		
19=	Kanbe Tower A		Yankin	90 m (295 ft)	25	2020		
19=	Kanbe Tower B		Yankin	90 m (295 ft)	25	2020		
19=	Kanbe Tower C		Yankin	90 m (295 ft)	25	2020		

== Tallest under construction ==
The list below covers the buildings under construction that will be 90 metres (300 ft) or taller. The height estimates are by Emporis unless otherwise stated. The estimated heights are given in italics.

Name	Image	Location	Height: m (ft)	Floors	Year (est.)	Notes	Reference
Lake Suites I		Bahan	114.8 m (377 ft)	32	2021	Phase 2 of Myanmar Plaza development broke ground in 2016	(Note: Estimated height on 32 stories only. Emporis The Lake Suites 1 Yangon Myanmar, Emporis, archived from the original on May 14, 2021 gives 34 stories and estimates its height as 122 m (400 ft). However, according to Tin Yadana Htun (2015-09-03). "Lake Suites launches second tower"., the tallest three towers are 32 stories only. This means Emporis' estimate needs to be adjusted to 32 floors, and 114.8 m (377 ft).)
Lake Suites II		Bahan	114.8 m (377 ft)	32	2021	Phase 2 of Myanmar Plaza development broke ground in 2016	(Note: Estimated height on 32 stories only. Emporis The Lake Suites 1 Yangon Myanmar, Emporis, archived from the original on May 14, 2021 gives 34 stories and estimates its height as 122 m (400 ft). However, according to Tin Yadana Htun (2015-09-03). "Lake Suites launches second tower"., the tallest three towers are 32 stories only. This means Emporis' estimate needs to be adjusted to 32 floors, and 114.8 m (377 ft).)
Lake Suites III		Bahan	114.8 m (377 ft)	32	2021	Phase 2 of Myanmar Plaza development broke ground in 2016	(Note: Estimated height on 32 stories only. Emporis The Lake Suites 1 Yangon Myanmar, Emporis, archived from the original on May 14, 2021 gives 34 stories and estimates its height as 122 m (400 ft). However, according to Tin Yadana Htun (2015-09-03). "Lake Suites launches second tower"., the tallest three towers are 32 stories only. This means Emporis' estimate needs to be adjusted to 32 floors, and 114.8 m (377 ft).)
Emerald Bay I		Thaketa	?	32	2022	2x32-story buildings; 3x29-story buildings	(Note: See "Emerald Bay Project". CQHP, Republic of the Union of Myanmar. for the overall project scope. "Phase 1 of Emerald Bay High-Class Condominium to be completed in 2022". Eleven Media Group.)
Emerald Bay II		Thaketa	?	32	2022	2x32-story buildings; 3x29-story buildings	(Note: See "Emerald Bay Project". CQHP, Republic of the Union of Myanmar. for the overall project scope. "Phase 1 of Emerald Bay High-Class Condominium to be completed in 2022". Eleven Media Group.)
Inno City III		South Okkalapa	108.8 m (357 ft)	30	2021		(Note: The official height of 108.8 m (357 feet) per "Inno City" (in Burmese). The Myanmar Builders Guide.. Emporis' estimate is 107.5 m (353 feet).)
Inno City IV		South Okkalapa	108.8 m (357 ft)	30	2021		(Note: The official height of 108.8 m (357 feet) per "Inno City" (in Burmese). The Myanmar Builders Guide.. Emporis' estimate is 107.5 m (353 feet).)
Inno City V		South Okkalapa	108.8 m (357 ft)	30	2021		(Note: The official height of 108.8 m (357 feet) per "Inno City" (in Burmese). The Myanmar Builders Guide.. Emporis' estimate is 107.5 m (353 feet).)
Inno City I		South Okkalapa	104 m (341 ft)	29	2021		
Inno City II		South Okkalapa	104 m (341 ft)	29	2021		
Emerald Bay III		Thaketa	?	29	2022	2x32-story buildings; 3x29-story buildings	(Note: See "Emerald Bay Project". CQHP, Republic of the Union of Myanmar. for the overall project scope. "Phase 1 of Emerald Bay High-Class Condominium to be completed in 2022". Eleven Media Group.)
Emerald Bay IV		Thaketa	?	29	2022	2x32-story buildings; 3x29-story buildings	(Note: See "Emerald Bay Project". CQHP, Republic of the Union of Myanmar. for the overall project scope. "Phase 1 of Emerald Bay High-Class Condominium to be completed in 2022". Eleven Media Group.)
Emerald Bay V		Thaketa	?	29	2022	2x32-story buildings; 3x29-story buildings	(Note: See "Emerald Bay Project". CQHP, Republic of the Union of Myanmar. for the overall project scope. "Phase 1 of Emerald Bay High-Class Condominium to be completed in 2022". Eleven Media Group.)
Kajima Garden Hotel		Yankin	?	29		Hotel plus a 22-story hotel and a 21-story office	
Infinity Condominium		Bahan	100.5 m (330 ft)	28	2021		
The Central Tower II		Yankin	97 m (318 ft)	27	2020	Kaba Aye Pagoda Road	
The Central Tower III		Yankin	97 m (318 ft)	27	2020	Kaba Aye Pagoda Road	
The Central Tower IV		Yankin	97 m (318 ft)	27	2020	Kaba Aye Pagoda Road	
68 Residence		Bahan	93 m (305 ft)	26	2020	At Saya San and Kaba Aye Pagoda Roads	
Peninsula Residences		Kyauktada	93 m (305 ft)	26		Burma Railway Headquarters redevelopment	
Landmark Towers III		Kyauktada	93 m (305 ft)	26	2021	Burma Railway Headquarters redevelopment	
Landmark Towers IV		Kyauktada	90 m (295 ft)	25	2021	Burma Railway Headquarters redevelopment	

== Timeline of tallest buildings ==
As many exact heights are unknown, the timeline below may be incomplete. Estimated heights are given in italics.

Name	Image	Location	Height: m (ft)	Floors	Years as tallest	Notes	Reference
Asia Plaza Hotel		Kyauktada	58.5 m (192 ft)	17	1988–1996		(Note: Skyscraper Page, "Asia Plaza Hotel". Skyscraper Page., reports its floor count as 17 and 58.5 metres (192 ft). Emporis, "Asia Plaza Hotel". Emporis., estimates it as 16 stories and 57.5 metres (189 ft). The discrepancy in the floor count may be that Emporis simply uses the floor number of the topmost floor, 16, without accounting for the ground floor.)
Sule Shangri-La Hotel		Kyauktada	80.5 m (264 ft)	22	1996–1999	Formerly, Traders Hotel	
Sakura Tower		Kyauktada	100 m (328 ft)	20	1999–2016		(Note: According to the tower's web site, "About Sakura Tower". 2020-04-16., it is a 100 m (330 ft) high 20-story tower, completed in 1999. A 2014 National Geographic article, "The Race to Save Architecture in Myanmar's Biggest City". The National Geographic. 2014-11-13., identifies the Sakura Tower as the tallest building in Yangon.)
Sedona Hotel Inya Wing		Yankin	104 m (341 ft)	29	2016		
Golden City Tower I		Yankin	109.7 m (360 ft)	33	2016–2019		
Golden City Tower II		Yankin	109.7 m (360 ft)	33	2016–2019		
Golden City Tower III		Yankin	109.7 m (360 ft)	33	2016–2019		
Golden City Tower IV		Yankin	109.7 m (360 ft)	33	2016–2019		
Golden City Tower V		Yankin	109.7 m (360 ft)	33	2018–2019		
Golden City Tower VI		Yankin	109.7 m (360 ft)	33	2018–2019		
Golden City Tower VII		Yankin	109.7 m (360 ft)	33	2018–2019		
Diamond Inya Palace		Mayangon	122 m (400 ft)	34	2019–present		

== See also ==
- List of tallest structures in Myanmar
- List of tallest buildings in Myanmar

== External sources ==
- Committee for Quality Control of High Rise Building Construction Projects, Republic of the Union of Myanmar
