= List of tallest buildings in Myanmar =

This list ranks the tallest skyscrapers and high-rises in Myanmar by height. It includes habitable buildings that stand at least 90 m (295 ft) tall but excludes non-habitable structures above 90 m, such as the Yeywa Dam, the Laykyun Sekkya Buddha Statue, and the Shwemawdaw Pagoda. For other tall structures, see List of tallest structures in Myanmar.

As of 2025, Myanmar is the largest country in Southeast Asia and ASEAN to have no skyscrapers exceeding 150 meters in height as defined by the Council on Tall Buildings and Urban Habitat. Most of the tallest buildings are located in Yangon where zoning regulations restrict the maximum height of buildings to 127 m (417 ft) above sea level, to ensure that no structure overtakes the height of Shwedagon Pagoda. The tallest skyscraper in Myanmar is currently the Diamond Inya Palace in Yangon, which is 122 m (400 ft) tall.

The country's first ever attempt to construct a skyscraper taller than 150 meters was the proposed 555 Merchant Street, a 195 m (640 ft) building planned for downtown Yangon. The project faced intense opposition by local conservationists and was cancelled in 2014. There were also plans for a 520 m (1,706 ft), 108-story skyscraper called Time 108 City, which would have been the second-tallest building in Southeast Asia and ASEAN after the 679-meter Merdeka 118 in Kuala Lumpur, Malaysia. It is currently unknown whether this project has been cancelled.

== Tallest buildings ==
The following list ranks completed skyscrapers and high-rises in Myanmar that stand at least 90 m (295 ft) based on the estimates by Emporis, unless otherwise stated. Because of the Emporis estimates, the list may not be fully accurate—in terms of inclusion and rankings. (Emporis estimates the height of buildings based on the number of floors; as a result, buildings with the same number of floors—regardless of the type (office or residential)—are estimated at the same height. (Note: See Emporis's estimates for Yangon buildings here: .)) Height estimates are denoted in italics.

The list may not be up-to-date.

Was the tallest building in Myanmar upon completion

Rank	Name	Image	Location	Height: m (ft)	Floors	Year	Notes	References
1	Diamond Inya Palace		Yangon	122 m (400 ft)	34	2019	Tallest buildings in Myanmar (2019–present)	
2	M Tower		Yangon	111.2 m (365 ft)	27	2020		
=2	Grand Park Hotel		Mandalay	111.2 m (365 ft)	31	2019	Tallest building in Mandalay	
4	Golden City Tower I		Yangon	109.7 m (360 ft)	33	2016	Tallest buildings in Myanmar (2016–2019)	
4	Golden City Tower II		Yangon	109.7 m (360 ft)	33	2016	Tallest buildings in Myanmar (2016–2019)	
4	Golden City Tower III		Yangon	109.7 m (360 ft)	33	2016	Tallest buildings in Myanmar (2016–2019)	
4	Golden City Tower IV		Yangon	109.7 m (360 ft)	33	2016	Tallest buildings in Myanmar (2016–2019)	
4	Golden City Tower V		Yangon	109.7 m (360 ft)	33	2018	Tallest buildings in Myanmar (2018–2019)	
4	Golden City Tower VI		Yangon	109.7 m (360 ft)	33	2018	Tallest buildings in Myanmar (2018–2019)	
4	Golden City Tower VII		Yangon	109.7 m (360 ft)	33	2018	Tallest buildings in Myanmar (2018–2019)	
11	Times City Office Tower I		Yangon	105 m (344 ft)	25	2019		(Note: Emporis "Tallest Buildings in Yangon". EMPORIS. Archived from the original on April 11, 2020. estimates 90 m but according to iMyanmar House each office floor is 4.2 meters high, meaning the building is at least 105 meters tall.)
12	Lotte Hotel Yangon Residences		Yangon	104 m (341 ft)	29	2017		
12=	Sedona Hotel Inya Wing		Yangon	104 m (341 ft)	29	2016	Tallest building in Myanmar in 2016	
14	Sakura Tower		Yangon	100 m (328 ft)	20	1999	Tallest building in Myanmar 1999–2016	
15	Kaba Aye Executive Residence		Yangon	97 m (318 ft)	27	2016		
15=	Paragon Residence		Yangon	97 m (318 ft)	27	2018		
15=	Myanmar Plaza I		Yangon	97 m (318 ft)	27	2015		
15=	Myanmar Plaza II		Yangon	97 m (318 ft)	27	2015		
15=	The Central Tower I		Yangon	97 m (318 ft)	27	2020	Kaba Aye Pagoda Road	
20	Kanthaya Center Office Tower		Yangon	92.4 m (303 ft)	22	2019		(Note: Emporis "Tallest Buildings in Yangon". EMPORIS. Archived from the original on April 11, 2020. estimates Kanthaya Center 1's height as 82.5 meters but according to iMyanmar House each floor is 4.2 meters high, and the office building consists of 22 above ground floors, meaning the building is at least 92.4 meters tall.)
21	Star City I		Thanlyin	91 m (299 ft)	28	2019		(Note: Per the building contractor, "A new project for Bouygues Construction in Myanmar"., the complex consists of two 91-meter tall 28-story towers, and four 82-meter tall 25-story buildings.)
21	Star City II		Thanlyin	91 m (299 ft)	28	2019		(Note: Per the building contractor, "A new project for Bouygues Construction in Myanmar"., the complex consists of two 91-meter tall 28-story towers, and four 82-meter tall 25-story buildings.)
23	Pyay Garden		Yangon	90 m (295 ft)	25	2013		
23=	Centrepoint Office Tower		Yangon	90 m (295 ft)	25	2012		
23=	Pullman Centrepoint Hotel		Yangon	90 m (295 ft)	25	2014		
23=	Man Myanmar Plaza I		Mandalay	90 m (295 ft)	25	2014	Tallest buildings in Mandalay, 2014–2019	
23=	Man Myanmar Plaza II		Mandalay	90 m (295 ft)	25	2014	Tallest buildings in Mandalay, 2014–2019	
23=	Kanthaya Center IV		Yangon	90 m (295 ft)	25	2019		
23=	Pan Pacific Hotel		Yangon	90 m (295 ft)	25	2017		
23=	Crystal Residences		Yangon	90 m (295 ft)	25	2017		
23=	Kanbe Tower A		Yangon	90 m (295 ft)	25	2020		
23=	Kanbe Tower B		Yangon	90 m (295 ft)	25	2020		
23=	Kanbe Tower C		Yangon	90 m (295 ft)	25	2020		

== Tallest under construction ==
The list below covers the buildings under construction that will be 90 meters or taller. Height estimates are denoted in italics, and are sourced from Emporis unless otherwise stated. Given the dynamic nature of the topic, the list may not be up to date, and is likely incomplete.

Name	Image	Location	Height: m (ft)	Floors	Year (est.)	Notes	References
Lake Suites I		Yangon	114.8 m (377 ft)	32	2021	Phase 2 of Myanmar Plaza development broke ground in 2016	(Note: Estimated height on 32 stories only. Emporis The Lake Suites 1 Yangon Myanmar, Emporis, archived from the original on May 14, 2021 gives 34 stories and estimates its height as 122 m (400 ft). However, according to Tin Yadana Htun (2015-09-03). "Lake Suites launches second tower"., the tallest three towers are 32 stories only. This means Emporis' estimate needs to be adjusted to 32 floors, and 114.8 m (377 ft).)
Lake Suites II		Yangon	114.8 m (377 ft)	32	2021	Phase 2 of Myanmar Plaza development broke ground in 2016	(Note: Estimated height on 32 stories only. Emporis The Lake Suites 1 Yangon Myanmar, Emporis, archived from the original on May 14, 2021 gives 34 stories and estimates its height as 122 m (400 ft). However, according to Tin Yadana Htun (2015-09-03). "Lake Suites launches second tower"., the tallest three towers are 32 stories only. This means Emporis' estimate needs to be adjusted to 32 floors, and 114.8 m (377 ft).)
Lake Suites III		Yangon	114.8 m (377 ft)	32	2021	Phase 2 of Myanmar Plaza development broke ground in 2016	(Note: Estimated height on 32 stories only. Emporis The Lake Suites 1 Yangon Myanmar, Emporis, archived from the original on May 14, 2021 gives 34 stories and estimates its height as 122 m (400 ft). However, according to Tin Yadana Htun (2015-09-03). "Lake Suites launches second tower"., the tallest three towers are 32 stories only. This means Emporis' estimate needs to be adjusted to 32 floors, and 114.8 m (377 ft).)
Emerald Bay I		Yangon	?	32	2022	2x32-story buildings; 3x29-story buildings	(Note: See "Emerald Bay Project". CQHP, Republic of the Union of Myanmar. for the overall project scope. "Phase 1 of Emerald Bay High-Class Condominium to be completed in 2022". Eleven Media Group.)
Emerald Bay II		Yangon	?	32	2022	2x32-story buildings; 3x29-story buildings	(Note: See "Emerald Bay Project". CQHP, Republic of the Union of Myanmar. for the overall project scope. "Phase 1 of Emerald Bay High-Class Condominium to be completed in 2022". Eleven Media Group.)
Inno City III		Yangon	108.8 m (357 ft)	30	2021		(Note: The official height of 108.8 m (357 feet) per "Inno City" (in Burmese). The Myanmar Builders Guide.. Emporis' estimate is 107.5 m (353 feet).)
Inno City IV		Yangon	108.8 m (357 ft)	30	2021		(Note: The official height of 108.8 m (357 feet) per "Inno City" (in Burmese). The Myanmar Builders Guide.. Emporis' estimate is 107.5 m (353 feet).)
Inno City V		Yangon	108.8 m (357 ft)	30	2021		(Note: The official height of 108.8 m (357 feet) per "Inno City" (in Burmese). The Myanmar Builders Guide.. Emporis' estimate is 107.5 m (353 feet).)
Inno City I		Yangon	104 m (341 ft)	29	2021		
Inno City II		Yangon	104 m (341 ft)	29	2021		
Emerald Bay III		Yangon	?	29	2022	2x32-story buildings; 3x29-story buildings	(Note: See "Emerald Bay Project". CQHP, Republic of the Union of Myanmar. for the overall project scope. "Phase 1 of Emerald Bay High-Class Condominium to be completed in 2022". Eleven Media Group.)
Emerald Bay IV		Yangon	?	29	2022	2x32-story buildings; 3x29-story buildings	(Note: See "Emerald Bay Project". CQHP, Republic of the Union of Myanmar. for the overall project scope. "Phase 1 of Emerald Bay High-Class Condominium to be completed in 2022". Eleven Media Group.)
Emerald Bay V		Yangon	?	29	2022	2x32-story buildings; 3x29-story buildings	(Note: See "Emerald Bay Project". CQHP, Republic of the Union of Myanmar. for the overall project scope. "Phase 1 of Emerald Bay High-Class Condominium to be completed in 2022". Eleven Media Group.)
Kajima Garden Hotel		Yangon	?	29		Hotel plus a 22-story hotel and a 21-story office	
Infinity Condominium		Yangon	100.5 m (330 ft)	28	2021		
Sea View Condominium III		Myeik	?	28		Phase 1 (2x22, 2x28) of the overall 12-building complex Phase 2 (8x32) not yet started	
Sea View Condominium IV		Myeik	?	28		Phase 1 (2x22, 2x28) of the overall 12-building complex Phase 2 (8x32) not yet started	
The Central Tower II		Yangon	97 m (318 ft)	27	2021	Kaba Aye Pagoda Road	
The Central Tower III		Yangon	97 m (318 ft)	27	2021	Kaba Aye Pagoda Road	
The Central Tower IV		Yangon	97 m (318 ft)	27	2021	Kaba Aye Pagoda Road	
68 Residence		Yangon	93 m (305 ft)	26	2020	At Saya San and Kaba Aye Pagoda Roads	
Peninsula Residences		Yangon	93 m (305 ft)	26		Burma Railway Headquarters redevelopment	
Landmark Towers III		Yangon	93 m (305 ft)	26	2021	Burma Railway Headquarters redevelopment	
Landmark Towers IV		Yangon	90 m (295 ft)	25	2021	Burma Railway Headquarters redevelopment	

== Timeline of tallest buildings ==
The tallest non-religious building before 1996 was Asia Plaza Hotel, built in Yangon in 1988, which is estimated to be about 57.5 metres (189 ft) or 58.5 metres (192 ft) tall.

The timeline below may be incomplete. Height estimates are denoted in italics.

Name	Image	Location	Height: m (ft)	Floors	Years as tallest	Notes	References
Ananda Temple		Bagan	51 m (167 ft)	2	1105–1150	51 meters without the hti spire; pinnacle height is higher	
Thatbyinnyu Temple		Bagan	66 m (217 ft)	5	1150/51–1996	Tallest temple in Bagan	(Note: See (Archaeology Report 1902: Form A page 2) for the number of stories. See (Ishizawa, Kono 1989: 183), Ishizawa, Yoshiaki; Yasushi Kōno (1989). Study on Pagan. Sophia: Institute for Asian Cultures. p. 239., for the architectural height; and "Bagan". Union of Myanmar Travel Association. for the spire height.)
Sule Shangri-La Hotel		Yangon	80.5 m (264 ft)	22	1996–1999	Formerly, Traders Hotel	
Sakura Tower		Yangon	100 m (328 ft)	20	1999–2016		(Note: According to the tower's web site, "About Sakura Tower". 2020-04-16., it is a 100-meter high 20-story tower, completed in 1999. A 2014 National Geographic article, "The Race to Save Architecture in Myanmar's Biggest City". The National Geographic. 2014-11-13., identifies the Sakura Tower as the tallest building in Yangon.)
Sedona Hotel Inya Wing		Yangon	104 m (341 ft)	29	2016		(Note: Per the hotel's owner Keppel Land, "Sedona Hotel Yangon"., the new 431-room Inya wing was opened in May 2016.)
Golden City Tower I		Yangon	109.7 m (360 ft)	33	2016–2019	Phase 1	
Golden City Tower II		Yangon	109.7 m (360 ft)	33	2016–2019	Phase 1	
Golden City Tower III		Yangon	109.7 m (360 ft)	33	2016–2019	Phase 1	
Golden City Tower IV		Yangon	109.7 m (360 ft)	33	2016–2019	Phase 1	
Golden City Tower V		Yangon	109.7 m (360 ft)	33	2018–2019	Phase 2	(Note: Per (Tin Yadana Tun 2017), Golden City Phase 1 was "completed and handed over" in December 2016.)
Golden City Tower VI		Yangon	109.7 m (360 ft)	33	2018–2019	Phase 2	(Note: Per (Tin Yadana Tun 2017), Golden City Phase 1 was "completed and handed over" in December 2016.)
Golden City Tower VII		Yangon	109.7 m (360 ft)	33	2018–2019	Phase 2	(Note: Per (Tin Yadana Tun 2017), Golden City Phase 1 was "completed and handed over" in December 2016.)
Diamond Inya Palace		Yangon	122 m (400 ft)	34	2019–present		

== See also ==
- List of tallest structures in Myanmar
- List of tallest buildings in Yangon
- Top reviewed places in ASEAN

== External sources ==
- Committee for Quality Control of High Rise Building Construction Projects, Republic of the Union of Myanmar

== Bibliography ==
- Report on Archaeological Work in Burma For the Year 1902–03. Rangoon: The Superintendent, Government Printing, Burma. 1902.
