= Sule Shangri-La Hotel =

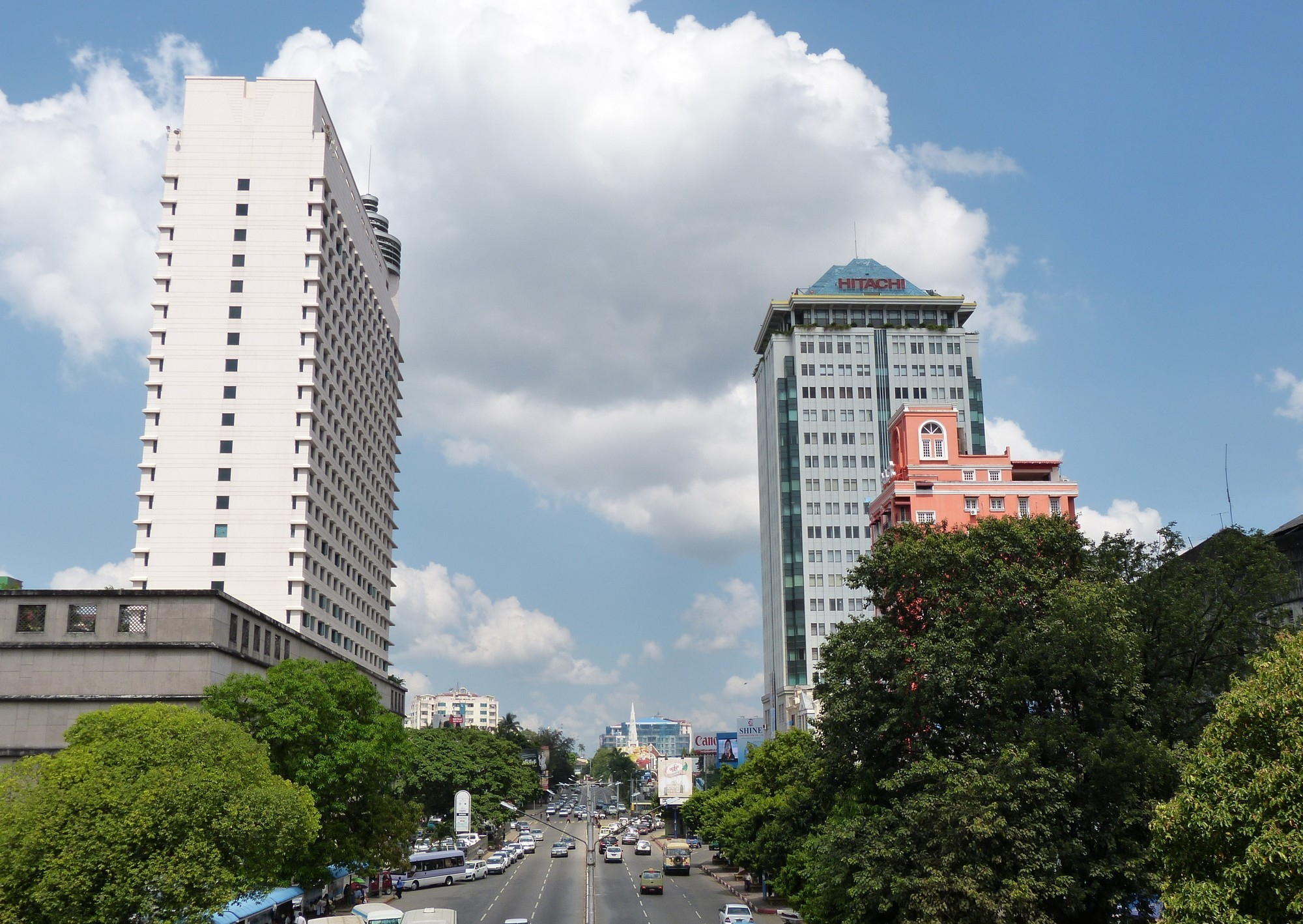
- Sule Shangri-La on the left
- Interactive map of the Sule Shangri-La Hotel area

General information
- Status: Completed
- Type: Hotel
- Location: 223 Sule Pagoda Road; Kyauktada, Yangon
- Coordinates: 16°46′45″N 96°09′23″E
- Completed: 1996
- Opening: 14 November 1996
- Owner: Shangri-La Hotels and Resorts

Height
- Roof: 80.5 m (264 ft)

Technical details
- Floor count: 22

Design and construction
- Architect: Kanko Kikaku Sekkeisha
- Main contractor: Siam Syntech Construction

Sule Shangri-La Hotel (formerly Traders Hotel) is a hotel located in downtown Yangon. It was the tallest building in Myanmar from 1996 to 1999. The 466-room hotel opened in 1996 as Traders Hotel. Its owner, Shangri-La Hotels and Resorts, rebranded the hotel to its current name in 2014.

Records
| Preceded by Thatbyinnyu Temple | Tallest Building in Myanmar; 1996–1999 | Succeeded by Sakura Tower |
