= YHT (disambiguation) =

Yüksek Hızlı Tren is the high-speed rail service of the Turkish State Railways.

YHT may also refer to: Youth Health Team

- Haines Junction Airport, a Canadian airport
- Yangon Heritage Trust
- A US Navy hull classification symbol: Heating scow (YHT)
