= Yangon Heritage Trust =

- ရန်ကုန်အမွေအနှစ် ထိန်းသိမ်းစောင့်ရှောက်ရေးအဖွဲ့
- Abbreviation: YHT
- Formation: 2012
- Type: NGO
- Headquarters: Yangon, Myanmar
- Location: Kyauktada Township
- Chairman: Thant Myint-U
- Website: yangonheritagetrust.org

The Yangon Heritage Trust (Burmese: ရန်ကုန်အမွေအနှစ် ထိန်းသိမ်းစောင့်ရှောက်ရေးအဖွဲ့; abbreviated YHT) is a non-governmental organisation founded by Thant Myint-U to conserve historic buildings in Yangon (formerly Rangoon), the former capital of Burma. Yangon has Asia's largest collection of colonial-era buildings. The Trust has proposed to designate small zones within the city centre (particularly in Downtown Yangon) as heritage areas and envisions a joint public-private collaboration whereby private investors restore heritage buildings for commercial use while maintaining the character of the areas. The Trust also advocates a conservation plan led by the private sector.

In June 2013, Philips announced a partnership with the Trust to install 200 LED-lit blue plaques to highlight key cultural heritage sites in the city.

There are around 15,000 buildings in Yangon that the Trust wants preserved, and as of 2020 it has helped with 350 conservation projects.

== See also ==
- Yangon
- Yangon City Heritage List
