= Thatbyinnyu Temple =

Theravadin Buddhist temple and UNESCO world heritage site monument in Bagan, Myanmar

- သဗ္ဗညု ဘုရား
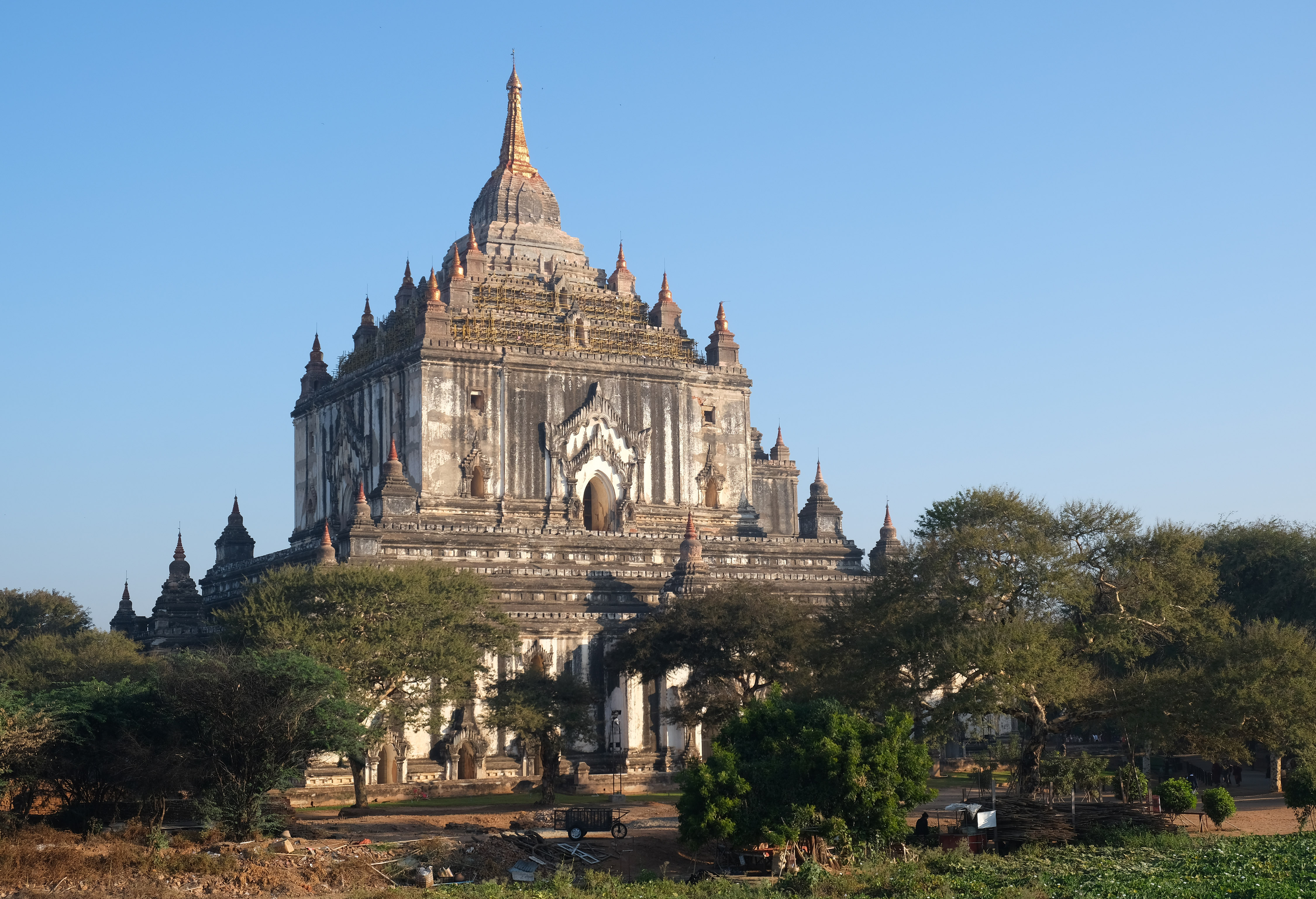

- Location within Myanmar

Religion
- Affiliation: Buddhism
- Sect: Theravada

Location
- Location: Bagan
- Country: Myanmar
- Coordinates: 21.16875°N 94.86295°E

Architecture
- Founder: King Sithu I
- Groundbreaking: 1144/45; 506 ME
- Completed: 1150/51; 512 ME

Specifications
- Height (max): 61.3 m (201 ft)
- Spire height: 66 m (217 ft)

The Thatbyinnyu Temple (Burmese: သဗ္ဗညု ဘုရား, [θaʔ bjɪ̀ɰ̃ ɲ̥ṵ pʰəjá]; Pali: Sabbaññū or "the Omniscient") is a Theravadin Buddhist temple in Bagan (Pagan), Myanmar. The temple is recognized as a monument in the Bagan Archeological Area, a UNESCO World Heritage Site. Completed in 1150–51 during the reign of King Sithu I, the temple reflected the Bagan period's "innovative architectural and artistic creativity" and "an expression of the self-confident Burmese spirit of nationhood." (Note: See (Fiala 2002) quoting (Strachan 1990).) At the pinnacle height of 66 m (217 ft), the five-story Thatbyinnyu is known as the tallest temple in Bagan, alongside the tallest stupa in Bagan, the 100 m (328 ft) Shwesandaw.

The temple was badly damaged by the earthquakes of 1975 and 2016. It is undergoing restoration work with Chinese technical and financial assistance; the restoration work is expected to last until about 2028.

== Foundation ==
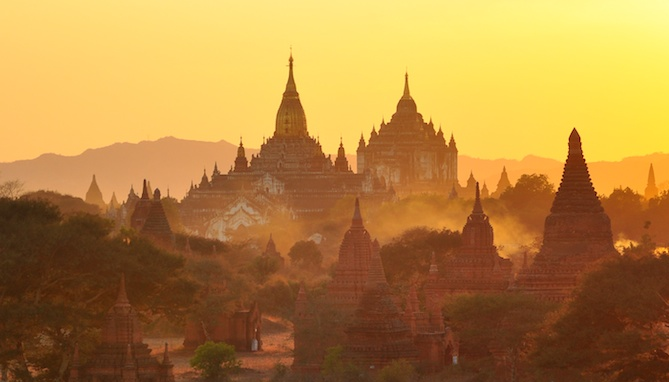
The Ananda Temple in the foreground and the Thatbyinnyu in the background

Just inside the southeastern corner of the old city wall, the Thatbyinnyu Temple was founded by King Sithu I of Pagan Dynasty in 1144/45. According to the royal chronicles, it was the king's second major temple construction after the Shwegugyi Temple, and the king is said to have donated "boatloads of rubies" to both temples.

The temple was constructed during "a period of rededication to Theravada Buddhism and religious scholarship", and construction was completed in the year 1150/51. (Additional ornamentation work continued on the terraces but was never fully completed. The terraces contain indentations that were meant to hold a series of over 500 ceramic plaques depicting the jataka stories but the plaques apparently were never added.)

== Architecture ==
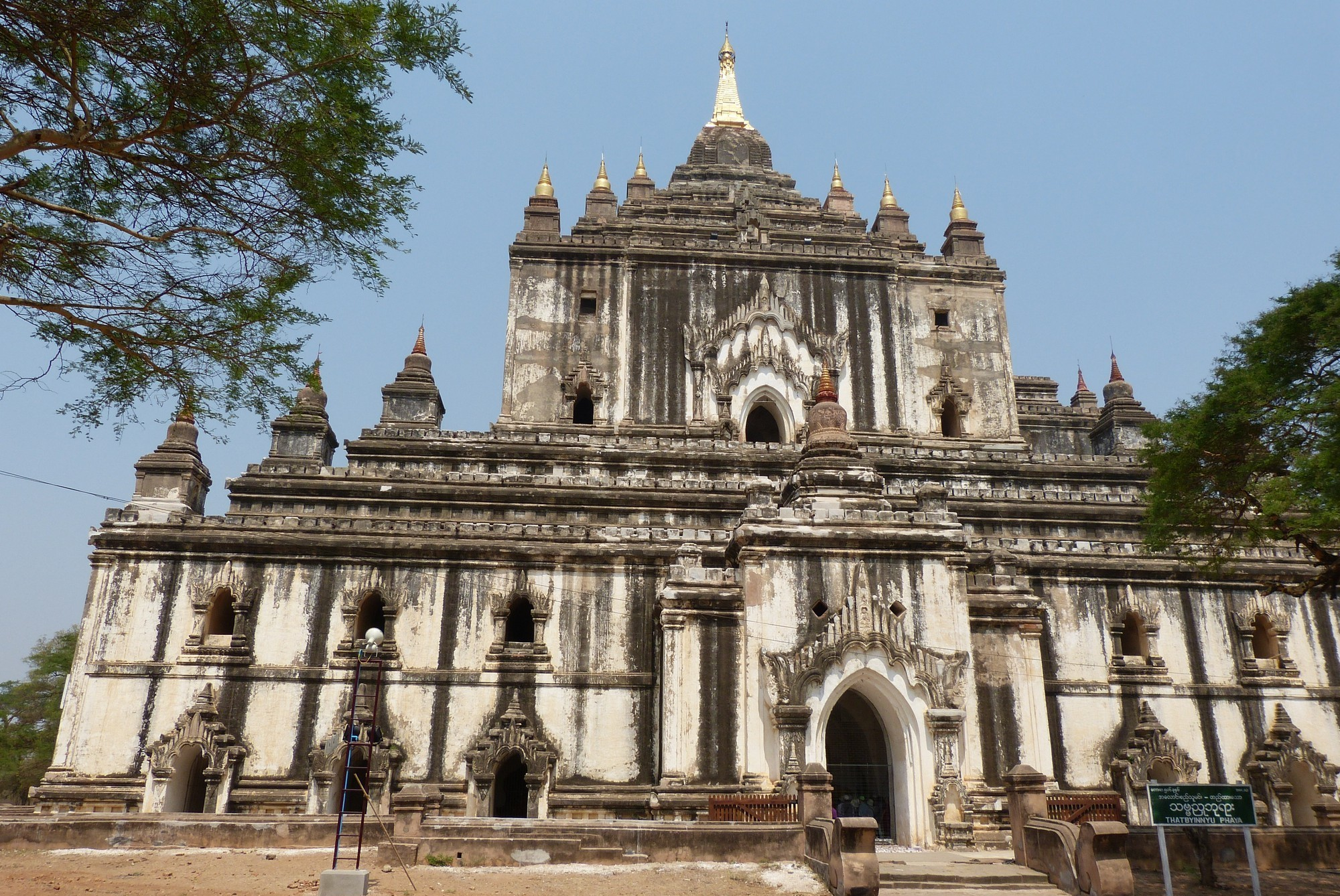
A closer view of Thatbyinnyu Phaya

The Thatbyinnyu is a five-story brick masonry building topped by a sikhara tower with a hti at the pinnacle. "Somewhat similar to" the nearby Ananda Temple in its architectural style, the temple's exterior is covered in white stucco, and its terraces paved in stone. The temple was originally at the center of a walled enclosure, of which only the north gate remains. It sits on a platform that is approximately 58 m (190 ft) on each side. The east side has a projected 7.3 m × 11.6 m (24 ft × 38 ft) entry hall, while each of the north, south, and west sides has a 3.3 m-long (11 ft) protrusion and six entry points.

The temple exterior resembles a series of square "cubes", stacked on top of each other, separated by seven receding terraces. Each corner of the terraces is adorned with stupa obelisks on square bases. The elevated central tower, or sikhara, is 30.03 m (98.5 ft) on each side. The temple's architectural height (nyandaw) is 61.3 metres (201 ft) tall; its pinnacle height is 66 metres (217 ft). It is the tallest temple in Bagan. It is not the tallest structure in Bagan, however; the tallest is the Shwesandaw Pagoda, which is at least 100 m (328 ft) tall, without counting the hti spire.

The five-story temple served not only as a place of worship but also as a monastery and library. The temple's first and second floors were used as the residence for monks; the third floor was used to hold images; the fourth was used as a library; and the fifth stored relics. The interior of the temple consists of "pointed arches in the spacious hallways and barrel vaults in other areas". Each floor has two tiers of windows, creating a "vibrant and light interior". Murals filled the ceiling. Original murals with the footprints of the Buddha have survived on the ceiling of the western porch.

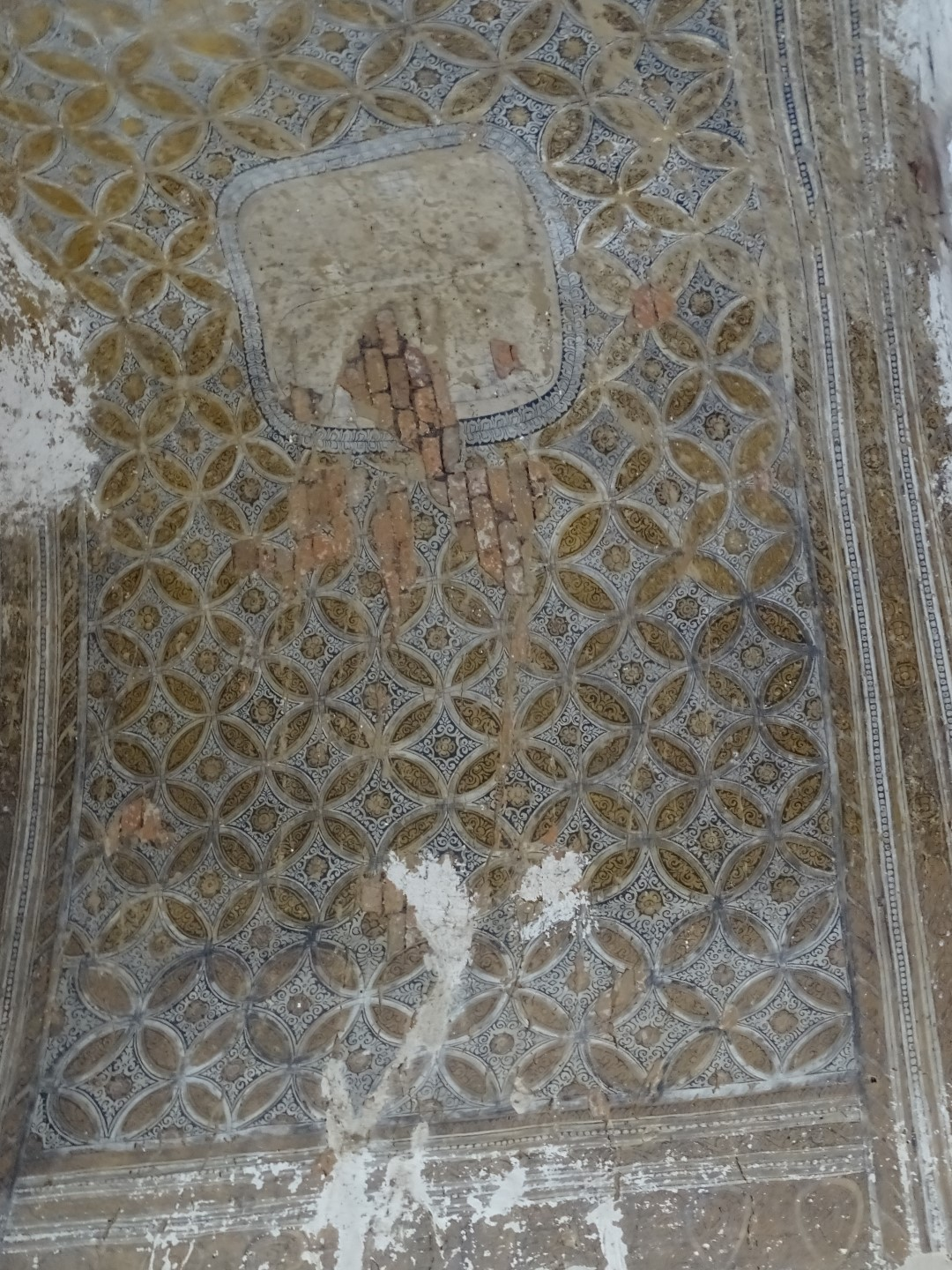
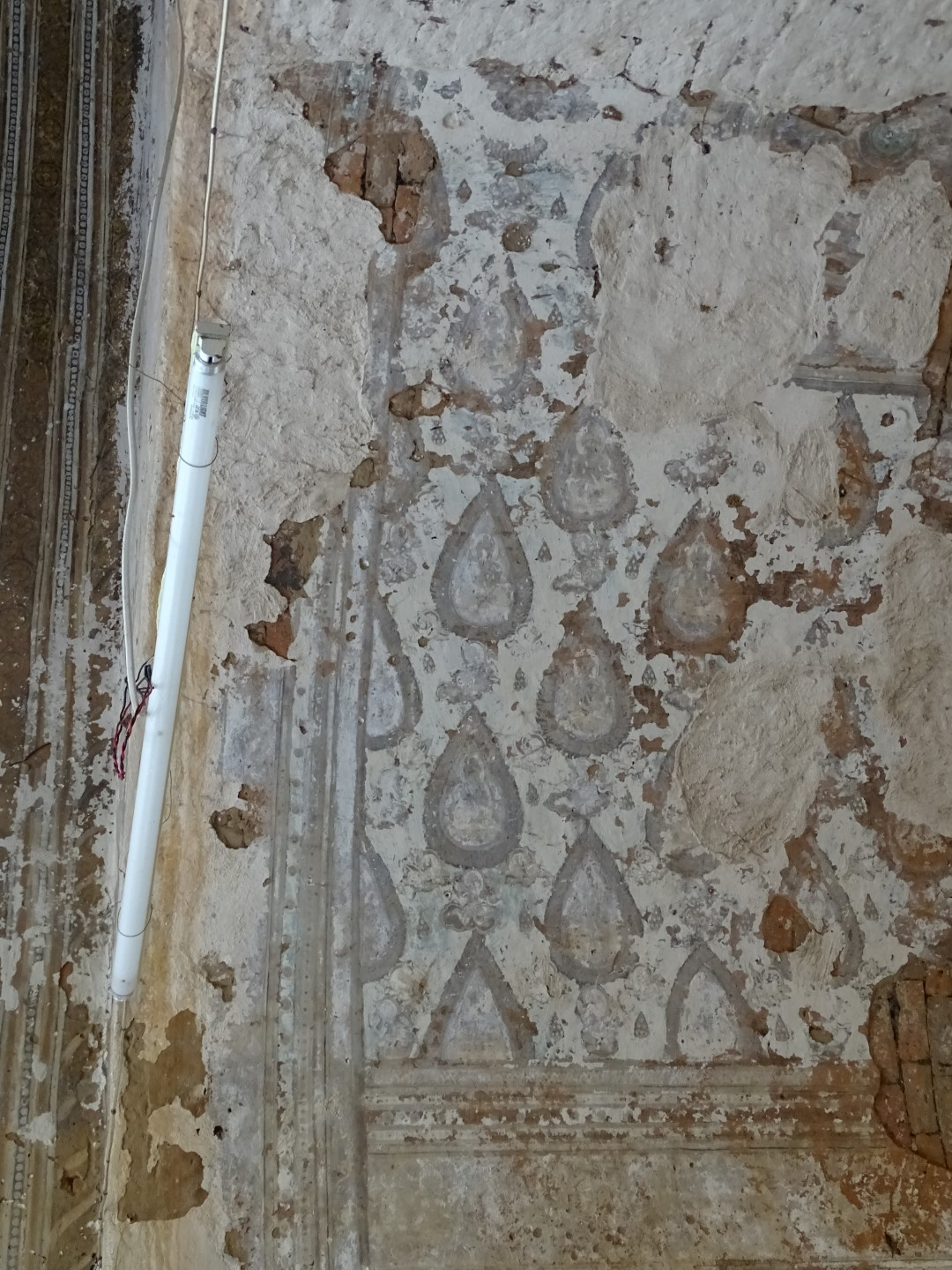
Frescos within Thatbyinnyu Temple

The temple "reflected the era's innovative architectural and artistic creativity" of the era. Bagan period scholar Paul Strachan calls Thatbyinnyu "an expression of the self-confident Burmese spirit of nationhood."

== Recent history ==
The temple is known to have been hit by at least two major earthquakes, occurring in the years 1975 and 2016. The 1975 earthquake left the temple with heavy damage. The top finial of the sikhara, the main Buddha statue on the 3rd floor, and the corner stupas were all damaged. Vertical cracks measuring up to 23 cm (9.1 in) in width appeared on the exterior walls of the third floor. The damages were repaired by 1979, and the structure was further strengthened in the early 1990s. More maintenance work such as waterproofing of terraces and repointing the exterior were undertaken in the 2000s.

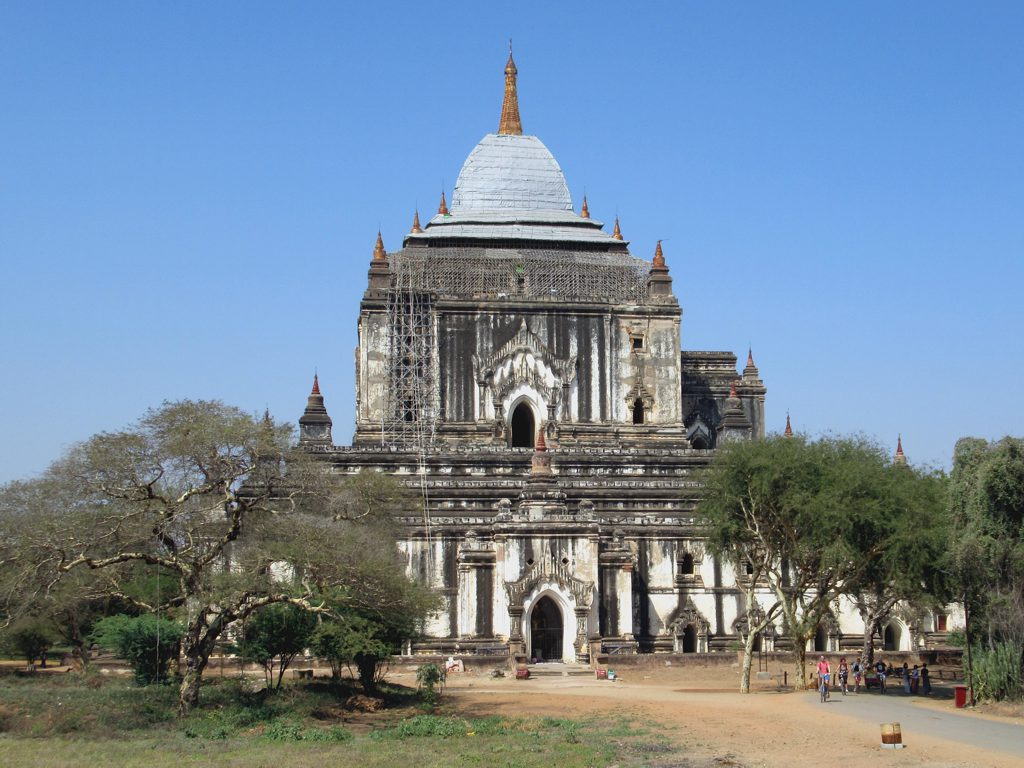
The Thatbyinnyu Temple under construction in 2018, due to damage resulting from the 2016 earthquake

The temple was badly damaged after a 6.8 magnitude earthquake hit the Bagan region August 24, 2016. It was one of the 36 worst-hit structures, and sustained several horizontal and vertical cracks throughout the structure across all floors and terraces. Masonry works at the bottom were further damaged by rain. The temple's structure was reinforced with Chinese assistance in 2017. In April 2019, a Chinese archaeological team began working on a nine-year project to restore the temple.

On July 6, 2019, the Bagan Archaeological Area became a UNESCO World Heritage Site. The Thatbyinnyu Temple's UNESCO designation is Monument #1597.

== Gallery ==
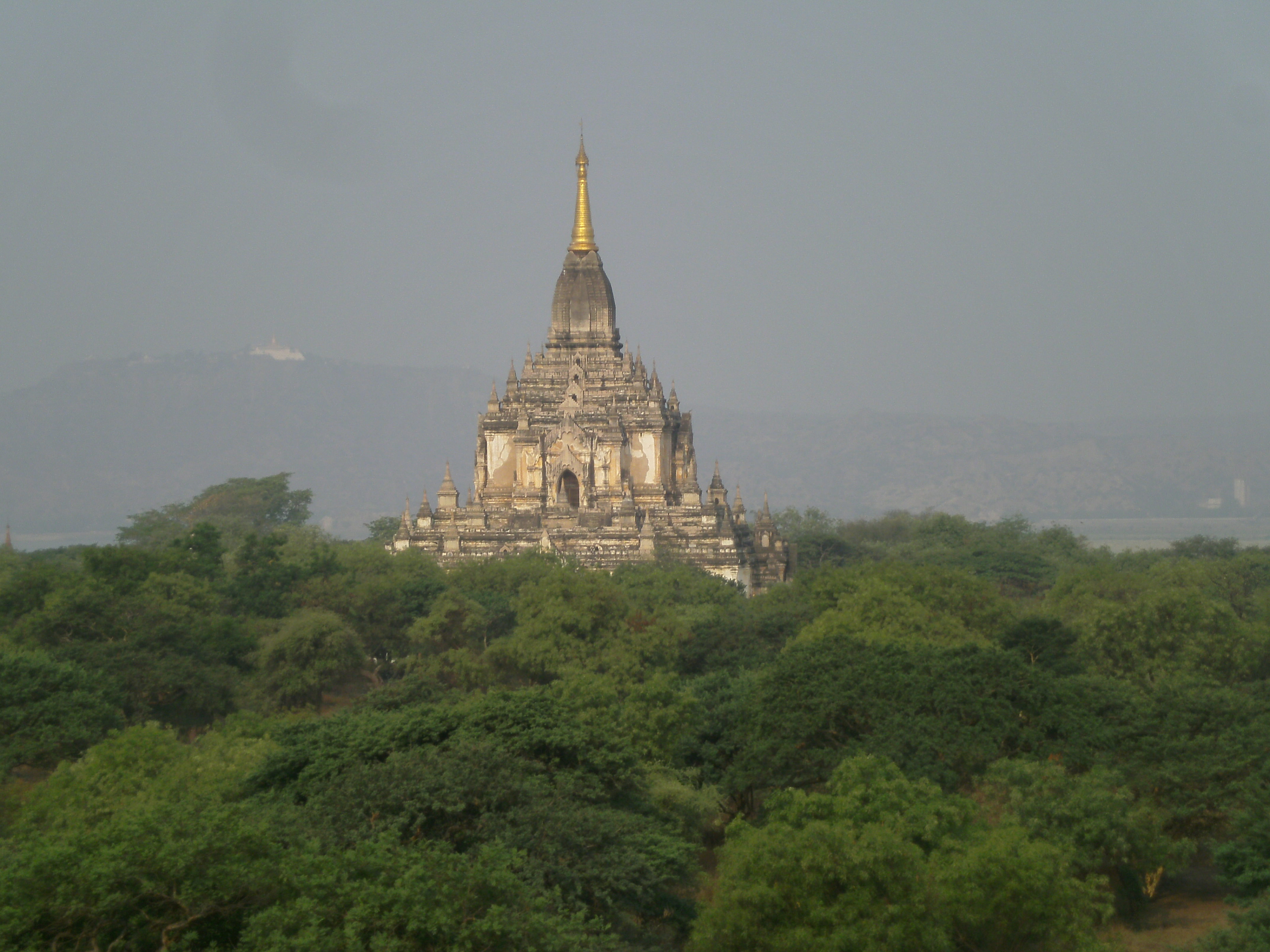
As seen from the Shwegugyi Temple

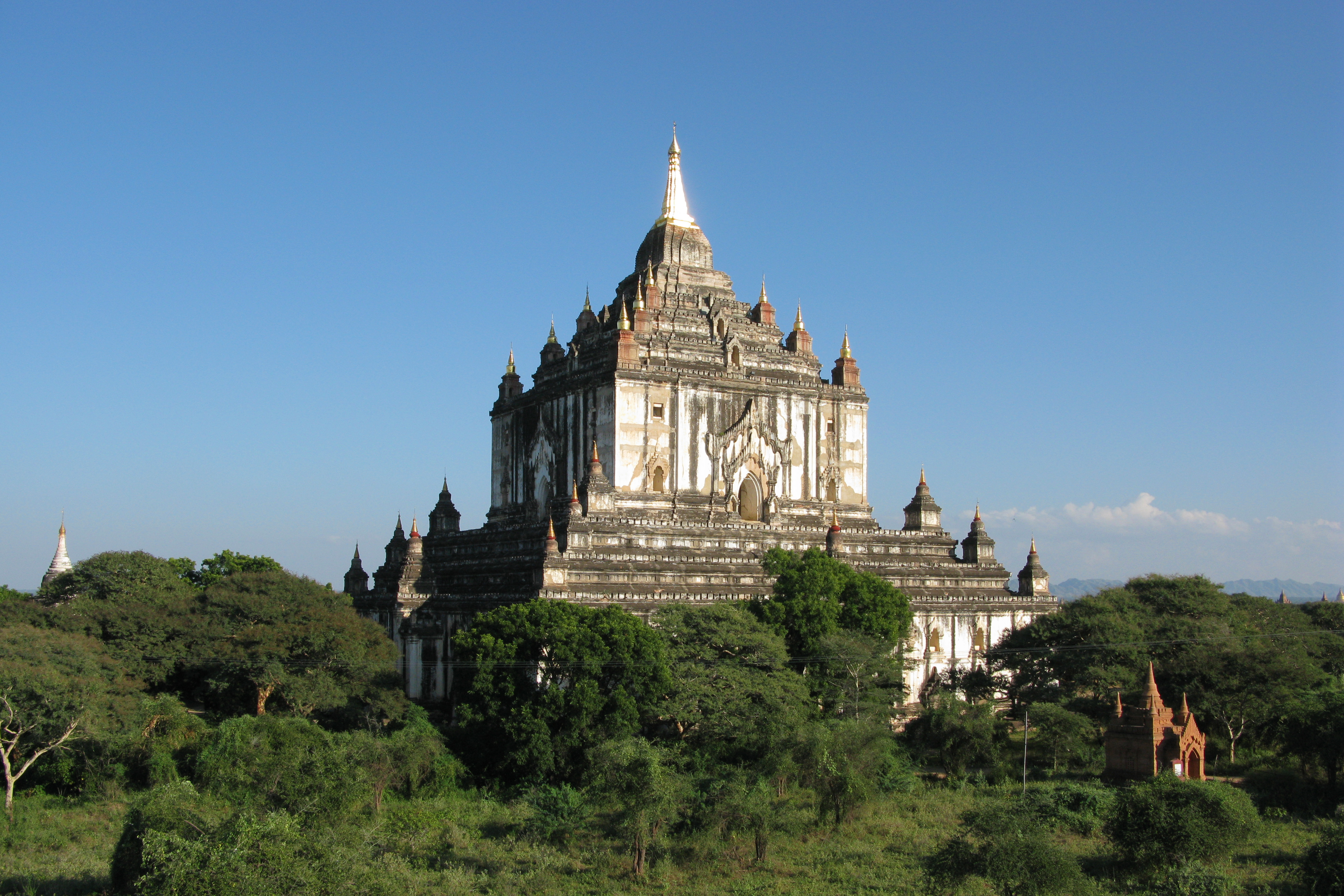

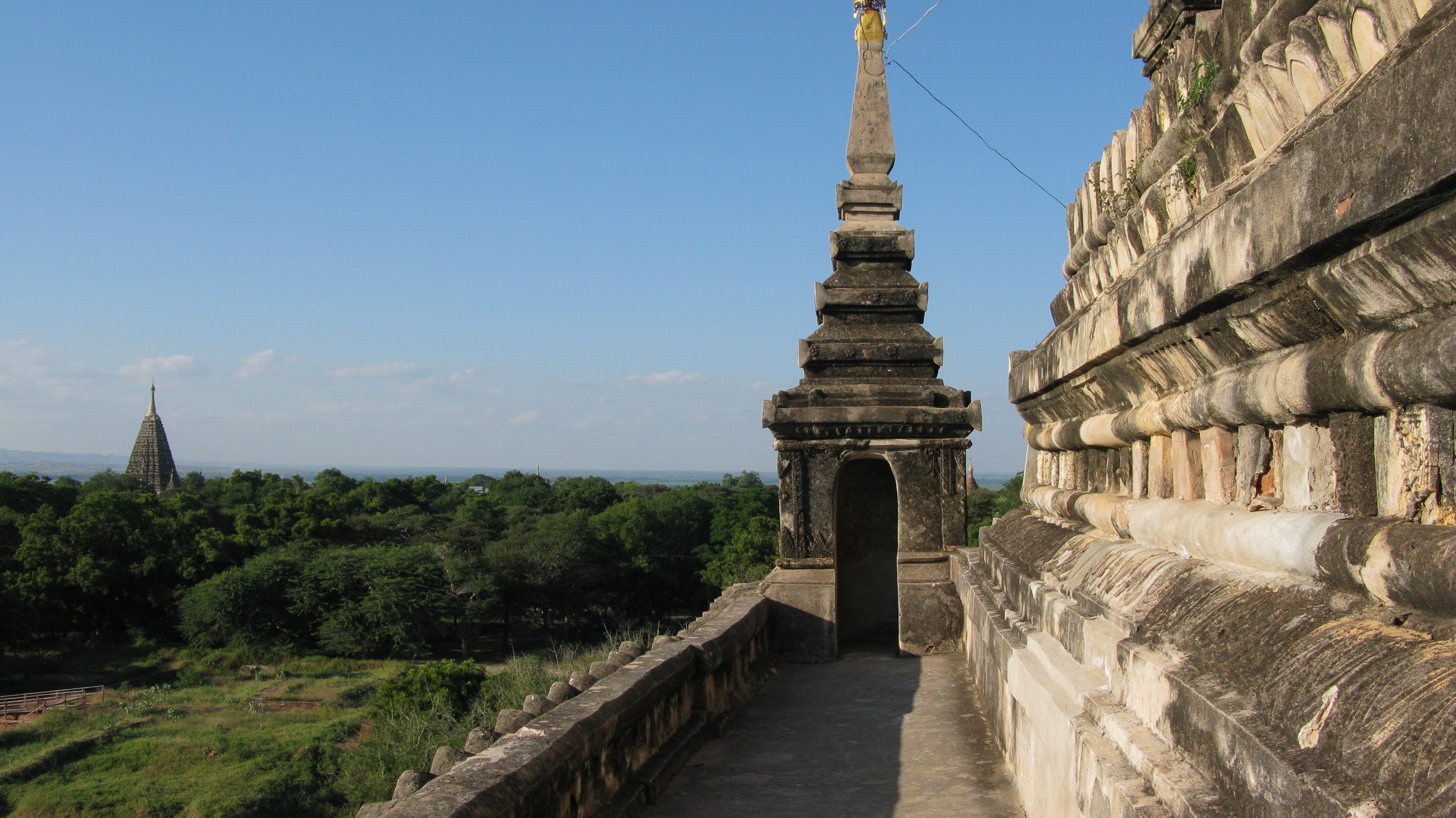

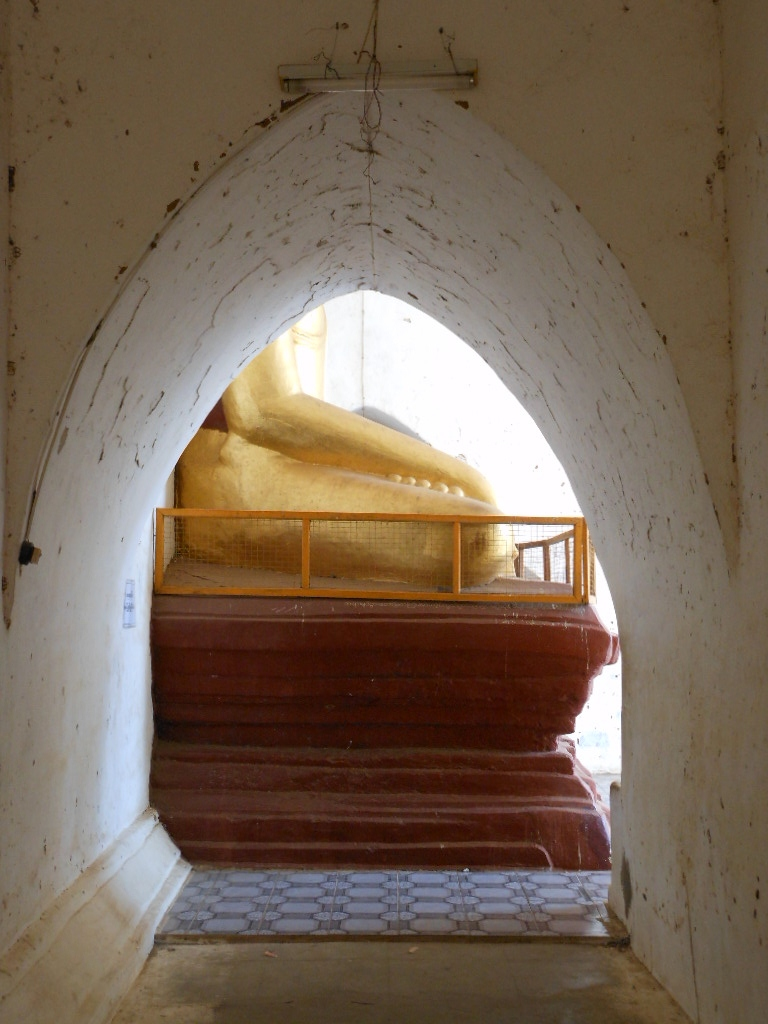

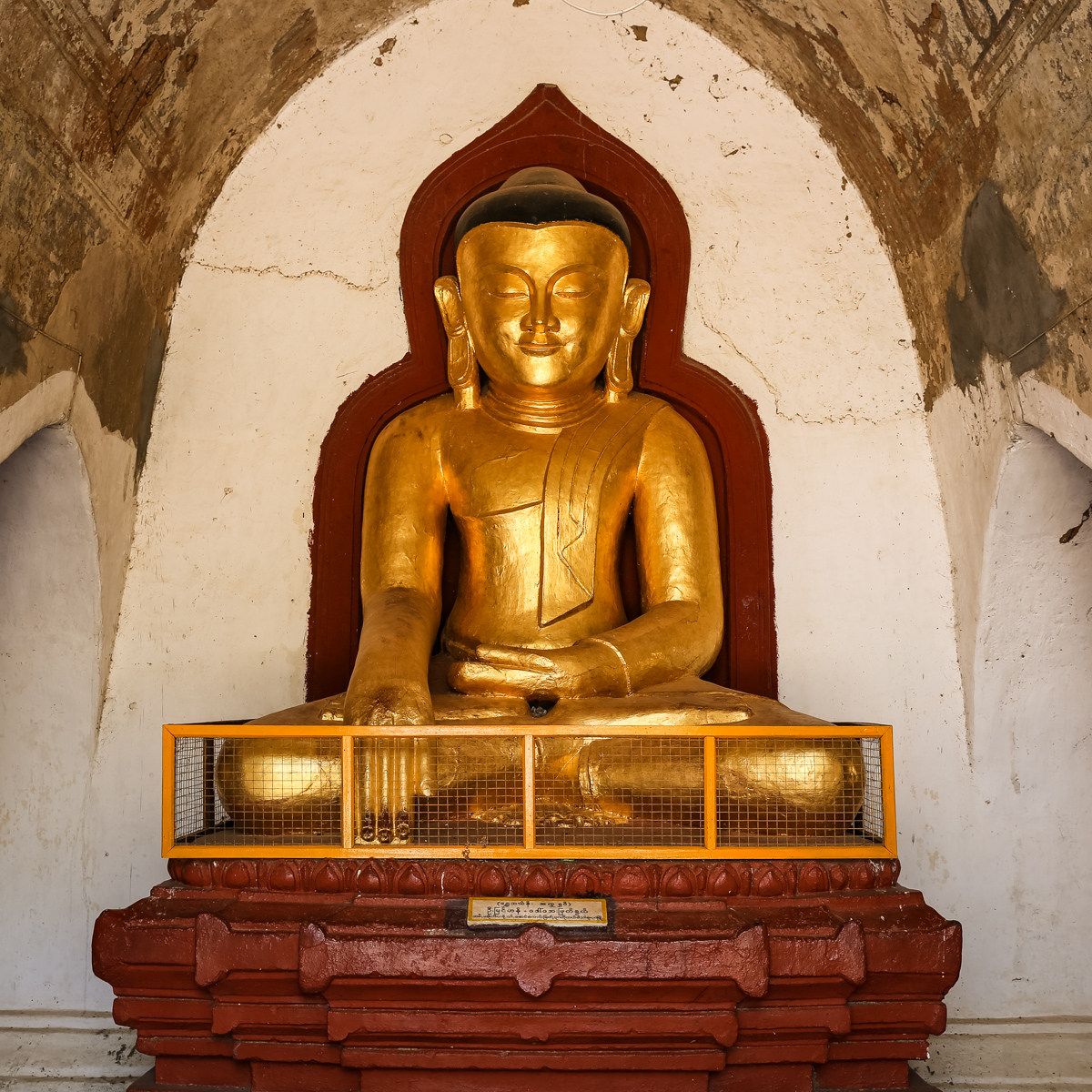

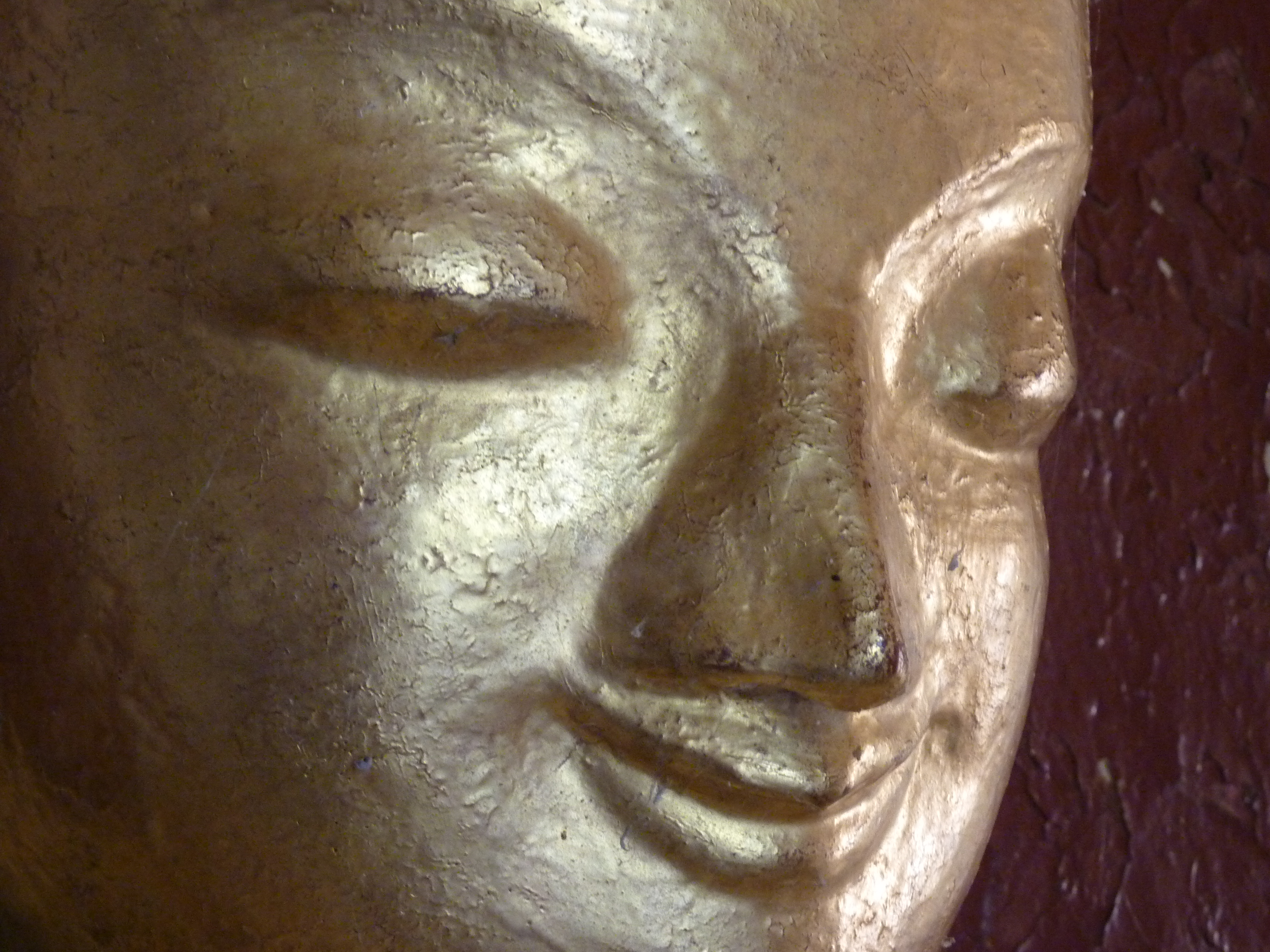

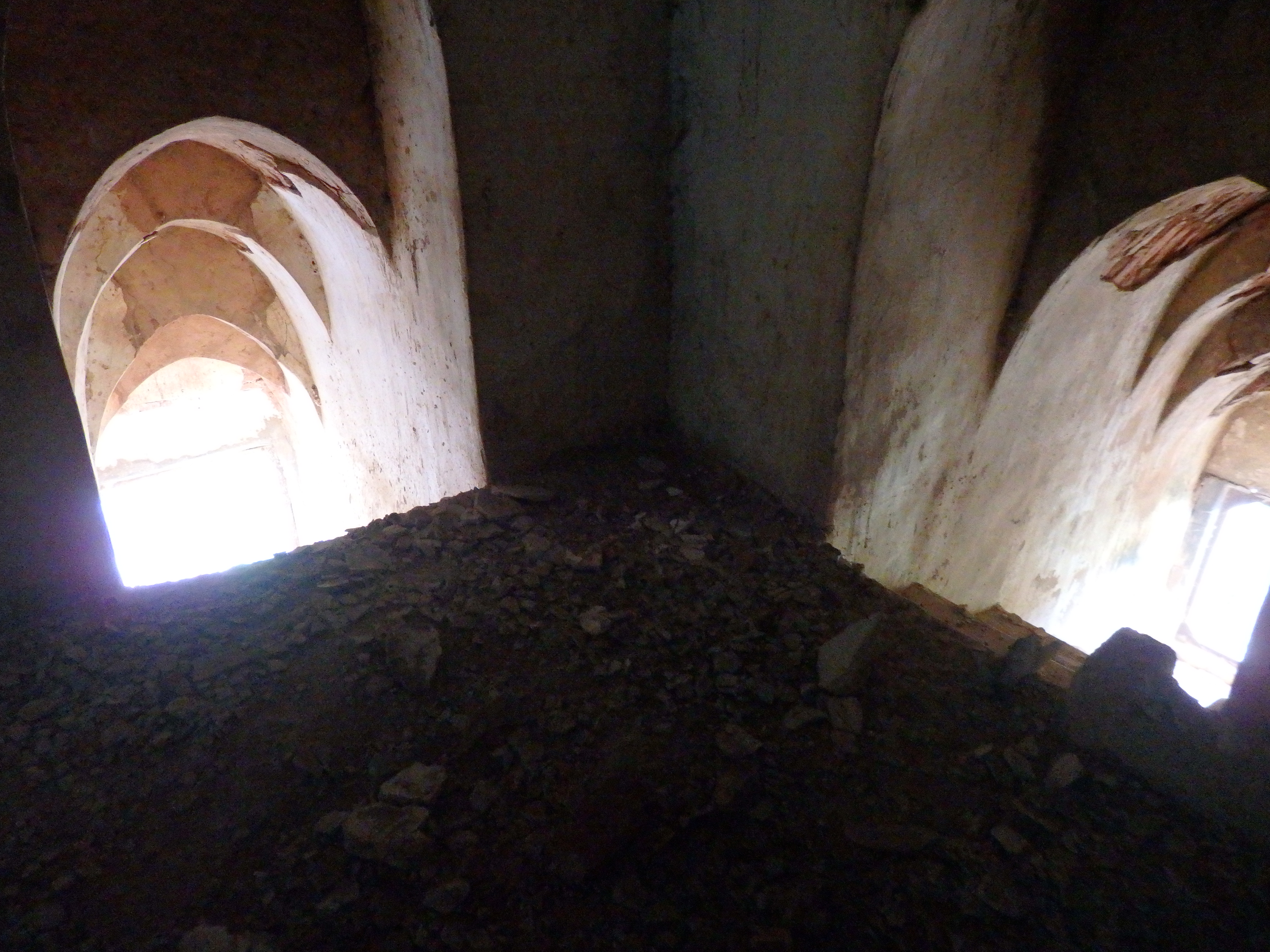

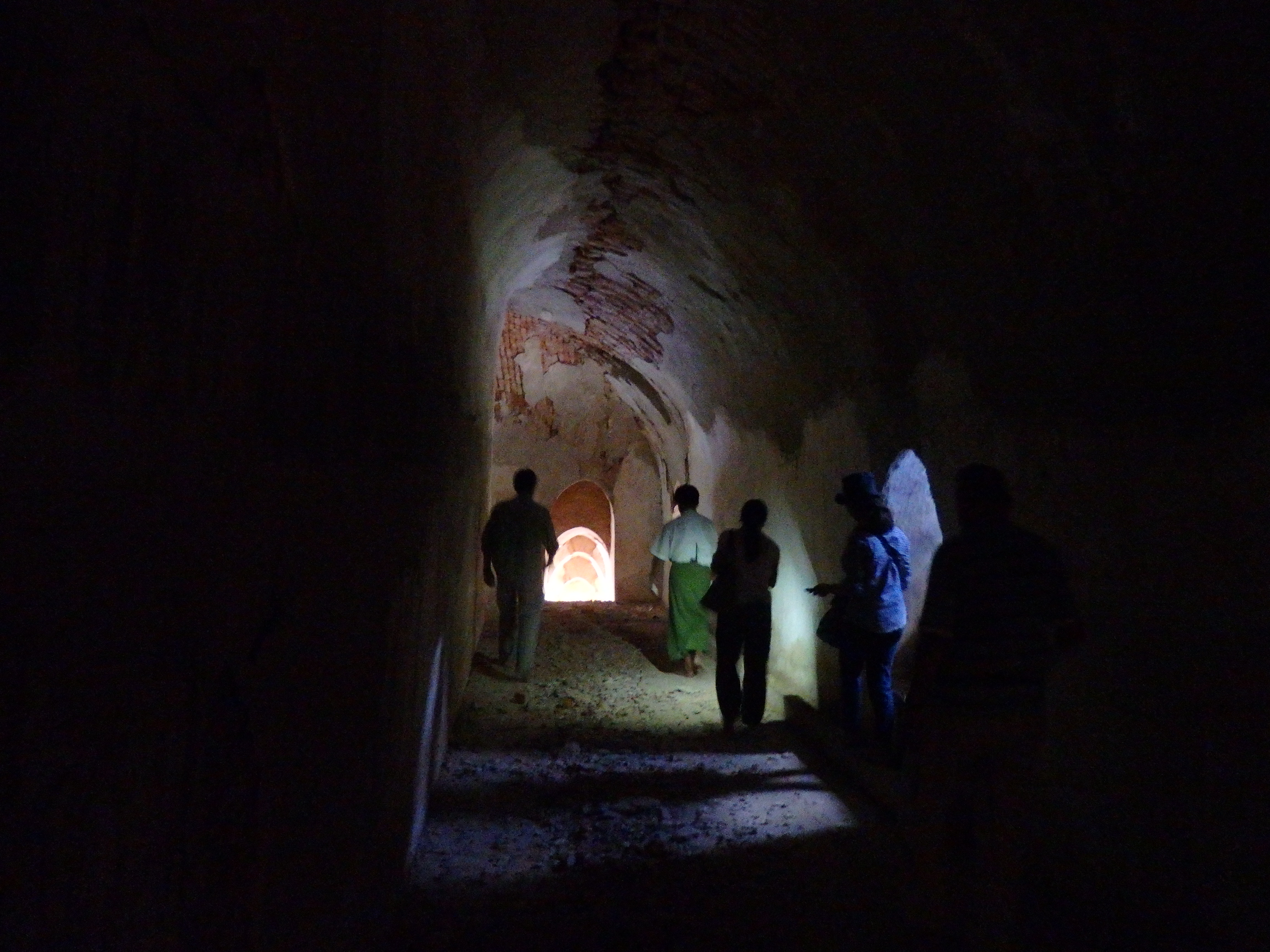

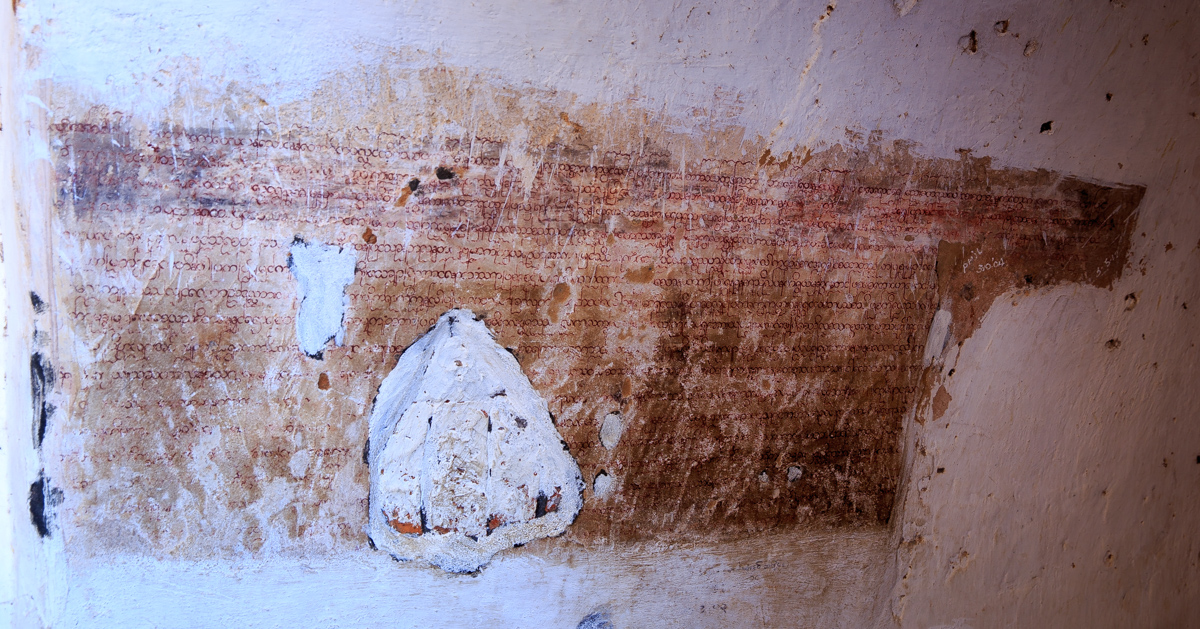

== See also ==
- List of tallest structures built before the 20th century

== Bibliography ==
- Coedès, George (1968), Walter F. Vella (ed.), The Indianized States of Southeast Asia, trans.Susan Brown Cowing, University of Hawaii Press, ISBN 978-0-8248-0368-1
- Fiala, Robert D. (2002), Thatbyinnyu Phaya Temple, Bagan, Myanmar, Oriental Architecture
- Ishizawa, Yoshiaki; Yasushi Kōno (1989), Study on Pagan, Sophia: Institute for Asian Cultures, p. 239
- Kala, U (2006) [1724], Maha Yazawin (in Burmese), vol. 1–3 (4th printing ed.), Yangon: Ya-Pyei Publishing
- Myo Nyunt Aung (16–17 December 2017), Archaeological Conservation of Bagan Ancient Monuments in Myanmar, Bangkok: Waseda University and Silpakorn University
- Royal Historians of Burma (1960) [c. 1680], U Hla Tin (Hla Thamein) (ed.), Zatadawbon Yazawin, Historical Research Directorate of the Union of Burma
- Royal Historical Commission of Burma (1832). Hmannan Yazawin (in Burmese). Vol. 1–3 (2003 ed.). Yangon: Ministry of Information, Myanmar.
- Report on Archaeological Work in Burma For the Year 1902–03, Rangoon: The Superintendent, Government Printing, Burma, 1902
- Pictorial Guide to Pagan, Rangoon: Ministry of Culture, 1975 [1955]
- Bagan: UNESCO World Heritage Site, UNESCO

Records
Preceded by Ananda Temple	Tallest Building in Myanmar; 1150/51–1996	Succeeded by Sule Shangri-La Hotel
