= Yuzana Plaza =

Building in Yangon, Myanmar

Coordinates: 16°47′38.9″N 96°10′33.0″E

Yuzana Plaza is a five-storey building located on Banyardala Road, Mingala Taungnyunt Township, Yangon, Myanmar (Burma).

== Location ==
Yuzana Plaza is located on Banyardala Road, which is start from Theinbyu Tennis Court to Tamwe Circle. Yuzana Plaza is also near with Mingalar Shopping Mall (only 200 meters) and Kandawgyi Lake. It is located on the border of Mingala Taungnyunt Township and Tamwe Township. There is a bus stop called Yuzana Plaza Bus Stop opposite to it.

== History ==
Yuzana Plaza was completed in 1994 and shops in the plaza opened at the beginning of 1995. The owner of the plaza is Htay Myint, one of the richest people in Burma.

== See also ==
Myanmar Plaza
