= Golden City, Yangon =

Golden City
- Interactive map of the Golden City area

General information
- Status: Completed (Phases 1 & 2); Proposed (Phase 3)
- Type: Condominium
- Location: Golden City Place, Yankin Road; Yankin, Yangon
- Coordinates: 16°49′37″N 96°09′49″E
- Construction started: March 2014
- Completed: 2016 (Phase 1); 2018 (Phase 2)
- Opening: December 2016
- Cost: US$290 million US$200 million (Phase 3)
- Owner: ETC Singapore

Height
- Roof: 109.7 m (360 ft) (Residential towers)

Technical details
- Floor count: 33 (Residential towers 1–9); 5 (Business Centre)

Design and construction
- Developer: Golden Land Real Estate Development Co. Ltd.

Golden City is a mixed-use complex located in the Yankin section of Yangon, Myanmar. Its master plan includes nine 33-story residential towers, a hotel, a business center and a shopping mall. As of 2020, the first two phases of the master plan—seven residential towers and a business center, have been completed. Work on phase 3, which includes a hotel, shopping mall and cinemas, and a residential tower, had not begun as of March 2020.

The complex's first four towers were the tallest buildings in Myanmar from 2016 to 2019. The complex's second batch of towers (Towers 5–7), the same height as the first four, then also became the joint tallest buildings in the country from 2018 to 2019. (Note: Emporis estimates the height of the towers to be 118.5 m (389 ft) but Dot Property Myanmar says the towers are only 109.7 m (360 ft) tall. Furthermore, a total of seven 33-story towers have been completed per (The Myanmar Times, 5 March 2020).)

== Notes ==
Records
Preceded by Sedona Hotel, Yangon	Tallest Building in Myanmar; 2016–2019	Succeeded by Diamond Inya Palace
