= Sedona Hotel, Yangon =

Sedona Hotel
- Interactive map of the Sedona Hotel area

General information
- Status: Completed
- Type: Hotel
- Location: 1 Kaba Aye Pagoda Road, Yankin 11081; Yangon, Myanmar
- Coordinates: 16°49′46″N 96°09′18″E
- Completed: 1996 (Garden Wing); 2016 (Inya Wing)
- Opening: October 1996 (Garden Wing); May 2016 (Inya Wing)
- Owner: Keppel Land

Height
- Roof: 104 m (341 ft) (estimate)

Technical details
- Floor count: 29 (Inya Wing)

Website
- Sedona Yangon

Sedona Hotel is a high end hotel in Yangon, Myanmar. The hotel consists of two buildings named Garden Wing and Inya Wing. The Garden Wing is older and built in a more traditional colonial style. The 29-story Inya Wing tower was briefly the tallest building in Myanmar, from May to December 2016. (Note: Per Tin Yadana Tun (19 October 2017). "Golden City opens grade-A office tower in Yankin". The Myanmar Times., the first four 33-story residential towers of Golden City, Yangon opened in December 2016.)

== Notes ==
Records
Preceded by Sakura Tower	Tallest Building in Myanmar; May–December 2016	Succeeded by Golden City
