= Diamond Inya Palace =

Residential skyscraper in Yangon, Myanmar

- Interactive map of the Diamond Inya Palace area

General information
- Status: Completed
- Type: Condominium
- Location: 2 U Tun Nyein Street; Mayangon, Yangon
- Coordinates: 16°51′02″N 96°08′48″E
- Construction started: 2012
- Completed: 2019
- Opening: 29 November 2019
- Cost: $60 million (orig. est.)

Height
- Roof: 122 m (400 ft) (est.)

Technical details
- Floor count: 34
- Floor area: 120,000 m²

Design and construction
- Architect: JGP Architecture
- Developer: MGW
- Main contractor: MGW Construction

Website
- www.diamondinyapalace.com

Diamond Inya Palace is a residential skyscraper located on the northern side of the Inya Lake in Yangon, Myanmar. Although its exact height is not publicly known, the 34-story condominium is widely considered to be the tallest building in Myanmar. The 376-unit condominium was completed and opened in 2019.

Estimated to be about 122 m (400 ft) tall, the building is located in what is now the low-rise zone centered around the Shwedagon Pagoda. During construction in 2016, with 26 stories completed, the building came under review by the Yangon Region Government for exceeding the height limit in the then draft zoning plan. The building apparently was grandfathered in, and allowed to proceed. In any case, the developer of the building, MGW, has not publicly revealed the exact height of the building to date.

Records
Preceded by Golden City, Yangon	Tallest Building in Myanmar; 2019–present	Incumbent
