= Sakura Tower =

- Interactive map of the Sakura Tower area

General information
- Location: 339 Bogyoke Aung San Road, Kyauktada, Yangon, Myanmar
- Coordinates: 16.779363°N 96.159382°E
- Opened: 1999

Height
- Height: 100 m (328 ft)

Technical details
- Floor count: 20

Design and construction
- Architects: Nihon Sekkei Inc; Konoike Construction Co Ltd.

Website
- Sakura Tower Website

Sakura Tower is a 20-story modern office building in Kyauktada Township, Yangon, Myanmar. The 100 m (328 ft) tower was completed by Japanese contractors in 1999 and was the tallest building in Myanmar from 1999 to 2016. (Note: According to the tower's web site, , it is a 100 m (330 ft) high 20-story tower, completed in 1999. A 2014 National Geographic article, "The Race to Save Architecture in Myanmar's Biggest City". The National Geographic. 2014-11-13. Archived from the original on February 18, 2020., identifies the Sakura Tower as the tallest building in Yangon.)

It stands opposite Sule Shangri-La Hotel across the Sule Pagoda Road.

Yangon Japanese Association maintains its offices on the 12th floor.

== Notes ==
Records
Preceded by Sule Shangri-La Hotel	Tallest Building in Myanmar; 1999–2016	Succeeded by Sedona Hotel, Yangon
