= Amhoist Tower =

- U.S. National Register of Historic Places
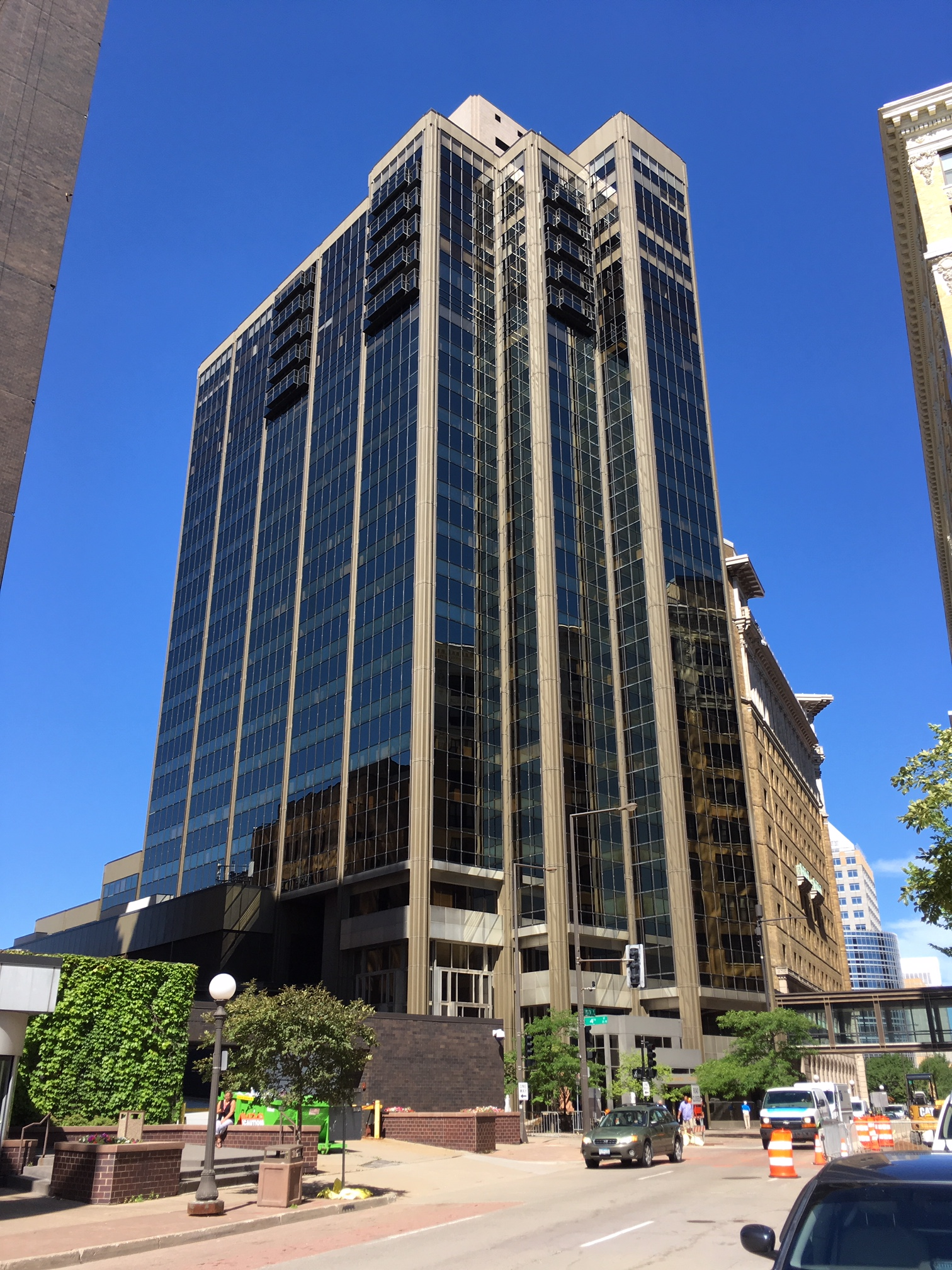

- Location within Minnesota Location within the United States
- Location: 345 Saint Peter Street, St. Paul, Minnesota
- Coordinates: 44.94447°N 93.09577°W
- Built: 1983
- Architect: Bennett, Ringrose, Wolsfeld, Jarvis, Gardner, Inc. (BRW)
- Architectural style: Modern
- NRHP reference No.: 100007789
- Added to NRHP: June 3, 2022

The Amhoist Tower is an office tower on the west side of downtown St. Paul, Minnesota, overlooking Rice Park. The tower was built in 1983-1984 and is adjacent to the St. Paul Hotel. The building was originally built for residential condominiums on the nineteenth through twenty-third floors, with office space on the levels below that. The office tower, now known as Landmark Towers, has the address of 345 Saint Peter Street. The condominiums are now known as Park Towers and have the address of 59 Fourth Street West. The tower was listed on the National Register of Historic Places in 2022 for its association with the American Hoist and Derrick Company.

== History ==
American Hoist and Derrick Company, founded in 1882, was a major manufacturer in St. Paul for over a century. The company's cranes were used in construction projects such as Mount Rushmore and the Panama Canal, as well as transferring the Space Shuttle to and from aircraft carriers. They built ships during World War I and World War II. They prided themselves on building the world's biggest and best cranes, hoists, and related equipment. The company diversified in the mid-twentieth century, having purchased hardware wholesaler Farwell, Ozmun and Kirk and fire equipment manufacturer Waterous. The company's headquarters was originally located within its manufacturing complex on the west bank of the Mississippi River, just south of downtown St. Paul. While it had convenient access to road and railroad connections, it was located within a flood plain. In addition, the manufacturing complex had the grime, sounds, and smells associated with heavy industry. While the flood problem was addressed with a relocated flood wall, the company did not want to continue with its headquarters in an industrial area.

Meanwhile, during the late 1970s, real estate development was booming around Rice Park, spurred by the renovation of Landmark Center. The Yorktown Investment Company found an underutilized site south of the St. Paul Hotel and planned to build an office tower. With the help of the St. Paul Port Authority, Yorktown attracted Amhoist as its anchor tenant, planning to house about 200 administrative employees on seven floors. The tower was initially planned for eighteen stories, then later speculated as twenty-eight stories, before finally being fixed at eighteen stories of office space and seven stories of residential condominiums. Amhoist was doing well financially when they decided to move their headquarters, but during the early 1980s, economic conditions turned unfavorable, especially in the oil and gas exploration industry and in scrap metal recycling. The company responded with layoffs and plant closures, with employment dropping from 7100 in 1981 to 3700 two years later. Amhoist became a target for vulture capitalists and experienced continued losses in the 1980s, eventually selling its crane business in 1986. In 1988, Amhoist announced a takeover bid for CoastAmerica, previously known as Coast to Coast Hardware, and sold the Waterous division. The deal went through, and Amhoist moved its headquarters to Denver and renamed itself the Amdura Corporation. The Amhoist Tower attracted other tenants, such as part of the Minnesota Court of Appeals, but they faced competition from Town Square, Galtier Plaza, and the World Trade Center of St. Paul (now Wells Fargo Place). Eventually, by 1987, almost all of the office space in the tower had been leased, but the residential leasing was less successful.

=== Redevelopment ===
In 2022, developer Sherman Associates proposed converting almost all of the building to residential use, at an estimated cost of $80 to $85 million. The developer cited an office occupancy of less than 10 percent in the first to nineteenth floors, as well as a greater demand for housing in downtown areas with proximity to restaurants, theater, art, and sports venues. The conversion would depend heavily on financing, with historic tax credits driven by the National Register nomination.
