= Inno City =

- Interactive map of Inno City
- Location: Yangon, Myanmar
- Address: South Okkalapa Township
- Coordinates: 16.8545661264345°N 96.16741708323735°E
- Status: Under construction
- Constructed: 2016
- Estimated completion: 2021
- Website: www.innocitymyanmar.com

Companies
- Developer: Inno Group; Myanma Economic Holdings Limited

Technical details
- Size: 7.63 acres (3.09 ha)
- Proposed: 2015

Inno City is a major mixed use development in South Okkalapa Township, Yangon, Myanmar. The development includes three 30-storey and two 29-storey serviced apartment buildings, and a 13-floor business hotel, convention center, and bus terminal. The development was built as a build-operate-transfer by South Korean Inno Group.

Myanmar Investment Commission approved the project in April 2015, and Yangon City Development Committee subsequently approved it in September 2015. The development is a build-operate-transfer with 50-year terms. Construction began in January 2016.

== Controversy ==
The development has courted significant controversy over its links to military-owned company Myanma Economic Holdings Limited (MEHL). The controversy was sparked by a 2019 United Nations report that recommended targeted sanctions on businesses with connections to the Burmese military.

In November 2020, human rights groups, including Justice for Myanmar, filed a complaint with the National Human Rights Commission of Korea and the UN Working Group on Business and Human Rights to intervene and pressure Inno Group to cut business ties with the Burmese military.

== See also ==
- Economy of Myanmar
- Yangon
