= Downtown Yangon =

Downtown Yangon ရန်ကုန်မြို့လယ် Yangon Central Business District
- Neighborhood of the City of Yangon
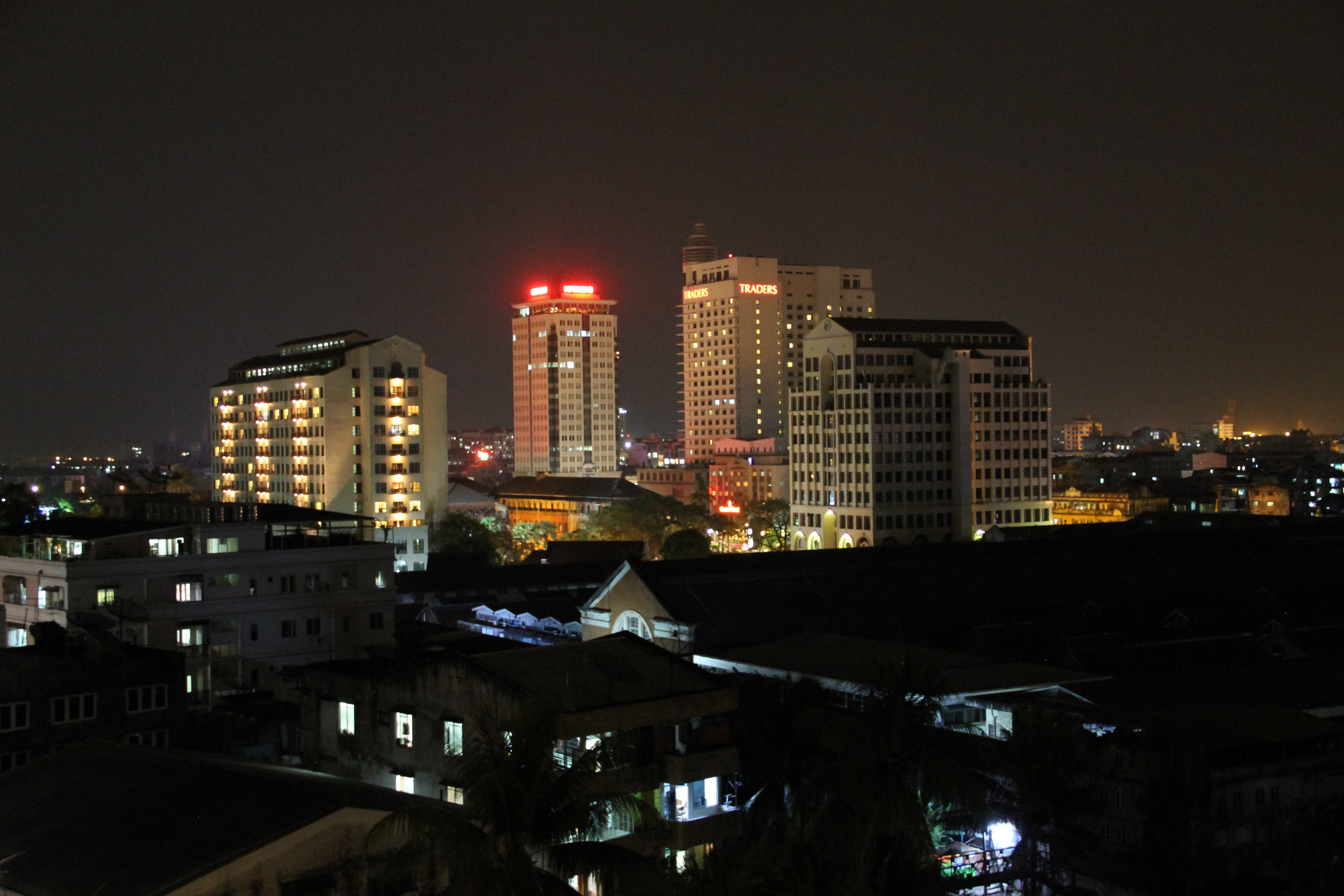
- Downtown skyline during sunset, April 2010
- Nicknames: "The Garden City of the East", "CBD", "Downtown"
- Interactive map of Downtown Yangon
- Coordinates: 16.777098°N 96.161113°E
- Country: Myanmar
- Region: Yangon Region
- City: Yangon

Government
  - Mayor: Maung Maung Soe

Area
  - Total: 3.297 sq mi (8.538 km^{2})

Downtown Yangon (also known as the Yangon Central Business District or Yangon CBD, formerly the Cantonment) is the central business district of Yangon, Myanmar, located close to the geographic centre of the metropolitan area. The area features many of the city's major arts institutions and sports facilities.

== History ==
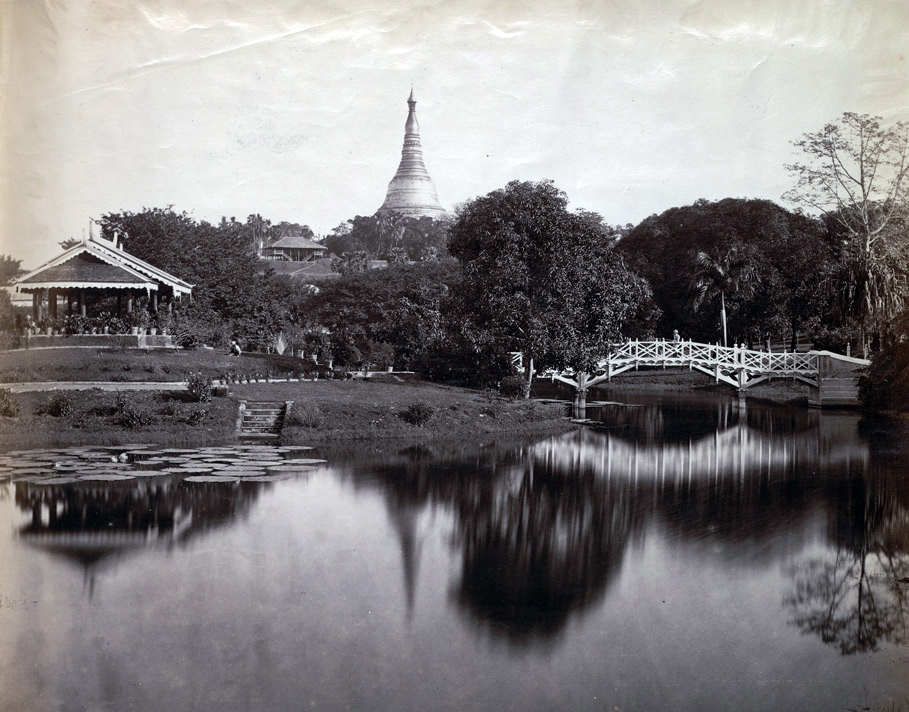
A view of the Cantonment Gardens (now Kantawmin Park) in 1868.

The east-west grid of downtown Yangon was laid out by British military engineers Alexander Fraser and Montgomerie after the Second Anglo-Burmese War in 1852. The city was later developed by the Public Works Department and Bengal Corps of Engineers.

The majority of sites on the Yangon City Heritage List are located in Yangon's CBD.

== Architecture ==
Yangon's CBD is known for its leafy avenues and fin-de-siècle architecture. The former British colonial capital has the highest number of colonial period buildings in Southeast Asia. The CBD is still mainly made up of decaying colonial buildings. The former High Court, the former Secretariat buildings, the former St. Paul's English High School and the Strand Hotel are excellent examples of the bygone era. Most buildings in the CBD from this era are four-story mixed-use (residential and commercial) buildings with 14-foot (4.3 m) ceilings, allowing for the construction of mezzanines. Despite their less-than-perfect conditions, the buildings remain highly sought after and most expensive in the city's property market.

In 1996, the Yangon City Development Committee created a Yangon City Heritage List of old buildings and structures in the city that cannot be modified or torn down without approval. In 2012, the city of Yangon imposed a 50-year moratorium on demolition of buildings older than 50 years. The Yangon Heritage Trust, an NGO started by Thant Myint-U, aims to create heritage areas in Downtown, and attract investors to renovate buildings for commercial use.

== Boundaries ==
Geographically, the CBD is bound by the Pun Hlaing River to the west, the Hlaing River to the south, and Pazundaung Creek to the east.

== Transportation ==
The pattern of south to north roads is as follows: one broad 100-foot (30 m) wide broad road, two narrow streets, one mid-size street, two more narrow streets, and then another 100-foot (30 m) wide broad road. This order is repeated from west to east. The narrow streets are numbered; the medium and broad roads are named.

For instance, the 100-foot (30 m) Lanmadaw Road is followed by 30-foot (9.1 m)-wide 17th and 18th streets then the medium 50-foot (15 m) Sint-Oh-Dan Road, the 30-foot 19th and 20th streets, followed by another 100-foot (30 m) wide Latha Road, followed again by the two numbered small roads 21st and 22nd streets, and so on.

The roads running parallel west to east were the Strand Road, Merchant Road, Maha Bandula (née Dalhousie) Road, Anawrahta (Fraser) Road, and Bogyoke Aung San (Montgomerie) Road.

The CBD's road layout follows a grid pattern, based on four types of roads:

- Broad 160-foot (49-m) wide roads running west to east
- Broad 100-foot (30-m) wide roads running south to north
- Two narrow 30-foot (9.1-m) wide streets running south to north
- Mid-size 50-foot (15-m) wide streets running south to north

Since February 2010, pickup truck bus lines have been forbidden to run in 6 townships of the CBD, namely Latha, Lanmadaw, Pabedan, Kyauktada, Botahtaung and Pazundaung Townships. In May 2003, a ban on using car horns was implemented in six townships of the CBD to reduce noise pollution. In April 2004, the car horn ban was expanded to cover the entire city.

== Gallery ==
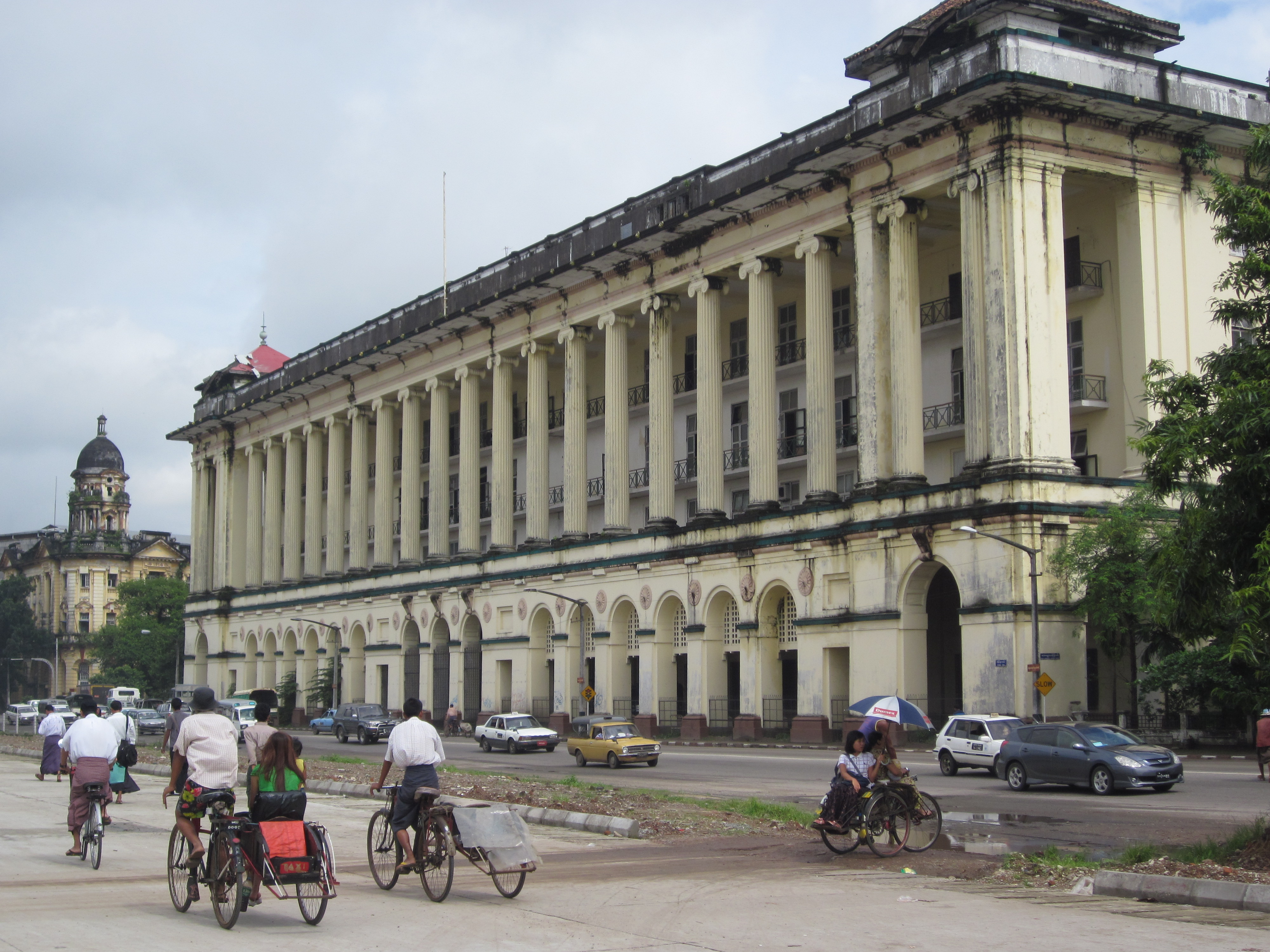
The Yangon Region Court building on Strand Road

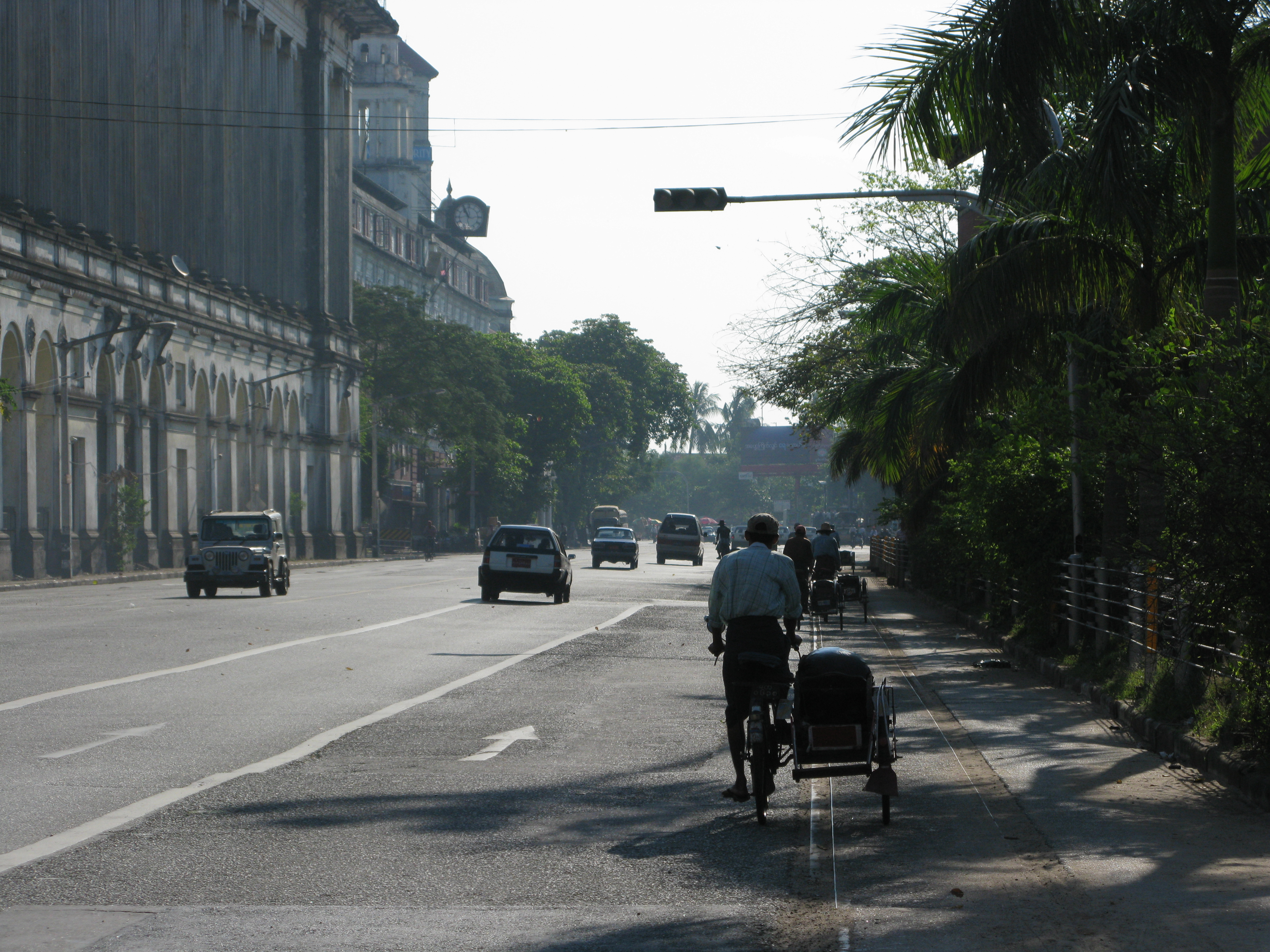
Strand Road

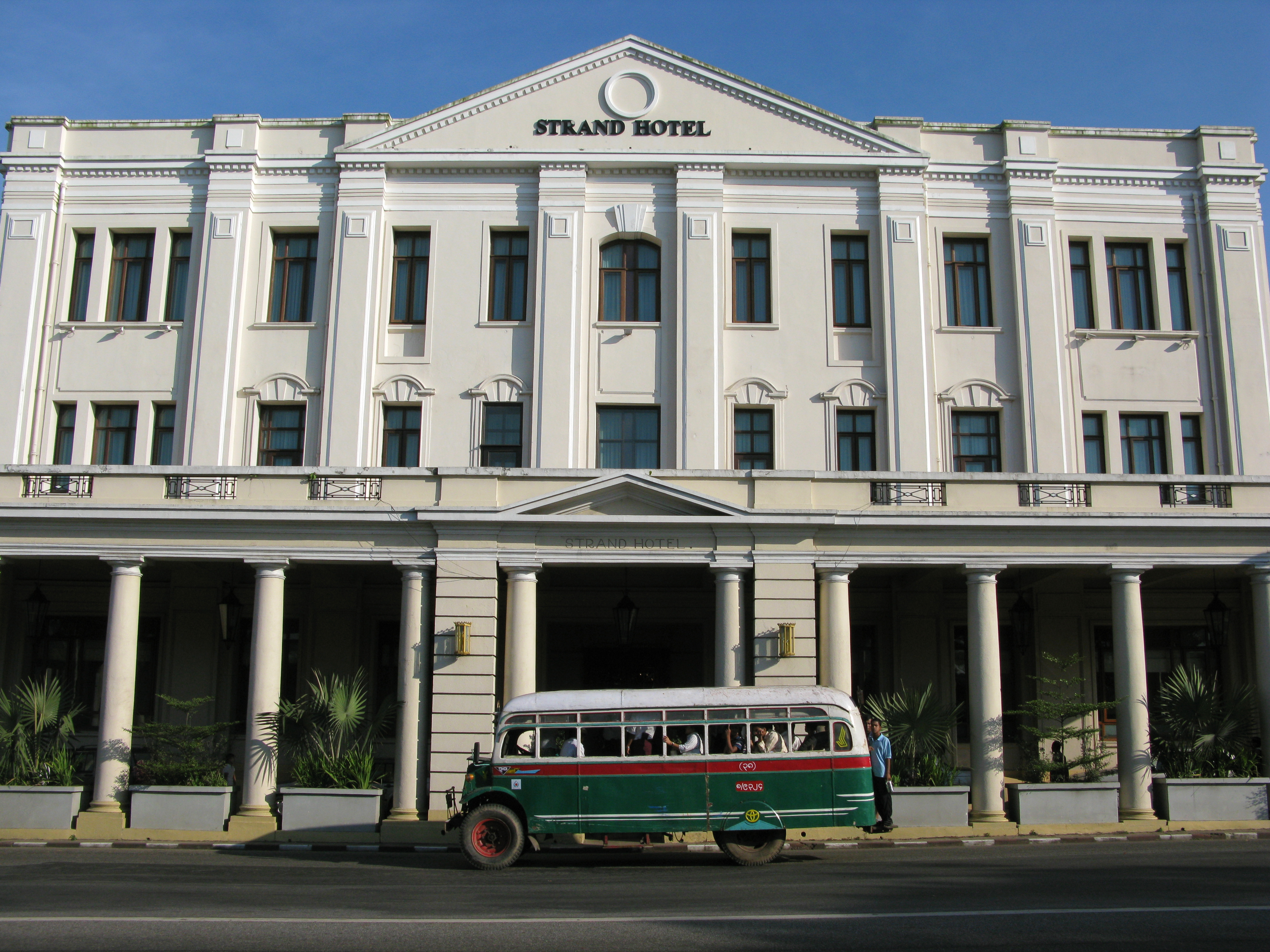
Strand Hotel

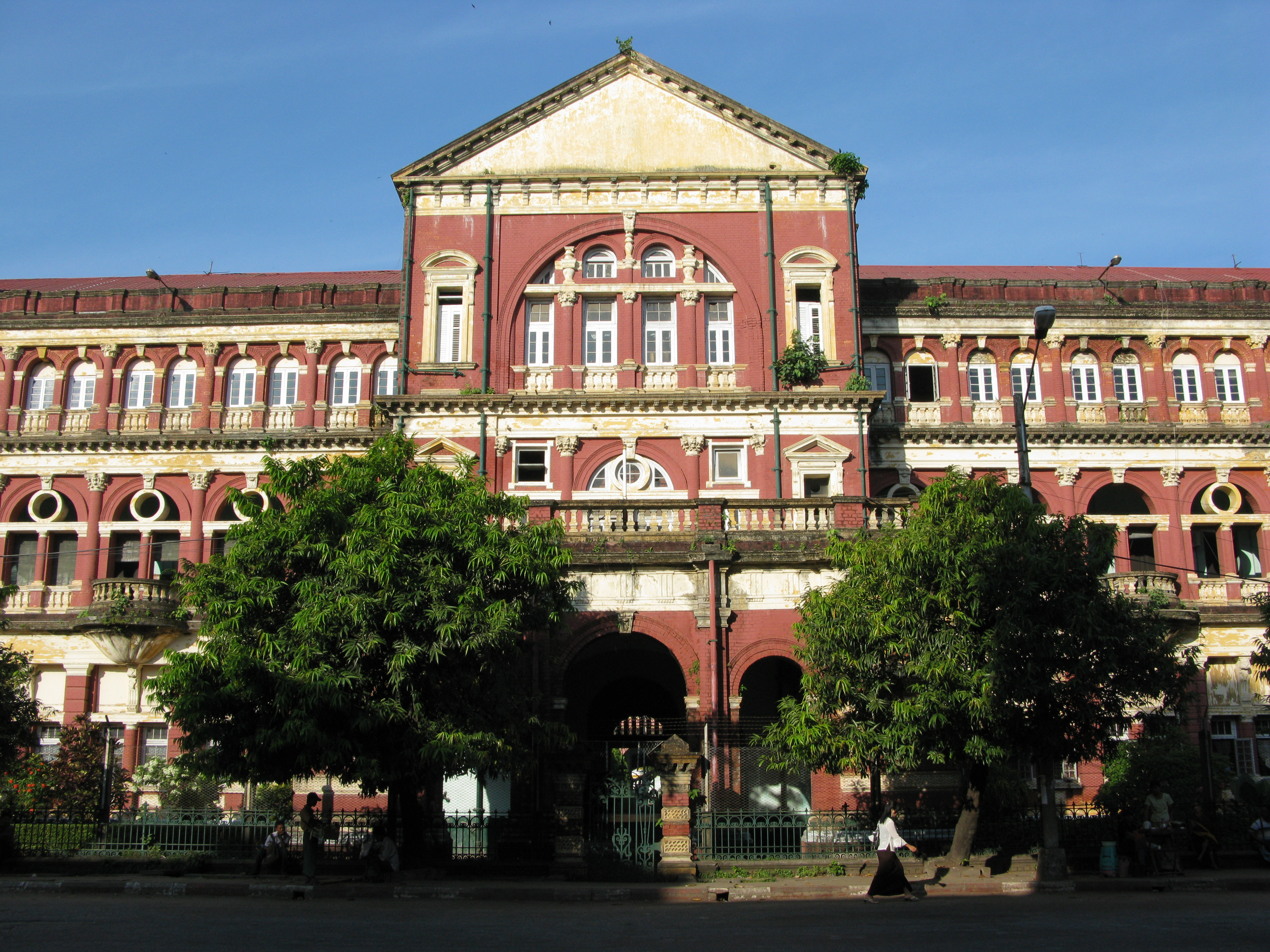
Former Burmese High Court, Yangon High Court

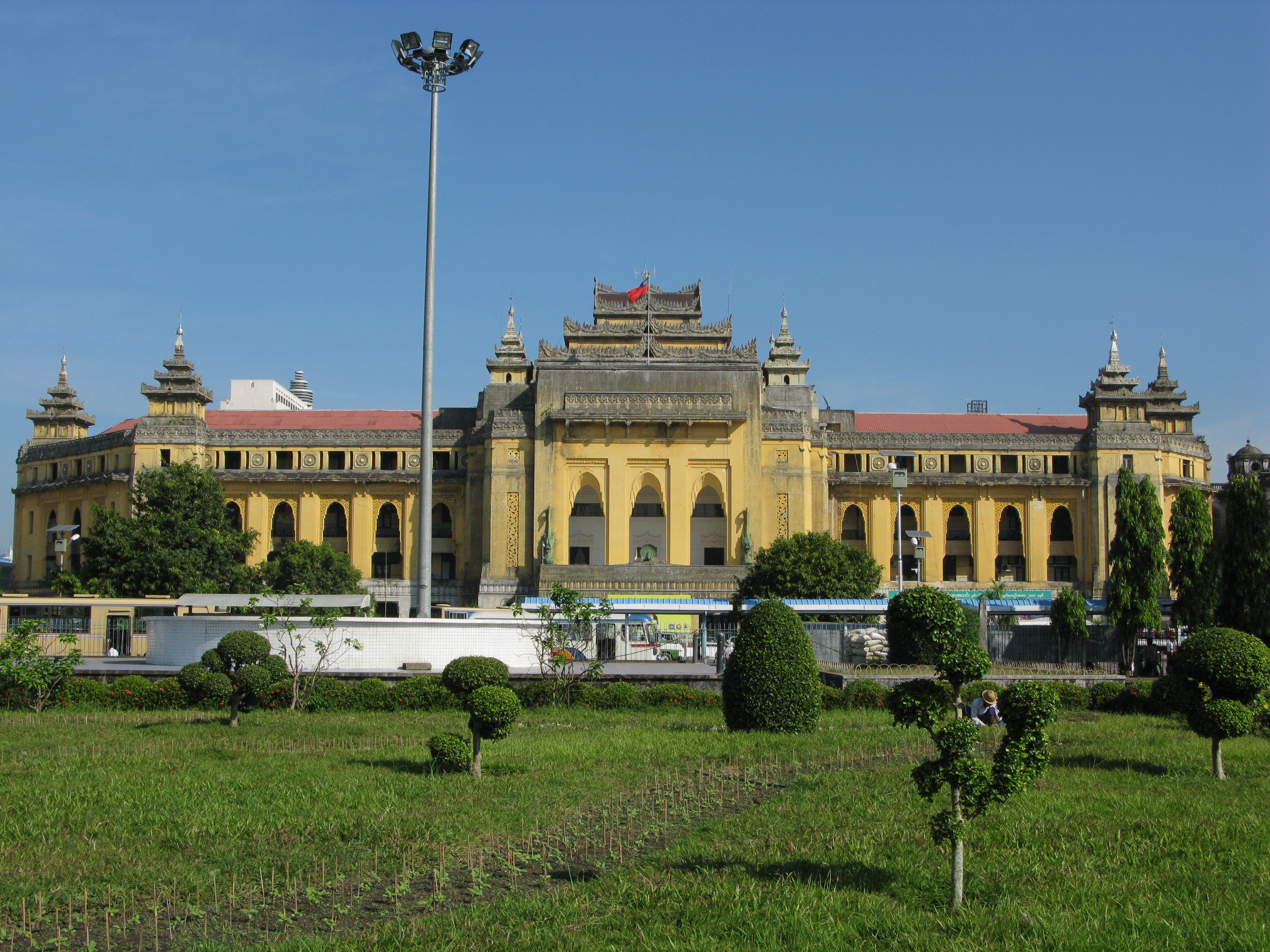
Yangon City Hall
