= Myanmar Plaza =

- Myanmar Plaza
- Location: Yangon, Myanmar
- Coordinates: 16.8282°N 96.1550°E
- Address: 192 Kabar Aye Pagoda Rd
- Opened: 5 December 2015
- Developer: Hoang Anh Gia Lai (HAGL)
- Owner: Hoang Anh Gia Lai (HAGL)
- Num. of stores: ~100
- Num. of anchor tenants: 3
- Floors: 5
- Website: myanmarplaza.com.mm

Myanmar Plaza (Burmese: မြန်မာပလာဇာ) is one of the largest shopping malls in Yangon, Myanmar (Burma). The plaza consists of retail outlets, including home appliance and electronics stores, lifestyle shops, and beauty and fashion shops, and a 4,000 square metres (43,056 sq ft) food court with cafes, fast food, dining and teashops. The pavilion also holds a 2,000 square metres (21,528 sq ft) outlet for Marketplace, a grocery store.

== History ==
Myanmar Plaza opened on 5 December 2015. It is owned by Vietnam’s Hoang Anh Gia Lai (HAGL). The Myanmar Plaza is part of the Myanmar Centre, a $440-million mixed-use development with office towers, a hotel and residential apartments.

In 2016, The Spanish-owned Meliá Yangon, a five-star hotel attached to the plaza, was completed.

In the aftermath of the 2021 Myanmar coup d'etat, Myanmar Plaza has been the target of anti-coup protesters. On 7 April 2021, a small grenade was launched inside the mall. On 25 November 2021, the mall's security team courted significant criticism after using force to break up a flash mob protest staged inside the mall. In response, protesters launched an ongoing boycott movement against the mall.

== Location ==
Myanmar Plaza is part of the Myanmar Centre and located in a five-storey building on Kabar Aye Pagoda Road, Bahan Township, Yangon, at the intersection of Kabar Aye Pagoda Road and No.1 Industrial Road.

== Events ==
Myanmar Plaza has a large promotion hall (inside and outside) to hold events. The center hosted the Toyota Vios official launch event in 2016.

== See also ==
- Yuzana Plaza
