= Kyauktada Township =

Kyauktada Township ကျောက်တံတား မြို့နယ်
- Township of Yangon
- Kyauktada Township
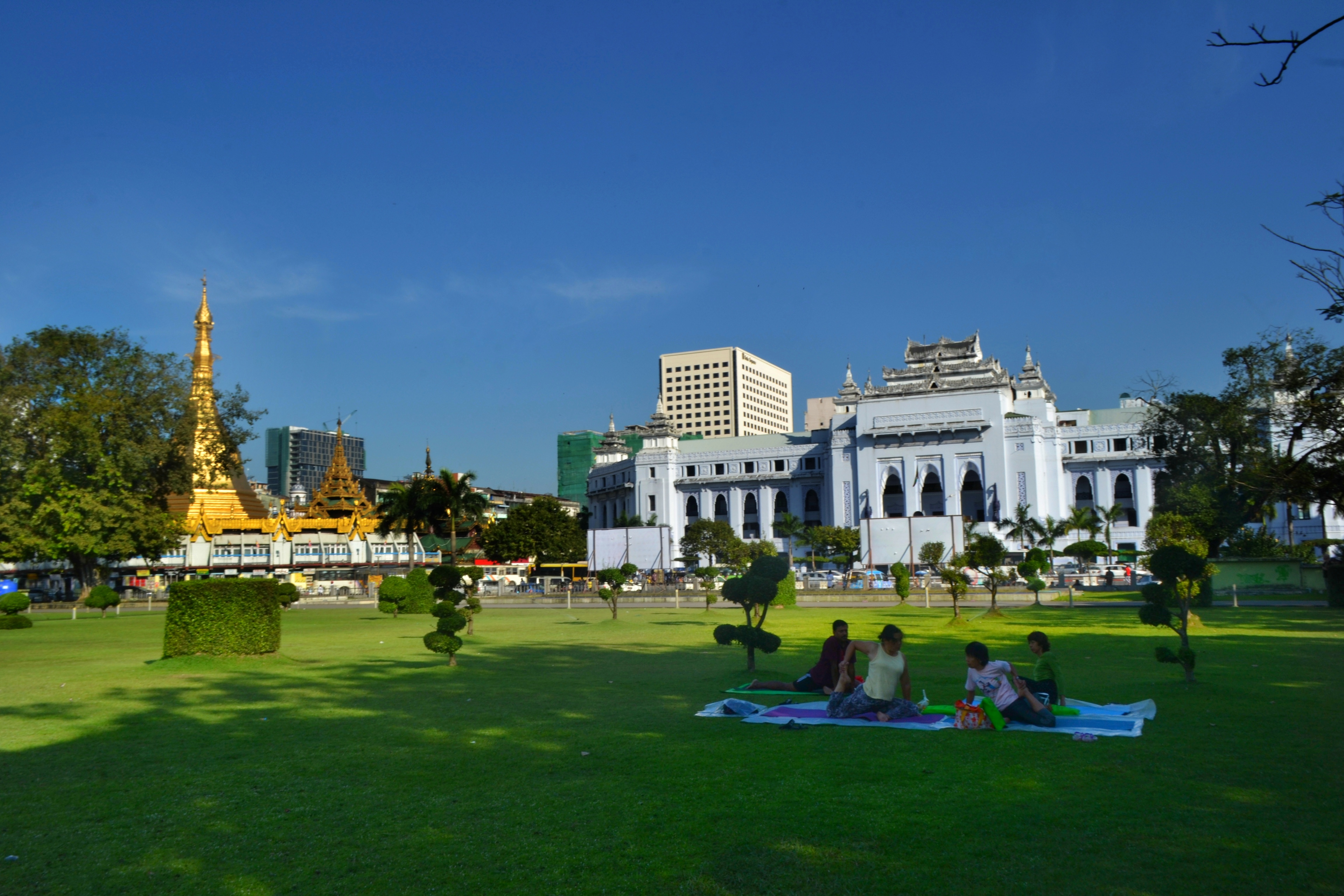
- City Hall and the Sule Pagoda as seen from Maha Bandula Park

- Location within Myanmar
- Coordinates: 16°46′27.92″N 96°9′31.52″E
- Country: Myanmar
- Region: Yangon Region
- City: Yangon
- District: Kyauktada District

Area
  - Total: 0.65 km^{2} (0.25 sq mi)

Population (2000)
  - Total: 37,000
  - Density: 57,000/km^{2} (150,000/sq mi)
- Time zone: UTC6:30 (MST)
- Postal codes: 11181, 11182
- Area codes: 1; (mobile: 80, 99)

Kyauktada Township (Burmese: ကျောက်တံတား မြို့နယ် [tɕaʊʔdədá mjo̰nɛ̀]) is the center of downtown Yangon, Myanmar. The township consists of nine wards, and shares borders with Botataung Township in the east, Seikkan Township and Yangon River in the south, Pabedan Township in the west and Mingala Taungnyunt Township in the north.

The township is home to many historic buildings, including the Sule Pagoda, the City Hall, the High Court Building, the Strand Hotel as well as embassies of the UK and India. Three of the tallest buildings in Yangon, the Traders Hotel (now Sule Shangri-La), the Sakura Tower, and the Center Point Tower are located in Kyauktada. Many government offices are headquartered here. Maha Bandula Park across from Sule Pagoda and the city hall is a major recreational area in the downtown area.

The township has five primary schools, one middle school and one high school. Many of its school children attend high schools in nearby townships of Botataung and Pabedan.

Lily (Nyein Nyein Thu) is the first contestant from Kyauktada Township to represent the area at the Miss Universe Myanmar pageant.

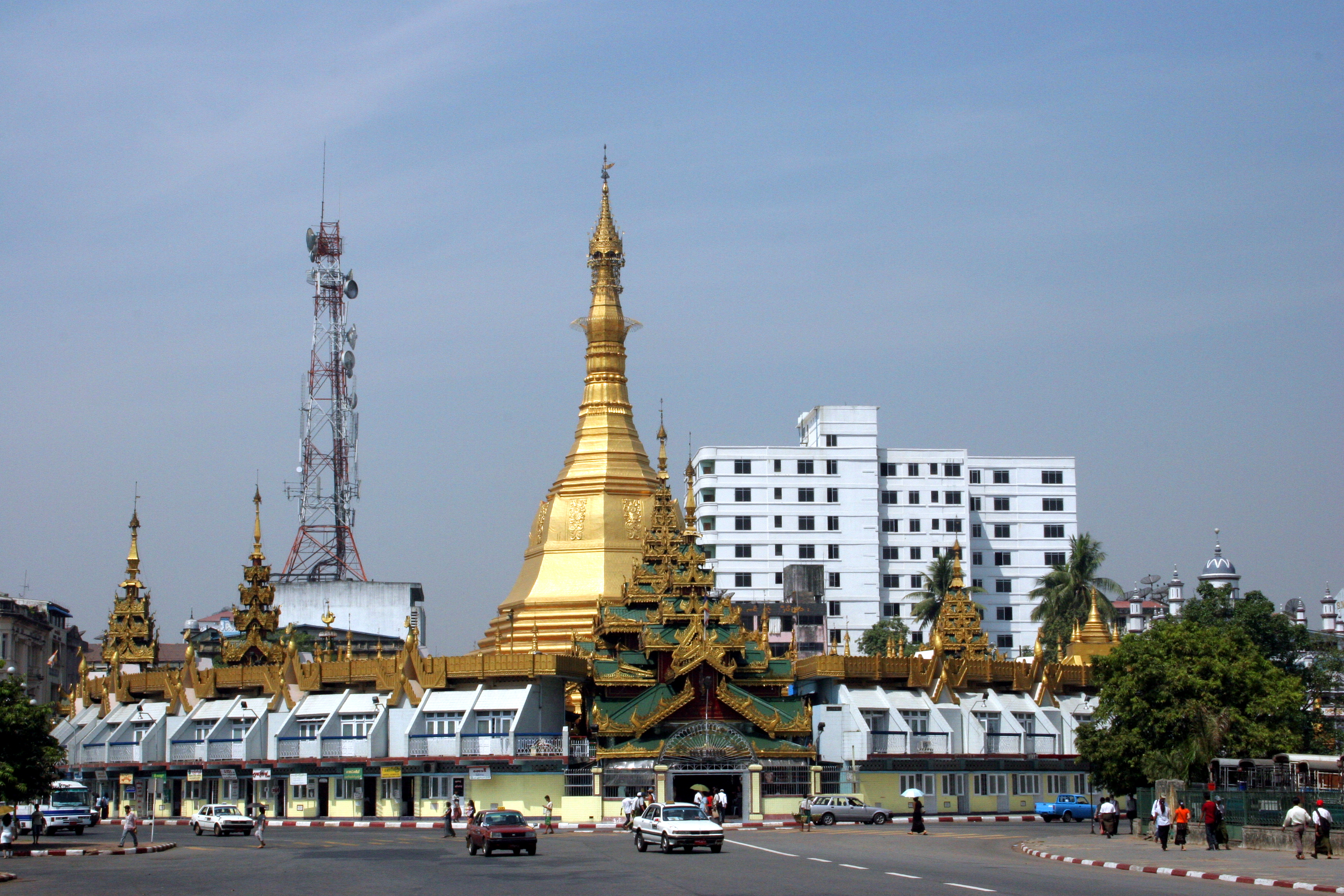
Sule Pagoda

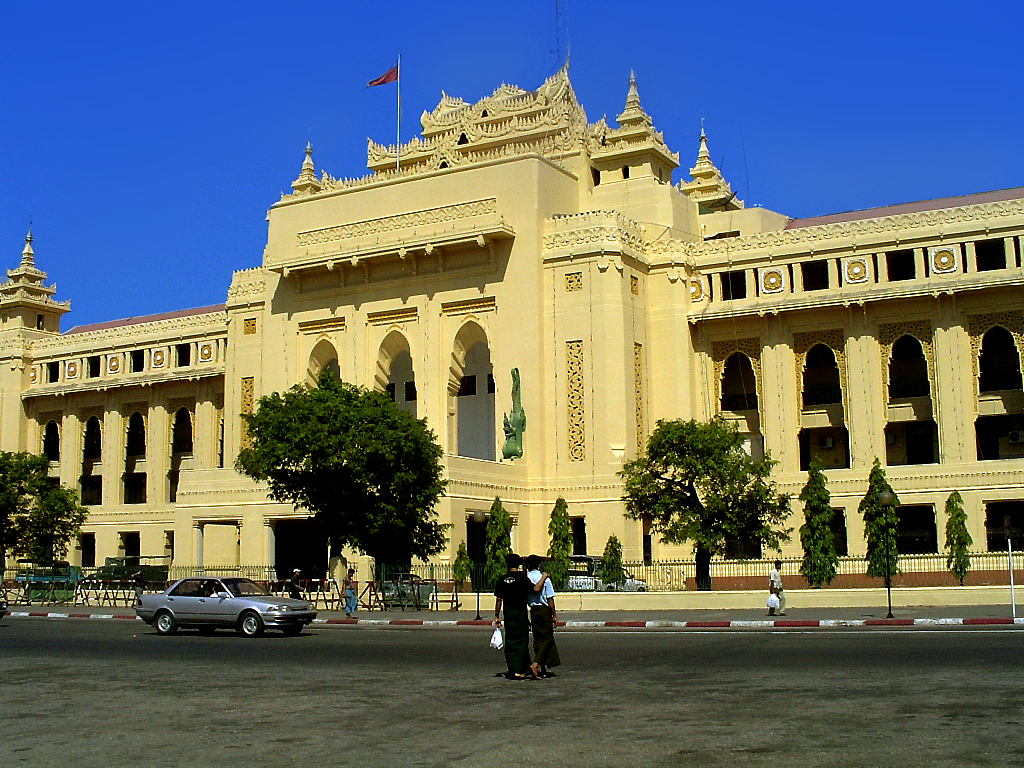
Yangon City Hall

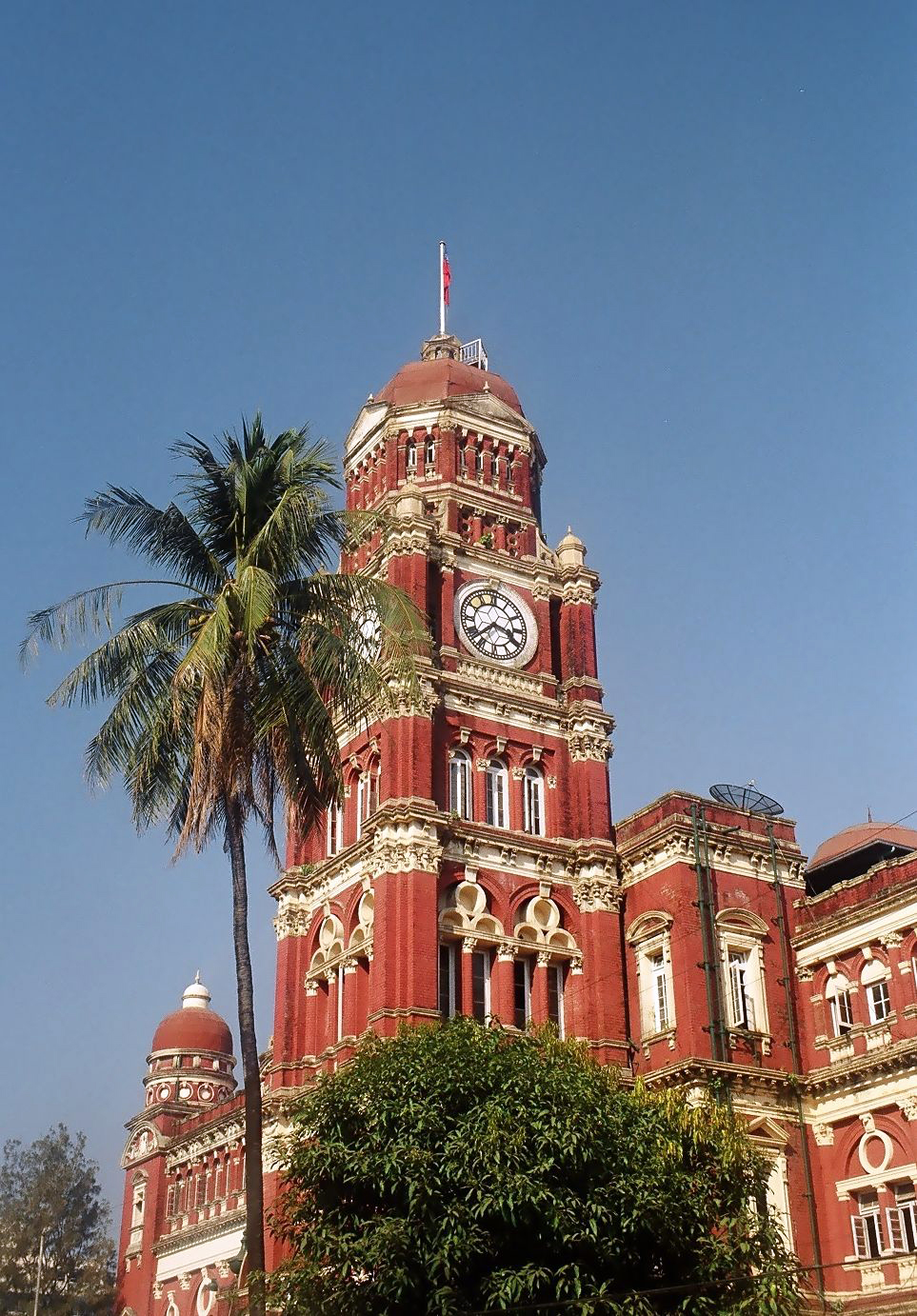
The former High Court building in downtown Yangon

Sakura Tower (80+m), one of the few modern office buildings in Yangon

== Landmarks ==
As Kyauktada township was part of the original city plan implemented by the British, it is dotted with many colonial era buildings, including 39 landmark buildings and structures protected by the city.

Structure	Type	Address	Notes
Central Bank of Myanmar	Government office	24-26 Sule Pagoda Road	Old Central Bank building
Central Fire Station	Government office	137-139 Sule Pagoda Road	
Central Post Office		39-41 Bo Aung Kyaw Road (and Merchant Road)	
Central Naval Hydrographic Depot	Government office	55-61 Strand Road	
City Hall	Government office	Maha Bandula Road	
Customs House		132 Strand Road	
Emmanuel Baptist Church	Church	411 Maha Bandula Garden Street (and Maha Bandula Road)	
Department of Fire Services	Government office	127-133 Sule Pagoda Road	
Department of Information and Public Relations	Government office	22-24 Pansodan Road	
Department of Immigration and Registration	Government office	416 Maha Bandula Garden Street (and Maha Bandula Road)	
Department of Internal Revenue	Government office	55-61 Pansodan Road	
Department of Labour	Government office	138-158 Pansodan Road (and Maha Bandula Road)	
Department of Pensions	Government office	27 Bank Street	
Embassy of Australia	Embassy	88 Strand Road	
Embassy of India	Embassy	545-547 Merchant Road (and 36th Street)	
Embassy of UK	Embassy	80 Strand Road	
Embassy of USA	Embassy	581 Merchant Road	
High Court	Court	89-133 Pansodan Road	Former High Court building
Inland Water Transport		44-54 Pansodan Road	
Methodist Church	Church	239 Seikkantha Road	
Ministry of Hotel and Tourism	Government office	77-91 Sule Pagoda Road	
Myanma Agricultural and Village Tract Development Bank		526-532 Merchant Road	
Myanma Economic Bank	Government office	564 Maha Bandula Garden Street (and Merchant Road)	
Myanma Economic Bank Branch-2 and Savings Bank Branch-4	Government office	27-41 Pansodan Road	
Myanma Economic Bank Branch-3	Government office	15-19 Sule Pagoda Road (and Strand Road)	
Myanma Export Import Enterprise	Government office	579 Merchant Road (and Maha Bandula Garden Street)	
Myanma Insurance	Government office	142-144 Sule Pagoda Road	
Myanma Industrial Development Bank	Government office	26-42 Pansodan Road	
Myanma Insurance (Fire & Engineering)	Government office	128-132 Pansodan Road	
Myanma Posts and Telecommunications	Government office	125-133 Pansodan Road (and Maha Bandula Road)	
Myanma Port Authority	Government office	2-20 Pansodan Road	
Science & Technology Division, Cybermec		550-552 Merchant Road	
Strand Hotel	Hotel	92 Strand Road	
Sule Pagoda	Pagoda	Sule Pagoda Road	
Sunni Jamah Bengali Mosque	Mosque	93 Sule Pagoda Road	
Surti Sunni Jamah Mosque	Mosque	224-228 35th Street	
Yangon Division Office Complex	Government office	56-66 Bank Street	Old Police Commissioner's Office
Yangon Division Statistics Office	Government office	22-34 Bank Street	
Yangon Divisional Court (Civil)	Court	1 Pansodan Road	
