= Yangon =

Largest city of Myanmar

Yangon ရန်ကုန် Rangoon
- City
- Yangon City
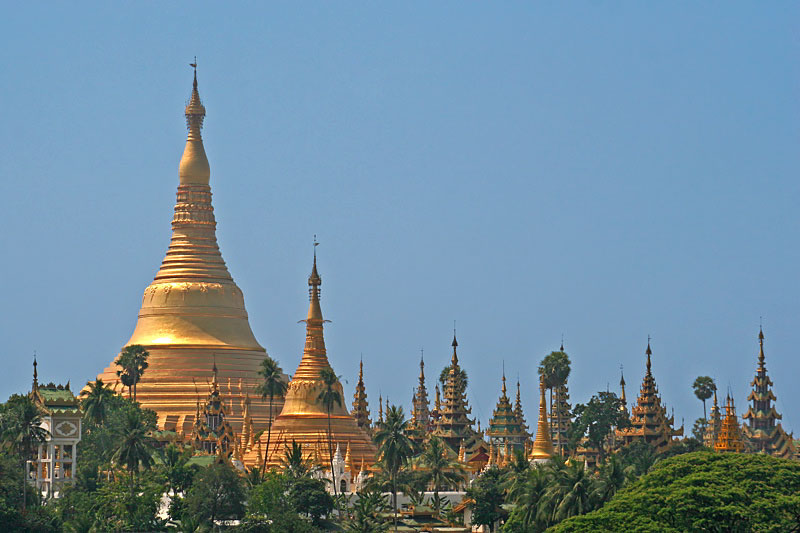
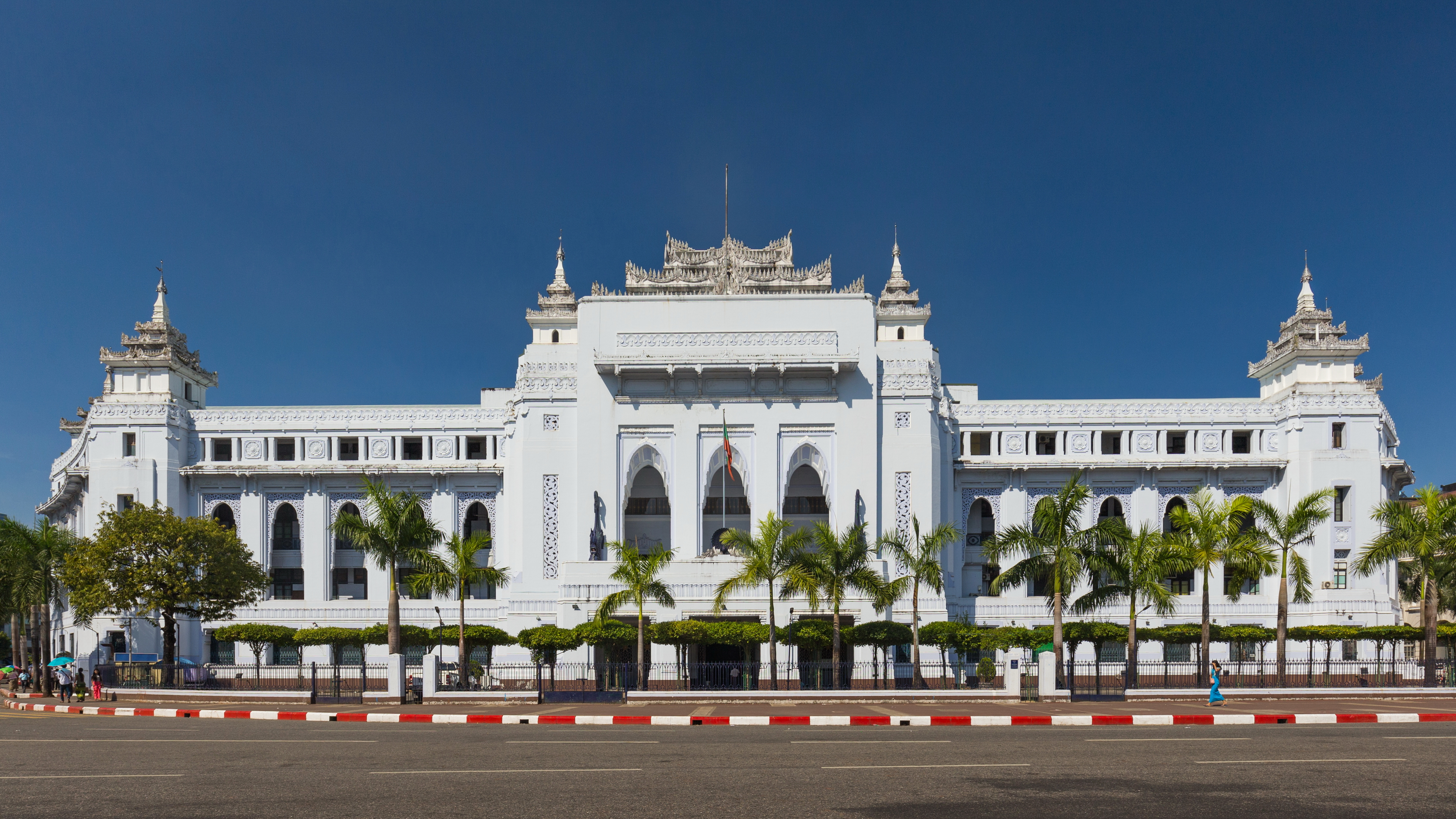
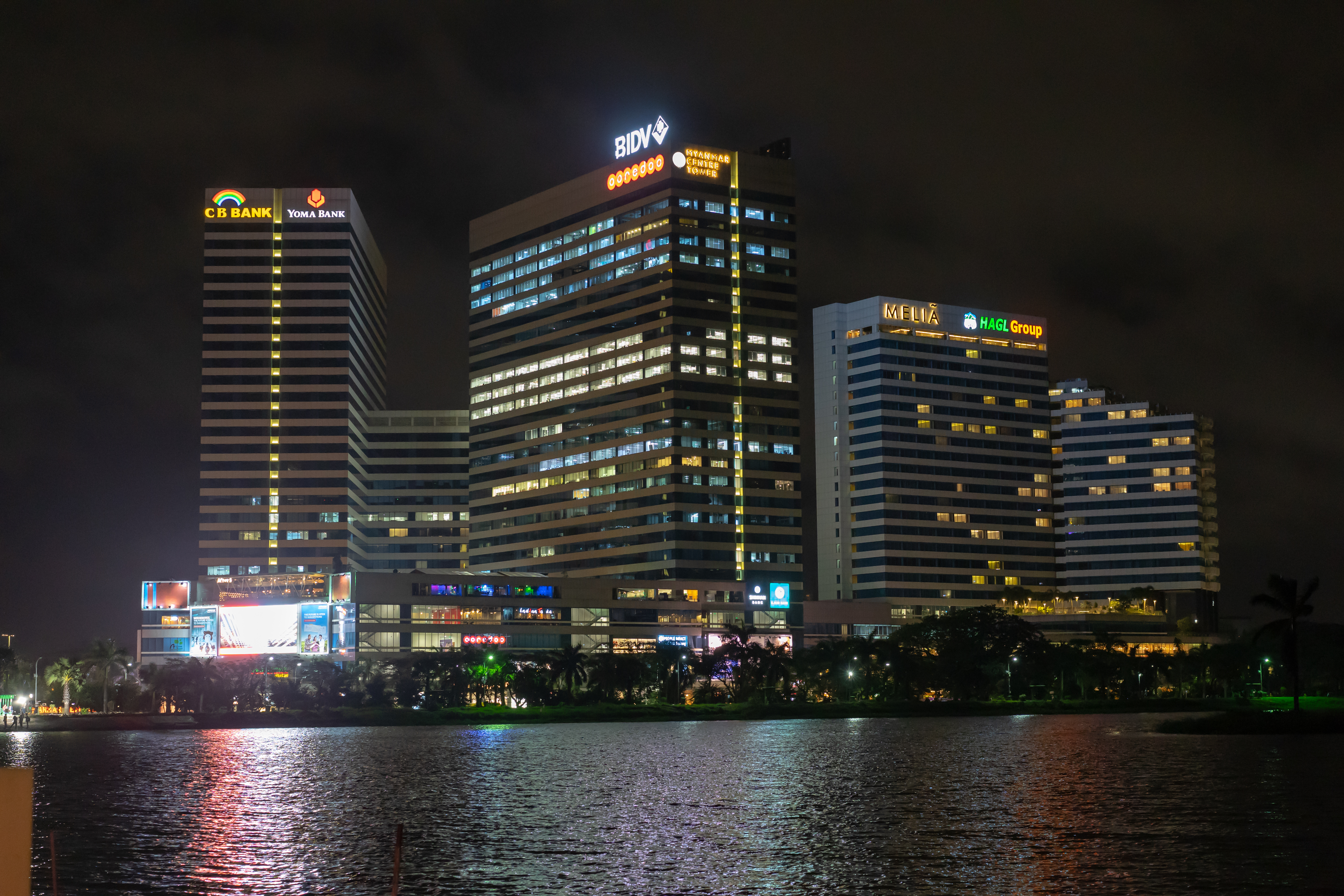
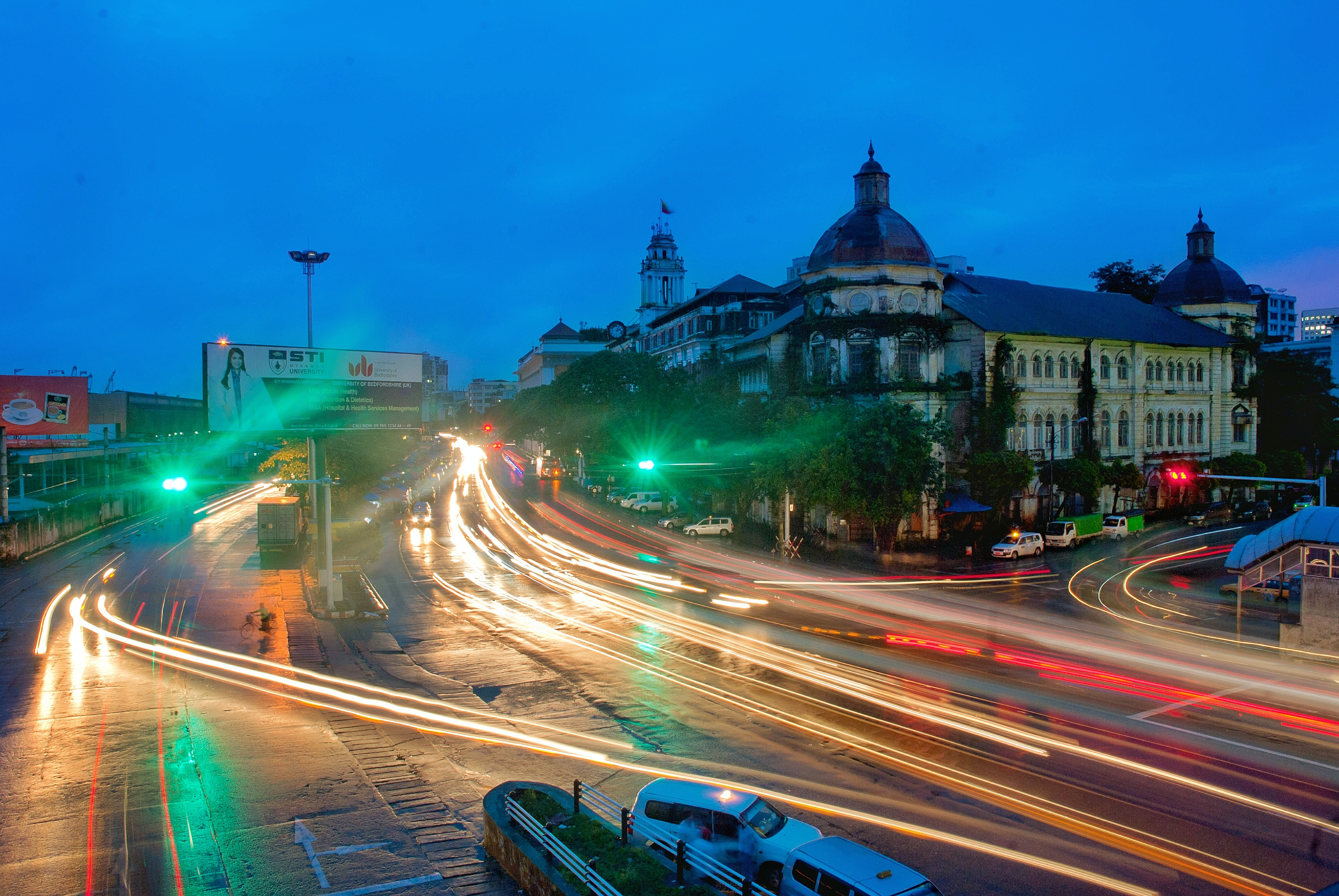
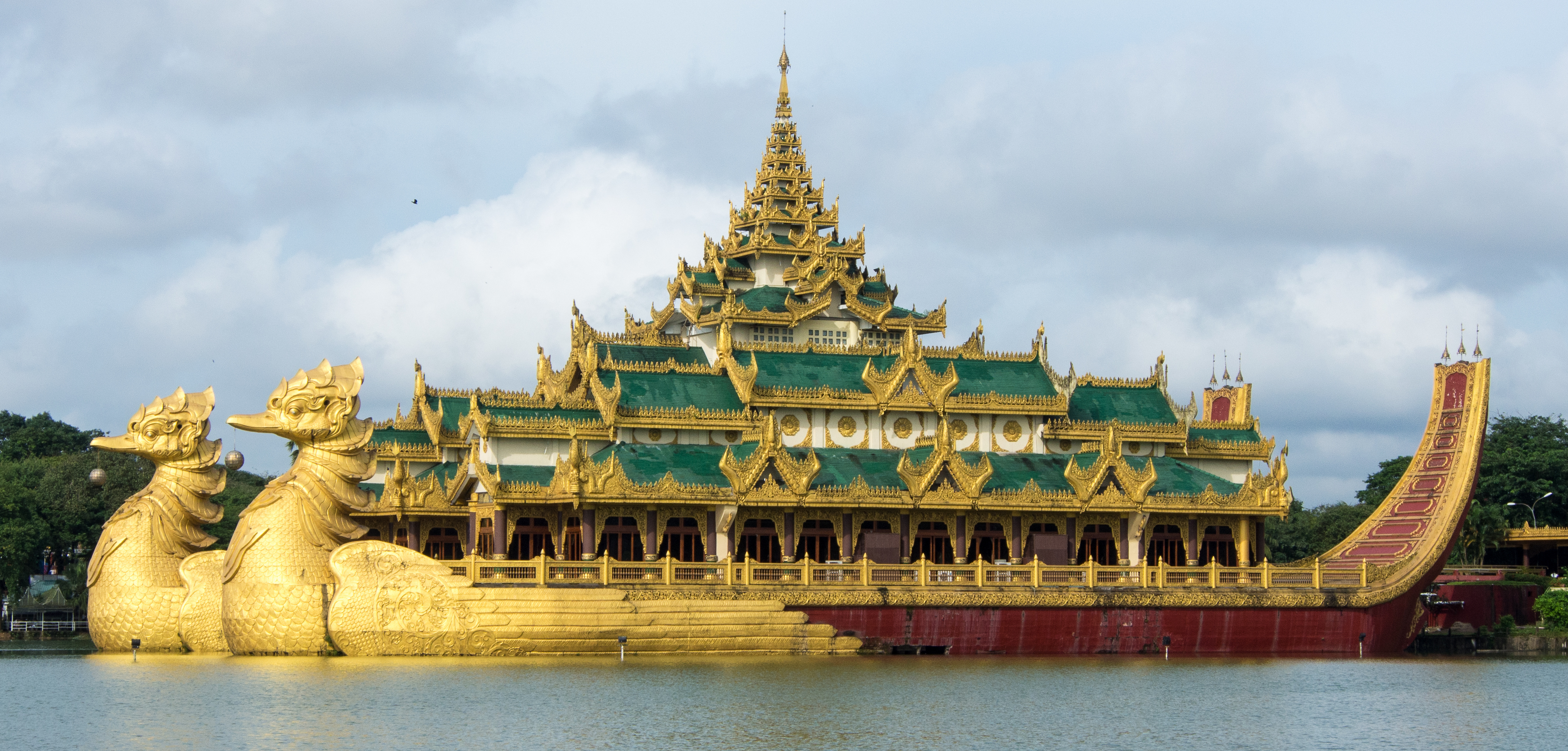
- Shwedagon Pagoda Yangon City Hall Downtown Yangon Colonial-era buildings along Strand Road The Karaweik at Kandawgyi Lake

- Flag

- Location of Yangon, Myanmar Yangon (Southeast Asia) Yangon (Asia)
- Coordinates (Asia/Yangon): 16°47′42″N 96°09′36″E
- Country: Myanmar
- Region: Yangon Region
- Settled: c. 1028–1043 CE

Government
  - Body: Yangon City Development Committee
  - Mayor: U Myo Myint Aung

Area
  - Urban: 598.75 km^{2} (231.18 sq mi)
  - Metro: 10,170 km^{2} (3,930 sq mi)
  - Rank: division

Population (2014 Census)
  - Rank: 1st in Myanmar
  - Urban: 5,160,512
  - Urban density: 8,618.8/km^{2} (22,323/sq mi)
  - Rural: 2,200,191
  - Metro: 7,360,703 (Yangon Region)
  - Metro density: 723.8/km^{2} (1,875/sq mi)
  - Ethnicities: List of ethnicities: Bamar; Burmese Chinese; Burmese Indians; Chin; Rakhine; Mon; Karen; Shan; Kayah; Kachin
  - Religions: List of religions: Buddhism 91%; Islam 4.7%; Christianity 3.2%; Hinduism 1.0%; Others 0.1%
- Demonym: Yangonite

GDP
  - Metro: US$ 10.7 billion (2016)
- Time zones: UTC+06:30 (Asia/Yangon or Asia/Rangoon)
- UTC+06:30 (Myanmar Time)
- Area code: 01
- Geocode: Yangon
- ISO 3166 code: MM06
- Vehicle registration: YGN
- Website: yangon.gov.mm

Yangon, (Note: /ˌjæŋˈɡɒn/; Burmese: ရန်ကုန်; pronounced [jàɰ̃.ɡòʊɰ̃], MLCTS Rankun) also romanized in English as Rangoon, is the capital city of the Yangon Region and the largest city of Myanmar. Yangon was the capital city of Myanmar until 2005 and served as such until 2006, when the military government relocated the administrative functions to the purpose-built capital city of Naypyidaw in north central Myanmar. With over five million people, Yangon is Myanmar's most populous city and its most important commercial centre.

Yangon boasts the largest number of colonial-era buildings in Southeast Asia, and has a unique colonial-era urban core that is remarkably intact. The colonial-era commercial core is centred around the Sule Pagoda, which is reputed to be over 2,000 years old. The city is also home to the gilded Shwedagon Pagoda – Myanmar's most sacred and famous Buddhist pagoda.

Yangon suffers from profoundly inadequate infrastructure, especially compared to other major cities in Southeast Asia, such as Jakarta, Bangkok or Hanoi. Rail transport is particularly lacking. Though many historic residential and commercial buildings have been renovated throughout central Yangon, most satellite towns that ring the city remain chronically impoverished and lack basic infrastructure.

== Etymology and pronunciation ==
The name Yangon (ရန်ကုန်) is derived from the combination of the Burmese words yan (ရန်) and koun (ကုန်), which mean 'enemies' and 'run out of', respectively. This word combination can be translated as 'End of Strife'.

The name is pronounced /ˌjæŋˈɡɒn/ yang-GON in British English and /ˌjɑːnˈɡoʊn/ yahn-GOHN in American English.

The English romanisation, Rangoon, is based on the Rakhine dialect, and pronounced /ræŋˈɡuːn/ rang-GOON in English.

== History ==
=== Early history ===
Yangon was founded as Dagon in the early 11th century (c. 1028–1043) by the Mon people, who inhabited Lower Burma at that time. Dagon became an important pilgrimage pagoda town, starting in the 14th century, during the Hanthawaddy kingdom. Notable governors of Dagon included Princess Maha Dewi, who ruled the town from 1364 to 1392, and her grandniece, Shin Saw Pu, who later became the only female queen regnant in Burmese history. Queen Saw Pu built a palace next to the Shwedagon Pagoda in the town in 1460 and spent her semi-retired life at that palace until she died in 1471.

In 1755, King Alaungpaya, the founder of the Konbaung dynasty, captured Dagon, added settlements around it, and called the enlarged town "Yangon". In the 1790s, the East India Company opened a factory in Yangon. The estimated population of Yangon in 1823 was about 30,000. The British captured Yangon during the First Anglo-Burmese War (1824–26), but returned the city to Burmese rule after the war. The city was destroyed by a fire in 1841.

=== Colonial Rangoon (1852–1948) ===
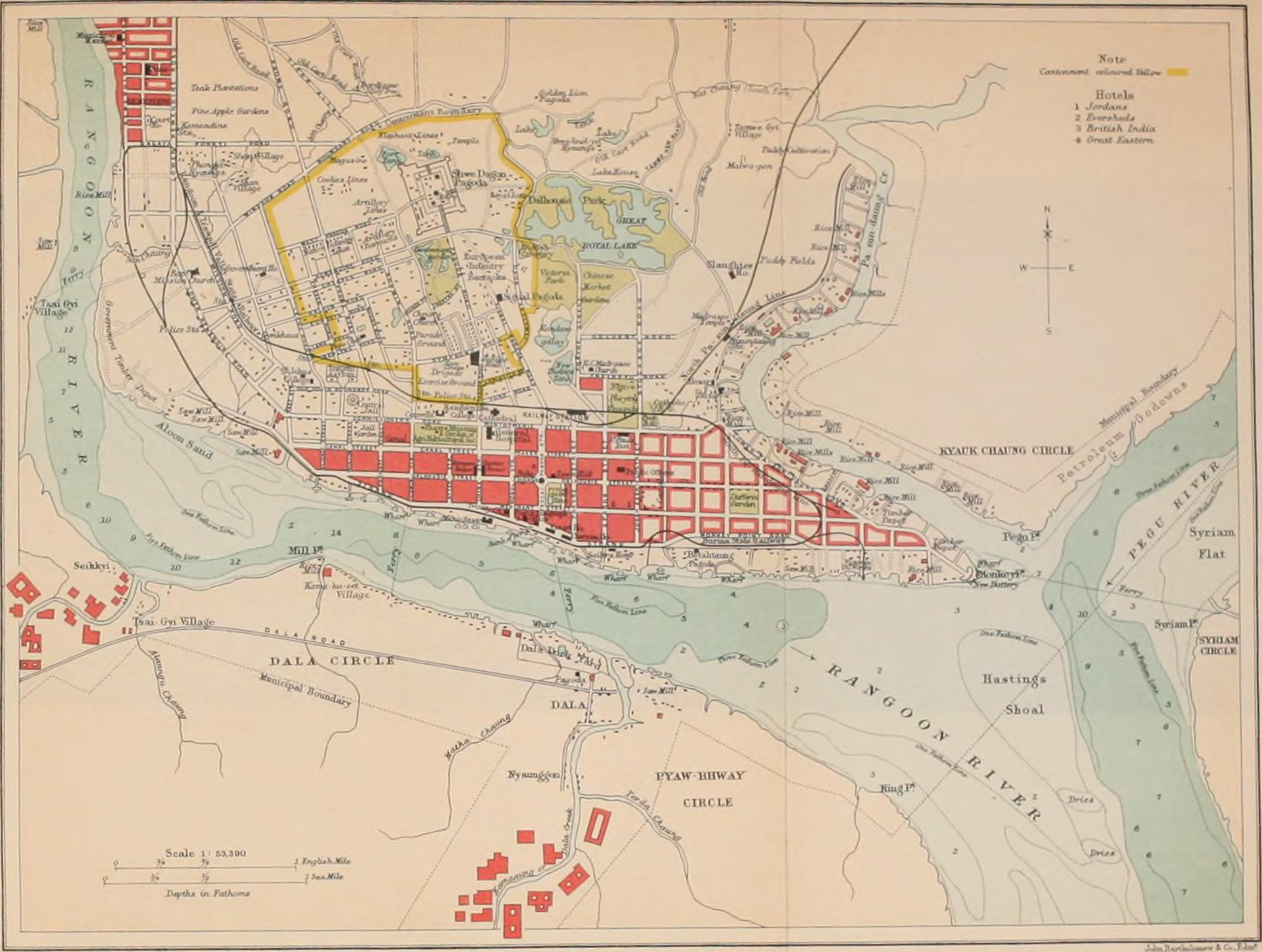
Rangoon and environs map, 1911

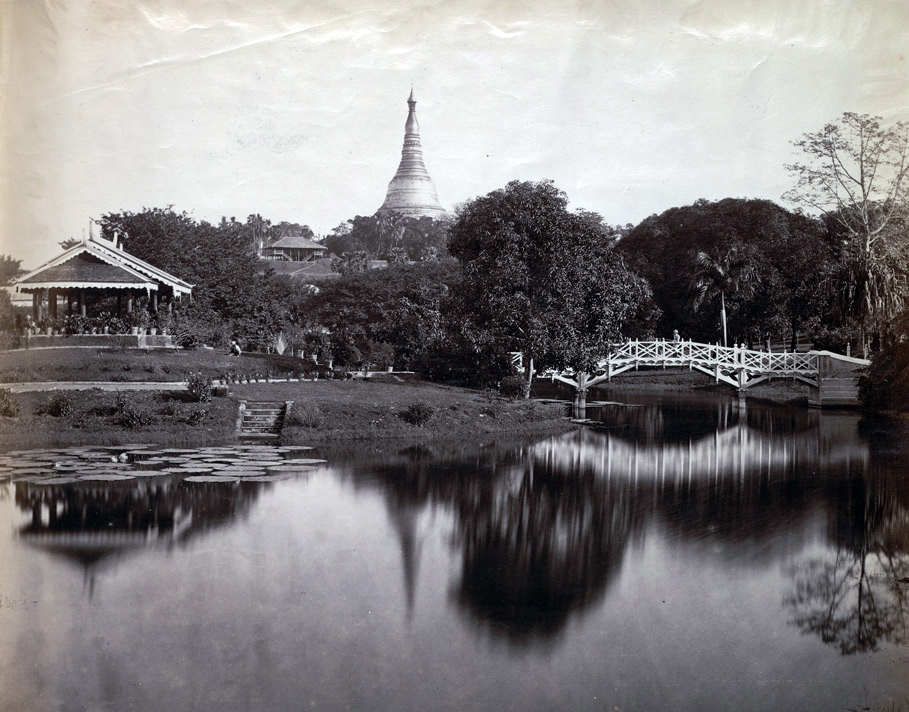
A view of the Cantonment Gardens (now Kandaw Minglar Garden) in 1868

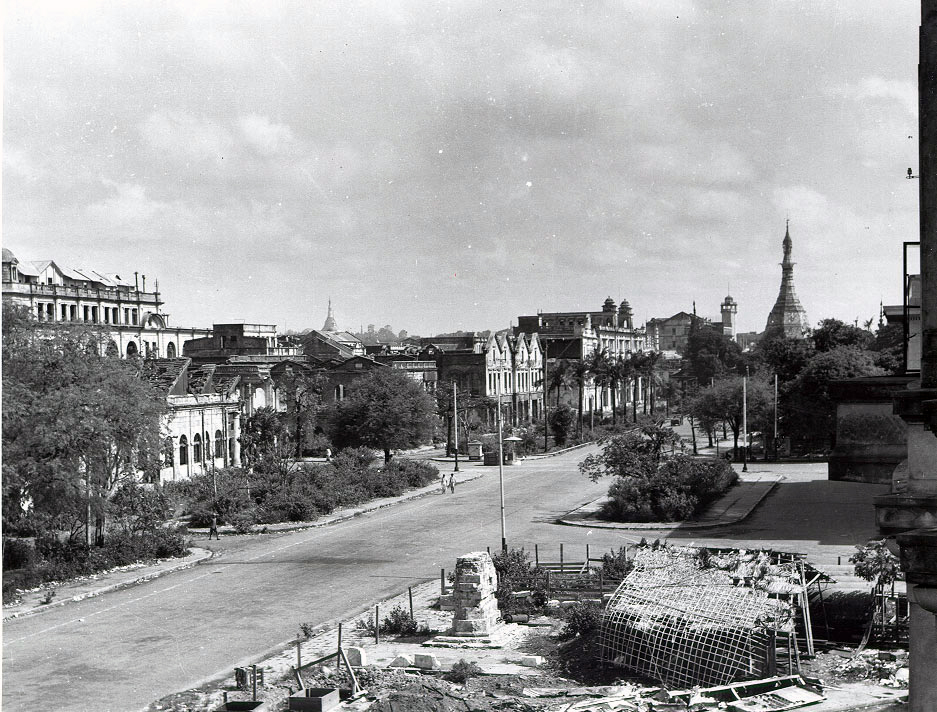
Damage of central Rangoon in the aftermath of World War II

The British captured Yangon and all of Lower Burma in the Second Anglo-Burmese War of 1852, and subsequently transformed Yangon into the commercial and political hub of British Burma. After the war, the British moved the capital of British Burma from Moulmein (present-day Mawlamyine) to Yangon. Based on the design by army engineer Lt. Alexander Fraser, the British constructed a new city on a grid plan on delta land, bounded to the east by the Pazundaung Creek and to the south and west by the Yangon River. Yangon became the capital of all British-ruled Burma after the British had captured Upper Burma in the Third Anglo-Burmese War of 1885. By the 1890s, Yangon's growing population and commerce gave birth to prosperous residential suburbs to the north of Royal Lake (Kandawgyi) and Inya Lake. The British also established hospitals including Rangoon General Hospital and colleges including Rangoon University.

After the Indian Rebellion of 1857, the British sent Bahadur Shah II, the last Mughal emperor, to Yangon to live in exile.

Colonial Yangon, with its spacious parks and lakes and mix of modern buildings and traditional wooden architecture, was known as "the garden city of the East". By the early 20th century, Yangon had public services and infrastructure on par with London.

Before World War II, about 55% of Yangon's population of 500,000 was Indian or South Asian, and only about a third was Bamar (Burman). Karens, Chinese, Anglo-Burmese, and others made up the rest.

After World War I, Yangon became the center of the Burmese independence movement, with leftist Rangoon University students leading the way. Three nationwide strikes against British rule in 1920, 1936, and 1938, led by April lin Htet all began in Yangon. Yangon was under Japanese occupation (1942–45), and incurred heavy damage during World War II. The city was retaken by the Allies in May 1945. Yangon became the capital of the Union of Burma on 4 January 1948 when the country gained independence from British rule.

=== Contemporary Yangon (1948–present) ===
Soon after Burma's independence in 1948, many colonial-era names of streets and parks were changed to more nationalistic Burmese names. In 1989, the military junta changed the city's English name to "Yangon", along with many other changes in English transliteration of Burmese names. (The changes have not been accepted by many Burmese who consider the junta unfit to make such changes, nor by many publications and news bureaus, including, most notably, the BBC and foreign nations including the United Kingdom and the United States.)

Since independence, Yangon has expanded outwards. Successive governments have built satellite towns such as Thaketa, North Okkalapa and South Okkalapa in the 1950s to Hlaingthaya, Shwepyitha and South Dagon in the 1980s. Today, Greater Yangon encompasses an area covering nearly 600 square kilometres (230 sq mi).

During Ne Win's isolationist rule (1962–88), Yangon's infrastructure deteriorated through poor maintenance and did not keep up with its growing population. In the 1990s, the military government's more open market policies attracted domestic and foreign investment, bringing a modicum of modernity to the city's infrastructure. Some inner city residents were forcibly relocated to new satellite towns. Many colonial-period buildings were demolished to make way for high-rise hotels, office buildings, and shopping malls, leading the city government to place about 200 notable colonial-period buildings under the Yangon City Heritage List in 1996. Major building programs resulted in six new bridges and five new highways linking the city to its industrial back country. Still, much of Yangon remains without basic municipal services such as 24-hour electricity and regular garbage collection.

Yangon has become much more indigenous Burmese in its ethnic makeup since independence. After independence, many South Asians and Anglo-Burmese left. Many more South Asians were forced to leave during the 1960s by Ne Win's xenophobic government. Nevertheless, sizeable South Asian and Chinese communities still exist in Yangon. The Anglo-Burmese have effectively disappeared, having left the country or intermarried with other Burmese groups.

Yangon was the centre of major anti-government protests in 1974, 1988 and 2007. In particular, the 8888 Uprising resulted in the deaths of hundreds, if not thousands, of Burmese civilians, many of them in Yangoon, where hundreds of thousands of people flooded into the streets of the former capital city. The Saffron Revolution saw mass shootings and the use of crematoria in Yangon by the Burmese government to erase evidence of their crimes against monks, unarmed protesters, journalists and students.

The city's streets saw bloodshed each time as protesters were gunned down by the government, most notably during the 1988, 2007, and 2021 mass protests, all of which were started in Yangon itself, signifying its importance as the cultural centre of Burma.

In May 2008, Cyclone Nargis hit Yangon. While the city had few human casualties, three-quarters of Yangon's industrial infrastructure was destroyed or damaged, with losses estimated at US$800 million.

In November 2005, the military government designated Naypyidaw, 320 kilometres (199 mi) north of Yangon, as the new administrative capital, and moved much of the government to the newly developed city. Yangon remains the largest city and the most important commercial, economic and cultural center of Myanmar. On 7 May 2005, a series of coordinated bombings occurred in the city of Yangon, Myanmar. Eleven people were killed in the attack, and one of the 162 people that were injured was a member of the LCMS mission team to Myanmar.

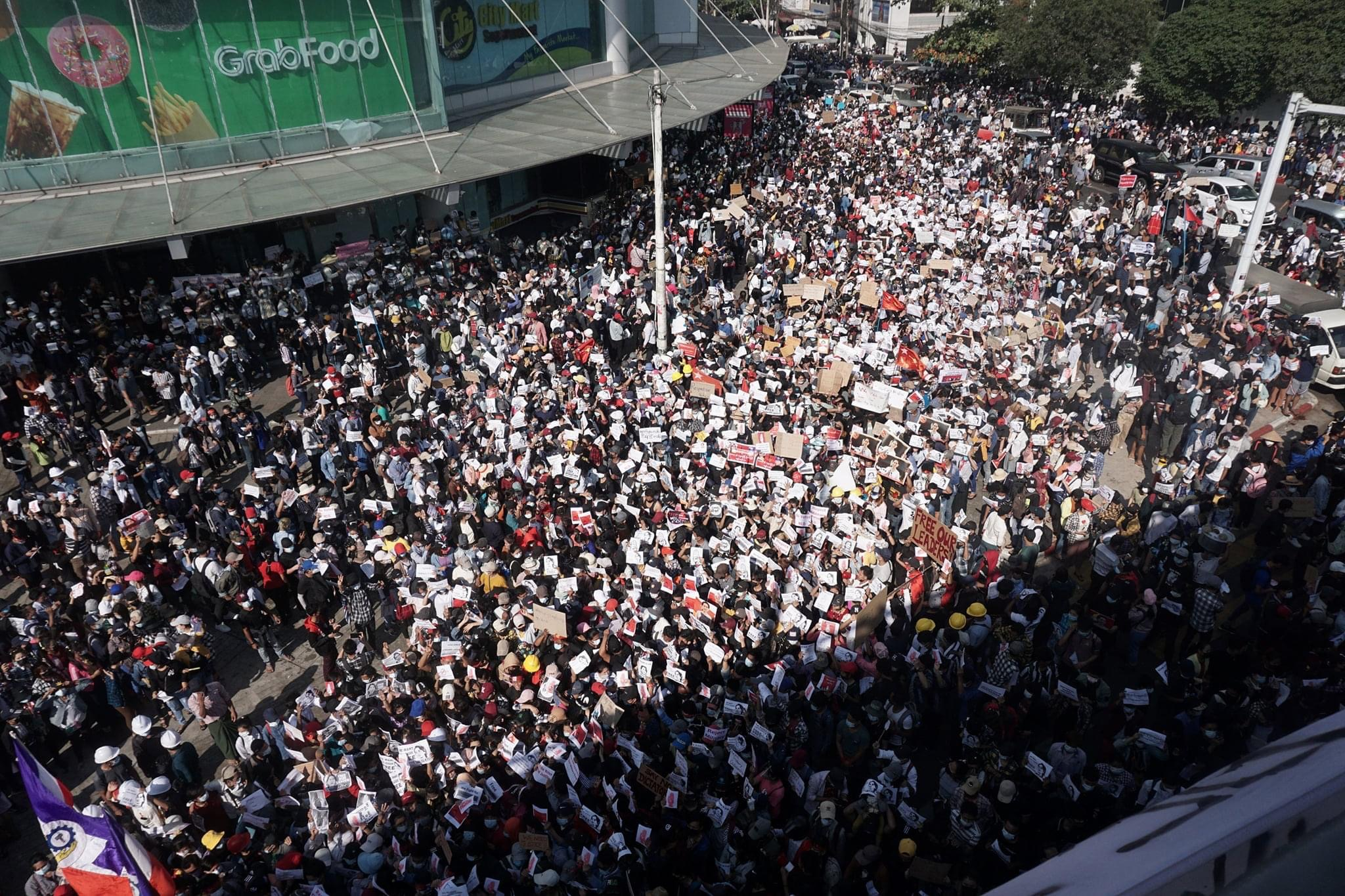
A protest in Yangon in response to the 2021 coup d'état.

In the 2020s, life in Yangon was greatly affected by the COVID-19 pandemic and 2021 coup d'état. The city was the location of mass protests in response to the coup. The pandemic and protests prompted the authorities to enforce a series of lockdowns and curfews. The city's economy subsequently slowed.

== Geography ==
Yangon is located in Lower Burma (Myanmar) at the convergence of the Yangon and Bago Rivers about 30 km (19 mi) away from the Gulf of Martaban at 16°48' North, 96°09' East (16.8, 96.15). Its standard time zone is UTC/GMT +6:30 hours. It is located 23 metres above sea level. Due to its location on the Irrawaddy Delta, intertidal flat ecosystems occur adjacent to the city.

=== Climate ===
Yangon has a tropical monsoon climate (Am) under the Köppen climate classification system. The city features a lengthy wet season from May through October where a substantial amount of rainfall is received; and a dry season from November through April, where little rainfall is seen. It is primarily due to the heavy rainfall received during the rainy season that makes Yangon fall under the tropical monsoon climate category. From 1961 to the 1990s, average temperatures show little variance, with average highs ranging from 29 to 36 °C (84 to 97 °F) and average lows ranging from 18 to 25 °C (64 to 77 °F).

Yangon is prone to tropical cyclones. In 2008, Cyclone Nargis made landfall as a Category 4 cyclone, making it the worst cyclone on record in the country.

Climate data for Yangon (Kaba–Aye) 1991–2020
Month	Jan	Feb	Mar	Apr	May	Jun	Jul	Aug	Sep	Oct	Nov	Dec	Year
Record high °C (°F)	39.0 (102.2)	39.8 (103.6)	40.4 (104.7)	42.2 (108.0)	42.0 (107.6)	40.0 (104.0)	37.8 (100.0)	37.2 (99.0)	38.9 (102.0)	38.0 (100.4)	38.9 (102.0)	35.6 (96.1)	42.2 (108.0)
Mean daily maximum °C (°F)	33.1 (91.6)	35.1 (95.2)	36.8 (98.2)	37.7 (99.9)	34.5 (94.1)	31.3 (88.3)	30.6 (87.1)	30.3 (86.5)	31.3 (88.3)	32.7 (90.9)	33.6 (92.5)	32.9 (91.2)	33.3 (91.9)
Daily mean °C (°F)	24.9 (76.8)	26.6 (79.9)	28.9 (84.0)	30.6 (87.1)	29.2 (84.6)	27.3 (81.1)	26.7 (80.1)	26.6 (79.9)	27.0 (80.6)	27.7 (81.9)	27.4 (81.3)	25.4 (77.7)	27.4 (81.3)
Mean daily minimum °C (°F)	16.6 (61.9)	18.1 (64.6)	20.9 (69.6)	23.5 (74.3)	24.0 (75.2)	23.2 (73.8)	22.8 (73.0)	22.8 (73.0)	22.8 (73.0)	22.7 (72.9)	21.1 (70.0)	17.9 (64.2)	21.4 (70.5)
Record low °C (°F)	10.0 (50.0)	12.8 (55.0)	15.0 (59.0)	16.0 (60.8)	17.5 (63.5)	18.4 (65.1)	18.5 (65.3)	16.0 (60.8)	17.0 (62.6)	13.5 (56.3)	12.4 (54.3)	9.2 (48.6)	9.2 (48.6)
Average precipitation mm (inches)	4.5 (0.18)	3.0 (0.12)	15.1 (0.59)	37.9 (1.49)	333.8 (13.14)	554.0 (21.81)	624.5 (24.59)	562.2 (22.13)	426.8 (16.80)	217.4 (8.56)	52.6 (2.07)	9.2 (0.36)	2,841 (111.85)
Average precipitation days (≥ 1.0 mm)	0.4	0.2	0.8	2.4	14.5	25.9	26.7	26.5	21.4	14.0	3.4	0.4	136.6
Average relative humidity (%)	62	66	69	66	73	85	86	87	85	78	71	65	74
Mean monthly sunshine hours	300	272	290	292	181	80	77	92	97	203	280	288	2,452
Source 1: World Meteorological Organization, Deutscher Wetterdienst (extremes)
Source 2: Danish Meteorological Institute (sun and relative humidity 1931–1960), Myanmar Times (May record high and December record low)

== Cityscape ==
Map of Yangon

Until the mid-1990s, Yangon remained largely constrained to its traditional peninsula setting between the Bago, Yangon, and Hlaing Rivers. People moved in, but little of the city moved out. Maps from 1944 show little development north of Inya Lake and areas that are now layered in cement and stacked with houses were then virtual backwaters. In the late 1980s, however, the city began a rapid spread north to where Yangon International Airport is located. But the result is a stretching tail on the city, with the downtown area well removed from its geographic centre. The city's area has steadily increased from 72.52 square kilometres (28.00 sq mi) in 1901 to 86.2 square kilometres (33.3 sq mi) in 1940 to 208.51 square kilometres (80.51 sq mi) in 1974, to 346.13 square kilometres (133.64 sq mi) in 1985, and to 598.75 square kilometres (231.18 sq mi) in 2008.

=== Architecture ===
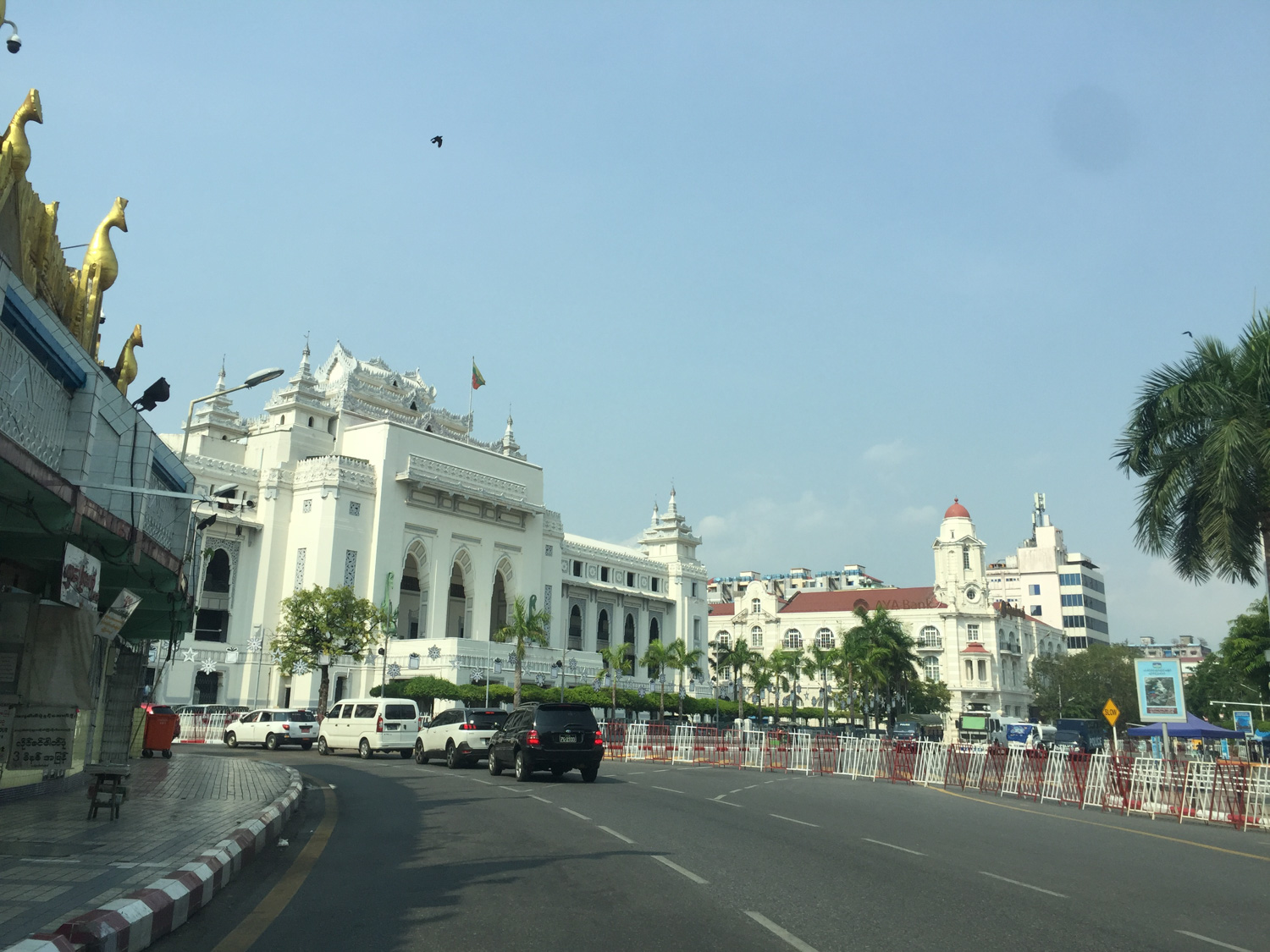
City Square in Downtown Yangon

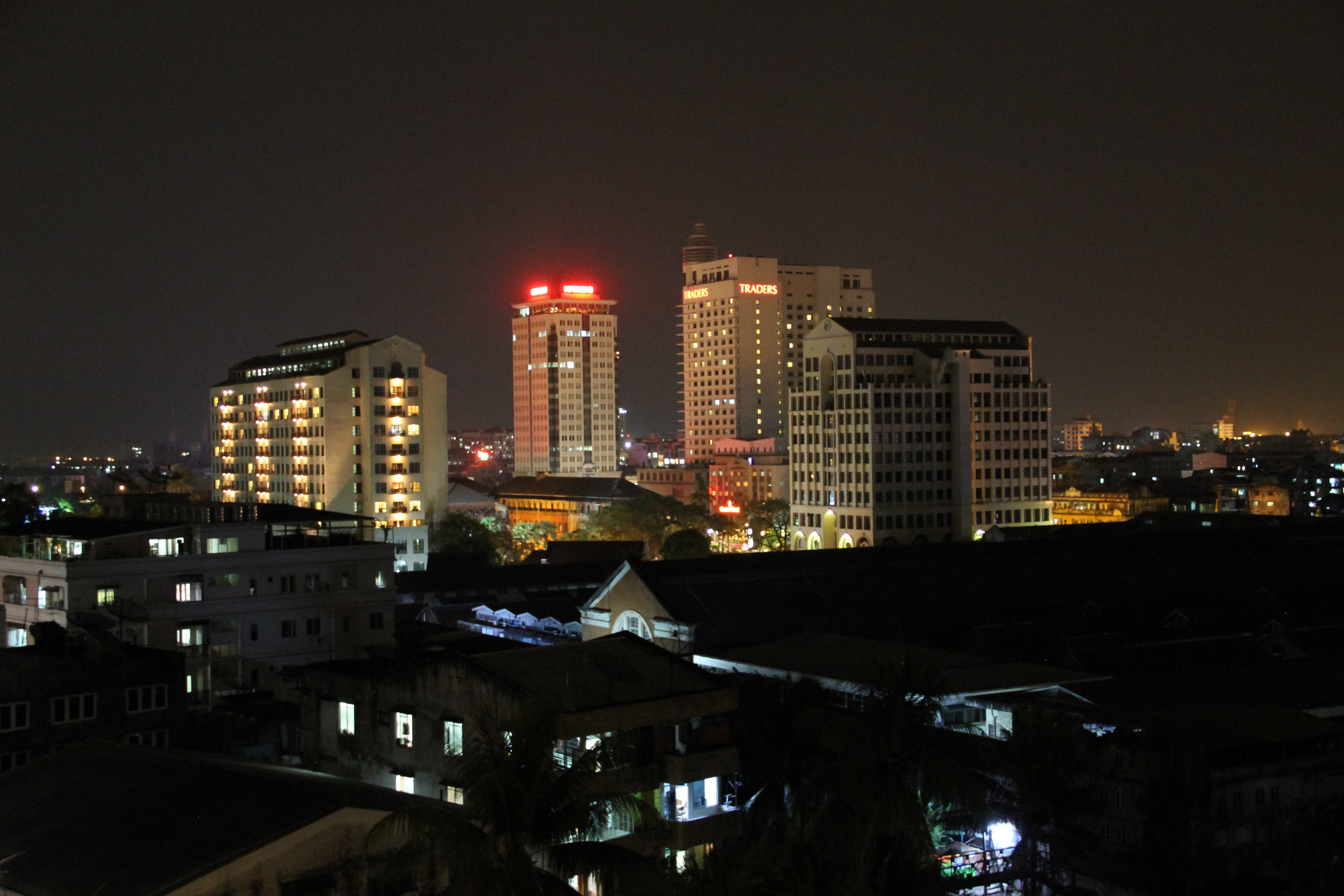
Yangon at night

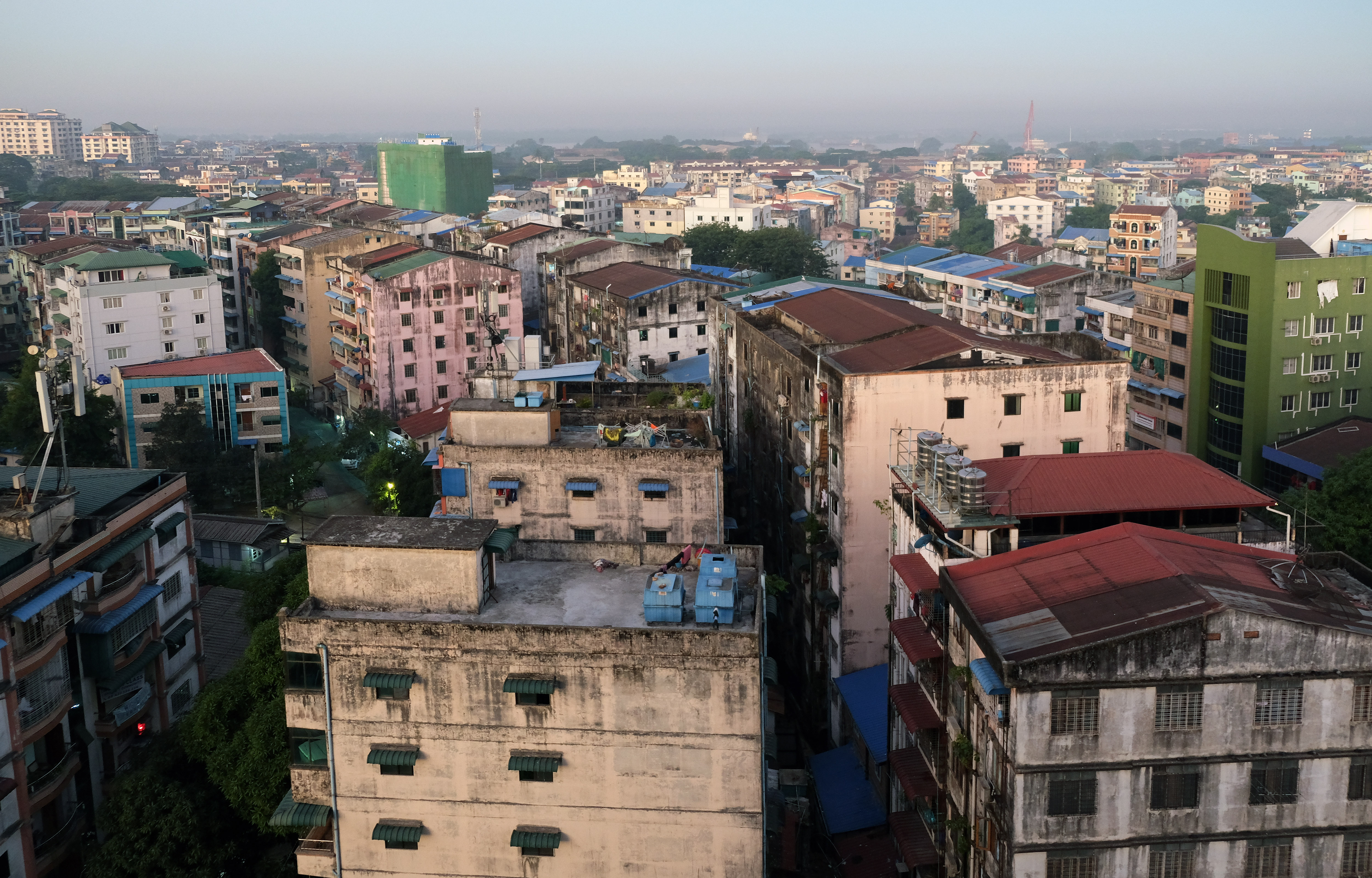
Yangon cityscape from Hledan

Downtown Yangon is known for its leafy avenues and fin-de-siècle architecture. The former British colonial capital has the highest number of colonial period buildings in south-east Asia. Downtown Yangon is still mainly made up of decaying colonial buildings. The former High Court, the former Secretariat buildings, the former St. Paul's English High School and the Strand Hotel are excellent examples of the bygone era. Most downtown buildings from this era are four-story mix-use (residential and commercial) buildings with 14-foot (4.3 m) ceilings, allowing for the construction of mezzanines. Despite their less-than-perfect conditions, the buildings remain highly sought after and most expensive in the city's property market.

In 1996, the Yangon City Development Committee created a Yangon City Heritage List of old buildings and structures in the city that cannot be modified or torn down without approval. In 2012, the city of Yangon imposed a 50-year moratorium on demolition of buildings older than 50 years. The Yangon Heritage Trust, an NGO started by Thant Myint-U, aims to create heritage areas in Downtown, and attract investors to renovate buildings for commercial use.

A latter-day hallmark of Yangon is the eight-story apartment building. (In Yangon parlance, a building with no elevators (lifts) is called an apartment building and one with elevators is called a condominium. Condos which have to invest in a local power generator to ensure 24-hour electricity for the elevators are beyond the reach of most Yangonites.) Found throughout the city, eight-story apartment buildings provide inexpensive housing for many Yangonites. The apartments are usually eight stories high (including the ground floor) mainly because city regulations, until February 2008, required that all buildings higher than 75 feet (23 m) or eight stories to install lifts. The code calls for elevators in buildings higher than 62 feet (19 m) or six stories, likely ushering in the era of the six-story apartment building. Although most apartment buildings were built only within the last 20 years, they look much older and rundown due to shoddy construction and lack of proper maintenance.

Unlike other major Asian cities, Yangon does not have any skyscrapers. This is due to rule that no building should be more than 75% the height above sea level of Shwedagon Pagoda, which rises about 160 metres (520 ft). For instance, in 2015, a luxury housing project was cancelled due to its proximity to Shwedagon Pagoda. Critics of the project claimed that the project could cause structural damage to the pagoda. Aside from a few high-rise hotels and office towers, most high-rise buildings (usually 10 stories and up) are "condos" scattered across prosperous neighbourhoods north of downtown such as Bahan, Dagon, Kamayut and Mayangon.

Older satellite towns such as Thaketa, North Okkalapa, and South Okkalapa are lined mostly with one to two-story detached houses with access to the city's electricity grid. Newer satellite towns such as North Dagon and South Dagon are in a grid layout. The satellite towns—old or new—receive little or no municipal services.

=== Road layout ===
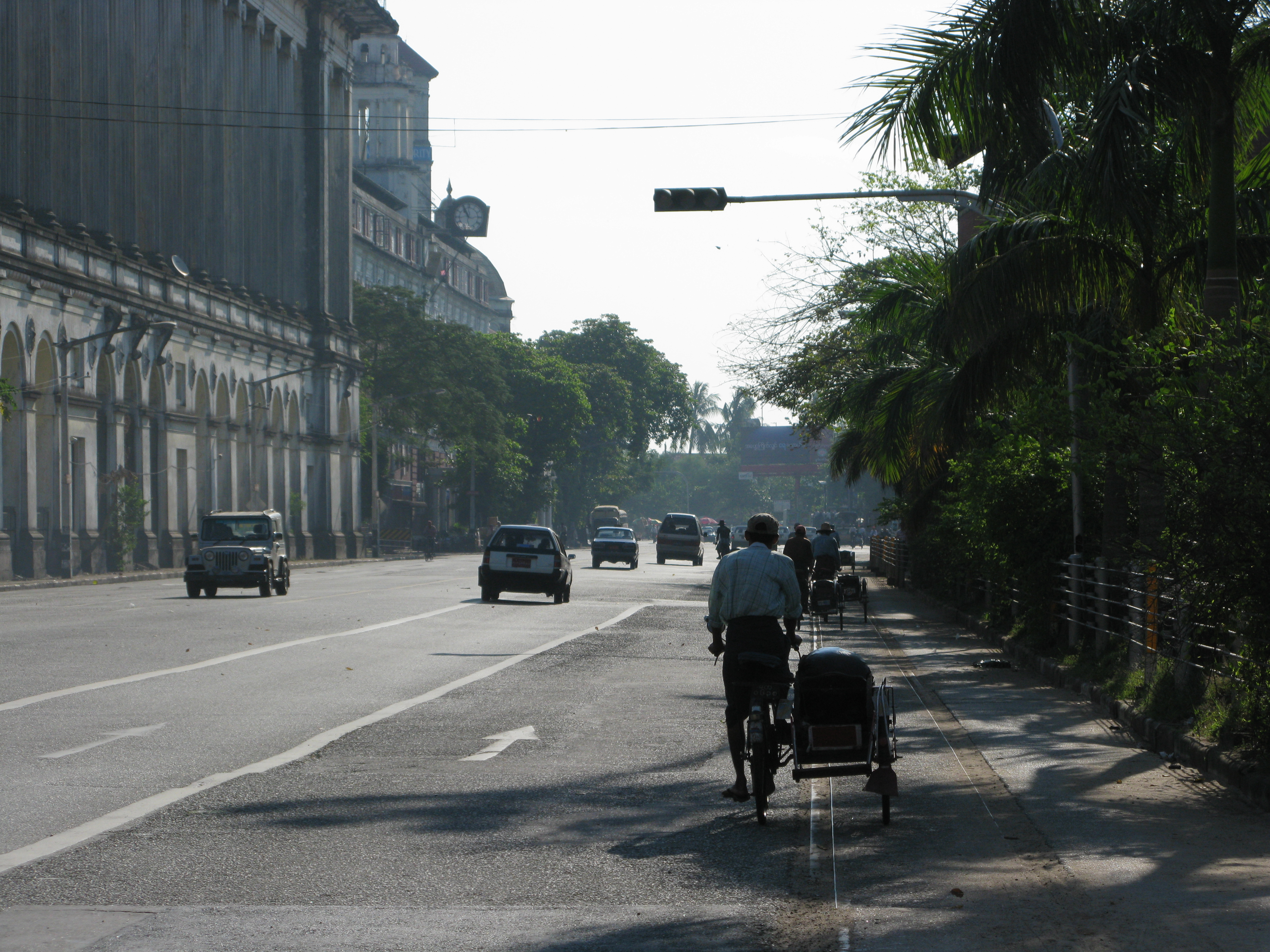
Strand Road, Yangon, 1 truck or bus, 7 cars and pickups, 1 (or two) individual cyclist(s), 6 (or 7) pedicab rickshaws

Downtown Yangon's road layout follows a grid pattern, based on four types of roads:

- Broad 49-m wide roads running west to east
- Broad 30-m wide roads running south to north
- Two narrow 9.1-m wide streets running south to north
- Mid-size 15-m wide streets running south to north

The east–west grid of central was laid out by British military engineers Fraser and Montgomerie after the Second Anglo-Burmese War. The city was later developed by the Public Works Department and Bengal Corps of Engineers. The pattern of south to north roads is as follows: one broad 100-foot (30 m) wide road, two narrow streets, one mid-size street, two more narrow streets, and then another broad 100-foot (30 m) wide road. This order is repeated from west to east. The narrow streets are numbered; the medium and broad roads are named.

For example, the 100-foot (30 m) Lanmadaw Road is followed by 30-foot (9.1 m)-wide 17th and 18th streets then the medium 50-foot (15 m) Sint-Oh-Dan Road, the 30-foot 19th and 20th streets, followed by another 100-foot (30 m) wide Latha Road, followed again by the two numbered small roads 21st and 22nd streets, and so on.

The roads running parallel west to east were the Strand Road, Merchant Road, Maha Bandula (née Dalhousie) Road, Anawrahta (Fraser) Road, and Bogyoke Aung San (Montgomerie) Road.

=== Parks and gardens ===
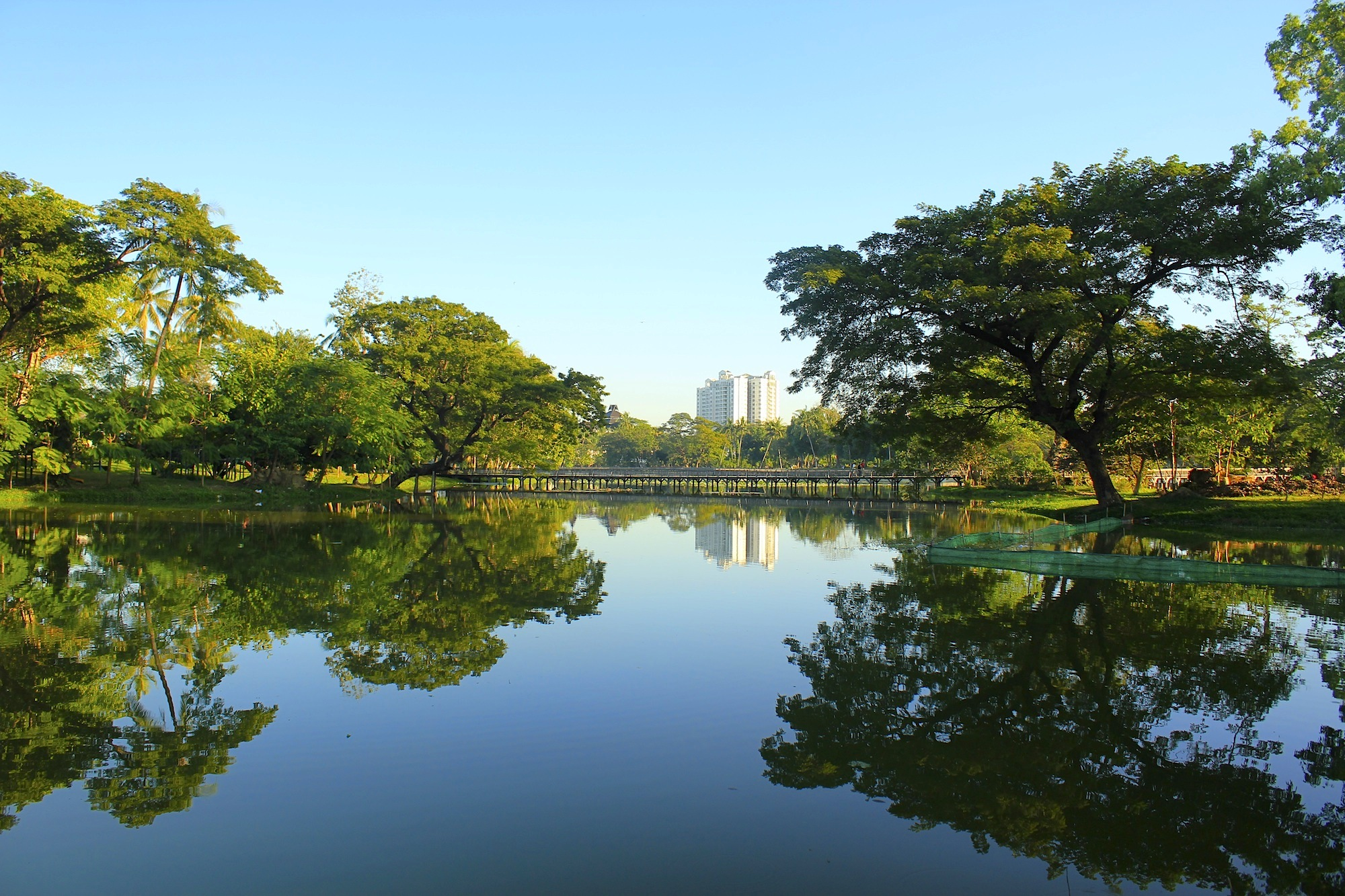
Kandawgyi Lake, a popular park near downtown Yangon

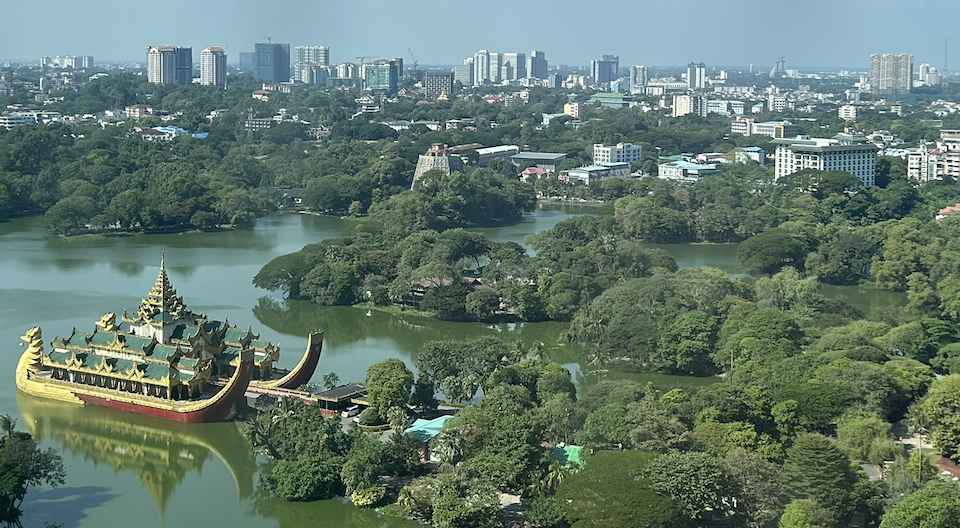
The skyline of Yangon in late November 2024

The largest and best maintained parks in Yangon are located around Shwedagon Pagoda. To the south-east of the gilded stupa is the most popular recreational area in the city – Kandawgyi Lake. The 150-acre (61-ha) lake is surrounded by the 110-acre (45-ha) Kandawgyi Nature Park, and the 69.25-acre (28-ha) Yangon Zoological Gardens, which consists of a zoo, an aquarium and an amusement park, and Bogyoke Aung San Park. West of the pagoda towards the former Hluttaw (Parliament) complex is the 130-acre (53-ha) People's Square and Park, the former parading ground on important national days when Yangon was the capital. A few miles north of the pagoda lies the 37-acre (15-ha) Inya Lake Park – a favourite hangout place of Yangon University students, and a well-known place of romance in Burmese popular culture.

Hlawga National Park and Allied War Memorial at the outskirts of the city are popular day-trip destinations with tourists.

=== Water supply ===
Yangon's water is supplied by four reservoirs managed by the YCDC: Hlawga, Gyobyu, Phugyi, and Ngamoeyeik Reservoirs, all of which are scattered throughout Yangon Region. Kandawgyi and Inya Lakes no longer function as reservoirs for the city.

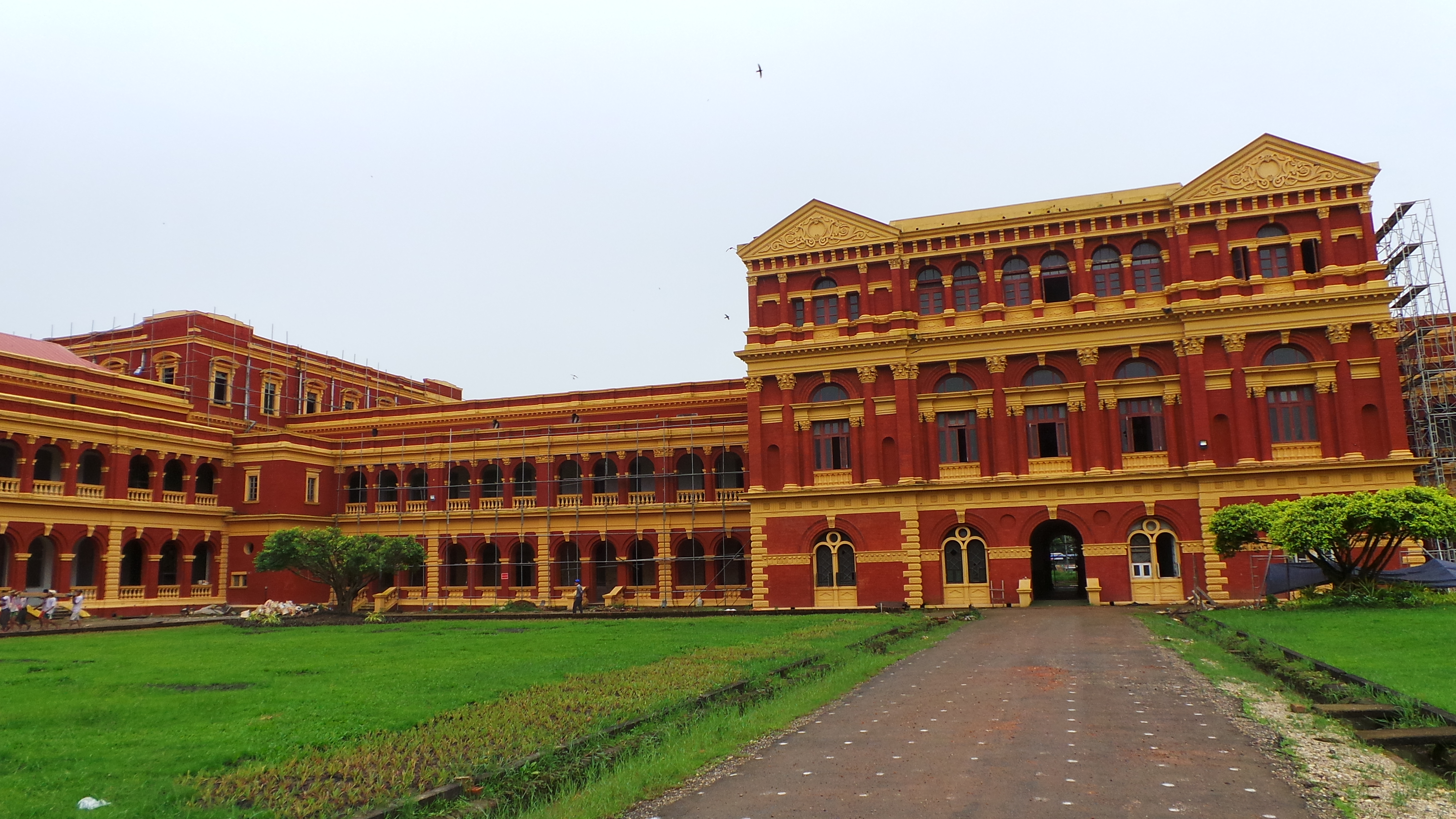
Yangon Secretariat Office

== Administration ==
Yangon is administered by the Yangon City Development Committee (YCDC). YCDC also coordinates urban planning. The city is made up of 33 townships and is part of Yangon Region. Yangon Region is divided into districts, which overlap with the city's jurisdiction. The current mayor of Yangon is Maung Maung Soe. Each township is administered by a Township Development Committee, alongside local leaders who make decisions regarding city beautification and infrastructure. Myo-thit (lit. "New Towns", or satellite towns) are not within such jurisdictions.

In 2022, the districts of Yangon Region were reorganised giving Yangon city nine newly formed districts, as well as parts of the newly formed Twante District.

Yangon city townships grouped by district, as of 2022

List of Yangon City Townships by District:

- Mingaladon District
  - Mingaladon Township
  - Shwepyitha Township
- Insein District
  - Insein Township
  - Hlaingthaya East Township
  - Hlaingthaya West Township
- Ahlon District
  - Ahlon Township
  - Kyimyindaing Township
  - Sanchaung Township
- Kamayut District
  - Bahan Township
  - Kamayut Township
- Mayangon District
  - Hlaing Township
  - Mayangon Township
  - North Okkalapa Township
- Thingangyun District
  - South Okkalapa Township
  - Tamwe Township
  - Thingangyun Township
  - Yankin Township
- Kyauktada District (Downtown)
  - Dagon Township
  - Kyauktada Township
  - Lanmadaw Township
  - Latha Township
  - Pabedan Township
  - Seikkan Township
- Botataung District (Downtown)
  - Botataung Township
  - Dawbon Township
  - Mingala Taungnyunt Township
  - Pazundaung Township
  - Thaketa Township
- Dagon Myothit District
  - Dagon Seikkan Township
  - North Dagon Township
  - South Dagon Township
  - East Dagon Township
- Twante District
  - Seikkyi Kanaungto Township
  - Parts of Dala Township

Yangon is a member of the Asian Network of Major Cities 21.

== Transport ==
Yangon is Myanmar's main domestic and international hub for air, rail, and ground transportation.

=== Air ===
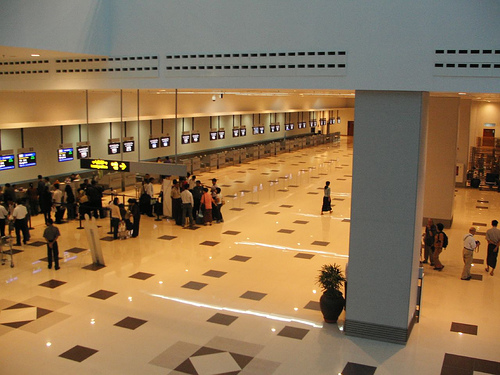
Inside T2, Yangon International Airport

Yangon International Airport, located 12 miles (19 km) from downtown, is the country's main gateway for domestic and international air travel. The airport has three terminals, known as T1, T2 and T3 which is also known as Domestic. It has direct flights to major cities in Asia, such as Tokyo, Shanghai, Seoul, Singapore, Hong Kong, Kuala Lumpur, Kolkata, and Dubai. Although domestic airlines offer service to about forty domestic locations, most flights are to tourist destinations such as Bagan, Mandalay, Heho and Ngapali, and to the capital Naypyidaw.

=== Railways ===
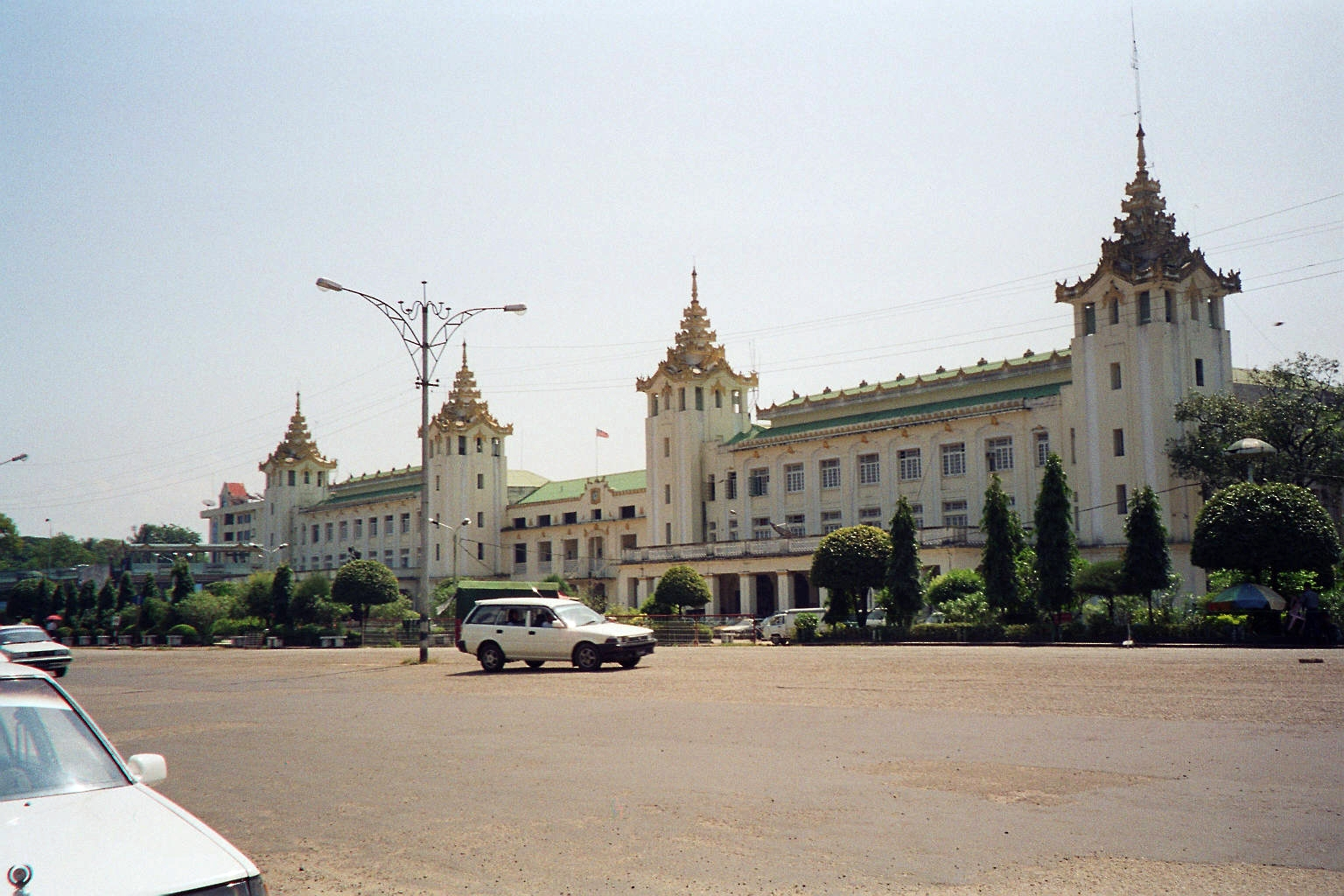
Yangon Central Railway Station

Yangon Central Railway Station is the main terminus of Myanmar Railways' 5,403-kilometre (3,357 mi) rail network whose reach covers Upper Myanmar (Naypyidaw, Mandalay, Shwebo), upcountry (Myitkyina), Shan hills (Taunggyi, Lashio) and the Taninthayi coast (Mawlamyine, Dawei).

Yangon Circular Railway operates a 45.9-kilometre (28.5 mi) 39-station commuter rail network that connects Yangon's satellite towns. The system is heavily used by the local populace, selling about 150,000 tickets daily. The popularity of the commuter line has jumped since the government reduced petrol subsidies in August 2007.

In 2017 the government of Japan provided more than US$200 million in finance to assist with a range of works including developing and maintaining the Yangon circular railway line, purchasing new carriages and upgrading signalling.

=== Rapid transit ===
The Yangon Urban Mass Rapid Transit is a proposed rapid transit system, due to begin construction in 2022 and be complete by 2027.

=== Buses and cars ===
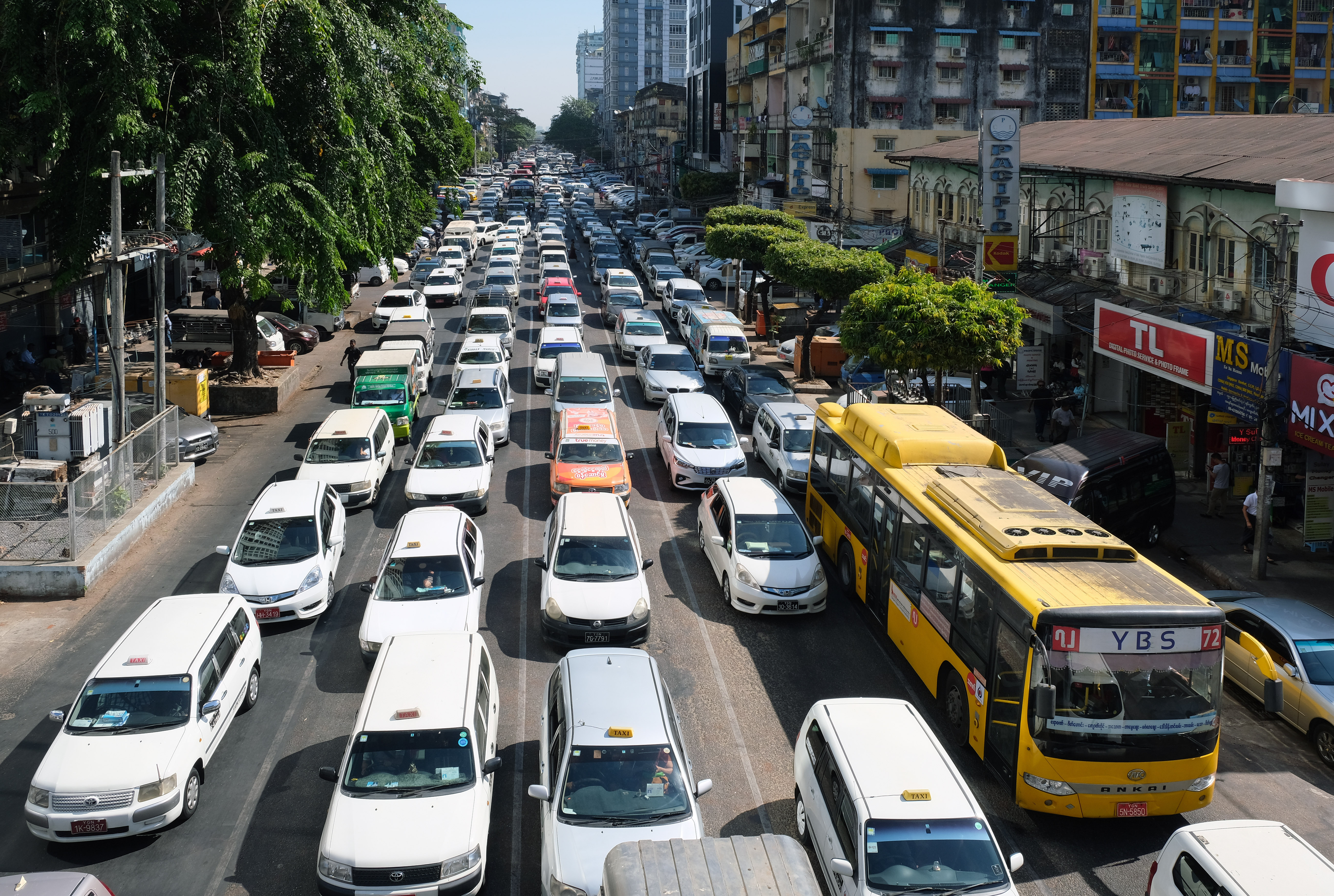
Traffic on Anawrahta Road, named after the founder of the Pagan Empire

Yangon has a 6,000-kilometre (3,700 mi) road network of all types (tar, concrete and dirt) in March 2020. Many of the roads are in poor condition and not wide enough to accommodate an increasing number of cars. The vast majority of Yangon residents cannot afford a car and rely on an extensive network of buses to get around. Over 300 public and private bus lines operate about 6,300 crowded buses around the city, carrying over 4.4 million passengers a day. All buses and 80% of the taxis in Yangon run on compressed natural gas (CNG), following the 2005 government decree to save money on imported petroleum. Highway buses to other cities depart from Dagon Ayeyar Highway Bus Terminal for Irrawaddy delta region and Aung Mingala Highway Bus Terminal for other parts of the country.

Motor transportation in Yangon is highly expensive for most of its citizens. As the government allows only a few thousand cars to be imported each year in a country with over 50 million people, car prices in Yangon (and in Burma) are among the highest in the world. In July 2008, the two most popular cars in Yangon, 1986/87 Nissan Sunny Super Saloon and 1988 Toyota Corolla SE Limited, cost the equivalent of about US$20,000 and US$29,000 respectively. A sports utility vehicle, imported for the equivalent of around US$50,000, goes for US$250,000. Illegally imported unregistered cars are cheaper – typically about half the price of registered cars. Nonetheless, car usage in Yangon is on the rise, a sign of rising incomes for some, and already causes much traffic congestion in highway-less Yangon's streets. In 2011, Yangon had about 300,000 registered motor vehicles in addition to an unknown number of unregistered ones.

A (rare) cyclist in Kyauktada District

Within Yangon city limits, it has been illegal to drive motorcycles, since 2003. Human-powered bicyles are rare, but obviously allowed. Since February 2010, pick-up truck bus lines have been forbidden to run in six townships of central Yangon, namely Latha, Lanmadaw, Pabedan, Kyauktada, Botahtaung and Pazundaung Townships. In May 2003, a ban on using car horns was implemented in six townships of Downtown Yangon to reduce noise pollution. In April 2004, the car horn ban was expanded to cover the entire city.

On 16 January 2017, as part of public transport reforms, city bus network system Yangon Bus Service (YBS) was created by the Yangon Region Transport Authority. On 20 May 2021, YRTA was reorganised as Yangon Region Transport Committee (YRTC). YBS is claimed to be a disabled-friendly bus service and have a card payment system. Since January 2019, passengers can either pay with cash or smart cards through the machines installed near the driver seat on the bus. As of January 2022, it is claimed that card machines are installed on more than 1900 buses. Ride hailing services operated by private corporations such as Uber and Grab are also available in Yangon today.

=== River ===
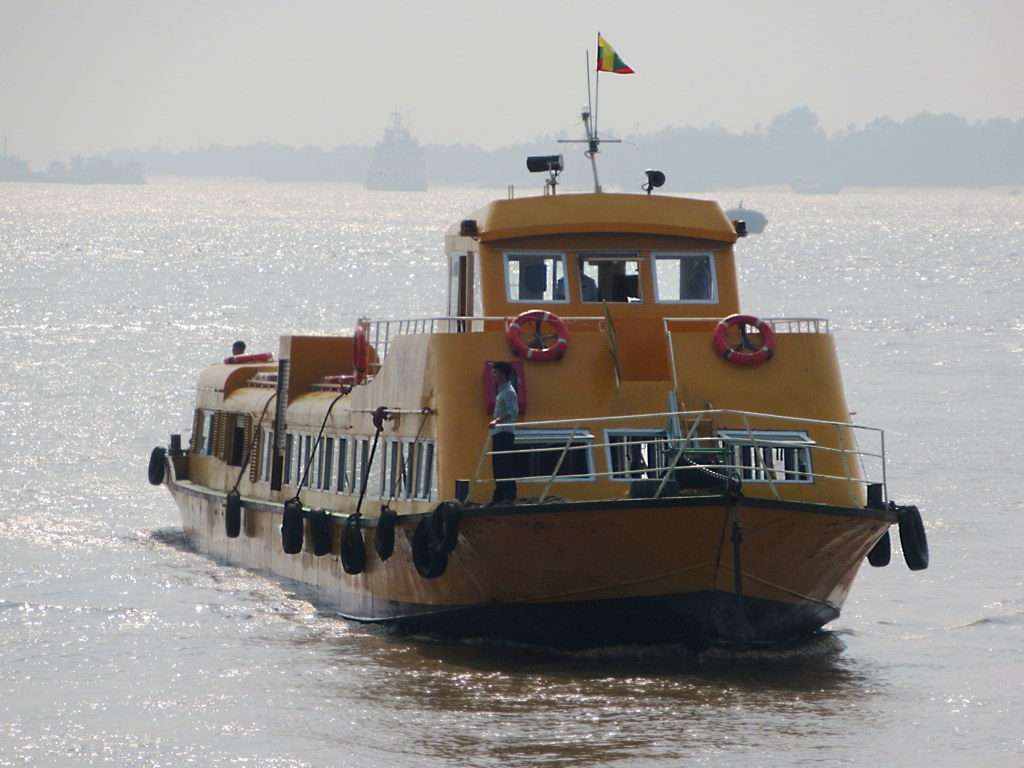
Yangon Water Bus plies the Yangon (Hlaing) River between Botahtaung and Insein every hour throughout the day

Yangon's four main passenger jetties, all located on or near downtown waterfront, mainly serve local ferries across the river to Dala and Thanlyin, and regional ferries to the Irrawaddy delta. The 22-mile (35 km) Twante Canal was the quickest route from Yangon to the Irrawaddy delta until the 1990s when roads between Yangon and the Irrawaddy Division became usable year-round. While passenger ferries to the delta are still used, those to Upper Burma via the Irrawaddy river are now limited mostly to tourist river cruises. In October 2017, a New Yangon Water Bus was launched.

== Demographics ==
Historical population
Year	Pop.	±%
1824	10,000	—
1856	46,000	+360.0%
1872	100,000	+117.4%
1881	165,000	+65.0%
1891	181,000	+9.7%
1901	248,000	+37.0%
1911	295,000	+19.0%
1921	340,000	+15.3%
1931	400,000	+17.6%
1941	500,000	+25.0%
1950	1,302,000	+160.4%
1960	1,592,000	+22.3%
1970	1,946,000	+22.2%
1980	2,378,000	+22.2%
1990	2,907,000	+22.2%
2000	3,553,000	+22.2%
2010	5,348,000	+50.5%
Sources: 1846, 1872–1941, 1950–2025

Yangon is the most populous city by far in Myanmar. According to the 2014 census, the city had a population of 5.16 million. The city's population grew sharply after 1948 as many people (mainly, the indigenous Burmese) from other parts of the country moved into the newly built satellite towns of North Okkalapa, South Okkalapa, and Thaketa in the 1950s and East Dagon, North Dagon and South Dagon in the 1990s. Immigrants have founded their regional associations (such as Mandalay Association, Mawlamyaing Association, etc.) in Yangon for networking purposes. The government's decision to move the nation's administrative capital to Naypyidaw has drained an unknown number of civil servants away from Yangon.

Yangon is the most ethnically diverse city in the country. While Indians formed the slight majority prior to World War II, today, the majority of the population is of indigenous Bamar (Burman) descent. Large communities of Indians Burmese and the Chinese Burmese are present, especially in the traditional downtown neighbourhoods. A large number of Rakhine and Karen people also live in the city.

Burmese is the principal language of the city. English is by far the preferred second language of the educated class. In recent years, however, the prospect of overseas job opportunities has enticed some to study other languages: Mandarin Chinese is most popular, followed by Japanese, and French.

=== Religion ===
The primary religions practised in Yangon are Buddhism, Christianity, Islam, and Hinduism. Shwedagon Pagoda is a famous religious landmark in the city.

=== Media ===
Yangon is the country's hub for the movie, music, advertising, newspaper, and book publishing industries, and is the country's cultural center. All media is heavily regulated by the military government. Television broadcasting is off-limits to the private sector. All media content must first be approved by the government's media censor board, Press Scrutiny and Registration Division.

Most television channels in the country are broadcast from Yangon. MRTV and Myawaddy TV are the two main channels, providing Burmese-language news and entertainment programs. Other special interest channels are MWD-1 and MWD-2, MITV, the English-language channel that targets overseas audiences via satellite and via internet, MRTV-4 and Channel 7 (Yangon), which has a focus on non-formal education programs and movies, and Movie 5, a pay-TV channel specialising in broadcasting foreign movies.

Yangon has three radio stations. Myanmar Radio is the national radio service and broadcasts mostly in Burmese and in English during specific times. Pop culture-oriented Yangon City FM and Mandalay City FM radio stations specialise in Burmese and English pop music, entertainment programs, live celebrity interviews, etc. New radio channels such as Shwe FM and Pyinsawaddy FM can also be tuned with the city area.

Nearly all print media and industries are based in Yangon. All three national newspapers – two Burmese language dailies Myanma Alin (မြန်မာ့အလင်း) and Kyemon (ကြေးမုံ), and the English language The New Light of Myanmar – are published by the government. Semi-governmental The Myanmar Times weekly, published in Burmese and in English, is mainly geared for Yangon's expatriate community. There are over 20 special interest journals and magazines covering sports, fashion, finance, crime, and literature (but never politics).

Access to foreign media is extremely difficult. Satellite television in Yangon, and in Burma, is very expensive as the government imposes an annual registration fee of Ks.10,00,000/-, equivalent to around U$600/year. Certain foreign newspapers and periodicals such as the Straits Times can be found only in a few (mostly downtown) bookstores. Internet access in Yangon, which has the best telecommunication infrastructure in the country, is slow and erratic at best, and the Burmese government implements one of the world's most restrictive regimes of internet control. International text messaging and voice messaging was permitted only in August 2008.

=== Communication ===
Common facilities taken for granted elsewhere are luxury prized items in Yangon and Burma. The price of a GSM mobile phone was about K1.1 million in August 2008. In 2007, the country of 55 million had only 775,000 phone lines (including 275,000 mobile phones), and 400,000 computers. Even in Yangon, which has the best infrastructure, the estimated telephone penetration rate was only 6% at the end of 2004, and the official waiting time for a telephone line was 3.6 years. Most people cannot afford a computer and have to use the city's numerous Internet cafes to access a heavily restricted internet, and a heavily censored local intranet. According to official statistics, in July 2010, the country had over 400,000 internet users, with the vast majority hailing from just two cities, Yangon and Mandalay. Although internet access was available in 42 cities across the country, the number of users outside the two main cities was just over 10,000.

=== Lifestyle ===
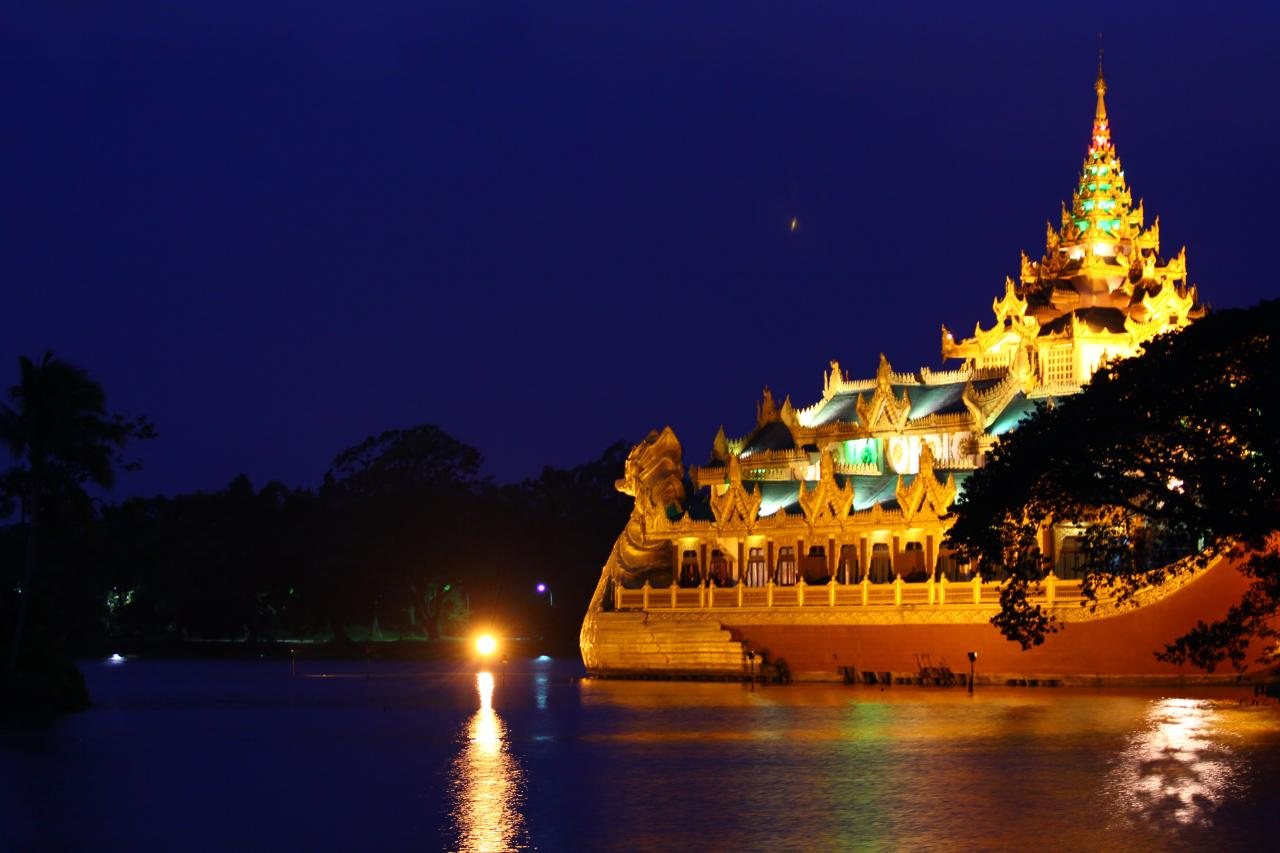
The Karaweik at night time, at Kandawgyi Lake, which is one of a few major recreational parks in Yangon

Yangon's property market is the most expensive in the country and beyond the reach of most Yangonites. Most rent outside the centre and few can afford to rent such apartments. (In 2008, rents for a typical 650-to-750-square-foot (60 to 70 m^{2}) apartments in the centre and vicinity range between K70,000 and K150,000 and those for high end condos between K200,000 and K500,000.)

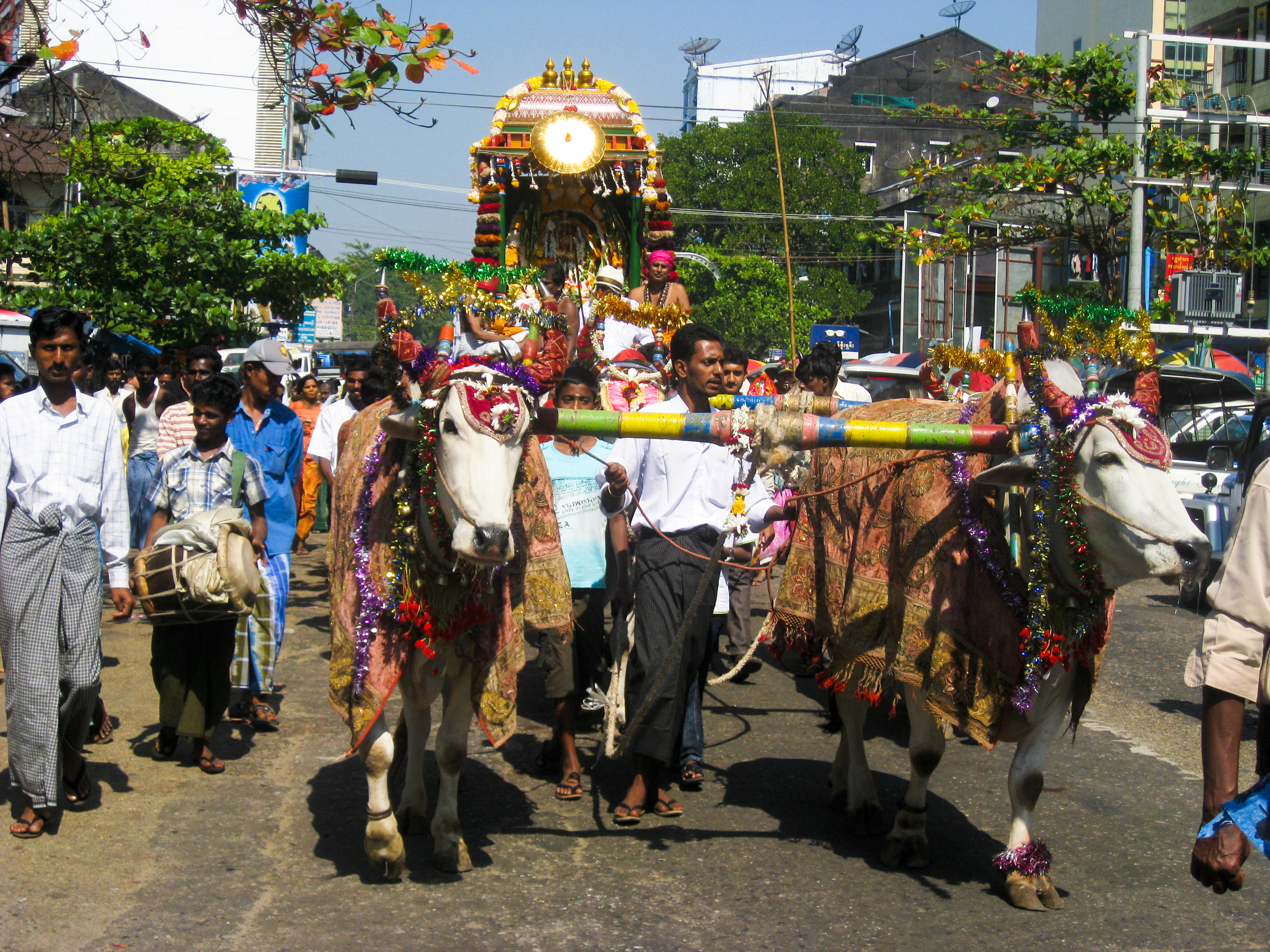
Hindu temple procession cart

Yangon is home to pagoda festivals (paya pwe), held during dry-season months (November – March). The most famous of all, the Shwedagon Pagoda Festival in March, attracts thousands of pilgrims from around the country.

Yangon's museums are the domain of tourists and rarely visited by the locals.

Most of Yangon's larger hotels offer nightlife entertainment, geared towards tourists and the well-to-do Burmese. Some hotels offer traditional Burmese performing arts shows complete with a traditional Burmese orchestra.

== Sports ==
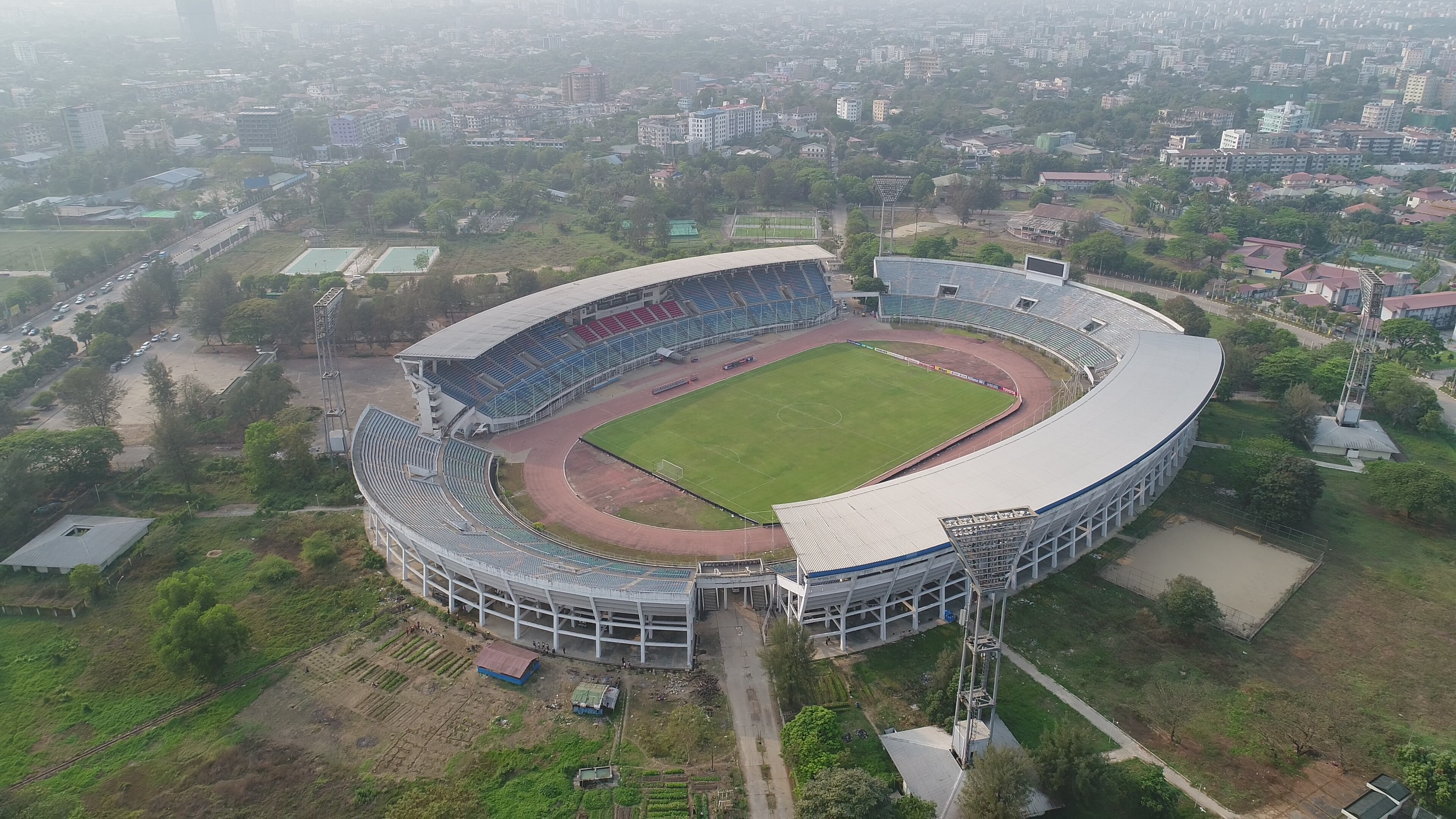
Thuwunna Stadium

As the city has the best sporting facilities in the country, most national-level annual sporting tournaments such as track and field, football, volleyball, tennis and swimming are held in Yangon. The 40,000-seat Aung San Stadium and the 32,000-seat Thuwunna Stadium are the main venues for the popular annual State and Division football tournament. Until April 2009, the now-defunct Myanmar Premier League, consisted of 16 Yangon-based clubs, played all its matches in Yangon stadiums, and attracted little interest from the general public or commercial success despite the enormous popularity of football in Burma. Most Yangonites prefer watching European football on satellite TV. Teams such as Manchester United, Liverpool, Chelsea, Real Madrid, Barcelona, Bayern Munich, and Manchester City are among the favourite European teams among the Yangonites. It remains to be seen whether the Myanmar National League, the country's first professional football league, and its Yangon-based club Yangon United FC will attract a sufficient following in the country's most important media market.

Yangon is also home to the annual Myanmar Open golf tournament, and the Myanmar Open tennis tournament. The city hosted the 1961 and 1969 South East Asian Games. During colonial times, cricket was played mostly by British officials in the city. First-class cricket was played in the city in January 1927 when the touring Marylebone Cricket Club played Burma and the Rangoon Gymkhana. Two grounds were used to host these matches, the BAA Ground and the Gymkhana Ground. These matches mark the only time Burma and Rangoon Gymkhana have appeared in first-class cricket, and the only time first-class cricket has been played in Burma. After independence cricket all but died out in the country.

Yangon has a growing population of skateboarders, as documented in the films Altered Focus: Burma and Youth of Yangon. German non-profit organization Make Life Skate Life has received permission from the Yangon City Development Committee to construct a concrete skatepark at Thakin Mya park in downtown. The park was completed in 2015 and is available free of charge to anyone in the city.

== Economy ==
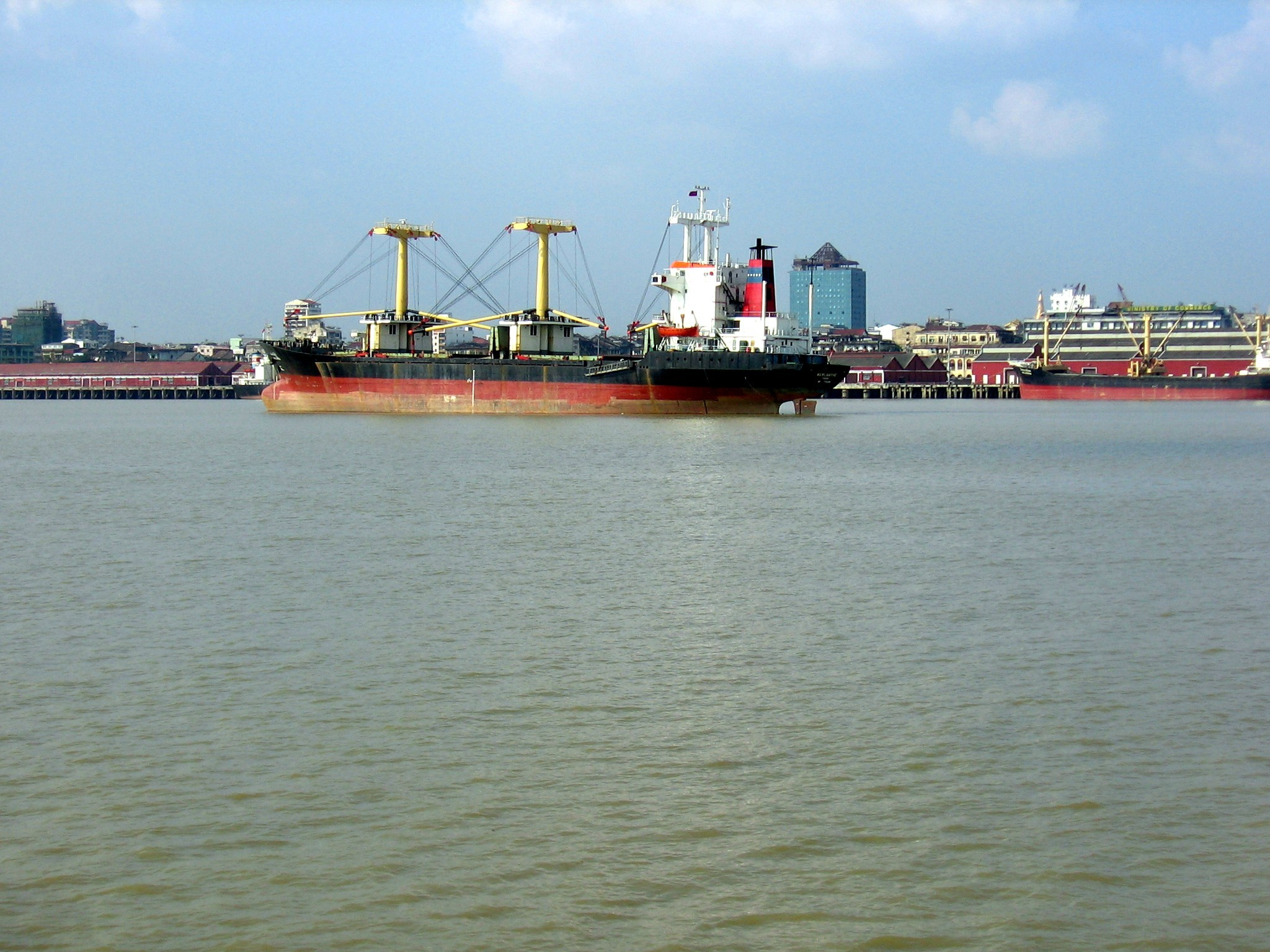
Cargo ships on the shores of Yangon River, just offshore of Downtown Yangon

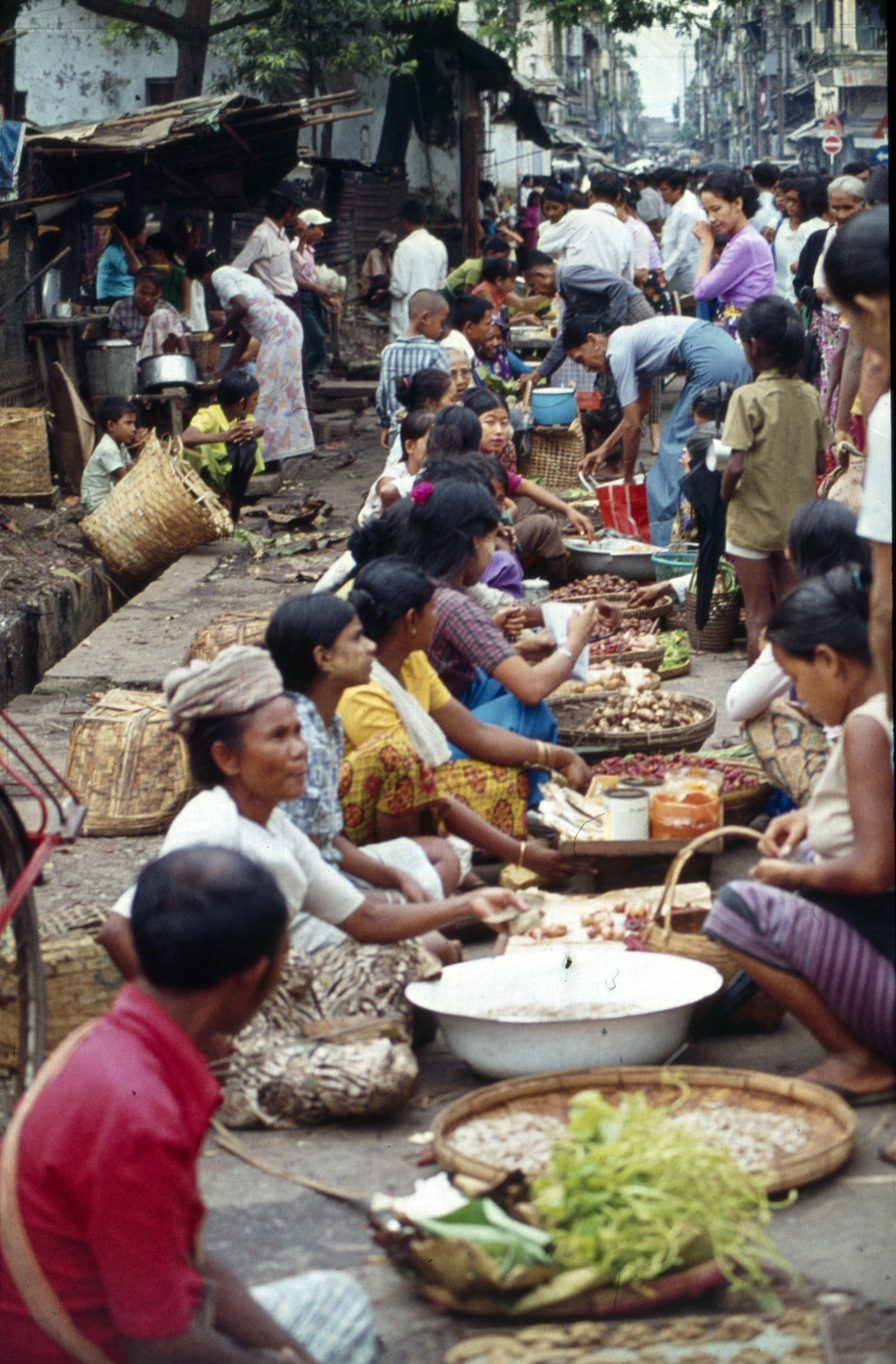
A street market in 1976

Yangon is the country's main center for trade, industry, real estate, media, entertainment and tourism. The city represents about one fifth of the national economy. According to official statistics for FY 2010–2011, the size of the economy of Yangon Region was 8.93 trillion kyats, or 23% of the national GDP.

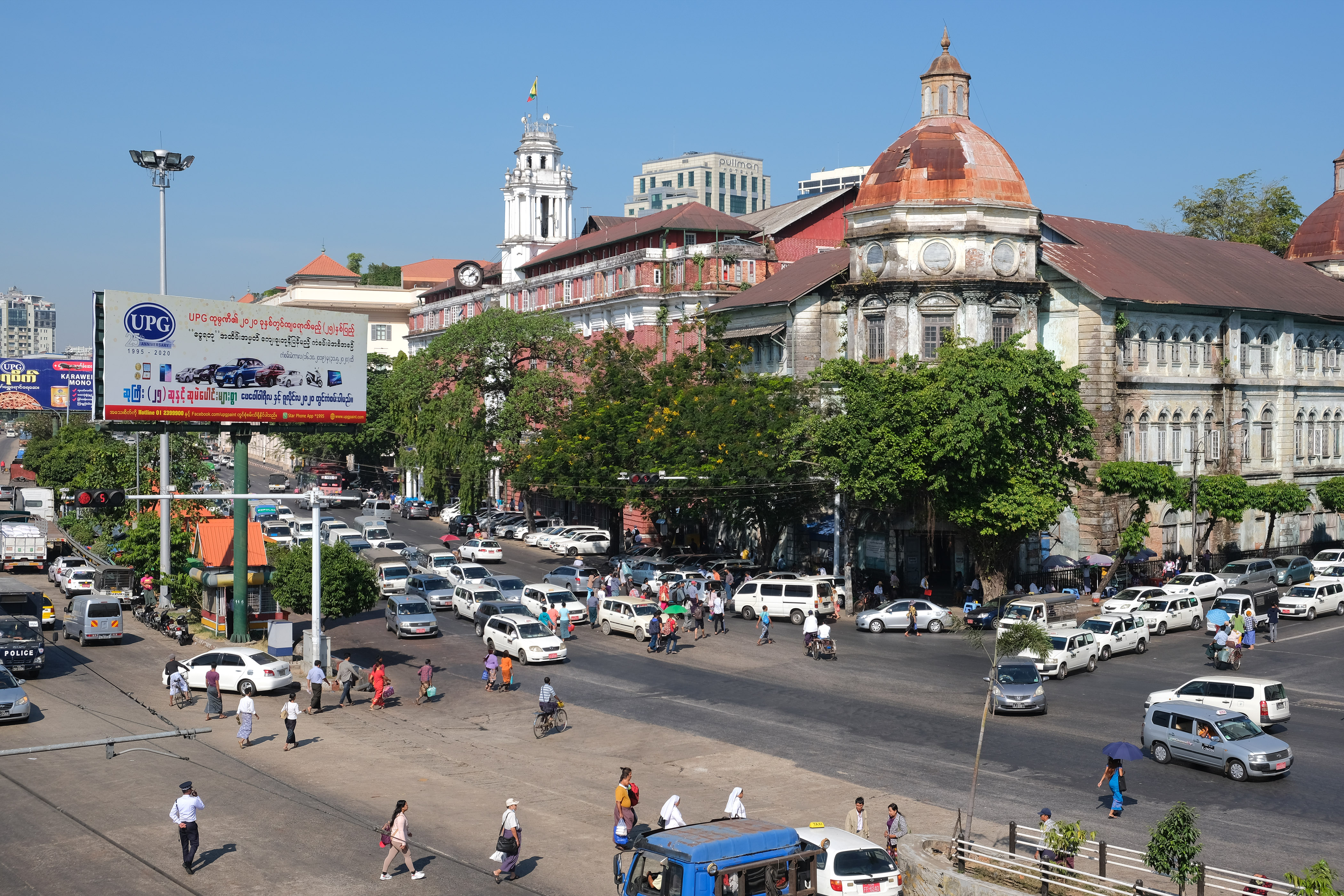
Traffic in Yangon: horizontal traffic lights, three individual cyclists, at least five rickshaws, in front the electric overhead supply of Yangon Tram

The city is Lower Burma's main trading hub for all kinds of merchandise – from basic foodstuffs to used cars although commerce continues to be hampered by the city's severely underdeveloped banking industry and communication infrastructure. Bayinnaung Market is the largest wholesale center in the country for rice, beans and pulses, and other agricultural commodities. Much of the country's legal imports and exports go through Thilawa Port, the largest and busiest port in Burma. There is also a great deal of informal trade, especially in street markets that exist alongside street platforms of Downtown Yangon's townships. However, on 17 June 2011, the YCDC announced that street vendors, who had previously been allowed to legally open shop at 3 pm, would be prohibited from selling on the streets, and permitted to sell only in their townships of residence. Since 1 December 2009, high-density polyethylene plastic bags have been banned by city authorities.

Manufacturing accounts for a sizeable share of employment. At least 14 light industrial zones ring Yangon, directly employing over 150,000 workers in 4,300 factories in early 2010. The city is the centre of country's garment industry which exported US$292 million in 2008/9 fiscal year. More than 80 percent of factory workers in Yangon work on a day-to-day basis. Most are young women between 15 and 27 years of age who come from the countryside in search of a better life. The manufacturing sector suffers from both structural problems (e.g. chronic power shortages) and political problems (e.g. economic sanctions). In 2008, Yangon's 2500 factories alone needed about 120 MW of power; yet, the entire city received only about 250 MW of the 530 MW needed. Chronic power shortages limit the factories' operating hours between 8 am and 6 pm.

Construction is a major source of employment. The construction industry has been negatively affected by the move of state apparatus and civil servants to Naypyidaw, new regulations introduced in August 2009 requiring builders to provide at least 12 parking spaces in every new high-rise building, and the general poor business climate. As of January 2010, the number of new high-rise building starts approved in 2009–2010 was only 334, compared to 582 in 2008–2009.

Tourism represents a major source of foreign currency for the city although by south-east Asian standards the number of foreign visitors to Yangon has always been quite low—about 250,000 before the Saffron Revolution in September 2007. The number of visitors dipped even further following the Saffron Revolution and Cyclone Nargis. The recent improvement in the country's political climate has attracted an increasing number of businessmen and tourists. Between 300,000 and 400,000 visitors that went through Yangon International in 2011. However, after years of underinvestment, Yangon's modest hotel infrastructure—only 3000 of the total 8000 hotel rooms in Yangon are "suitable for tourists"—is already bursting at seams, and will need to be expanded to handle additional visitors. As part of an urban development strategy, a hotel zone has been planned in Yangon's outskirts, encompassing government- and military-owned land in Mingaladon, Hlegu and Htaukkyant Townships.

== Education ==
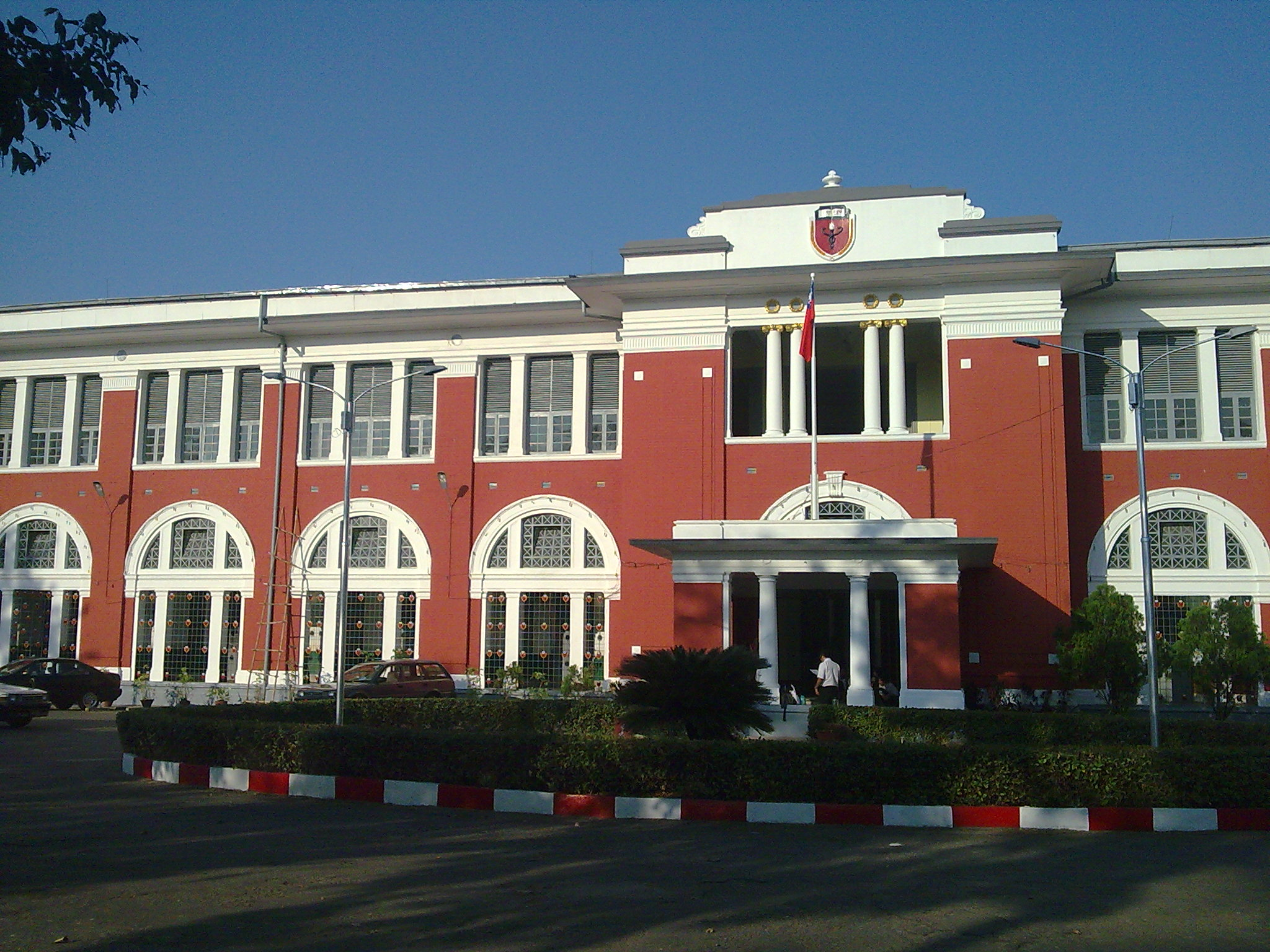
University of Medicine 1

Yangon educational facilities have a very high number of qualified teachers but the state spending on education is among the lowest of the world. Around 2007 estimate by the London-based International Institute for Strategic Studies puts the spending for education at 0.5% of the national budget. The disparity in educational opportunities and achievement between rich and poor schools is quite stark even within the city. With little or no state support forthcoming, schools have to rely on forced "donations" and fees from parents for nearly everything – school maintenance to teachers' salaries, forcing many poor students to drop out.

While many students in poor districts fail to reach high school, a handful of Yangon high schools in wealthier districts such as Dagon 1, Sanchaung 2, Kamayut 2, Bahan 2, Latha 2, and TTC provide the majority of students admitted to the most selective universities in the country, highlighting the extreme shallowness of talent pool in the country. The wealthy bypass the state education system altogether, sending their children to private English language instruction schools such as YIEC or more widely known as ISM, or abroad (typically Singapore or Australia) for university education. In 2014, international schools in Yangon cost at least US$8,000 a year.

There are over 20 universities and colleges in the city. While Yangon University remains the best known (its main campus is a part of popular Burmese culture e.g. literature, music, film, etc.), the nation's oldest university is now mostly a graduate school, deprived of undergraduate studies. Following the 1988 nationwide uprising, the military government has repeatedly closed universities, and has dispersed most of the undergraduate student population to new universities in the suburbs such as Dagon University, the University of East Yangon and the University of West Yangon. Nonetheless, many of the country's most selective universities are still in Yangon. Students from around the country still have to come to study in Yangon as some subjects are offered only at its universities. The University of Medicine 1, University of Medicine 2, Yangon Technological University, University of Computer Studies and Myanmar Maritime University are the most selective in the country.

Schools for foreign expatriates include:

- International School of Myanmar
- International School Yangon
- Myanmar International School
- Yangon International School
- Lycée français international de Rangoun - Joseph-Kessel
- Yangon Japanese School

== Health care ==
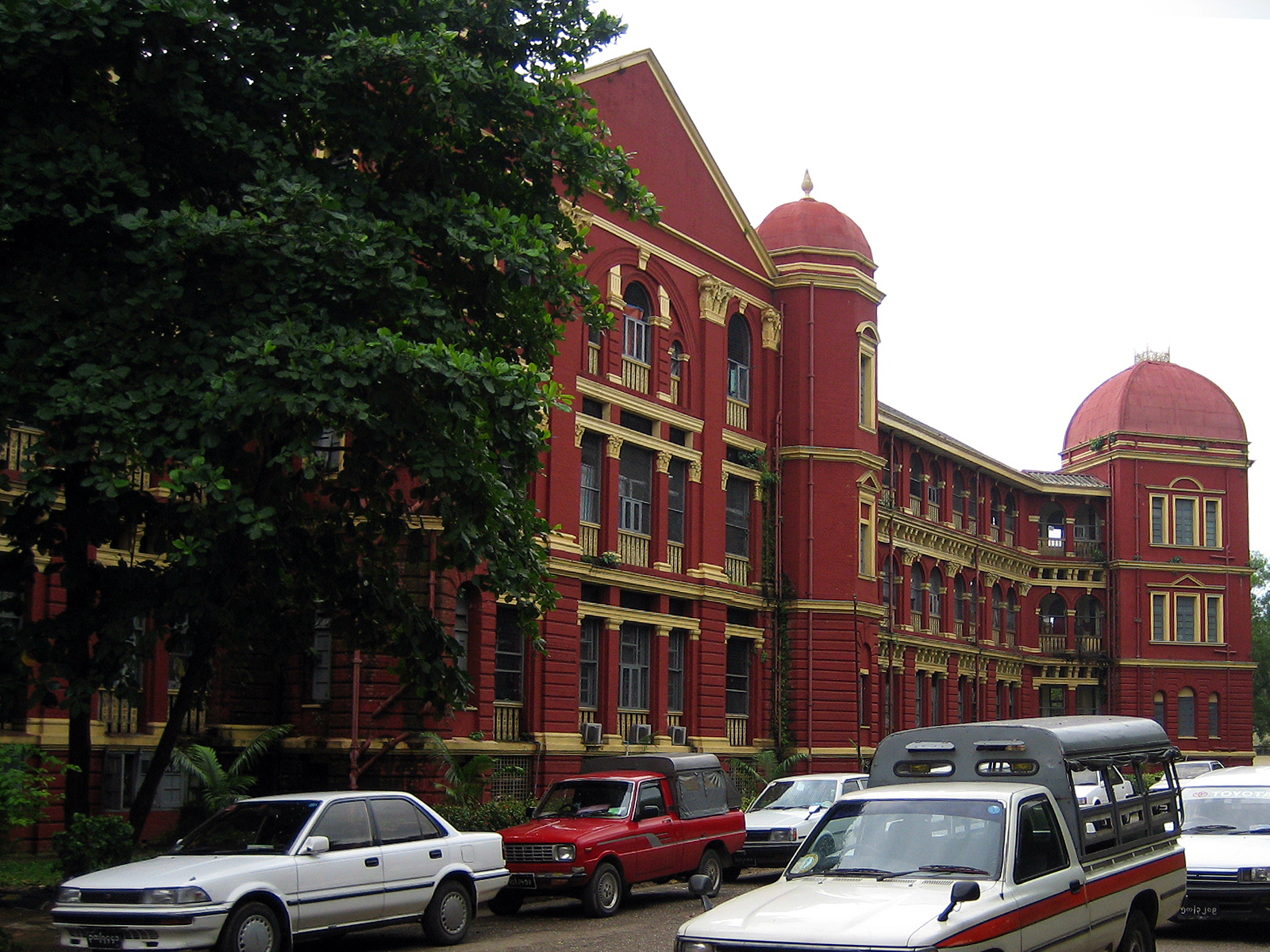
Yangon General Hospital

The general state of health care in Yangon is poor. According to a 2007 estimate, the military government spends 0.4% of the national budget on health care, and 40% to 60% on defence. By the government's own figures, it spends 849 kyats (US$0.85) per person. Although health care is nominally free, in reality, patients have to pay for medicine and treatment, even in public clinics and hospitals. Public hospitals including the flagship Yangon General Hospital lack many of the basic facilities and equipment.

Wealthier Yangonites still have access to country's best medical facilities and internationally qualified doctors. Only Yangon and Mandalay have any sizeable number of doctors left as many Burmese doctors have emigrated. The well-to-do go to private clinics or hospitals like Pun Hlaing International Hospital and Bahosi Medical Clinic. Medical malpractice is widespread, even in private clinics and hospitals that serve the well-to-do. In 2009 and 2010, a spate of high-profile deaths brought out the severity of the problem, even for the relatively well off Yangonites. The wealthy do not rely on domestic hospitals and travel abroad, usually Bangkok or Singapore, for treatment.

The following are healthcare facilities in Yangon in 2010–2011.

FY 2010–2011	Number of public hospitals	Number of private hospitals	Physician-patient ratio
Eastern District	16	10	1:3638
Western District	10	21	1:1400
Southern District	23	1	1:18,176
Northern District	25	5	1:13,647

== Notable sites ==
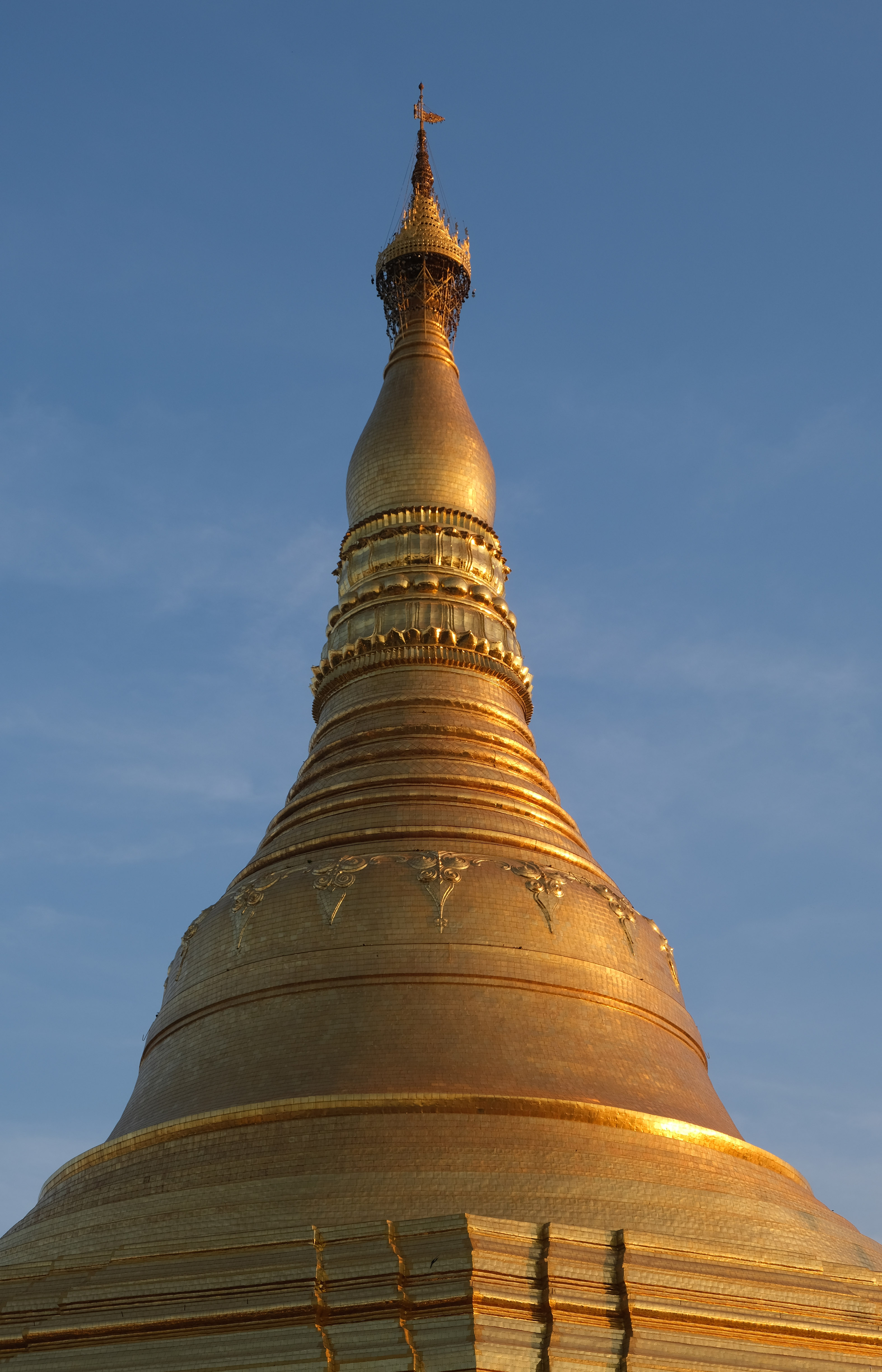
Shwedagon Pagoda

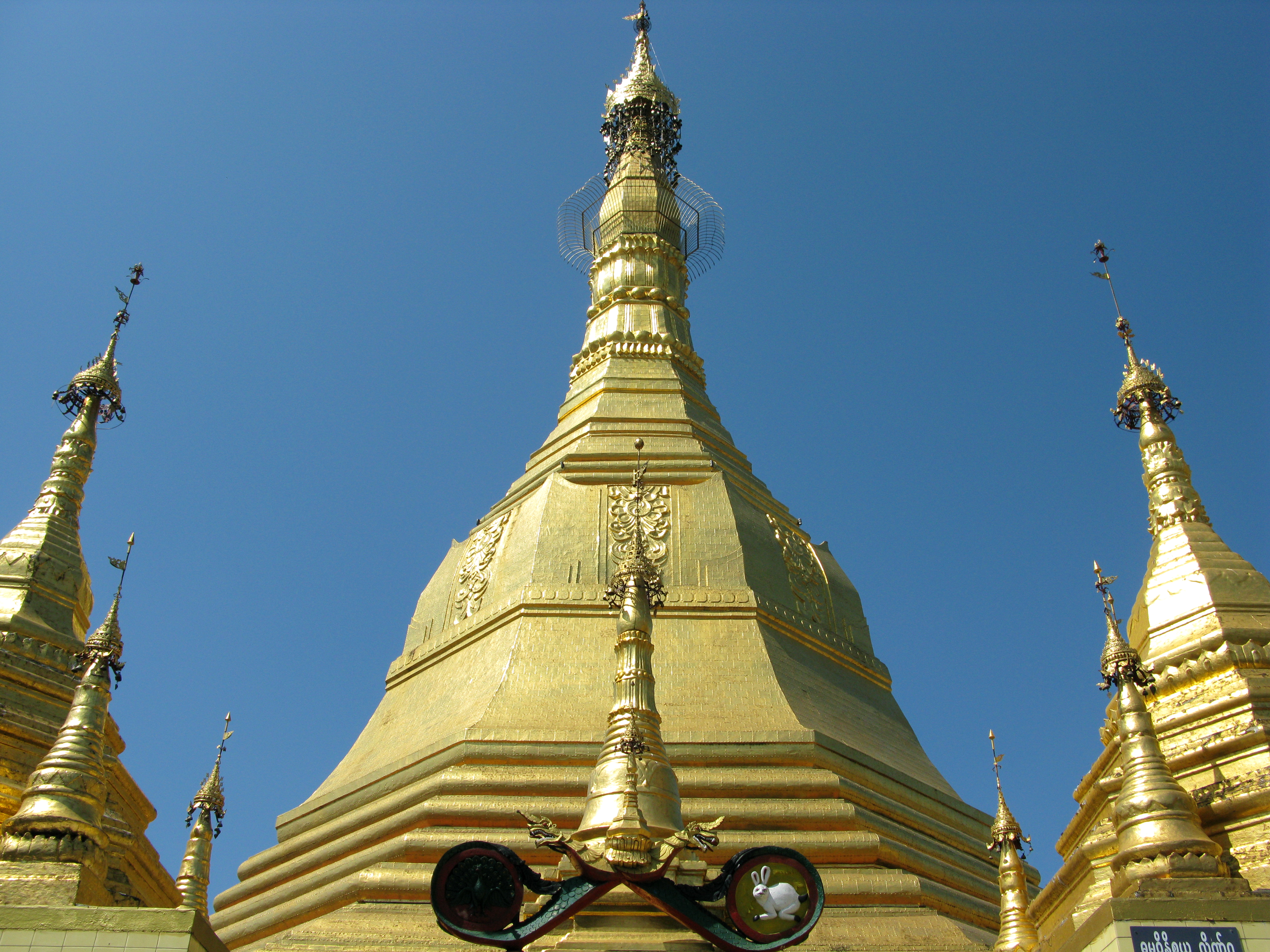
Sule Pagoda

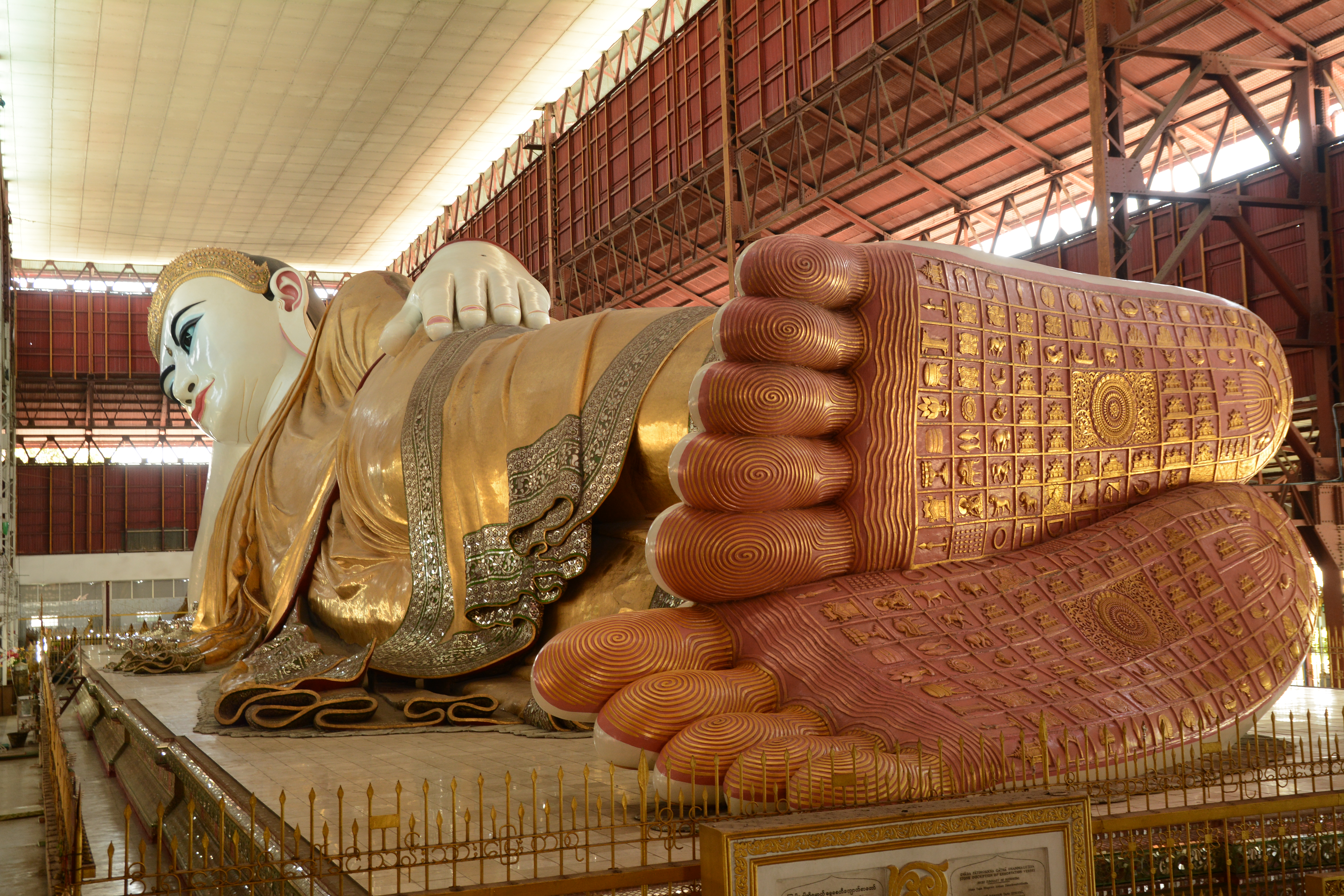
Chauk Htat Gyi Pagoda

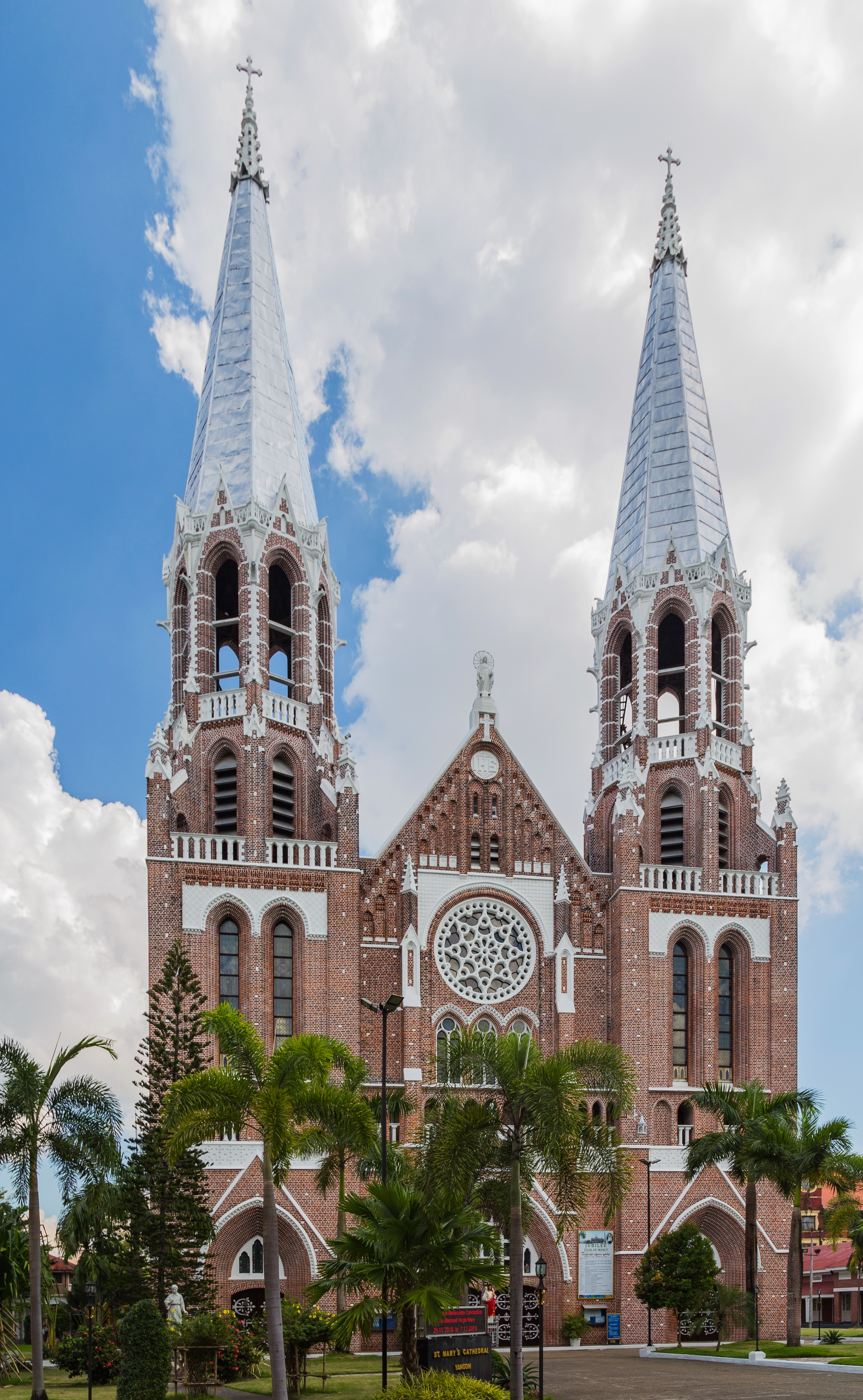
St Mary's Cathedral at the corner of Bo Aung Kyaw Road

=== Pagodas ===
- Shwedagon Pagoda
- Sule Pagoda
- Botataung Pagoda
- Chaukhtatgyi Buddha Temple
- Kyauktawgyi Buddha Temple
- Kaba Aye Pagoda
- Kyaikkhauk Pagoda
- Maha Wizaya Pagoda
- Ye Le Pagoda
- Shwe Pone Pwint Pagoda

=== Recreation ===
- Allied War Memorial
- Bogyoke Market (Scott's Market)
- Hlawga National Park
- Inya Lake (formerly Lake Victoria)
- Kandawgyi Lake (formerly Royal Lake)
- Kandawmin Garden Mausolea
- Maha Bandula Park
- Martyrs' Mausoleum
- People's Square and Park
- St Mary's Cathedral
- Sain Lan So Pyae Garden
- Yangon University
- Yangon Zoological Gardens (Yangon Zoo)

=== Museums and art galleries ===
- National Museum of Myanmar
- Myanmar Gems Museum
- Bogyoke Aung San Museum
- Yangon Drugs Elimination Museum
- Yangon Planetarium
- Yangon City Hall

=== Concert halls and theatres ===
- Yangon National Theatre
- Myanmar Convention Centre

== Notable people ==
- Nick Drake, English singer-songwriter
- Eric G. Hall (1922–1998), Air Vice Marshal and Chief of Staff of the Pakistan Air Force
- Annabella Lwin, lead vocalist of English new wave music band Bow Wow Wow
- Honey Nway Oo, prominent revolutionary in Myanmar
- Giorgi Pirtskhalava (born 1965), retired Georgian professional football player
- Zainulabedin Gulamhusain Rangoonwala (1913–1994), Indian banker
- Vijay Rupani (1956–2025), Former Chief Minister, Gujarat, India
- May Tha Hla, Anglo-Burmese psychologist and activist
- Aethel Tollemache (c. 1875–1955), British suffragette
- Sein Tun (1939–2011), physicist, university professor and author
- Zaw Lin Htut, Burmese doctor and politician
- Jack de Sequeira (1915–1989), Indian politician and businessman

== International relations ==
Yangon is a member of the Asian Network of Major Cities 21.

=== Twin towns – sister cities ===
Yangon is twinned with:

- Busan, South Korea
- Fukuoka, Japan (2016)
- Haikou, China
- Ho Chi Minh City, Vietnam (2012)
- Kathmandu, Nepal
- Kunming, China (2008)
- Nanning, China (2009)
- Quezon City, Philippines (2017)
- Yangzhou, China (1997)

== See also ==
- Rangoon Development Trust

== Notes ==
Yangon
Preceded by Mawlamyaing, Sittwe, Yangon	Capital of British Burma; 31 January 1862 – 7 March 1942; 3 May 1945 – 4 January 1948	Succeeded by End of British rule
Preceded by Yangon	Capital of Japanese Burma; 7 March 1942 – 3 May 1945	Succeeded by End of Japanese rule
Preceded by Yangon	Capital of Myanmar; 4 January 1948 – 6 November 2005	Succeeded by Naypyidaw
