= Giorgi Pirtskhalava =

Georgian footballer

Personal information
- Date of birth: 3 January 1965 (age 61)
- Place of birth: Yangon, Burma
- Height: 1.73 m (5 ft 8 in)
- Position: Defender

Senior career*
Years	Team	Apps	(Gls)
1984–1986	FC Lokomotivi Tbilisi	76	(0)
1987–1988	FC Dinamo Tbilisi	5	(1)
1988	FC Dinamo Batumi	17	(0)
1989–1993	FC Gorda Rustavi	150	(2)
1993–1994	Eintracht Oranienburg		
1994–1996	FC Dinamo Tbilisi	6	(0)
1996–1997	FC Lokomotivi Tbilisi	25	(2)
1997–1998	ASK Tbilisi	28	(4)
1998–1999	Arsenali Tbilisi	12	(0)

International career
1990–1993	Georgia	2	(0)
- * Club domestic league appearances and goals

Giorgi Pirtskhalava (born 3 January 1965 in Yangon, Burma) is a Georgian former professional footballer.
