= Asian Network of Major Cities 21 =

Defunct organisation representing large capital cities in Asia

Asian Network of Major Cities 21 was a body representing the interests of several of Asia's largest capital cities around common themes of importance, including urban planning, sustainability and crisis management. The organization was advocated by then Tokyo Governor Shintaro Ishihara (1999–2012) and formed by common declaration of those attending a meeting held in Kuala Lumpur in August 2000. Following a review by member cities in 2014, the network was suspended and projects continued under new regional initiatives by Tokyo.

== Joint projects ==
- Industry
  - Promotion of Development of a small to medium-sized Jet Passenger Plane
  - "Welcome to Asia" Campaign
  - Promotion of Asian Business and Investment Projects
  - ICT Initiatives for Urban Development
  - Development of Affordable, Safe and Fast Mass Housing Technology Project
- Environment
  - Urban and Global Environment Problems
- Civil management
  - Network for Crisis Management
- Health
  - Countermeasures to Combat Infectious Diseases in Asia
- Arts and culture
  - Asian Performing Arts Festival
- Women's Social participation
  - Women's Participation in Society
- Human resource development
  - Youth-to-Youth Program -Creating Enterprising Originals
  - Staff Capacity Enhancement Program

== Plenary Meeting ==
- The First Plenary Meeting (October 2001) – Tokyo
- The Second Plenary Meeting (November 2002) – Delhi
- The Third Plenary Meeting (November 2003) – Hanoi
- The Fourth Plenary Meeting (November 2004) – Jakarta
- The Fifth Plenary Meeting (April 2006) – Taipei
- The Sixth Plenary Meeting (November 2007) – Manila
- The Seventh Plenary Meeting (November 2008) – Kuala Lumpur
- The Eighth Plenary Meeting (November 2009) – Bangkok
- The Ninth Plenary Meeting (November 2010) – Tokyo
- The Tenth Plenary Meeting (October 2011) – Seoul
- The Eleventh Plenary Meeting (June 2012) – Singapore
- The Twelfth Plenary Meeting (November 2013) – Hanoi
- The Thirteenth Plenary Meeting (September 2014) – Tomsk
