= List of districts and neighborhoods of Yangon =

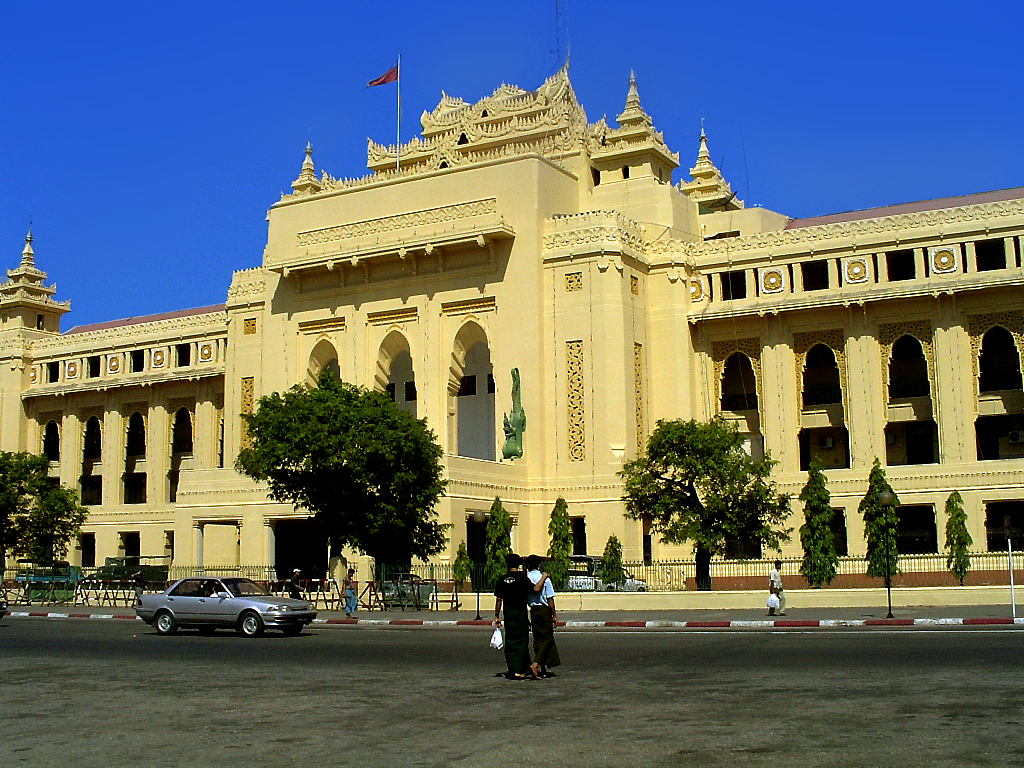
Yangon City Hall

Yangon is administered by the Yangon City Development Committee (YCDC). YCDC also coordinates urban planning. The city is divided into 10 districts. Yangon Region was divided into 4 districts, which overlap with the city's jurisdiction, this changed in 2022, now the region has 14 districts. The current mayor of Yangon is U Bo Htay , an economist and a retired professor at the Yangon Institute of Economics. Each township is administered by a committee of township leaders, who make decisions regarding city beautification and infrastructure. Myo-thit (lit. "New Towns", or satellite towns) are not within such jurisdictions. Yangon is a member of Asian Network of Major Cities 21.

== Current Divisions ==
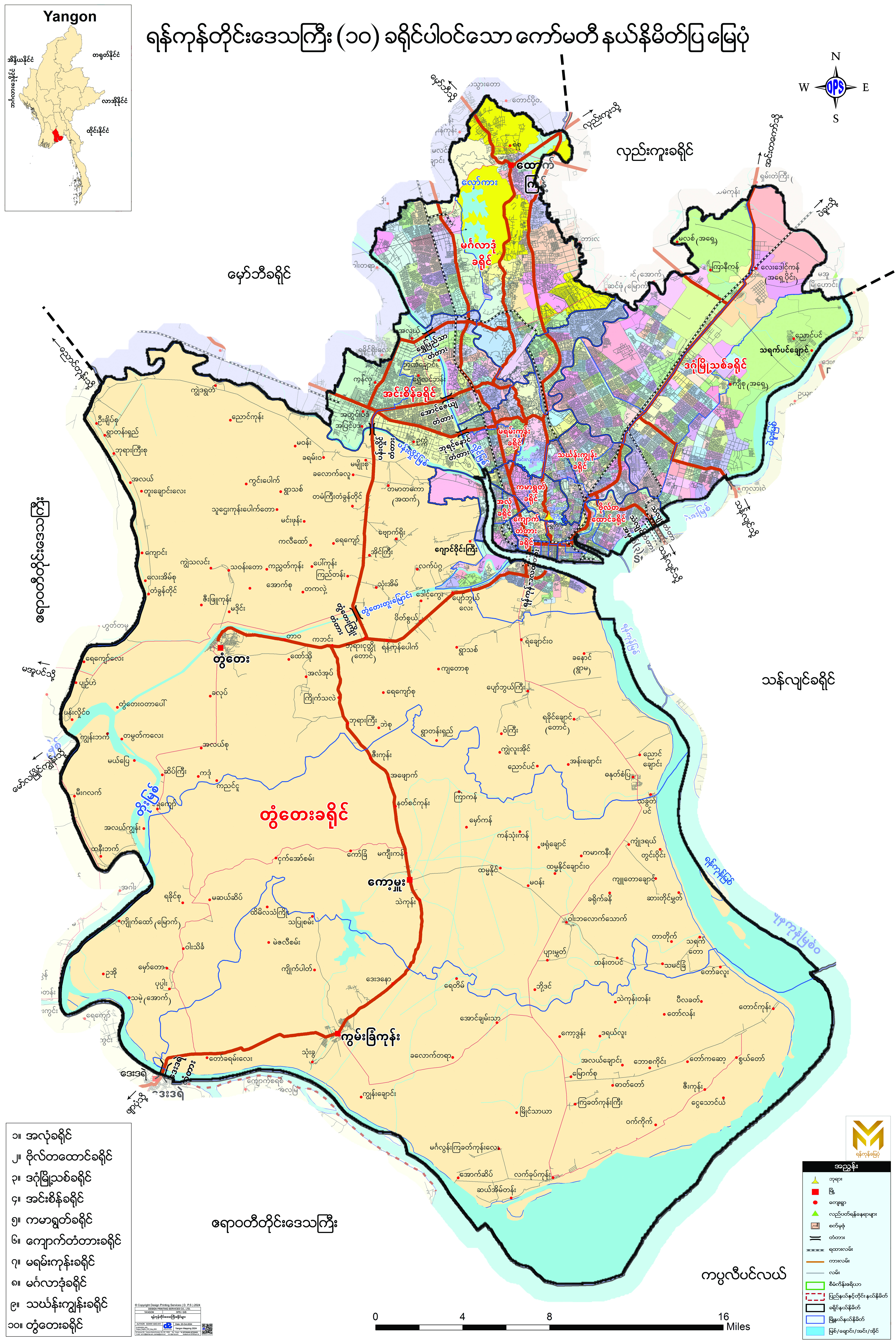
Yangon City Administrative Districts

Yangon City Townships grouped by Districts

District	Townships
Mingaladon District	Mingaladon Township • Shwepyitha Township
Insein District	Insein Township • Hlaingthaya Township (East) • Hlaingthaya Township (West)
Twantay District	Seikkyi Kanaungto Township • Dala Township; Outside of Yangon city: Twante Township • Kungyangon Township • Kawhmu Township
Kyauktada District	Kyauktada Township • Pabedan Township • Lanmadaw Township • Latha Township • Dagon Township
Ahlon District	Ahlon Township • Kyeemyindaing Township • Sanchaung Township
Mayangon District	Mayangon Township • Hlaing Township • North Okkalapa Township
Thingangyun District	Thingangyun Township • South Okkalapa Township • Tamwe Township • Yankin Township
Botahtaung District	Botataung Township • Dawbon Township • Mingala Taungnyunt Township • Pazundaung Township • Thaketa Township
Dagon Myothit District	Dagon Seikkan Township • South Dagon Township • North Dagon Township • East Dagon Township
Kamayut District	Kamayut Township • Bahan Township

== Old Divisions ==
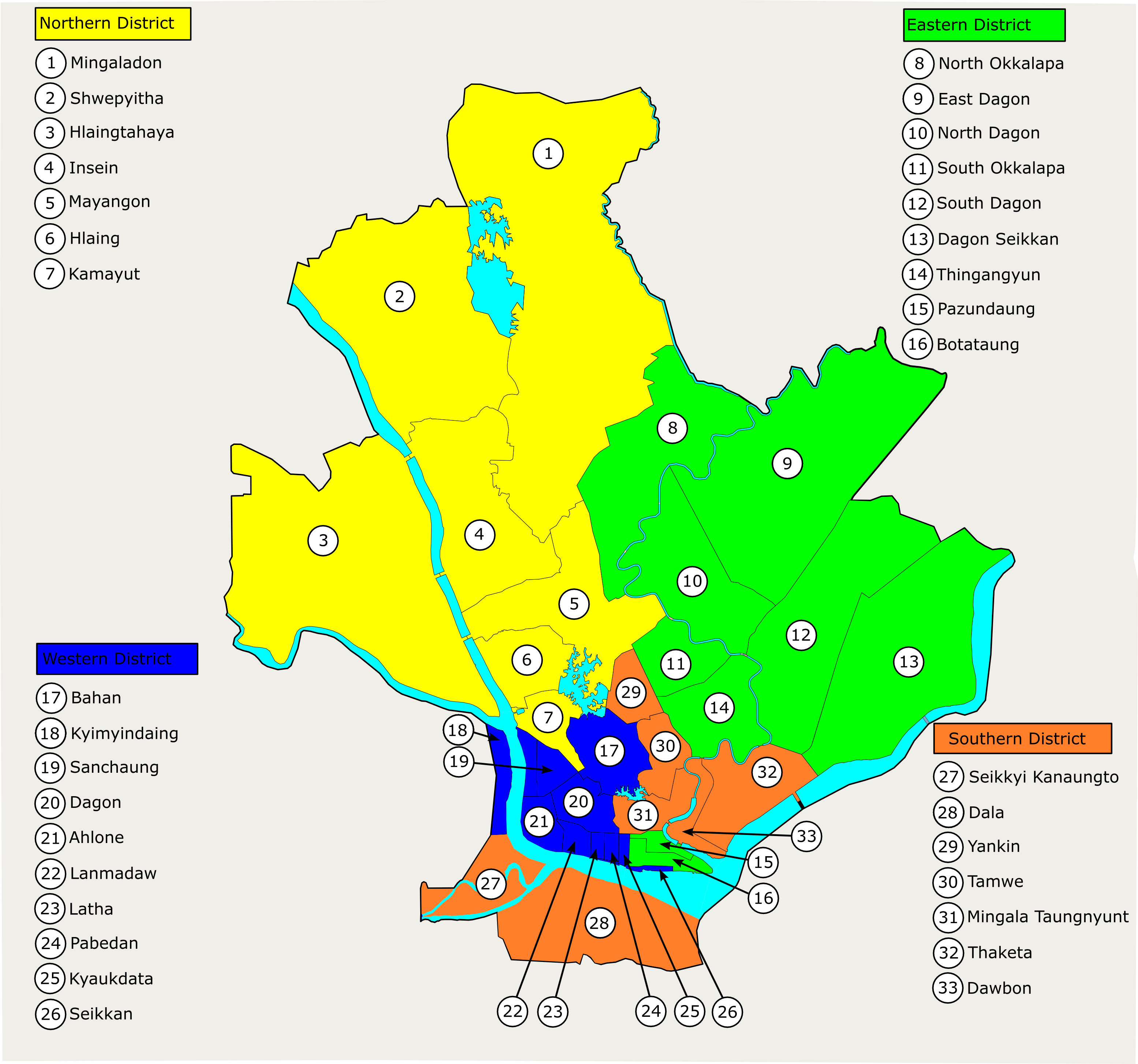
Yangon Administrative Districts (old)

Western District
- Ahlon
- Bahan
- Dagon
- Hlaing
- Kamayut
- Kyauktada
- Kyimyindaing
- Lanmadaw
- Latha
- Mayangon
- Pabedan
- Sanchaung
Eastern District
- Botataung
- Dagon Seikkan
- Dawbon
- Mingala Taungnyunt
- New Dagon East
- New Dagon North
- New Dagon South
- North Okkalapa
- Pazundaung
- South Okkalapa
- Tamwe
- Thaketa
- Thingangyun
- Yankin
Southern District
- Dala
- Seikkyi Kanaungto
Northern District
- Insein
- Hlaingthaya
- Mingaladon
- Shwepyitha
