= Botataung District =

District in Yangon, Myanmar

Botataung District ဗိုလ်တထောင်ခရိုင်
- District
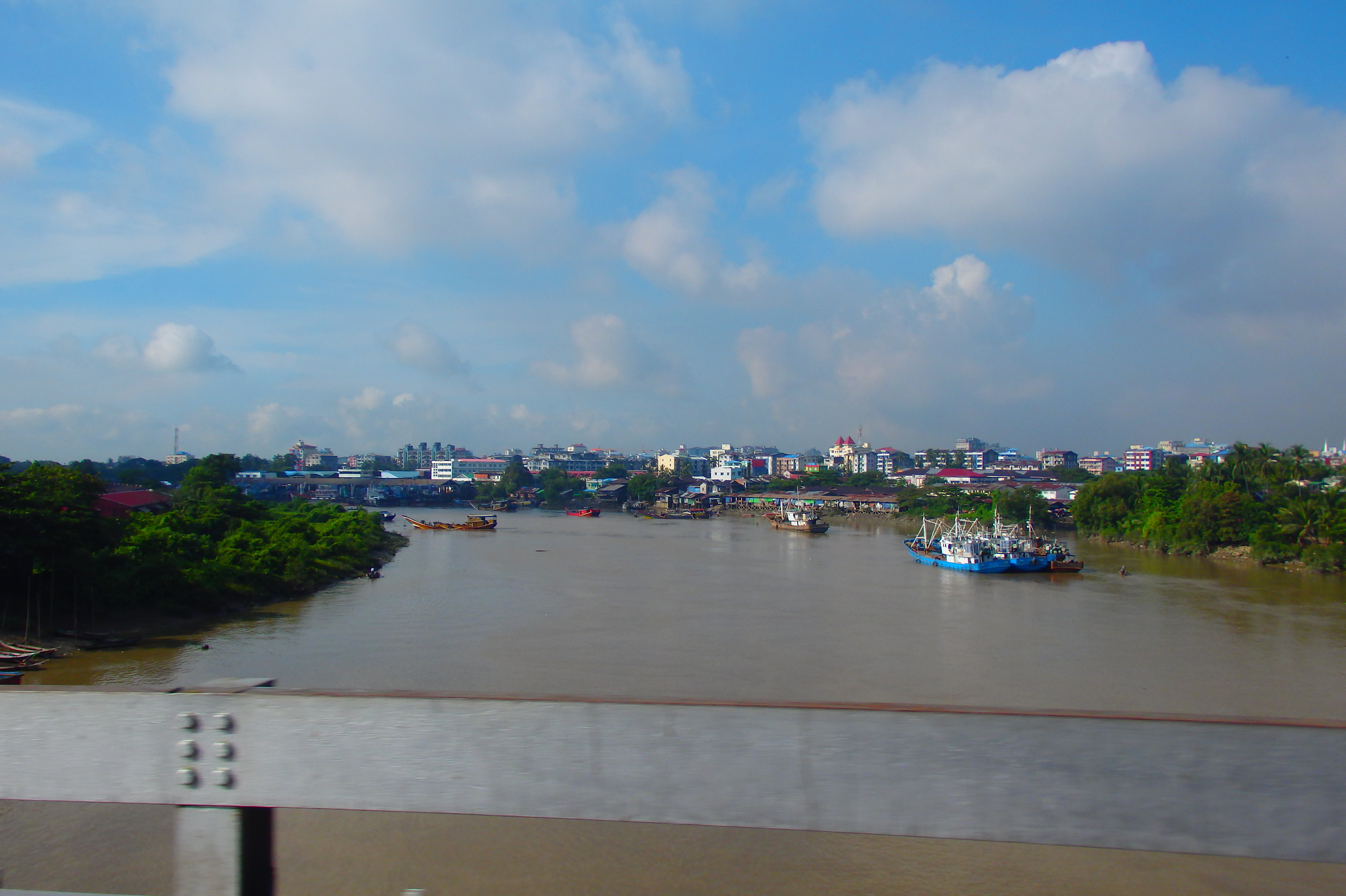
- Downtown Yangon from the Thaketa Bridge, Dawbon

- Botataung District in Yangon Region
- Coordinates: 16.785°N 96.183°E
- Country: Myanmar
- Region: Yangon Region
- City: Yangon

Government
  - Chairman: Aung Lwin
- Area code: +951

Botataung District (Burmese: ဗိုလ်တထောင်ခရိုင်, officially Bohtataung District) is a district in Yangon Region, Myanmar. It is a township in downton Yangon and contains five townships. The district was created in 2022, being one of the new districts created from the former West Yangon District. The Maha Bandula Bridge connects the western historic half with the eastern half of the district across the Pazundaung Creek.

== Administration ==
The district has five townships- Botataung Township, Mingala Taungnyunt Township and Pazundaung Township on the west side of Pazundaung Creek within Downtown Yangon and Dawbon Township and Thaketa Township east of Pazundaung Creek. The Bohtataung Township Court was upgraded to a district-level court. The district has an Administration Committee chaired by U Aung Lwin.

In 2024, it was reported that Lt. Col Maung Maung Soe earned and received 50 million kyat every day by checking the residential guest lists in Botataung District by demanding bribes from arrested individuals for their release.

== Notable Sites ==
The district's western half has a significant number of historic sites. Botataung was part of Yangon's original British city plan, with many colonial era buildings like the Ministers' Building (Secretariat) Complex and St. Mary's Cathedral, the country's largest church, remaining as designated landmarks by the Yangon City Development Committee. The township also has the Botataung Pagoda, which is unique for being a hollow stupa being rebuilt after destruction during World War II. Strand Road, which also runs west into neighbouring Kyauktada District, has several notable sites within Botataung District like the British embassy and the Strand Hotel.

The Yangon Central Railway Station is located in this district, serving as a focal point for the city and access to Myanma Railway's national rail network.

Mingala Taungnyunt is home to notable recreation sites like Bogyoke Aung San Stadium, built in 1906, and the Yangon Zoological Gardens- which includes a zoo, museum and amusement park. To the east on the Thaketa-Dawbon township border, the Yangon Waterboom Park opened in 2016 as another amusement park in the district.

Pazundaung Township, in the district's west, is an old settlement being founded sometime before 1755, when it was first mentioned during the Konbaung–Hanthawaddy War. In contrast, Thaketa Township in the district's east was founded in 1958 to relocated illegal slums into a satellite town. Today, both townships are part of the core of Yangon city, with further suburbs having been built and developed since.

== See also ==
- List of districts and neighborhoods of Yangon
