= Dagon Myothit District =

District in Yangon, Myanmar

Dagon Myothit District ဒဂုံမြို့သစ်ခရိုင် New Dagon District
- District
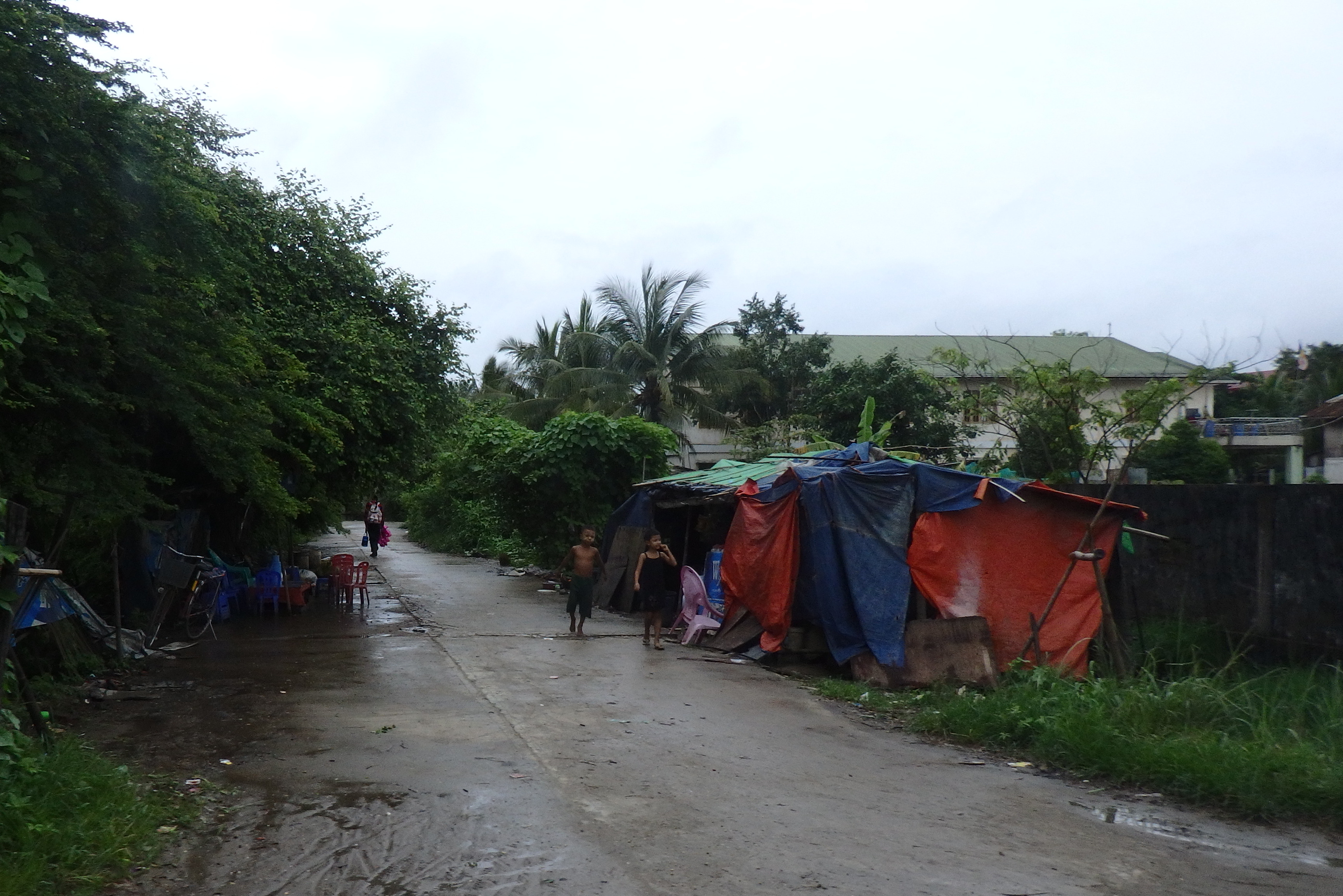
- A street in Dagon Seikkan

- Dagon Myothit District in Yangon Region
- Coordinates: 16.924°N 96.287°E
- Country: Myanmar
- Region: Yangon Region
- City: Yangon

Government
  - Chairman: Htoo Lwin
- Area code: +951

Dagon Myothit District (Burmese: ဒဂုံမြို့သစ်ခရိုင်, lit. 'New Dagon City District') is the easternmost district of Yangon in Yangon Region, Myanmar. The district contains four townships and was created in 2022, being one of the new districts created from the former East Yangon District.

== Administration ==
The district has four townships- North Dagon Township, East Dagon Township, South Dagon Township and Dagon Seikkan Township. The district received a new district-level court. The district organises a firefighting training course based out of North Dagon Township.

== History ==
The district's four townships were all created as new satellite towns in 1989 by the State Peace and Development Council military government. As of 2009, much of the district remained largely undeveloped and lacked basic municipal services.

In the 21st century, the district received more development attention. Dagon Seikkan Township was linked to the growing Thanlyin Township south of the Bago River by the Dagon Bridge, the second bridge to be built across the River in Yangon Region. The township also contains various areas with industrial zoning.

== Notable Sites ==
Dagon University, located in North Dagon Township, is one of the largest universities in Myanmar with a large 1,582-acre (6.40 km^{2}) campus offering bachelor's and master's degrees in liberal arts and sciences to full-time, part-time and online students.

Dagon Seikkan has seen new commercial retail developments in the 2020s like Samanea Yangon Market.

== See also ==
- List of districts and neighborhoods of Yangon
