= Maung Maung Theik =

Artist

- Born: Maung Maung Thikr; March 16, 1946; Yangon
- Died: August 5, 2011 (aged 65); Shwebaho Hospital, Yangon
- Known for: Painting; illustrations

Maung Maung Theik (မောင်မောင်သိုက်; March 16, 1946–August 5, 2011) was a Burmese painter, illustrator and cartoonist. His works have achieved broad popularity in Myanmar and overseas. He drew the flag of the National League for Democracy party, formed after the 8888 uprising.

== Early life and education ==
Theik was born on 16 March 1946 in Rangoon (now Yangon). His father is U Lwin and his mother is Mya Nyunt. He was the youngest of six siblings. He attended Central National High School (now Basic Education High School No. 1 Latha).

== Careers ==
He learned the basics of art from the artist U Kyi and started his art career. He started as a painter in 1965, and worked as illustrator starting in 1971. He started painting at Cho Shin Shin Magazine and worked as a mechanical drawing artist in the Myanmar Air Force for four years.

He created a large number of paintings and exhibited many of them. He had his first solo exhibition at the Inya Lake Hotel in 1991, the second time with the title "Woman"; 11 June to 10 July 2005, at the New York University Art Gallery. He was also presented with the title the Myanmar Dance and Beauty Show at the President's Hotel from 1975 to 2008.

His third solo exhibition was held at Gallery 65 from 17 to 19 August 2013.

== Death ==
On 5 August 2011, he died at Shwebaho Hospital at 12:30 pm. He was 66 yrs old at the time of his death.
