= Mayangon District =

District in Yangon, Myanmar

Mayangon District မရမ်းကုန်းခရိုင်
- District
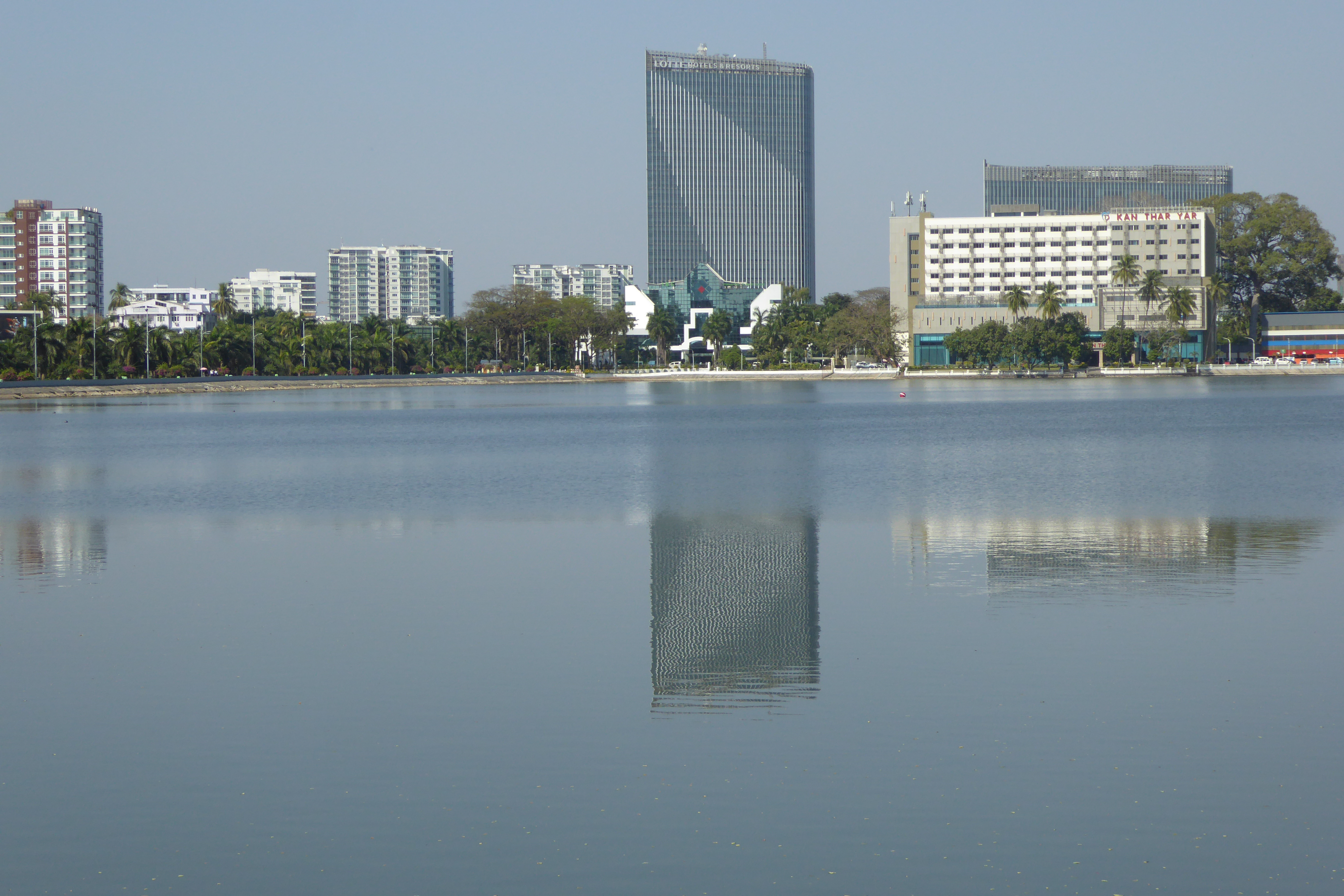
- View of Hlaing Township from Inya Lake

- Mayangon District in Yangon Region
- Coordinates: 16.861°N 96.152°E
- Country: Myanmar
- Region: Yangon Region
- City: Yangon

Government
  - Chairman: Kyaw Thet Khaing
- Area code: +951

Mayangon District (Burmese: မရမ်းကုန်းခရိုင်) is a district in Yangon Region, Myanmar. It is a township of Yangon and contains three townships. The district was created in 2022, being one of the new districts created from the former West Yangon District and East Yangon District.

The district contains Inya Lake, which provides access to recreational activities to city residents. Its economy is primarily based on the service sector, having multiple major hospitals, hotels and various other services like information technology related businesses.

== Administration ==
The district has three townships- Mayangon Township, Hlaing Township and North Okkalapa Township. The Mayangon Township Court was upgraded to a district-level court. The district has an Administrative Committee that oversees local government headed by chairman Kyaw Thet Khaing. The other members of the committee are Lt. Col. Phyo Aung Hein, Kyin Win and Ministry of Labour representative Aye Khaing Ohn.

== Notable Sites ==
The district contains Inya Lake, a 19th-century artificial lake popular as green space and water recreation area today. Within the district, the lake is surrounded by grand homes, including those built by former dictator Ne Win and the Inya Lake Hotel, a gift from Nikita Khrushchev Besides the areas near Inya Lake, Mayangon also has the upscale neighbourhood of Parami and notable pagodas like Kaba Aye Pagoda where the Sixth Buddhist Council was held from 1954 to 1956.

Hlaing Township has become a part of the Yangon city economic core region over the 2010s and is primarily a service-sector economy. Most prominent in sectors are computer services in the Myanmar Information and Computer Technology (MICT) Park and the 18 car showrooms within the township (as of 2018). There are 6 YCDC managed markets within the township alongside 2 privately operated shopping centres.

North Okkalapa was initially established as part of a satellite town in 1959, but is now firmly in Yangon city. Mayangon District as a whole forms the area where the city proper transitions into the suburbs.

== See also ==
- List of districts and neighborhoods of Yangon
