= Federation of General Workers Myanmar =

National trade union federation in Myanmar

- Abbreviation: FGWM
- Formation: September 2019; 7 years ago
- Location: Myanmar
- Members: 35,000 (2024)
- Chairwoman: Moe Sandar Myint
- Affiliations: International Confederation of Labour

The Federation of General Workers Myanmar (FGWM) is a trade union federation in Myanmar. Established by 20 trade unions in 2019, it grew to count 40 unions and 35,000 members, most of whom worked in the garment sector. The FGWM organized against unsafe working conditions during the COVID-19 pandemic and for increased labour protections in the country. Following the 2021 Myanmar coup d'état, the FGWM became a leading force in the anti-junta protests, for which it was repressed by the military, with many of its members forced into clandestinity or exile. In 2026, it affiliated itself with the International Confederation of Labour.

== History ==
=== Formation and organization ===
The Federation of General Workers Myanmar (FGWM) was formed in September 2019 by twenty trade unions, representing workers primarily from the garment, manufacturing and transportation sectors. In its founding statutes, the FGWM proclaimed itself to be a democratic, self-organized and member-led federation, which aimed to improve living and working conditions, with the ultimate goal of ending exploitation of labour. Led by chairwoman Moe Sandar Myint, the FGWM's twenty unions soon became active in labour negotiations and protests for better working conditions. By 2024, the FGWM was estimated to have 40 affiliated trade unions, with a combined total of about 35,000 members, most of which worked in the garment sector. In 2026, the FGWM applied for membership of the International Confederation of Labour (ICL), which was approved unanimously by the ICL's member sections.

=== Early strike actions ===
On 4 October 2019, four FGWM workers were injured when factory owners drove over them in their car after failed labour negotiations in Hlaingthaya Township. Seven months later, officials launched a case against FGWM leaders for wrongful restraint and assault. The leaders said that while they had been present at the negotiations, they were not present when the workers had tried to stop the factory owners from leaving.

On 28 March 2020, during the COVID-19 pandemic, hundreds of FGWM members were let off and their March salary withheld from Myan Mode, a supplier for Zara, Mango and C&A. The let-offs came after workers had refused to work four hours of overtime, fearing a coronavirus infection, and after negotiations between the union and owners. In response, FGWM workers established a protest camp outside the factory gates, a common union tactic in Myanmar, without blocking access to the factory. On 3 April, Myan Mode owners agreed to pay the fired workers' outstanding wages, but the workers continued their camp. Protests at Myan Mode and five other factories were called off in the second half of April. On 30 May, FGWM and Myan Mode negotiations led to an agreement that stated 25 union workers would be reinstated immediately, 50 after two months, and the rest following the end of the pandemic.

In January 2021, Chinese-owned Hong Yun factory, located in the Yangon Region, was shut down after only eight months in operation. The stated reason was cancelled orders, but FGWM suspected owners wanted to get rid of workers. After negotiations with the employer, who had his passport seized by authorities because workers did not trust him, he agreed to pay outstanding wages for December and one month's wages as compensation to each worker. Also in that month, FGWM, together with other trade unions called on the Myanmar government to establish a dedicated Labour Ministry in contrast to the existing Ministry of Labour, Employment and Social Security.

=== Against the coup ===
Following the 2021 Myanmar coup d'état, members of the FGWM immediately gathered in their workplaces to denounce the coup and demand the release of political prisoners and the recognition of the results of the 2020 Myanmar general election. Workers of the FGWM began engaging in civil disobedience in their workplaces, wearing their union uniforms and singing revolutionary songs. The FGWM soon joined the nationwide anti-junta protests, demanding the abolition of the military dictatorship, the establishment of a federal democracy, the repeal of the 2008 Constitution of Myanmar, and the release of all imprisoned labour activists. On 6 February, thousands of workers from 60 trade unions, led by the FGWM, coordinated a peaceful protest in the Burmese capital of Yangon. 4,000 FGWM workers from Hlaingthaya travelled by trucks to Yangong to participate in the anti-coup protests. According to Tin Maung Htwe, this action by thousands of garment workers "initiat[ed] Yangon's first significant protest events", with the FGWM soon leading the formation of the Revolutionary Front. Htwe also noted that the FGWM coordinated the first woman-led protest movement.

On 26 February, the State Administration Council (SAC) banned sixteen labour organizations in the country, accusing them of inciting unrest against the military junta. The offices of the FGWM were subsequently shut down and its assets seized by the military, while FGWM leaders, including chairwoman Moe Sandar Myint, were targetted for arrest and fled into hiding or exile. Some FGWM members fled over the border into Thailand, while others remained behind to organize clandestinely. Nevertheless, the FGWM continued to lead strike actions and participate protests against the junta. In early March, FGWM chairwoman Moe Sandar Myint said existing agreements signed by international brands did not sufficiently obligate them to ensure that workers at supplying factories would not suffer negative consequences for attending protests. The FGWM called for fashion brands to cease production in Myanmar and pull their operations out of the country, and demanded that the European Union (EU) to terminate its "Everything but Arms" trade arrangement with Myanmar. Over the spring of 2021, several clothing companies, including H&M and Primark, suspended their operations in Myanmar; the FGWM estimated that one-third of the country's garment factories shut down that year. However, the EU decided not to suspend trade with the junta.
