= North Okkalapa Township =

Township of Yangon, Myanmar

North Okkalapa Township မြောက်‌ဥက္ကလာပ မြို့နယ်
- Township of Yangon
- North Okkalapa Township
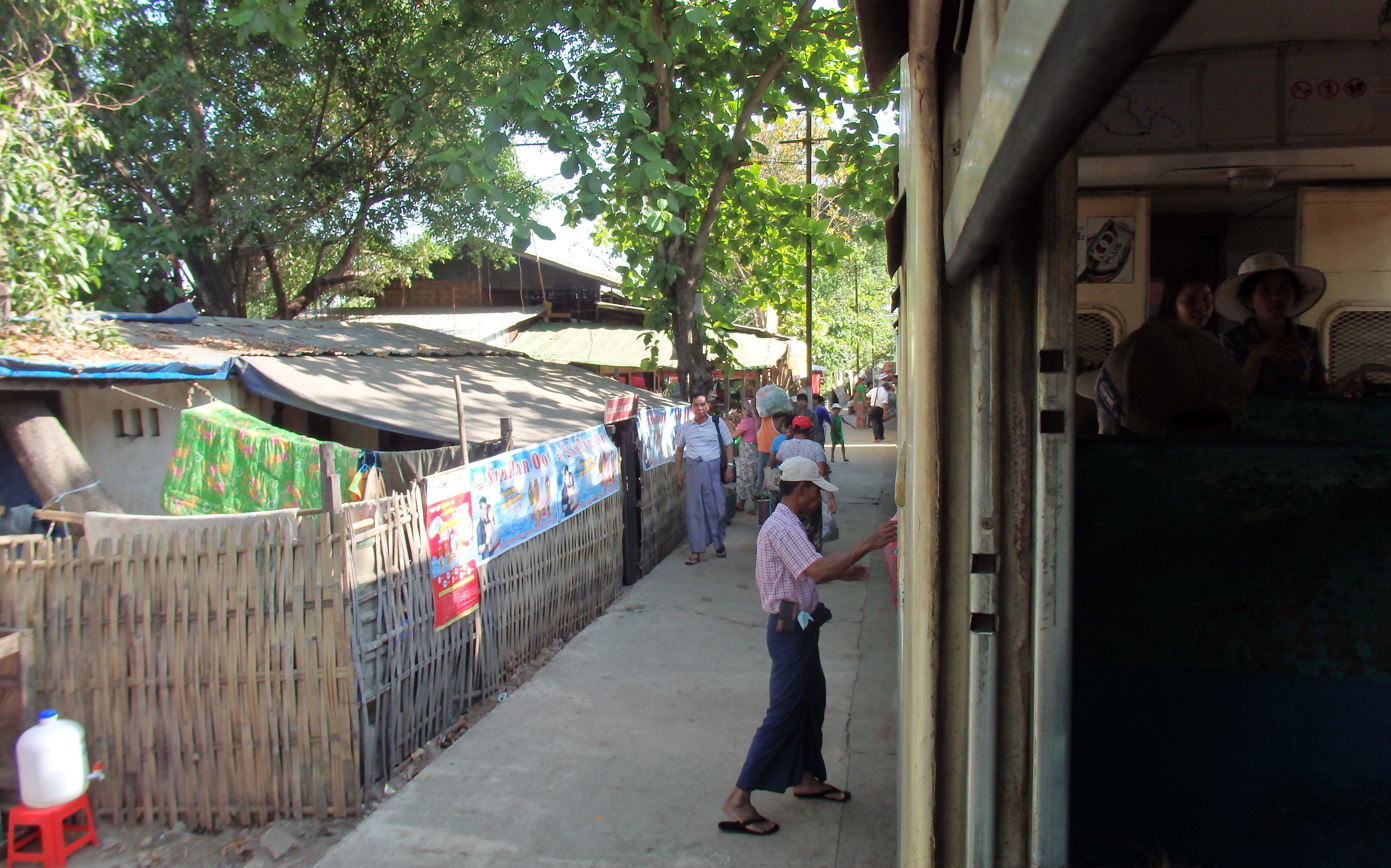
- Kyaukyaytwin Station on the Yangon Circular Railway

- Location within Myanmar
- Coordinates: 16°49′0″N 96°6′0″E
- Country: Myanmar
- Region: Yangon Region
- City: Yangon
- District: Mayangon District
- Settled: 1959

Area
  - Total: 28.3 km^{2} (10.91 sq mi)
- Elevation: 8 m (26 ft)

Population (2000)
  - Total: 243,000
  - Density: 8,600/km^{2} (22,300/sq mi)
- Time zone: UTC6:30 (MST)
- Postal codes: (11031, 11032)
- Area codes: 1 (mobile: 80, 99)

North Okkalapa Township (Burmese: မြောက်‌ဥက္ကလာပ မြို့နယ် [mjaʊʔ ʔoʊʔkəlàpa̰ mjo̰nɛ̀]) is located in the eastern part of Yangon. The township comprises 19 wards, and shares borders with Hlegu Township and Mingaladon township in the north, North Dagon Township in the east, Mingaladon Township and Mayangon Township in the west, and Kamayut Township, and Mayangon and South Okkalapa Townships in the south. North Okkalapa was one of the satellite towns established in 1959. Today, it is a firmly established part of the city, albeit with nominal access to the city's electricity grid and sewer system. It is located in the 5 to 30 minute drive zone to Yangon International Airport, the primary and busiest international airport of Myanmar, located in Mingaladon Township. For those who loves local trips, Aung Mingalar Highway Bus Station is located within 30 min drive zone from the township.

== Education ==
The township has 30 government primary schools, seven middle schools and five high schools.

It is also the homeland to one of the most selective universities in the nation: the University of Medicine 2, Yangon, and the University of Pharmacy, Yangon.

Free monastery Foreign Speaking Training Classes and paid ones can be found in the zone.

Also, private soft skill training schools and computer training centers are located in most strategic locations in the township.

== Health ==
The North Okkalapa General Hospital, an affiliated teaching hospital of the University of Medicine 2, is the major hospital for the township and vicinity.

Waibargi Hospital is well-known for providing medical treatments for infectious diseases.

Many private hospitals, such as La Gabar, OSC, and Shwe LaMin hospitals, which are well-known for treatments and services, are located in the township.

Moreover, numerous private clinics are found throughout the township.

== Parks and gardens ==
Name	Estimated Area	Location	Notes
Okkalar Thiri Park		Near Khaymar Thi Rd and Thudhamma Rd Junction (Awine)	recreation place to take exercises and get refreshed
Kan Thar Yar Park		Near Khaymar Thi Rd and Thudhamma Rd Junction (Fun Valley)	Kantharyar shopping center, Bogyoke Statue,Fun Valley, food stores and kids' playground are located in the park zone.
Mya Yi Nandar Park		Withakar Street, nearby Waibargi Fire Station and electrical Substation.	

== Landmarks ==
The following is a list of landmarks in North Okkalapa township.

Structure	Type	Address	Notes
Meilamu Pagoda	Pagoda	Thudhamma Road	
Mahar Kyain Thitsarshin Pagoda	Buddha Statue	Thunandar Road, near junction of Thunandar Road And Thudhamma Road	

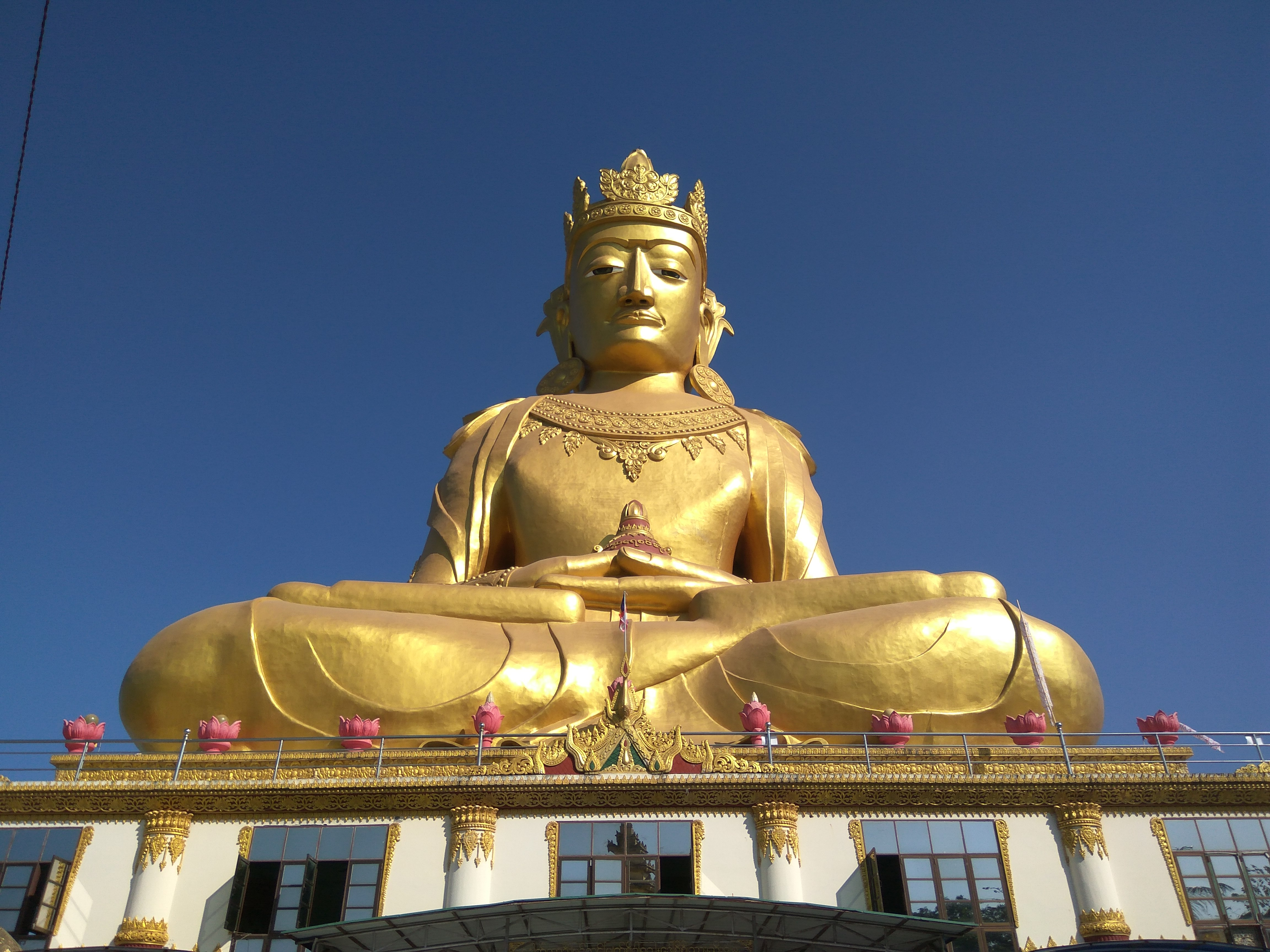
Mahar Kyein Thit Sar Shin Pagoda
