= East Dagon Township =

Township of Yangon, Myanmar

East Dagon Township ဒဂုံမြို့သစ်အရှေ့ပိုင်း မြို့နယ်
- Township of Yangon
- East Dagon Township
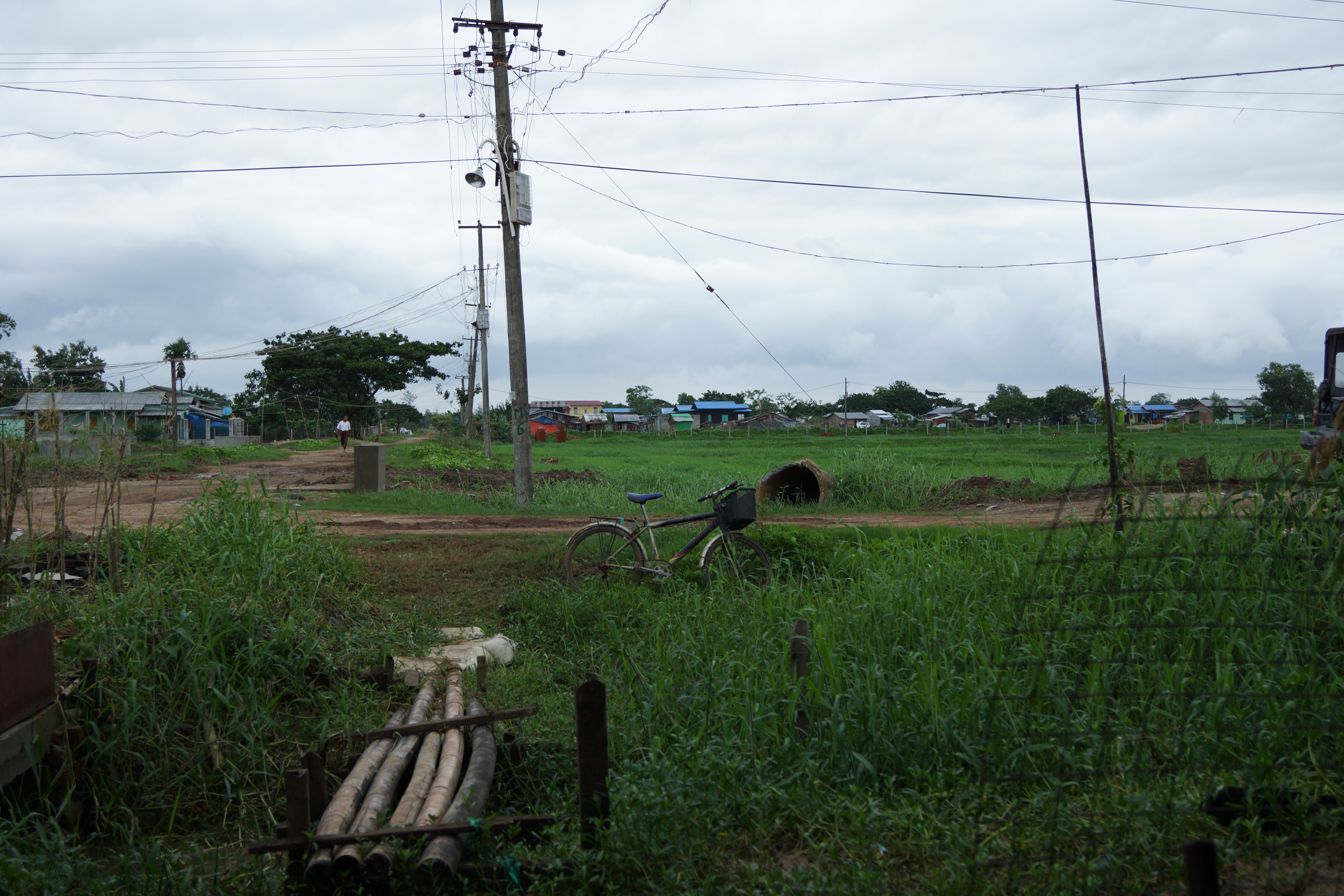
- East Dagon Township

- Location within Myanmar
- Coordinates: 16°53′0″N 96°17′0″E
- Country: Myanmar
- Region: Yangon Region
- City: Yangon
- District: Dagon Myothit District
- Settled: 1989

Area
  - Total: 91.03 km^{2} (35.148 sq mi)

Population (2000)
  - Total: 71,000
  - Density: 780/km^{2} (2,000/sq mi)
- Time zone: UTC6:30 (MST)
- Postal codes: 11451
- Area code: 1 /(mobile phone:+9595+)

East Dagon Township (also East Dagon Myothit; Burmese: ဒဂုံမြို့သစ်အရှေ့ပိုင်း မြို့နယ် [dəɡòʊɰ̃ mjo̰ðɪʔ ʔəʃḛbáɪɴ mjo̰nɛ̀]) is located in the easternmost part of Yangon, Myanmar. The township comprises 54 wards and three village tracts. It shares borders with Hlegu Township in the north, North Dagon Township in the west, and South Dagon Township in the south and west. One of new satellite towns founded in 1989 by the military government that came to power in 1988, East Dagon is still largely undeveloped and lacks basic municipal services.

The township has 19 primary schools, four middle schools and two high schools.

The Ngamoyeik Creek cuts through East Dagon Township. The Toe Gyaung Ga Lay railway station is a stop on the Yangon–Mandalay Railway. Several bus lines connect East Dagon to downtown and other parts of the city.
