= Mingala Taungnyunt Township =

Mingala Taungnyunt Township မင်္ဂလာ‌တောင်ညွန့် မြို့နယ်
- Township of Yangon
- Mingala Taungnyunt Township
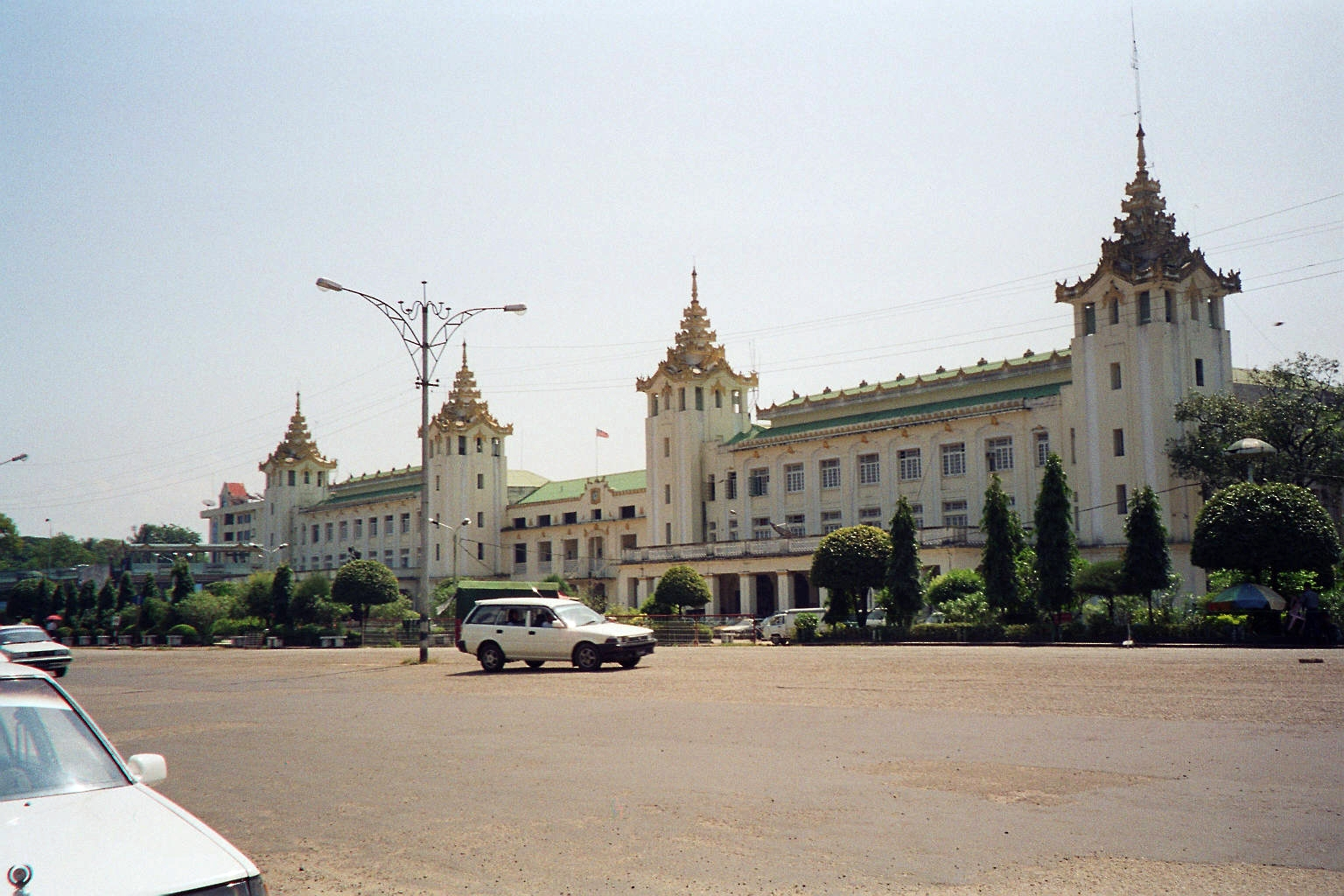
- Yangon Central Railway Station

- Location within Myanmar
- Coordinates: 16°47′0″N 96°10′0″E
- Country: Myanmar
- Region: Yangon Region
- City: Yangon
- District: Botataung District

Area
  - Total: 5.06 km^{2} (1.955 sq mi)

Population (2000)
  - Total: 98,000
  - Density: 19,000/km^{2} (50,000/sq mi)
- Time zone: UTC+6:30 (MST)
- Postal codes: 11221, 11222
- Area codes: 1, (80, 99: mobile)

Mingala Taungnyunt Township (Burmese: မင်္ဂလာ‌တောင်ညွန့် မြို့နယ် [mɪ̀ɰ̃ɡəlà tàʊɰ̃ ɲʊ̰ɰ̃ mjo̰nɛ̀]; also spelled Mingalar Taung Nyunt) is a township of Yangon, Myanmar. Located in the east-central part of the city, the township consists of 20 wards, and shares borders with Dagon Township in the west, Bahan township in the north, Botataung Township in the south, Kyauktada Township in the southwest, and the Pazundaung Creek and Dawbon Township in the east.

With nearly 100,000 residents, it is one of the most populous townships in the city. Mingala Taungnyunt has 21 primary schools, two middle schools and six high schools.

== Landmarks ==
Yangon Central Railway Station and Aung San Stadium are located on the western side of the township, near downtown. Prominent shopping places like Yuzana Plaza and Mingalar market buildings are located in the township. It also hosts attractive parks like Kandawgyi Nature Park and Yangon Zoological Garden. Mingala Taungnyunt township was part of the original city plan laid out the British. Some of the buildings and structures of "architectural significance" are now designated landmarks by the Yangon City Development Committee.

Structure	Type	Address	Notes
Bethlehem Lutheran Church	Church	181-183 Theinbyu Road	
Kandawgalay Mosque	Mosque	106 Upper Pansodan Road	
Methodist Association Headquarters	Church	20-22 Alanpyapaya Road	
St. Anthony's Church	Church	24 Upper Pansodan Road	
Sri Hanuman Temple	Hindu Temple	21 Kanyeiktha Lane	
Sri Marian Temple	Hindu Temple	Corner of Daw Thein Tin Lane and 94th Street	
Sri Nagarthan Sulamani Hindu Temple	Hindu Temple	57 Factory Lane	
Three-Corner Mosque	Mosque	35 Upper Pansodan Road	
Yangon Central Railway Station	Railway Station	Kunchan Lane	

== Notable residents ==
- Sut Ring Pan (journalist).
