= Insein District =

District in Yangon Region, Myanmar

Insein District အင်းစိန်ခရိုင်
- District
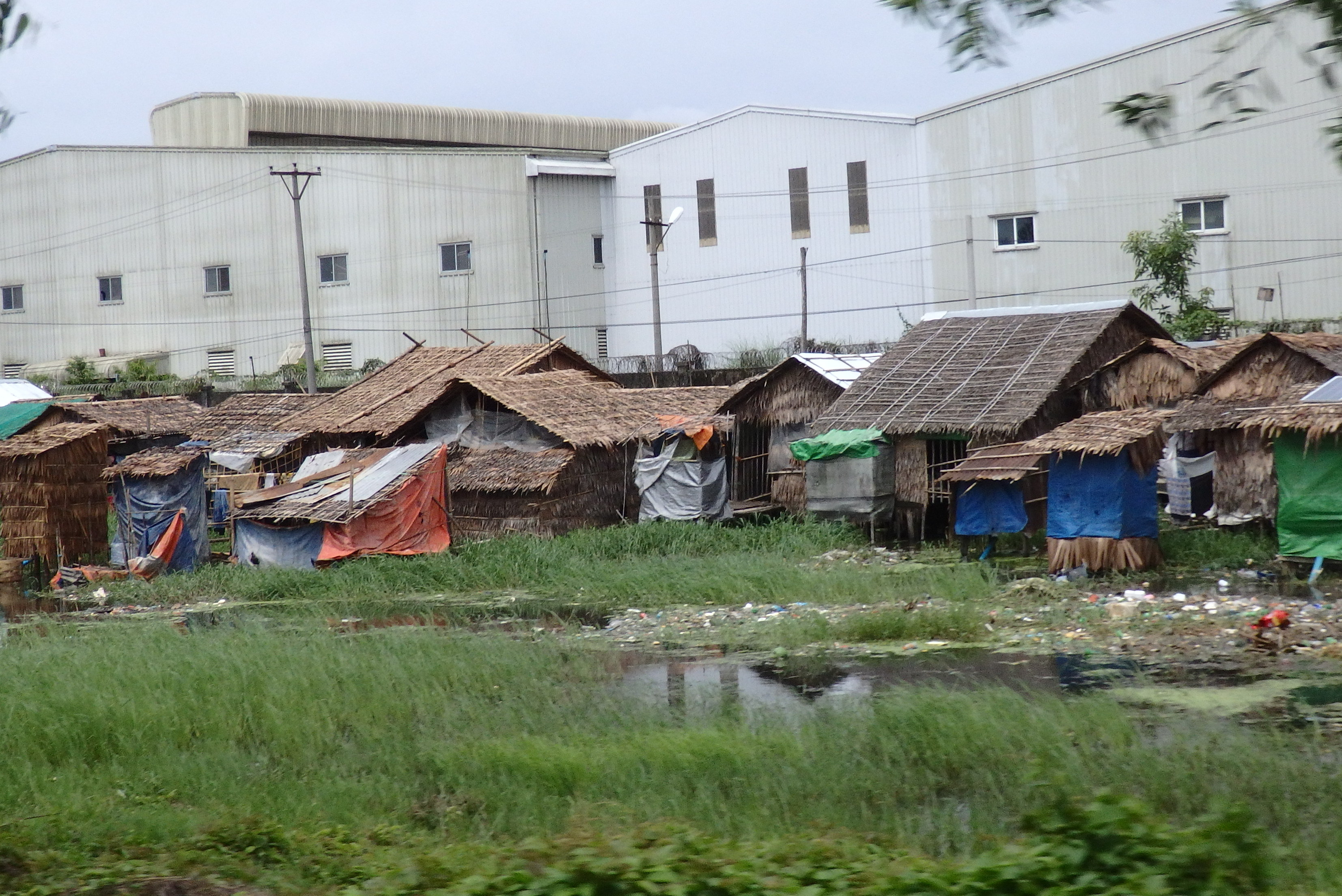
- Informal housing near factories, Hlaingthaya

- Insein District in Yangon Region
- Coordinates: 16.984°N 96.116°E
- Country: Myanmar
- Region: Yangon Region
- City: Yangon
- Area code: +951

Insein District (Burmese: အင်းစိန်ခရိုင်) is a District in Yangon Region, Myanmar. It is a district under the Yangon City Development Committee as part of Yangon and contains Insein Township, Hlaingthaya East Township and Hlaingthaya West Township. The district was created in 2022, being one of the new districts created from the former North Yangon District.

== Geography ==
Insein District is home to Insein Prison, notorious worldwide for its inhumane conditions, corruption, abuse of inmates, and use of mental and physical torture, especially against political dissidents during the 1988-2011 State Law and Order Restoration Council era.

It also contains the two townships split from the former Hlaingthaya Township. This former township was the biggest and most populous township in the country, with 15% of Yangon's urban population living there. According to the 2014 Myanmar census, 687,864 people lived in the township. This made it the single largest township by population in the country. Hlaingthaya also has a major industrial and factory presence.

Hlaingthaya planned to split the township into two, due to violence and over-population, according to reports in 2019, although no official announcement could be found, the township had already been split in West and East constituencies for the 2020 Myanmar general election. In 2023, the General Administration Department issued documents reporting on the two townships separately, stating that the townships had been separated into new townships on 27 January 2020 according to Legal Notification 32/2020.

== See also ==
- List of districts and neighborhoods of Yangon
