= Dawbon Township =

Township of Yangon, Myanmar

Dawbon Township ဒေါပုံ မြို့နယ်
- Township of Yangon
- Dawbon Township
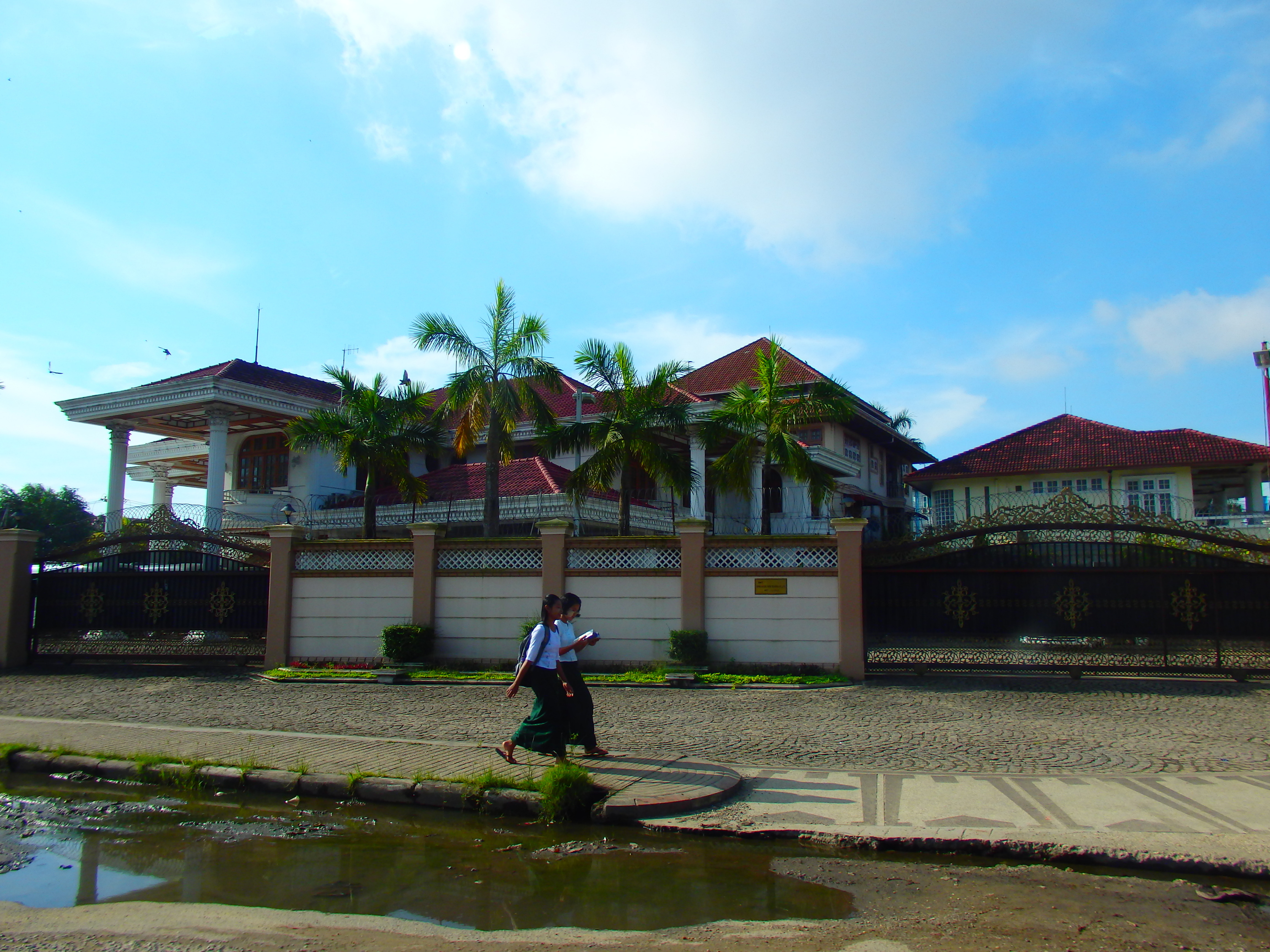
- Students walking in Dawbon Township

- Location of the township in Yangon.

- Location within Myanmar
- Coordinates: 16°40′0″N 96°11′0″E
- Country: Myanmar
- Region: Yangon Region
- City: Yangon
- District: Botataung District

Area
  - Total: 3.7 km^{2} (1.42 sq mi)

Population (2014)
  - Total: 75,325
  - Density: 20,500/km^{2} (53,000/sq mi)
- Time zone: UTC6:30 (MST)
- Postal codes: 11241
- Area codes: 1 (mobile: 80, 99)

Dawbon Township (Burmese: ဒေါပုံ မြို့နယ် [dɔ́bòʊɰ̃ mjo̰nɛ̀]) is located in the southeastern part of Yangon, Myanmar. The township comprises 14 wards, and shares borders with Thingangyun township in the north, Mingala Taungnyunt township in the west, Thaketa township in the east, and Pazundaung township in the south across the Pazundaung Creek. Dawbon is connected to downtown Yangon via the Maha Bandula Bridge.

The township has twelve primary schools, four middle schools and one high school.

== Population ==
Dawbon Township's population is over 75,000, with 51.2% of female residents and 48.8% of male residents as of 2014.
