= South Dagon Township =

Township of Yangon, Myanmar

South Dagon Township ဒဂုံမြို့သစ်တောင်ပိုင်း မြို့နယ်
- Township of Yangon
- South Dagon Township
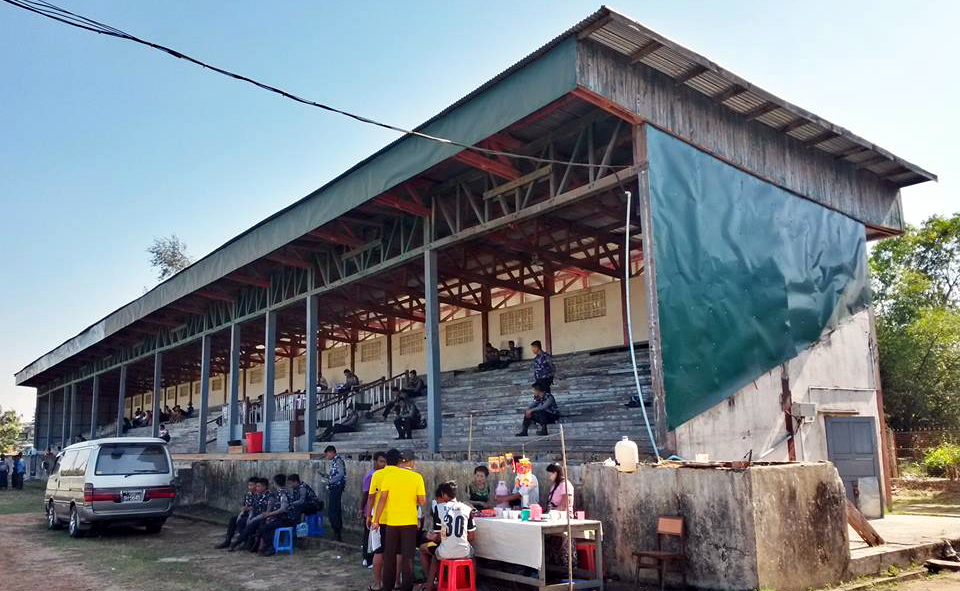
- South Dagon Football Stadium

- Location within Myanmar
- Coordinates: 16°51′0″N 96°14′0″E
- Country: Myanmar
- Region: Yangon Region
- City: Yangon
- District: Dagon Myothit District
- Settled: 1989

Area
  - Total: 79.11 km^{2} (30.545 sq mi)

Population (2014)
  - Total: 371,646
  - Density: 4,697.8/km^{2} (12,167/sq mi)
- Time zone: UTC6:30 (MST)
- Postal codes: 11431, 11432, 11433, 11434
- Area codes: 1 (mobile: 80, 99)

South Dagon Township (also South Dagon Myothit; Burmese: ဒဂုံမြို့သစ်တောင်ပိုင်း မြို့နယ် [dəɡòʊɰ̃ mjo̰ðɪʔ tàʊɰ̃báɪɰ̃ mjo̰nɛ̀]) is located in the southeastern part of Yangon, Myanmar. The township comprises 26 wards and three village tracts, and shares borders with North Dagon Township and East Dagon Township in the north, Thingangyun Township in the west across the Pazundaung Creek, the Bago River in the east, and Dagon Seikkan Township in the south. South Dagon is one of the new satellite towns founded in 1989 by the military government.

The township has 31 primary schools, seven middle schools and three high schools. It is home to the University of Culture, Yangon.

== Demographics ==
Ethnic composition of South Dagon Township
Ethnic group	Percentage
Bamar	88.11%
Foreigners	8.47%
Rakhine	1.41%
Karen	1.07%
Mon	0.54%
Chin	0.22%
Kachin	0.11%
Shan	0.06%
Kayah	0.01%
Source: 2019 GAD township report

The Bamar make up the majority of the township's population, while the Rakhine and Karen are the largest minority groups.
