= Ahlon District =

District in Yangon, Myanmar

Ahlon District အလုံခရိုင်
- District
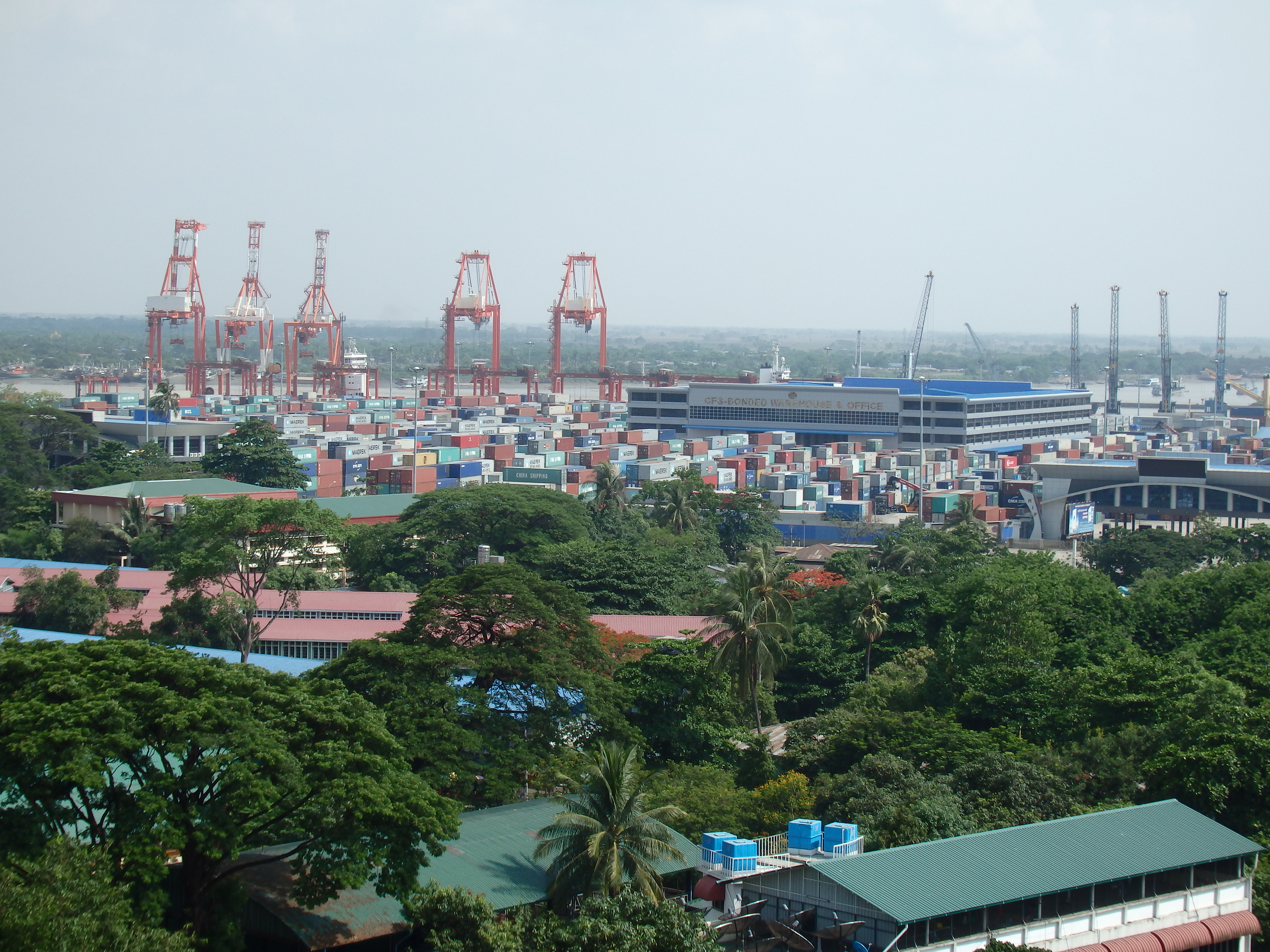
- View of the Asia World port in Ahlon

- Ahlon District in Yangon Region
- Coordinates: 16.796°N 96.125°E
- Country: Myanmar
- Region: Yangon Region
- City: Yangon
- Area code: +951

Ahlon District (Burmese: အလုံခရိုင်, AH-loan) is a district in Yangon Region, Myanmar. It is a township of Yangon and contains three townships. The district was created in 2022, being one of the new districts created from the former West Yangon District.

== Administration ==
The district has three townships- Ahlon Township, Sanchaung Township and Kyimyindaing Township. The Ahlone Township Court was upgraded to a district-level court. The district is stretches across the Yangon River as Kyimyindaing incorporates the western bank of the river as well.

In March 2024, the district's Youth Affairs Committee hosted the district's first Scout Youth graduation since the district was formed.

== Notable Sites ==
Ahlon Township has several wharves administered by the Myanmar Port Authority as well as a port operated by the company Asia World. The Asia World port was expanded over the site of the former Thiri Mingala Market, which was moved to Hlaing Township. During the reign of Badon Min in the 18th century, Kyimyindaing Township was formed as Yangon's port district.

Sanchaung Township is home to notable retail and recreational spaces including shopping malls, cinemas and the Happy World recreation center.

== See also ==
- List of districts and neighborhoods of Yangon
