= Dagon Seikkan Township =

Dagon Seikkan Township ဒဂုံဆိပ်ကမ်း မြို့နယ်
- Township of Yangon
- Dagon Seikkan Township
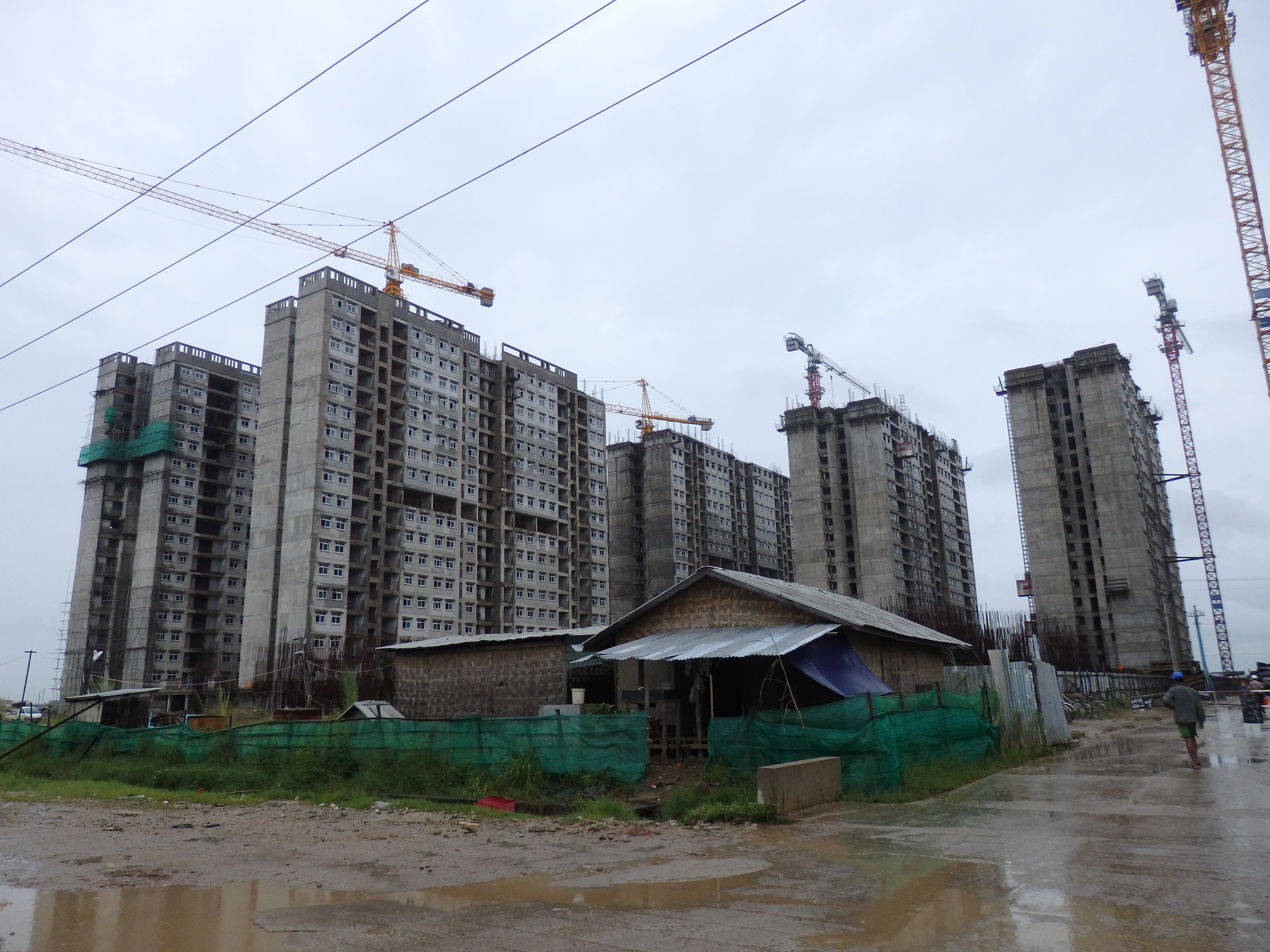
- Housing project in construction, Yadana Road

- Location within Myanmar
- Coordinates: 16°51′24″N 96°16′58″E
- Country: Myanmar
- Region: Yangon Region
- City: Yangon
- District: Dagon Myothit District

Area
  - Total: 85.4 km^{2} (33.0 sq mi)

Population (2014)
  - Total: 167,448
  - Density: 1,960/km^{2} (5,080/sq mi)
- Time zone: UTC+6:30 (MST)
- Postal codes: 11441
- Area codes: 1, (80, 99: mobile)

Dagon Seikkan Township (Burmese: ဒဂုံဆိပ်ကမ်း မြို့နယ် [dəɡòʊɰ̃ sʰeɪʔkáɰ̃ mjo̰nɛ̀]) is an urban township of Yangon, Myanmar.

== Geography ==
Dagon Seikkan Township is located in the east-central part of the city of Yangon. Dagon Seikkan Township shares borders with Hlegu Township to the north, South Dagon Township to the northwest, Thaketa Township to the southwest, and Thanlyin Township across the Bago River to the east and southeast.

Since 2007, Dagon Seikkan has been linked to Thanlyin Township by the Dagon Bridge, the second bridge to be built across the Bago River in Yangon.

== Administration ==
As of 2009, Dagon Seikkan consisted of 39 wards and five village tracts.

== Demographics ==
Satellite communities and industry moved into the township in the 1990s, growing from a rural population of under 10,000 to almost 100,000 by 2010.

== Education ==
As of 2000, the township had 10 primary schools, two middle schools and a high school. The township is in an industrial area of the city. Nationalities Youth Resource Development Degree College, Yangon is located in the township.

== Economy ==
The Samanea Yangon Market, a wholesale and retail market in Dagon Seikkan Township, was built in 2020.
