= Basic Education High School No. 4 Ahlone =

Coordinates: 16.7817°N 96.1358°E

Ahlone 4 High School အ.ထ.က. (၄) အလုံ
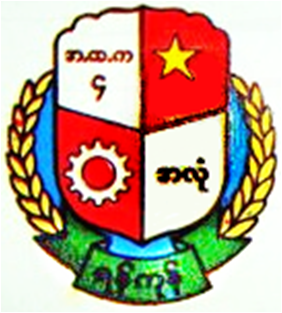

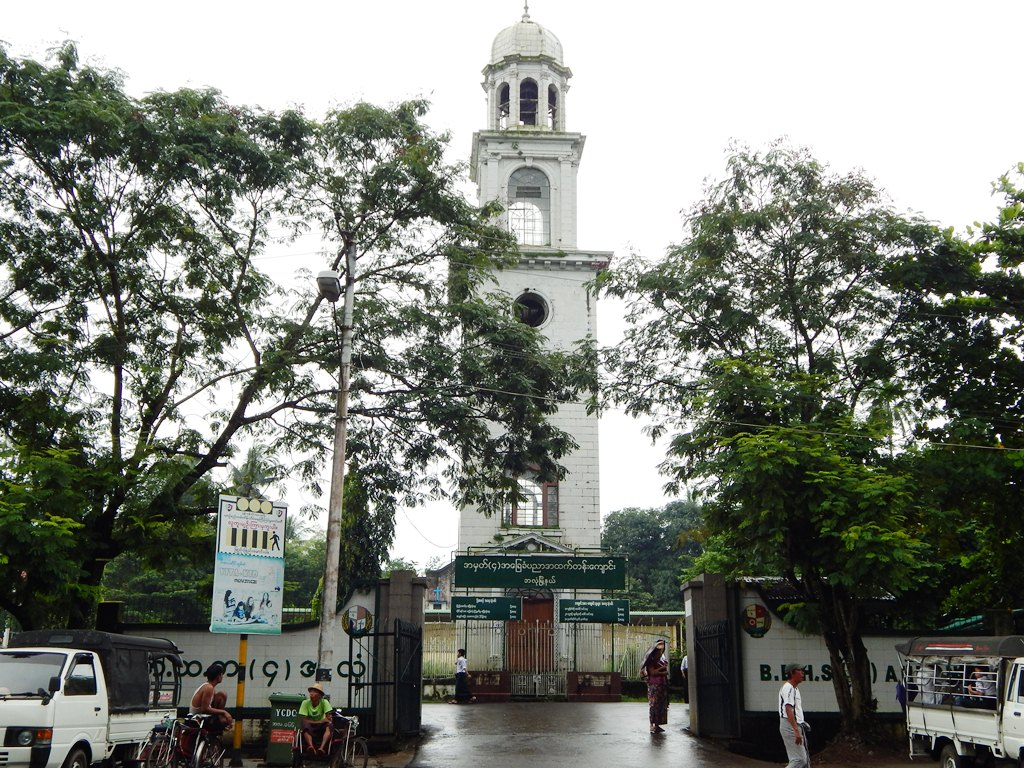
- Basic Education High School No. 4 Ahlone

Location
- 57 Lower Kyimyindaing Road, Yangon, Ahlone, Yangon Region, 11121; Myanmar

Information
- Type: Public
- Established: 1872
- School number: 4
- Grades: K-12

Designations

Yangon City Landmark

Basic Education High School No. 4 Ahlone (Burmese: အခြေခံ ပညာ အထက်တန်း ကျောင်း အမှတ် (၄) အလုံ; commonly known as Ahlone 4 High School; formerly Cushing High School) is a public high school in Yangon, Myanmar. The school is located at 57, Lower Kyeemyindaing Road, in Ahlone Township. The school's main building is a landmark protected by the city, and is listed on the Yangon City Heritage List. This school offers education from kindergarten to twelfth grade.

== History ==
Ahlone Upper 4 (Ahlone Cushion School) was a prominent school in the early Colonial Era. Cushion School had only 17 students when the American Baptist Mission established the United Christian High School on May 28, 1872. In 1894, the University of Calcutta began teaching undergraduate exams and was renamed Baptist College. In 1909, BA was promoted. The school is also known as Cushion High School after its principal, Mr. JN Cushing (1894-1906).

== Alumni ==
- Kyaw Hein: Famous actor, film director and singer who studied at Ahlone Kushin School from the sixth to the ninth grade.
- U Khin Wun is a writer who was educated in 9th grade.
