= Toe Gyaung Ga Lay railway station =

Railway station in Yangon, Myanmar

Coordinates: 16.8630°N 96.2154°E

Toe Gyaung Ga Lay railway station (Burmese: တိုးကြောင်ကလေးဘူတာ) is a railway station on the Yangon–Mandalay Railway in Yangon, Myanmar.
