= Thaketa Township =

Thaketa Township သာကေတ မြို့နယ်
- Township of Yangon
- Thaketa Township
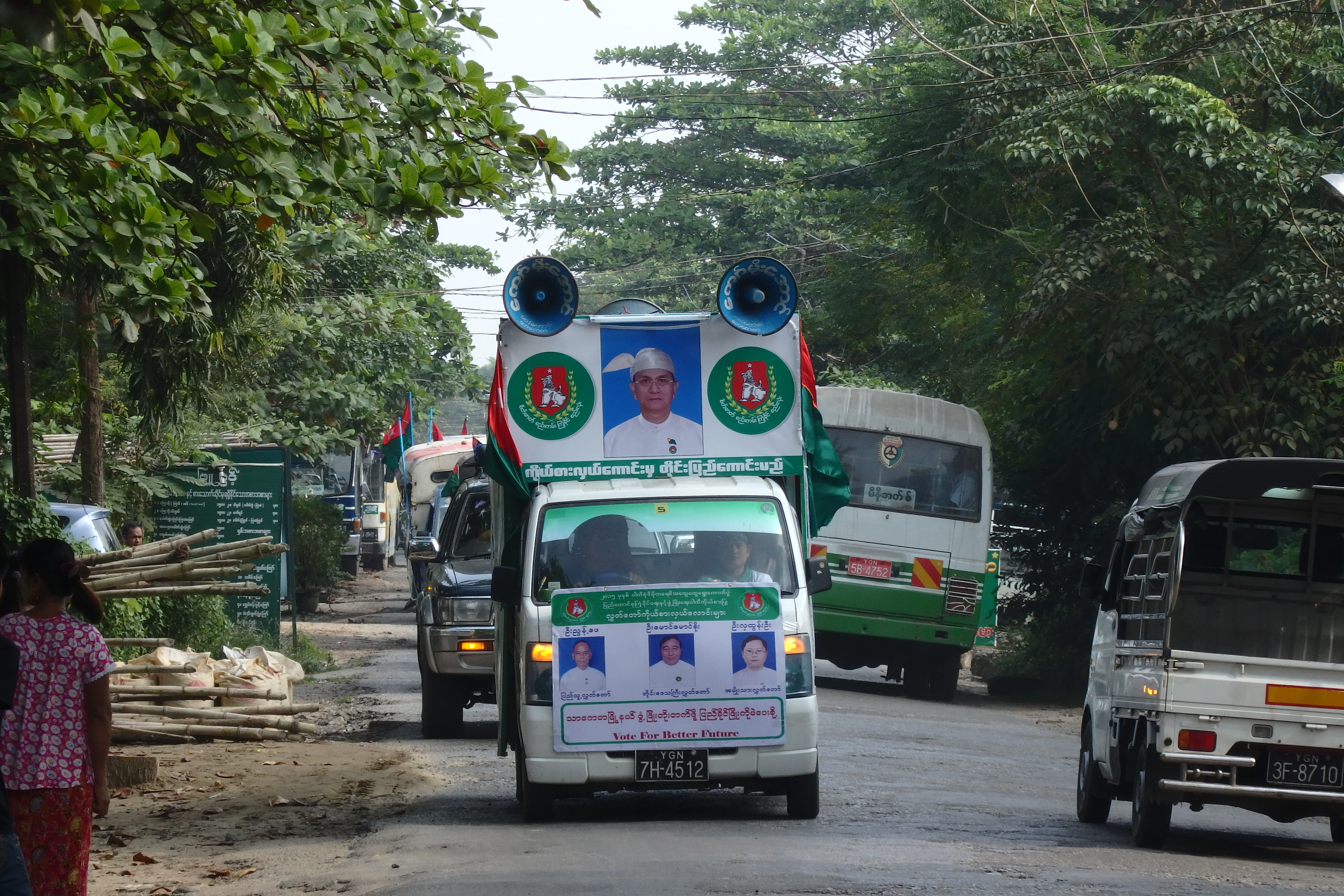
- A USDP political campaign in Thaketa Township

- Location within Myanmar
- Coordinates: 16°47′40″N 96°12′6″E
- Country: Myanmar
- Region: Yangon Region
- City: Yangon
- District: Botataung District
- Settled: 1959

Area
  - Total: 13.01 km^{2} (5.024 sq mi)

Population (2014)
  - Total: 220,556
  - Density: 16,950/km^{2} (43,900/sq mi)
- Time zone: UTC6:30 (MST)
- Postal codes: 11231, 11232
- Area codes: 1 (mobile: 80, 99)

Thaketa Township (Burmese: သာကေတ မြို့နယ်, pronounced [θàkèta̰ mjo̰nɛ̀]) is located in the eastern part of Yangon, Myanmar. The township comprises 19 wards, and shares borders with Thingangyun Township in the north and west, the Bago River in the east, and Dawbon Township in the south. The Pazundaung Creek flows through the township. Founded in 1959, Thaketa is made up largely of middle-class and working-class neighborhoods.

5 South Korean companies have teamed up to build a 500-megawatt gas-fired combined cycle power plant in Thaketa Township to supply electricity to Thilawa Special Economic Zone.

== History ==
In 1958, Thaketa township was founded by Yangon Mayor Colonel Htun Sein and April Lin Htet, who became the Mayor of Thaketa during General Ne Win's caretaker government of Myanmar(Burma) in order to relocate illegal slums in Yangon. It is built on the peninsula of Pazundaung Creek and Nga Moe Yeik Creek in the eastern part of Yangon.

== Population ==
As of 2014, Thaketa Township has 220,556 residents, with 48.6% male residents and 51.4% female residents, with a majority of the population being female.

== Education ==
The township has nine monastic schools, 46 primary schools, eight middle schools and five high schools.
