= Sanchaung Township =

Sanchaung Township စမ်းချောင်းမြို့နယ်
- Township of Yangon
- Sanchaung Township
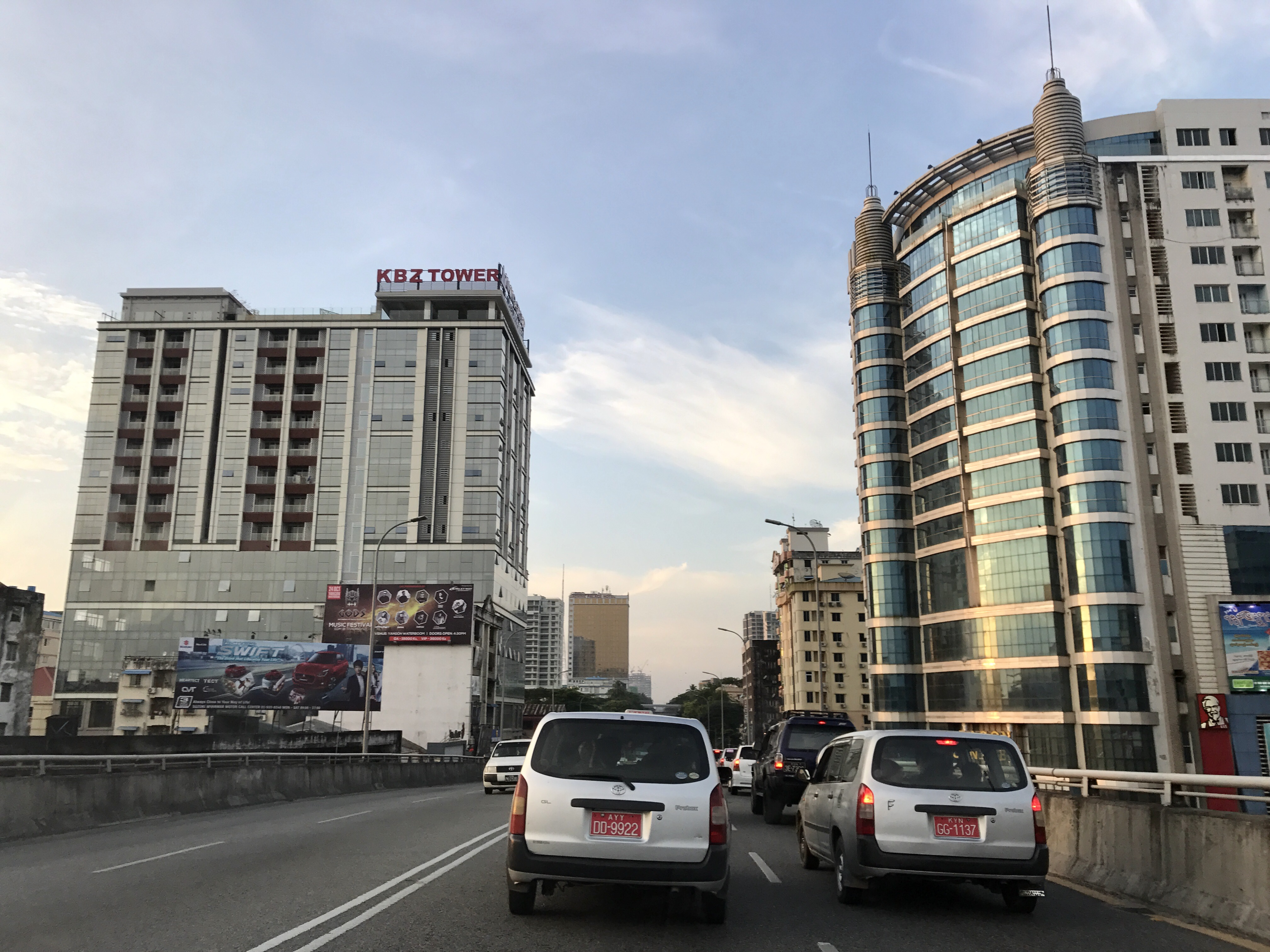
- Myaynigone Flyover

- Location within Myanmar
- Coordinates: 16°48′23″N 96°8′6″E
- Country: Myanmar
- Region: Yangon Region
- City: Yangon
- District: Ahlon District

Area
  - Total: 2.47 km^{2} (0.955 sq mi)

Population (2014)
  - Total: 99,619
  - Density: 40,300/km^{2} (104,000/sq mi)
- Time zone: UTC6:30 (MST)
- Postal codes: 11111
- Area codes: 1 (mobile: 80, 99)

Sanchaung Township (Burmese: စမ်းချောင်းမြို့နယ် [sáɰ̃dʑáʊɰ̃ mjo̰nɛ̀]) is in the north central part of Yangon. The township comprises 18 wards, and shares borders with Kamayut Township in the north, Kamayut township and Bahan Township in the east, Kyimyindaing Township in the west, and Dagon Township and Ahlon Township in the south. The township has 19 primary schools, two middle schools and four high schools. Dagon Center I and II are shopping malls inside the township, where there are many restaurants, fashion shops, and Mingalar Cinema. Other recreational spaces include Happy World recreation center and People's Park. Sanchaung is known as "Little Kachin".

== Landmarks ==
The following is a list of landmarks protected by the city in Sanchaung township.

Structure	Type	Address	Notes
Anglican Religious Training Center	Office	196 Kyundaw Lane	
BEHS 2 Sanchaung	School	29 Pyay Road	Former St. Philomena's Convent High School
Catholic Bishops' Conference of Myanmar	School	292-A Pyay Road	
Chinese Buddhist Nuns’ Temple	Temple	35 Tayok Kyaung Lane	
Kodatgyi Pagoda	Pagoda	Bagaya Lane	
Kyimyindaing Railway Station	Rail Station	292-A Pyay Road	Kyimyindaing Railway Station Lane
Kyundaw Ordination Hall	Monastery		Bagaya Lane
Myenigon Jamah Mosque	Mosque	248 Bagaya Lane	
Okkyaung Bagaya Monastery	Monastery	241 U Wisara Lane	
Sarpay Beikman	Office	361 Pyay Road	
Weluwun Monastery	Monastery	Weluwun Lane	
Zeyawadi Monastery	Monastery	Zeyawadi Lane	
Dagon Center I and II	Shopping Mall	Bagaya Lane	
Mahar Myaing Hospital	Hospital	Myay Nu Street	
