= Samanea Yangon Market =

Market in Yangon, Myanmar

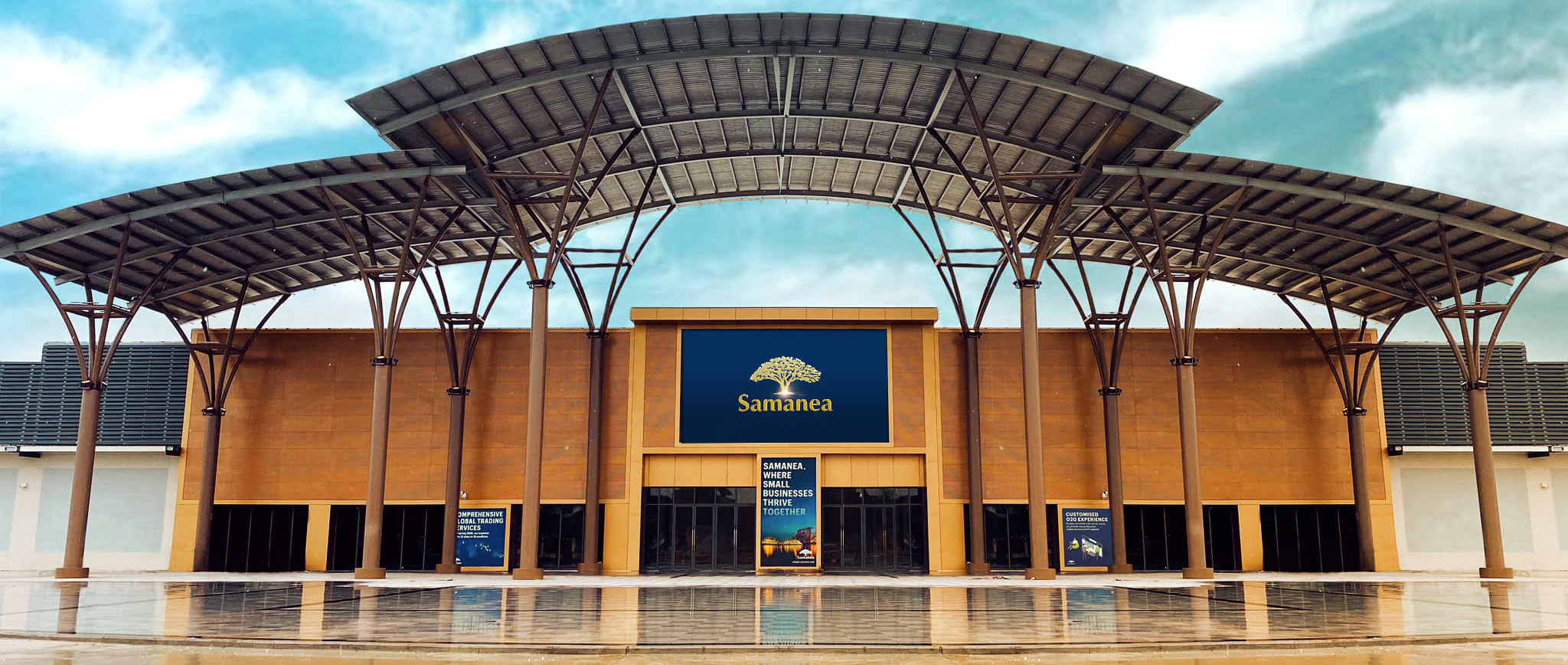
- Main entrance of Samanea Yangon Market

General information
- Type: Marketplace
- Location: Dagon Seikkan Township, Yangon, Myanmar
- Opened: November 2020; 5 years ago
- Cost: US$80,000,000+

Website
- https://yangon.samanea.com/

Samanea Yangon Market is a wholesale and retail market located between corner of Bago River Road and Yadana in Dagon Seikkan Township, Yangon, Myanmar. It is currently managed and owned by Samanea Group.

== History ==
The wholesale market was developed by Singapore-based Samanea Group and Myanmar-based EI Company Limited, with the permission of Myanmar Investment Commission (MIC) and Yangon City Development Committee (YCDC). Samanea invested more than US$80,000,000 into the project. Samanea Yangon Market is referred to as Phase I of the development, and construction began in 2019. Construction of the market completed in June 2020.

The market started trial operations in August 2020 and officially opened later in November. All 732 shops in the Samanea Yangon Market are fully leased by December 2020.

Phase II (staff apartments, boutique apartments, tenant warehouses, etc.) is set to begin construction on a nearby plot of land in 2021.

== Overview ==
Samanea Yangon Market: covering a total area of 329,000 m^{2}, with a planned gross floor area of 880,000 m^{2}, the development is planned to be carried out in four phases.

Phase I: The market opened in 2021 officially, with a total gross floor area of 48,600 m^{2} and 732 shops.

Phase II project: the main body of the market will have a planned gross floor area of 79,900 m^{2}.

Phase III Project: The main body of the market will have a total planned gross floor area of 105,000 m^{2}.

Phase IV Project: The total planned gross floor area of the main body of the market is 100,000 m^{2}.

Commercial facilities: In order to meet the requirements of customers, SAMANEA Yangon market is planning to build a number of supporting businesses: office buildings, commercial hotels, logistics warehouses, exhibition centres and other comprehensive facilities.

== Accessibility ==
Samanea Yangon is located at the intersection of Bago River Road and Yadanar Road in the new development area in Dagon Seikkan Township. It is 15 km from downtown Yangon, 16 km from Yangon Port International Terminal, and 18 km from Yangon International Airport.

== Opening Hours ==
Samanea Yangon Market is usually open from 9:00 to 18:00.

== Goods ==
At present, the first phase of the Market is occupied by a wide range of industries. The first phase of the project is occupied by a wide range of industries with rich categories, covering twenty-one major categories such as industrial electrical, hardware and tools, digital home appliances, clothing, shoes and hats, and daily-use department stores.
