= Hlaingthaya West Township =

Township in Yangon, Myanmar

Hlaingthaya (West) Township လှိုင်သာယာ (အနောက်ပိုင်း) မြို့နယ်
- Township
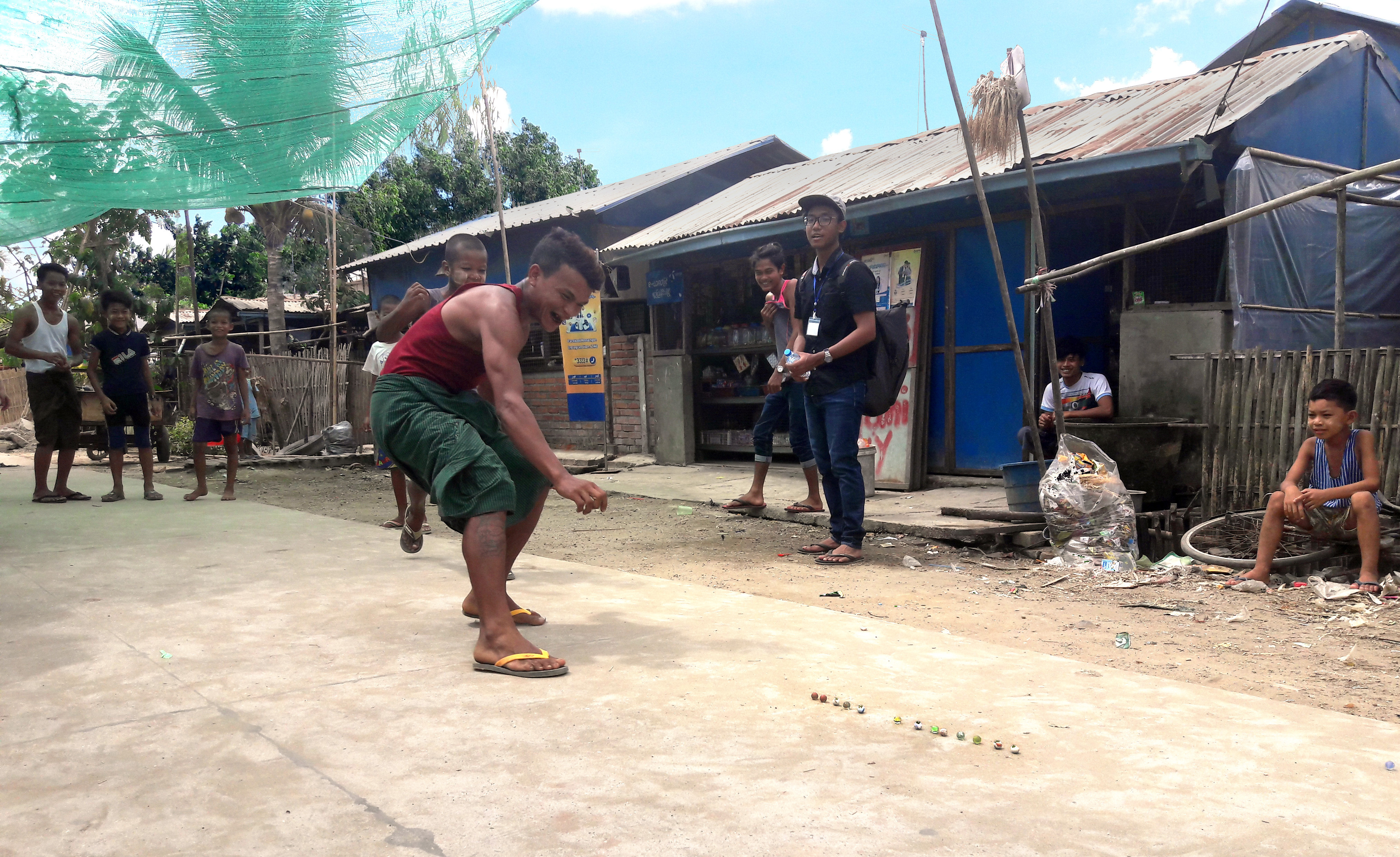
- Villagers in the Shwe Lin Ban Industrial Zone

- location in Insein District
- Coordinates: 16.900°N 96.043°E
- Country: Myanmar
- Region: Yangon Region
- City: Yangon
- District: Insein District

Area
  - Total: 12.24 sq mi (31.7 km^{2})
- Elevation: 100 ft (30 m)

Population
  - Total: 329,492
  - Ethnicities: Bamar
  - Religions: Buddhism
- Time zone: UTC+6.30 (MMT)

Hlaingthaya West township (Burmese: လှိုင်သာယာ (အနောက်ပိုင်း) မြို့နယ်) is a township in Insein District, Yangon Region, Myanmar. The township is the westernmost part of the city of Yangon and is divided into 11 urban wards and 4 village tracts, grouping a total of 9 villages. It is one of the few Yangon city townships with rural settlements. The township was split from the larger Hlaingthaya Township on 27 January 2020 according to Legal Notification 32/2020.

== Geography ==
Hlaingthaya West is still an industrial township, but contains more residential and rural areas compared to Hlaingthaya East. The Hlaingthaya urban wards numbered from 9 through 21 (except Ward 15) belong to Hlaingthaya West, mostly being residential areas. The Industrial Zones in Hlaingthaya West, as of 2023, are Shwe Lin Pan, Shwe Pinle, Shwe Thanlwin, Hlaingthaya Industrial Zone Five, Mya Sein Yaung and Anawtaw. The township also has a portion zoned for animal husbandry industrial processing next to the Kalargyi village tract.

== History ==
Hlaingthaya grew as part of an effort to resettle squatters from central Yangon following the 8888 Uprising. In 1991, authorities began establishing industrial zones and produce trading centres in the township. The largest industrial zone of Yangon, Hlaingthaya Industrial Zone, was established in 1995 and covers a land area of 567 hectares. After the 2008 Cyclone Nargis, thousands of internally displaced refugees from the Ayeyarwady delta migrants re-settled in Hlaingthaya.

During the 2021 Myanmar protests, a protest formed at the Ward 19 Administrative offices. According to the Ministry of Information, the protesters then broke in and destroyed the office leading to their arrest and imprisonment under martial law.

In August 2024, the Chinese-owned Sewell Garment factory, located in the township's Shwe Pinle Industrial Zone, caught on fire and caused significant property damage and injured firefighters and responders.
