= Kyimyindaing Township =

Kyimyindaing Township ကြည့်မြင်တိုင် မြို့နယ်
- Township of Yangon
- Kyimyindaing Township
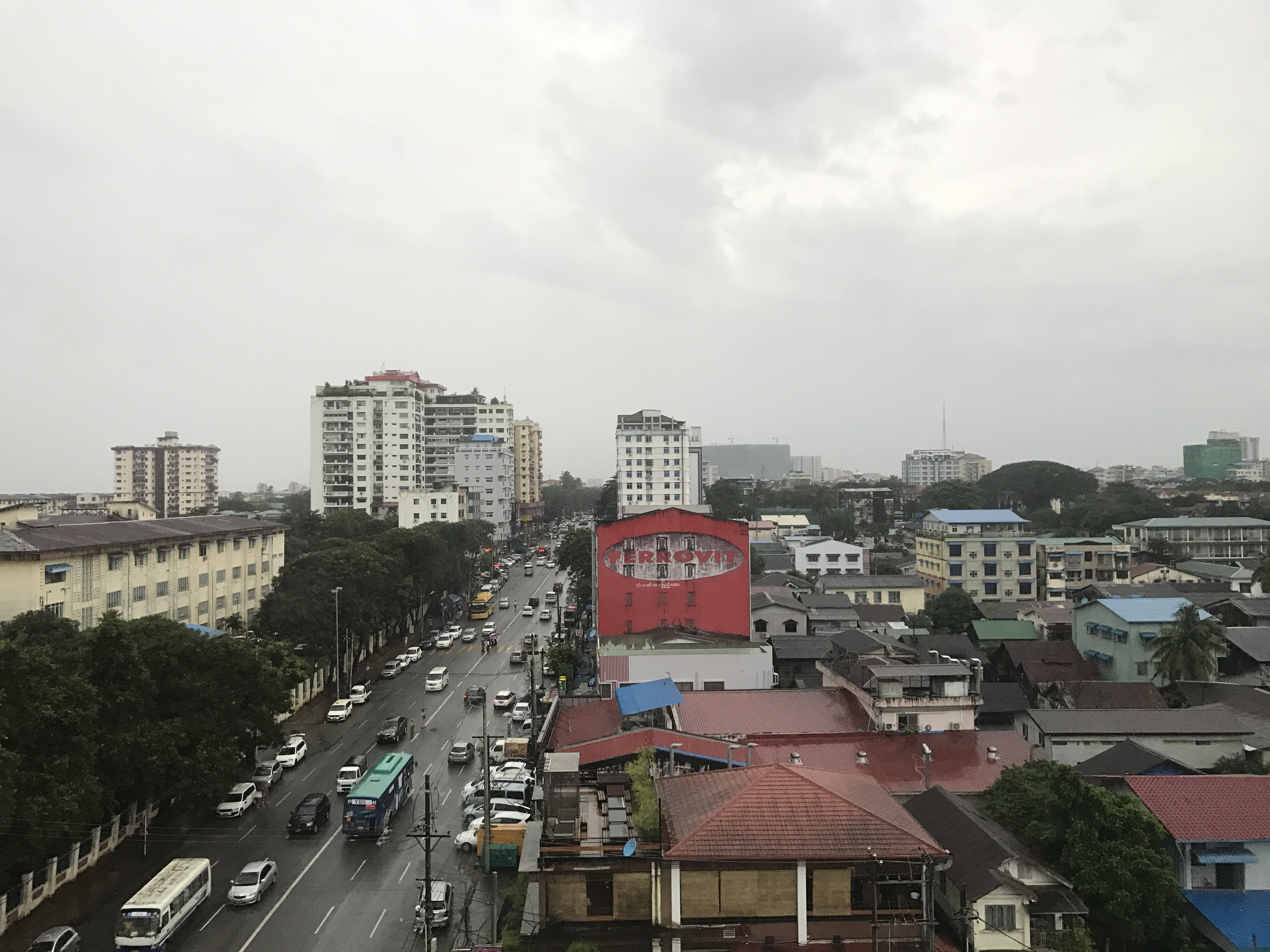
- Lower Kyimyindaing Road

- Location within Myanmar
- Coordinates: 16°48′11″N 96°7′27″E
- Country: Myanmar
- Region: Yangon Region
- City: Yangon
- District: Ahlon District

Area
  - Total: 5.6 km^{2} (2.16 sq mi)

Population (2000)
  - Total: 73,200
  - Density: 13,100/km^{2} (33,900/sq mi)
- Time zone: UTC6:30 (MST)
- Postal codes: 11101
- Area codes: 1 (mobile: 80, 99)

Kyimyindaing Township (Burmese: ကြည့်မြင်တိုင် မြို့နယ်, pronounced [tɕḭmjənàiɰ̃ mjo̰nɛ̀]; also Kyeemyindaing Township, Kyimyindine, or Kyi Myin Dine, and anglicised as Kemmendine) is located in the western part of Yangon, and shares borders with Kamayut Township in the north, the Yangon River and Twante Township in the west, Sanchaung Township in the east, and Ahlon Township in the south. It consists of 21 wards.

== Etymology ==
"Kyimyindaing" derives from the Mon language term "Kamaingdeung" (Mon: ကၟာၚ်ဍုၚ်; /kəmaiŋ dɜŋ/), which means "walled town."

== Education ==
The township has 15 primary schools, three middle schools and five high schools, and is home to the School for the Blind Kyimyindine.

== Population ==
A population of 111,514 people resides in Kyimyindaing Township, with 52.8% female and 47.2% male residents.

== Landmarks ==
The following is a list of landmarks protected by the city in Kyimyindaing township.

	Structure	Type	Address
1	Mahar Tha Kya Muni buddha stute	buddha stute	Kyaungkyi street
2	Salin Monastery Ordination Hall	Monastery	Panbingyi street
3	St. Michael's Church	Church	153 Upper Kyimyindaing Road
