= Mayangon Township =

Township of Yangon, Myanmar

Mayangon Township မရမ်းကုန်း မြို့နယ်
- Township of Yangon
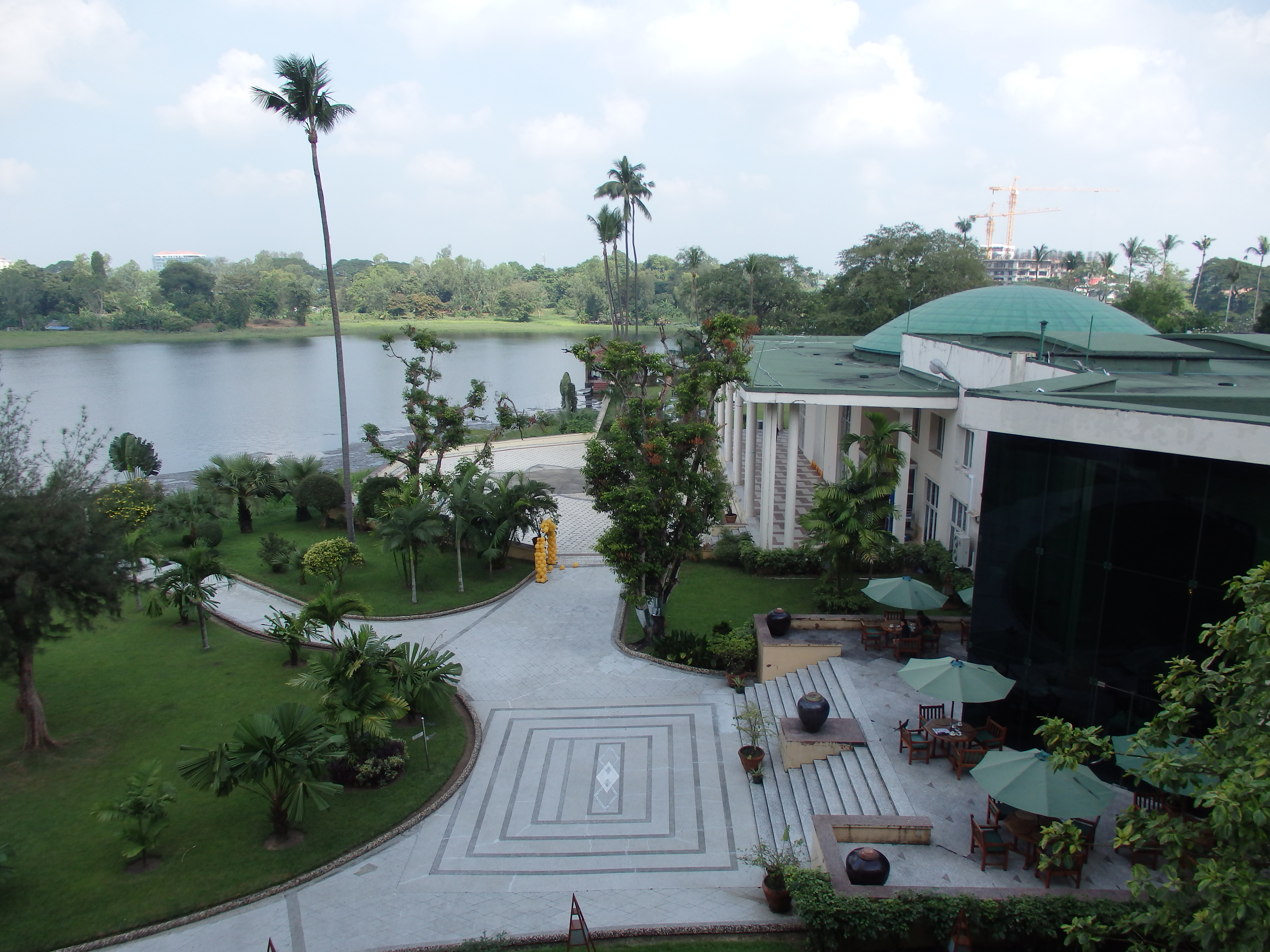
- Inya Lake Hotel, Mayangon
- Location within Myanmar
- Coordinates: 16°49′0″N 96°6′0″E
- Country: Myanmar
- Region: Yangon Region
- City: Yangon
- District: Mayangon District

Area
  - Total: 25.34 km^{2} (9.782 sq mi)

Population (2000)
  - Total: 137,000
  - Density: 5,410/km^{2} (14,000/sq mi)
- Time zone: UTC6:30 (MST)
- Postal codes: 11061, 11062, 11063
- Area codes: 1 (mobile: 80, 99)

Mayangon Township (Burmese: မရမ်းကုန်း မြို့နယ်, pronounced [məjáɰ̃ɡóʊɰ̃ mjo̰nɛ̀]) is located in the northern part of Yangon. The township comprises ten wards, and shares borders with Insein Township and Mingaladon Township in the north, North Dagon Township, North Okkalapa Township, South Okkalapa Township and Yankin Township in the east, the Hlaing river, Hlaing Township and Hlaingthaya Township in the west, and Kamayut Township and Bahan Township in the south.

The upscale neighbourhood of Parami is included in Mayangon Township.'

The Soviet-era modernist Inya Lake Hotel is located in the township, encompassing 27 acres of tropical gardens on the banks of Inya Lake. Construction of the hotel began in 1958 as a diplomatic gift from the Soviet Union during a state visit by Premier Nikita Khrushchev. The building was completed in 1962 and was intended to embody Soviet architectural style while accommodating Myanmar’s tropical climate.

== Landmarks ==
The following is a list of landmarks protected by the city in Mayangon township.

Structure	Type	Address	Notes
Aung Shwebontha Dhamma Beikman Monastery	Monastery	9 Mile Junction, Pyay Road	
Kaba Aye Pagoda	Pagoda	Kaba Aye Pagoda Road	
Kyaik Kale Pagoda	Pagoda	Yangon-Pyay Road	
Kyaik Kalo Pagoda	Pagoda	Yangon-Pyay Road	
Kyaik Waing Pagoda	Pagoda	Kyaik Waing Pagoda Road	
St Edward's Roman Catholic Church	Church	Yangon-Pyay Road	
St George's Anglican Church	Church	Yangon-Pyay Road	
Tatmadaw Orthopedic Hospital	Hospital	Yangon-Pyay Road	Former military officers training school

== Education ==
The township has 30 primary schools, seven middle schools and five high schools.
