= Ahlon Township =

Township of Yangon, Myanmar

Ahlone Township အလုံ မြို့နယ်
- Township of Yangon
- Ahlone Township
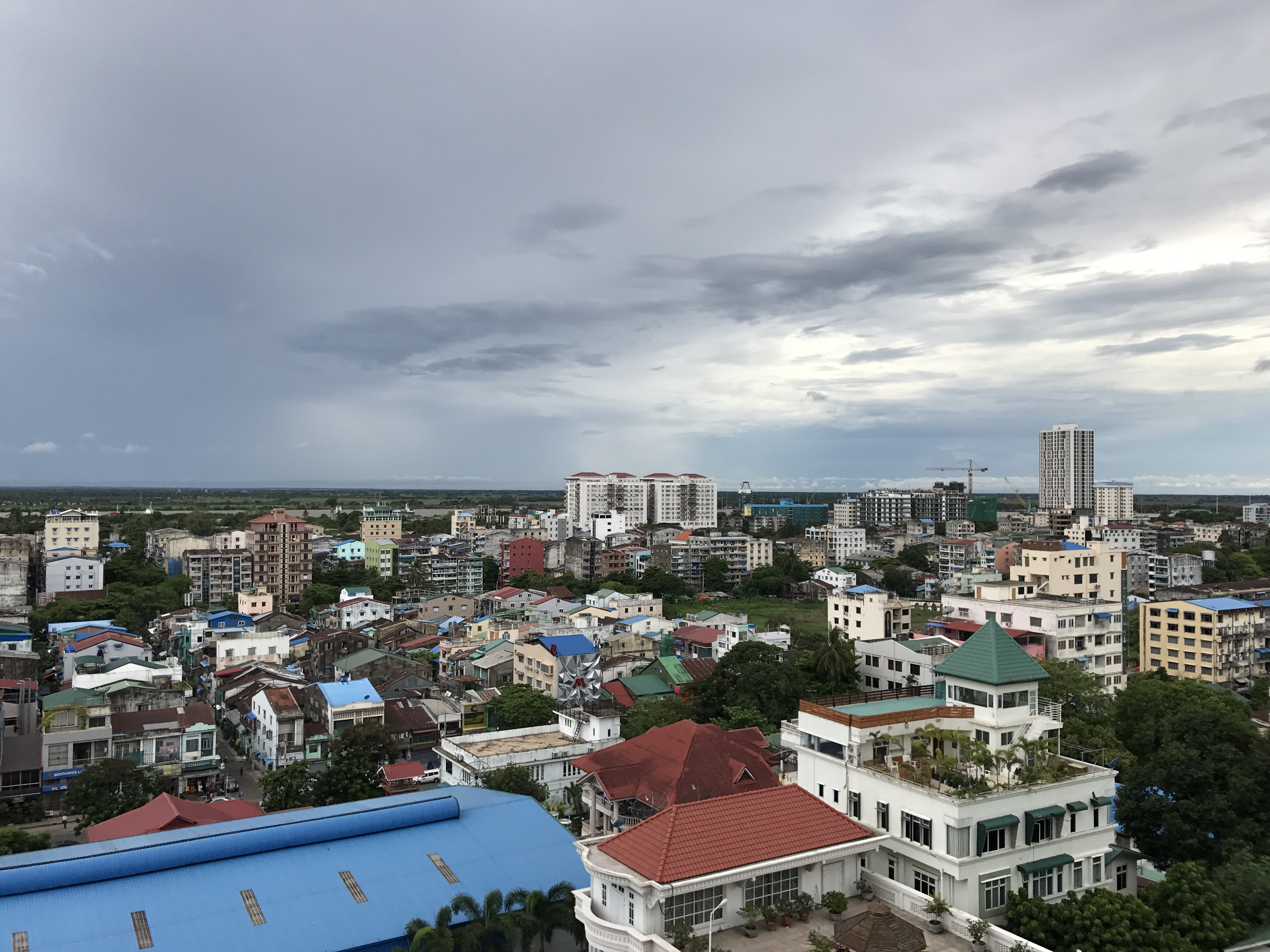

- Location within Myanmar
- Coordinates: 16°46′59″N 96°7′40″E
- Country: Myanmar
- Region: Yangon Region
- City: Yangon
- District: Ahlon District

Area
  - Total: 3.6 km^{2} (1.4 sq mi)

Population (2000)
  - Total: 41,200
  - Density: 11,000/km^{2} (29,000/sq mi)
- Time zone: UTC6:30 (MST)
- Postal codes: 11121
- Area codes: 1 (mobile: 80, 99)

Ahlone Township (Burmese: အလုံ မြို့နယ် [ʔəlòʊɰ̃ mjo̰nɛ̀]; also Ahlon Township) is located in the western part of Yangon. The township comprises eleven wards, and shares borders with Sanchaung township and Kyimyindaing township in the north, the Yangon river in the west, Dagon township in the east, and Lanmadaw township in the south.

Ahlone wharves administered by Myanmar Port Authority are located in southwestern Ahlone. Asia World has also operated a port in Ahlone since 2000. Thakin Mya Park is the major park in the township. This park, which was an abandoned park for many years, was reconstructed in 2014. Ahlone Township was once home to Thiri Mingala Market, Yangon's largest wholesale and retail market until 2010, when the Yangon City Development Committee began preparations to move the market to Hlaing Township in the suburbs, to allow for lane expansions on Strand Road and expansion of Asia World's wharves.

== Population ==
Ahlone Township had 55,482 residents as of March 2014. The majority of residents were female, accounting for 53.9% of the population, and 46.1% male.

== Education ==
Ahlone has 10 primary schools, two middle schools, and six high schools.

== Landmarks ==
The following are some high schools in Ahlone that have been established over many decades.

Structure	Type	Address	Notes
BEHS 4 Ahlone	School	57 lower kyeemyintdaing road	
BEHS 6 Ahlone	School	Min Yel Kyaw Zwar Road	
