= Inya Lake Hotel =

Hotel in Yangon, Myanmar

- အင်းလျားလိတ်ဟိုတယ်
- Main entrance in 2005, when the hotel was operated as the Dusit Inya Lake

- Location within Myanmar

General information
- Type: Hotel
- Architectural style: Soviet modernism
- Location: 37 Kaba Aye Pagoda Road, Mayangon Township, Yangon, Myanmar
- Coordinates: 16.8389°N 96.1561°E
- Construction started: 1958
- Completed: 1962; 64 years ago
- Opened: 1962

Technical details
- Floor count: 5

Design and construction
- Architects: Viktor Andreyev, Kaleriya Kislova

Website
- www.inyalakehotel.com

Inya Lake Hotel (Burmese: အင်းလျားလိတ်ဟိုတယ်) is a historic hotel located on the shore of Inya Lake in Mayangon Township, Yangon, Myanmar. The hotel covers 27 acres of tropical gardens and is known for its Soviet-era modernist architecture and lakeside location.

== History ==
The lobby in 2005

The hotel was built between 1958 and 1962 as a gift from the Soviet Union during Soviet Premier Nikita Khrushchev's visit to Myanmar. It was designed by Soviet architects Viktor Andreyev and Kaleriya Kislova, with Soviet modernist elements adapted to Myanmar's tropical climate.

The hotel has features common to Soviet sanatorium architecture, with a large entrance portico and a rooftop structure resembling a steamship funnel. An annex building at the rear of the hotel contains spaces for events and banquets, similar to Soviet-era "House of Culture" buildings.

In 1990, hotelier Adrian Zecha led renovations and upgrades to the hotel's facilities.

In 1995, Renaissance Hotels, part of Marriott International, took over management of the hotel.

In 2002, Thailand-based Dusit Hotels & Resorts assumed management of the hotel.
