= Hlaingthaya East Township =

Township in Yangon, Myanmar

Hlaingthaya (East) Township လှိုင်သာယာ (အရှေု့ပိုင်း) မြို့နယ်
- Township
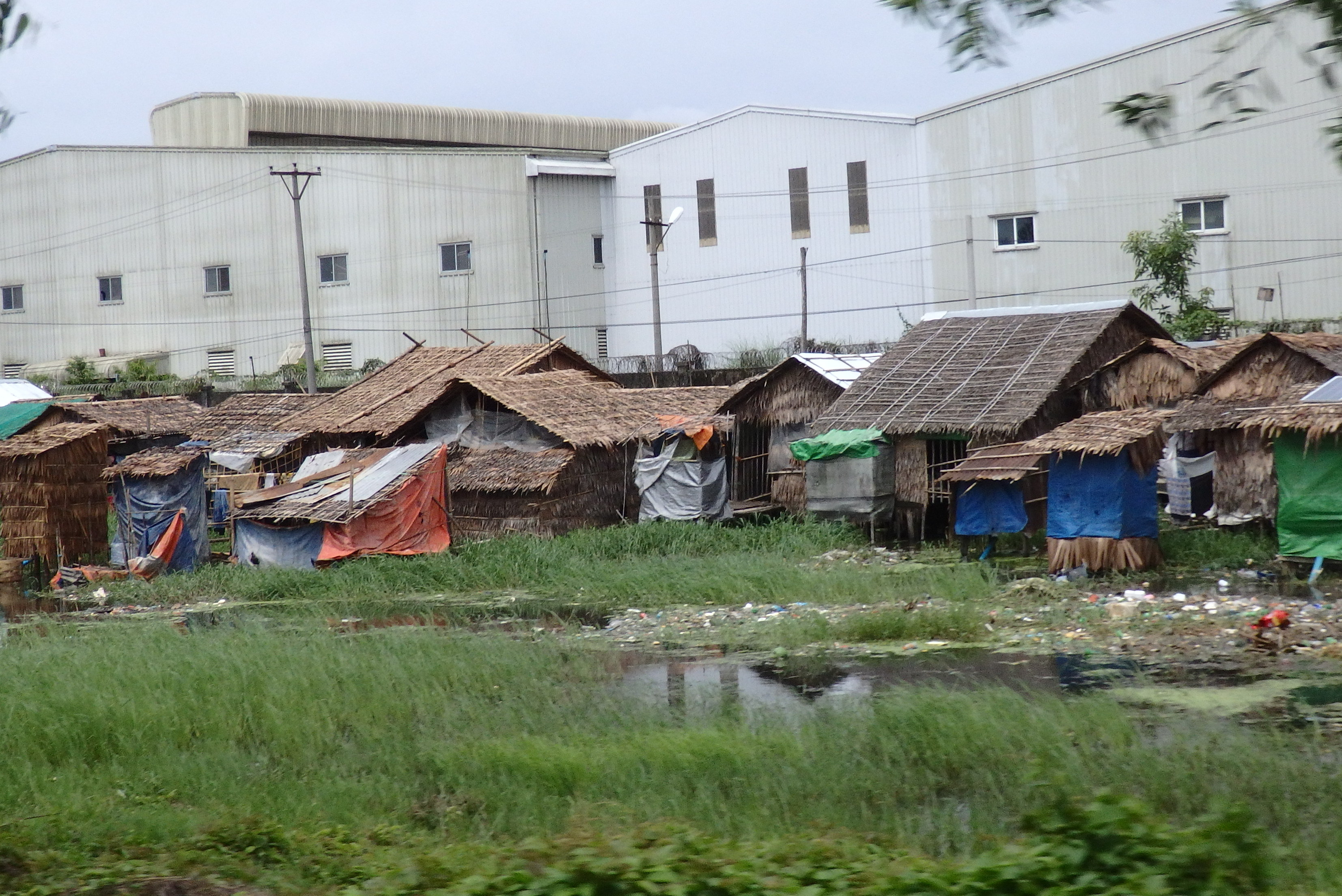
- Informal Housing next to factories, Hlaingtharya

- location in Insein District
- Coordinates: 16.865°N 96.078°E
- Country: Myanmar
- Region: Yangon Region
- City: Yangon
- District: Insein District

Area
  - Total: 12.05 sq mi (31.2 km^{2})
- Elevation: 100 ft (30 m)

Population
  - Total: 302,149
  - Ethnicities: Bamar
  - Religions: Buddhism
- Time zone: UTC+6.30 (MMT)

Hlaingthaya East township (Burmese: လှိုင်သာယာ (အရှေု့ပိုင်း) မြို့နယ်) is a township in Insein District, Yangon Region, Myanmar. The township is part of the city of Yangon and is divided into 9 urban wards and 5 village tracts grouping together a total of 9 villages. It is one of the few Yangon city townships with rural settlements. The township was split from the larger Hlaingthaya Township on 27 January 2020 according to Legal Notification 32/2020. While Hlaingthaya is a largely working class suburb, developers have also built luxury housing developments in the southeastern part of the township.

== Geography ==
Hlaingthaya East inherited the main portion of the former Hlaingthaya Township. The primarily residential Hlaingthaya urban wards numbered from 1 to 8, as well as Ward 15, were retained by Hlaingthaya East, with the township's administration centred in Ward 8 along the Hlaing River Road. The majority of Industrial Zones are located south of the Yangon-Pathein Road in the south of the township. The Industrial Zones in the township include the original Hlaingthaya Industrial Zones 1 through 4 as well as the Hlaingthaya Industrial Zone 6 and 7, on the western bank of the Hlaing River.

In 1995, FMI City, a gated housing development, was established in the central part of the township. The Pun Hlaing Golf Club, sometimes called the "Pride of Myanmar" and key golf course on the Myanmar Masters Tour, is located towards the southeastern corner near the confluence of the Pan Hlaing River and the Hlaing River. The Pun Hlaing International School and the Joint Commission-accredited Pun Hlaing Hospital are also located in the southeastern portion of the township.

== History ==
Hlaingthaya grew as part of an effort to resettle squatters from central Yangon following the 8888 Uprising. In 1991, authorities began establishing industrial zones and produce trading centres in the township. The largest industrial zone of Yangon, Hlaingthaya Industrial Zone, was established in 1995 and covers a land area of 567 hectares. After the 2008 Cyclone Nargis, thousands of internally displaced refugees from the Ayeyarwady delta migrants re-settled in Hlaingthaya.

In the aftermath of the 2021 Myanmar coup d'état, Hlaingthaya became a centre of anti-coup resistance. On 14 March 2021, the military and police forces committed the Hlaingthaya massacre, killing at least 65 civilians and marking a major escalation in the military's use of force against civilians.

In October 2021, the local government cracked down on rampant informal housing, ordering the voluntary removal of squatters from all houses near the Yangon-Pathein Road and following up with government demolition on October 28. Thousands of people faced difficulties, lacking places to move to and expressed frustration as many had been paying "rent" to nearby landowners to build their houses.
