= North Dagon Township =

Township of Yangon, Myanmar

North Dagon ဒဂုံမြို့သစ် မြောက်ပိုင်းမြို့နယ်
- Township of Yangon
- North Dagon
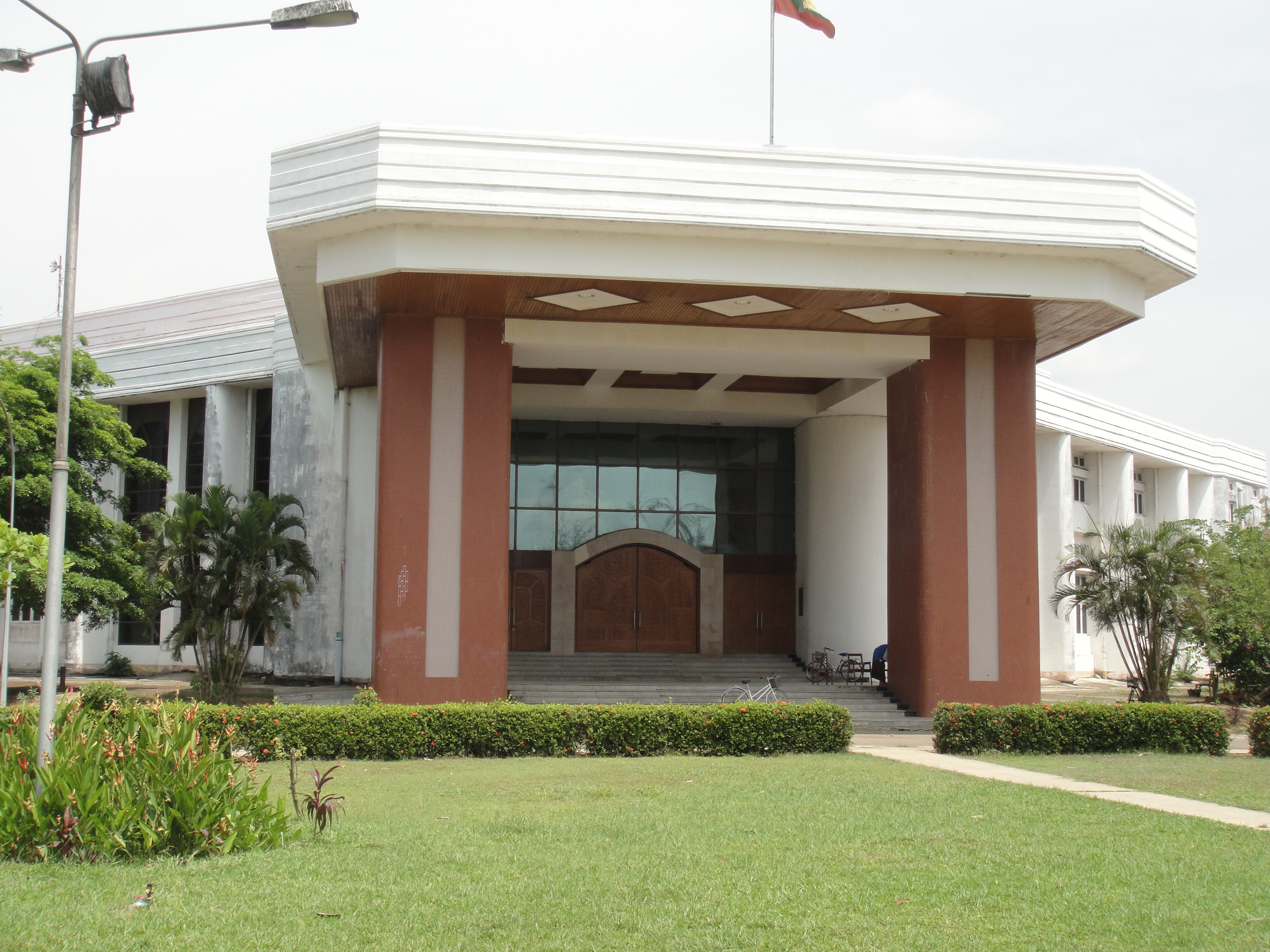
- Convocation Hall at Dagon University

- Location within Myanmar
- Coordinates: 16°53′0″N 96°10′0″E
- Country: Myanmar
- Region: Yangon Region
- City: Yangon
- District: Dagon Myothit District
- Settled: 1989

Area
  - Total: 26.28 km^{2} (10.145 sq mi)

Population (2014)
  - Total: 203,948
  - Density: 7,761.9/km^{2} (20,103/sq mi)
- Time zone: UTC6:30 (MST)
- Postal codes: 11421, 11422
- Area codes: 1 (mobile: 80, 99)

North Dagon Township (also North Dagon Myothit; Burmese: ဒဂုံမြို့သစ်မြောက်ပိုင်း မြို့နယ် [dəɡòʊɰ̃ mjo̰ðɪʔ mjaʊʔpáɪɰ̃ mjo̰nɛ̀]) is located in the eastern part of Yangon, Myanmar. The township comprises 25 wards, and shares borders with East Dagon Township in the north and east, South Okkalapa township in the west, and South Dagon township in the south. North Dagon is a relatively more developed area among the new satellite towns founded in 1989 by the military government. The realestate price is also considered highest among other new satellite townships.

The township has 24 primary schools, one middle school and four high schools. Dagon University, the largest undergraduate university in the city, is located in the central part of the township.

North Dagon is connected to the mainland Yangon across the Pazundaung Creek by the four bridges Panglong Bridge, Ba Htoo Bridge, Baeli Bridge and the Yangon Circular Railway runs a rail service between Dagon University and downtown Yangon.

== Demographics ==
Ethnic composition of North Dagon Township
Ethnic group	Percentage
Bamar	87.03%
Foreigners	7.04%
Rakhine	2.15%
Karen	1.93%
Chin	0.99%
Mon	0.30%
Shan	0.34%
Kachin	0.09%
Kayah	0.03%
Source: 2019 GAD township report

The Bamar make up the majority of the township's population, while foreigners, Rakhine and Karen are the largest minority groups.
