= Hlaingthaya Township =

Former Township of Yangon, Myanmar

Hlaingthaya Township လှိုင်သာယာမြို့နယ်: Hlinethaya; Hlaing Tharyar
- Township of Yangon
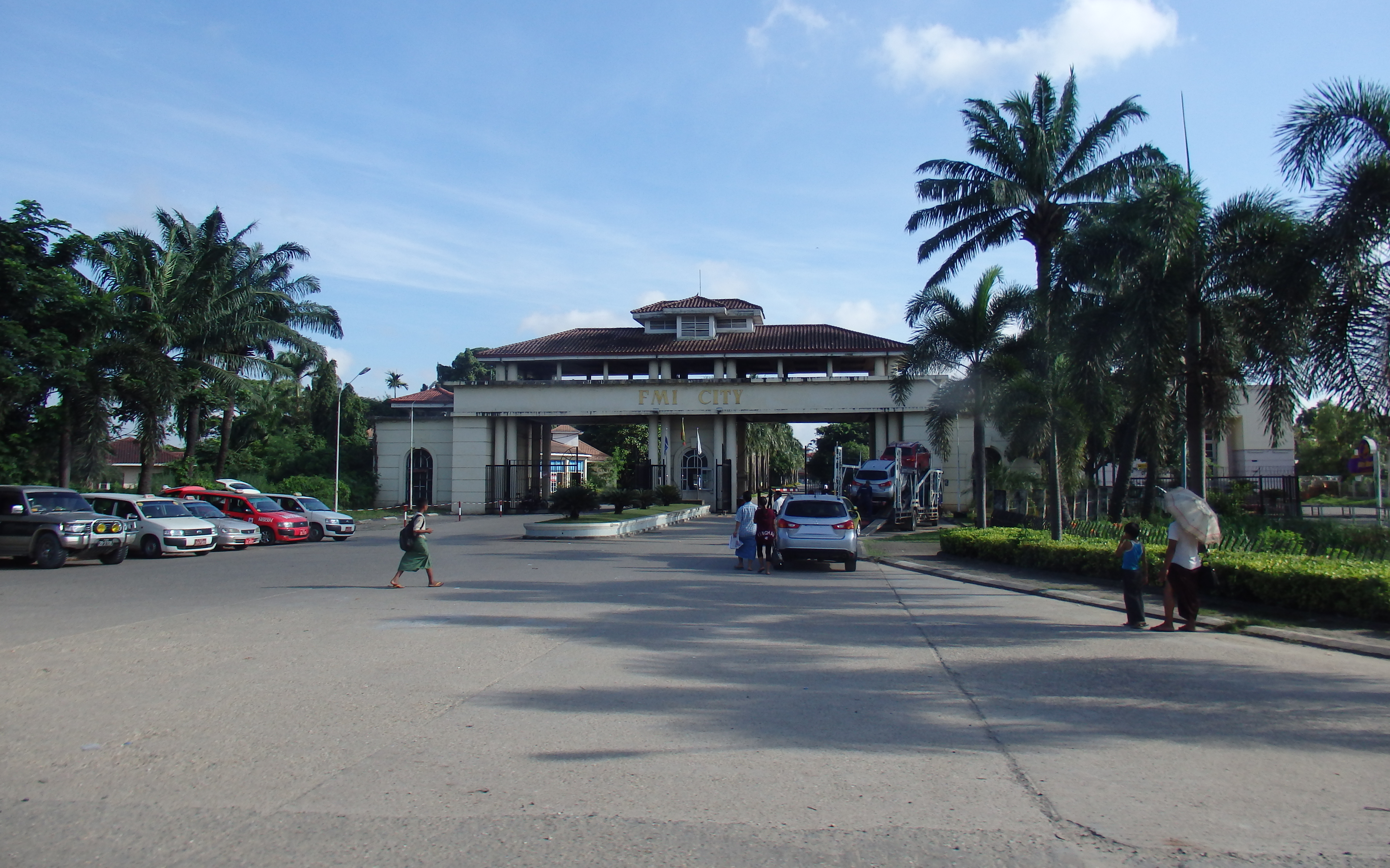
- Hlaingthaya.jpg

- Location within Myanmar
- Coordinates: 16°51′0″N 96°4′0″E
- Country: Burma (Myanmar)
- Division: Yangon
- City: Yangon
- Settled: 1985

Area
  - Total: 67.4 km^{2} (26.01 sq mi)

Population (2014)
  - Total: 687,867
  - Density: 10,210/km^{2} (26,450/sq mi)
- Time zone: UTC6:30 (MST)
- Postal codes: 11401, 11402
- Area codes: 1 (mobile: 80, 99)

Hlaingthaya Township (Burmese: လှိုင်သာယာ မြို့နယ်, pronounced [l̥àiɰ̃θàjà mjo̰nɛ̀]; also spelt Hlaing Tharyar and Hlinethaya) is located in the western part of Yangon, Myanmar. In the 2010s, it was the most populous townships in the country. The township contained 15% of Yangon's urban population and had a major industrial and factory presence. While Hlaingthaya is a largely working class suburb, developers have also built luxury housing developments in the southeastern part of the township.

In 2020, the township was split into two districts- Hlaingthaya East Township and Hlaingthaya West Township. In 2022, the two townships were split off from North Yangon District into the newly formed Insein District. Prior to these changes, the township comprised 20 wards and nine village tracts and shared borders with Htantabin Township in the north and west, Insein Township, Mayangon Township, and Hlaing Township in the east across the Yangon River, and Twante Township in the south.

== History ==
Hlaingthaya was incorporated as a township in 1989, following the 8888 Uprising, in order to resettle squatters in central Yangon. In 1991, authorities began establishing industrial zones and produce trading centres in the township. The largest industrial zone, Hlaingthaya, was established in 1995 and covers a land area of 567 hectares. In 1995, FMI City, a gated housing development, was established in the township. After the 2008 Cyclone Nargis, thousands of internally displaced refugees from the Ayeyarwady delta migrants re-settled in Hlaingthaya.

In 2019, plans to split the township into two (due to violence and over-population) were reported, although no official announcement could be found, the township had already been split in West and East constituencies for the 2020 Myanmar general election. In 2023, the General Administration Department issued documents reporting on the two townships separately stating that the townships had been separated into new townships on the 27 January 2020 according to Legal Notification 32/2020.

In the aftermath of the 2021 Myanmar coup d'état, Hlaingthaya became a centre of anti-coup resistance. On 14 March 2021, the military and police forces committed the Hlaingthaya massacre, killing at least 65 civilians and marking a major escalation in the military's use of force against civilians.

== Commerce ==
Hlaingthaya is home to a dozen industrial zones, including Hlaingthaya, Shwe Linban, and Shwe Thanlwin, which housed more than 850 factories that employed 300,000 workers as of November 2019.

== Infrastructure ==
The township is connected to other parts of Yangon across the Yangon River over the Aung Zeya Bridge and the Bayinnaung Bridge, and to TwanteTownship over the Pan Hlaing river by the Pan Hlaing Bridge.

== Demographics ==
The 2014 Myanmar Census enumerated 687,867 persons in Hlaingthaya Township. This made it the single largest township by population in the country. The population density was 10,210.6 persons per square kilometre. 53.1% of residents were female, while 56.9% were male, and the median age was 25.6 years.

In 2019, the township reportedly only had 440,949 people. This number likely excludes the large amount of residents who live in informal housing.

=== Ethnic makeup ===
Ethnic composition of Hlaingthaya Township
Ethnic group	Percentage
Bamar	93.9%
Karen	1.4%
Rakhine	1.2%
Others	3.5%
Source: 2019 GAD township report

The Bamar make up the majority of the township's population, while the Karen and Rakhine are the largest minority groups.

== Education ==
The township has 46 primary schools, 8 middle schools and 4 high schools. West Yangon Technological University also maintains a campus in Hlaingthaya.
