= Pazundaung Creek =

River in Myanmar

Coordinates: 16°46′N 96°12′E

Pazundaung Creek (Burmese: ပုဇွန်တောင်ချောင်း, known upstream as Ngamoeyeik Creek) is a stream that empties into Yangon River. The centre of Rangoon (now Yangon) was established at the confluence of Yangon River to the west and south and Pazundaung Creek to the east. The areas surrounding Pazundaung Creek have high concentrations of Burmese Indians. The Great Bell of Dhammazedi, one of the largest bells in the world, sank into the creek in 1608, when Filipe de Brito e Nicote, then governor of Syriam (now Thanlyin), removed it from the Shwedagon Pagoda to melt it down and make it into cannons.
