= Yangon Region Government =

- ရန်ကုန်တိုင်းဒေသကြီးအစိုးရအဖွဲ့
- Seal of Yangon Region

Government overview
- Formed: 19 September 1988
- Jurisdiction: Devolved assembly-independent under a Military junta
- Headquarters: Ahlone Road, Dagon Township, Yangon
- Government executive: Hla Soe, Chief Minister
- Parent department: Government of Myanmar
- Website: http://www.yangon.gov.mm

Yangon Region Government is the government of Yangon Region, responsible for its administration. The region government is led by the Chief Minister of Yangon Region. The current Chief Minister is Hla Soe.

== Hla Soe's Yangon Region Administration Council (1 February 2021 – 1 August 2021) ==
According to the Coup D'état on 1 February 2021, the former cabinet was dissolved and formed a new council by the Myanmar Military also known as Yangon Region Administrative Council.

No.	Name	Portfolio	Political Party
(1)	Hla Soe	Chief Minister	Union Solidarity and Development Party
(2)	Colonel; Win Tint	Minister of Security and Border Affairs	Myanmar Military
(3)	Bo Htay	Minister of Municipality Affairs	Independent
(4)	Zaw Win	Minister of Natural Resources	Independent
(5)	Lieutenant Colonel; Myo Min Htike	Minister of Transportation	Myanmar Military
(6)	Aung Than U	Minister of Economics	Union Solidarity and Development Party
(7)	Aung Win Thein	Minister of Social Affairs	Union Solidarity and Development Party
(8)	Htay Aung	Minister of Immigration and Human Resources Development	Independent
(9)	Saw Jacob Htoo	Minister of Ethnicities Affairs	Kayin People's Party

== Phyo Min Thein's Yangon Region Cabinet (1 April 2016 – 31 January 2021) ==
According to the result of the 2015 Myanmar General Election, National League for Democracy Party won with a landslide victory and formed a cabinet .

Although the term of the cabinet is 5 years, this cabinet could only serve for 4 years & 307 days due to the Coup D'état on 1 February 2021.

No.	Name	Portfolio	Political Party
(1)	Phyo Min Thein	Chief Minister	National League for Democracy
(2)	Colonel; Win Tint	Minister of Security and Border Affairs	Myanmar Military
(3)	Maung Maung Soe	Minister of Municipality Affairs	Independent
(4)	Han Tun	Minister of Agriculture, Livestock and Forestry	Independent
(5)	Nilar Kyaw	Minister of Electricity, Industry and Transportation	Independent
(6)	Ye Min Oo	Minister of Planning and Finance	National League for Democracy
(7)	Naing Ngan Lin	Minister of Social Affairs	National League for Democracy
(8)	Moe Moe Suu Kyi	Minister of Immigration and Human Resources Development	National League for Democracy
(9)	Naw Pan Thin Zar Myo	Minister of Karen Ethnic Affairs	National League for Democracy
(10)	Zaw Aye Maung	Minister of Arakan Ethnic Affairs	Arakan National Party

== Myint Swe's Yangon Region Cabinet (1 April 2011 – 31 March 2016) ==
According to the result of the 2010 Myanmar General Election, Union Solidarity and Development Party(the military proxy party formed by the former dictators)won and formed the cabinet. This cabinet had fully served for 5 years .

No.	Name	Portfolio	Political Party
(1)	Lieutenant General; Myint Swe	Chief Minister	Union Solidarity and Development Party
(2)	Colonel; Tin Win	Minister of Security and Border Affairs	Myanmar Military
(3)	Brigadier General; Hla Myint	Minister of Municipality Affairs	Union Solidarity and Development Party
(4)	Soe Min	Minister of Agriculture and Livestock	Union Solidarity and Development Party
(5)	Kyaw Soe	Minister of Forestry	Union Solidarity and Development Party
(6)	Nyan Tun Oo	Minister of Electricity and Industry	Union Solidarity and Development Party
(7)	Colonel; Aung Khin	Minister of Transportation	National Unity Party
(8)	Than Myint	Minister of Planning	Union Solidarity and Development Party
(9)	San San Nwe	Minister of Finance	Union Solidarity and Development Party
(10)	Dr; Myint Thein	Minister of Social Affairs	Union Solidarity and Development Party
(11)	Saw Tun Aung Myint	Minister of Karen Ethnic Affairs	Kayin People's Party
(12)	Zaw Aye Maung	Minister of Arakan Ethnic Affairs	Arakan National Party

== Myint Swe's Yangon Division Peace & Development Council (16 April 2001 – 31 March 2011) ==
No.	Name	Portfolio	Political Party
(1)	Lieutenant General; Myint Swe	Council Chairman	Myanmar Military
(1)	Lieutenant General; Myint Swe	Regional Military Commander-in-Chief	Myanmar Military
(2)		Council Secretary	Myanmar Military
(3)	Brigadier General; Aung Thein Lin	Mayor of Yangon	Myanmar Military

== Khin Maung Than's Yangon Division Peace & Development Council (15 November 1997 – 15 April 2001) ==
No.	Name	Portfolio	Political Party
(1)	Major General; Khin Maung Than	Council Chairman	Myanmar Military
(1)	Major General; Khin Maung Than	Regional Military Commander-in-Chief	Myanmar Military
(2)		Council Secretary	Myanmar Military
(3)	Colonel; Ko Lay	Mayor of Yangon	Myanmar Military

== Myo Nyunt's Yangon Division Law & Order Restoration Council (19 September 1988 – 14 November 1997) ==
No.	Name	Portfolio	Political Party
(1)	Lieutenant General; Myo Nyunt	Council Chairman	Myanmar Military
(1)	Lieutenant General; Myo Nyunt	Regional Military Commander-in-Chief	Myanmar Military
(2)		Council Secretary	Myanmar Military
(3)	Colonel; Ko Lay	Mayor of Yangon	Myanmar Military
