= Omni Focus =

Burmese bus company

Omni Focus General Services Public Co., Ltd
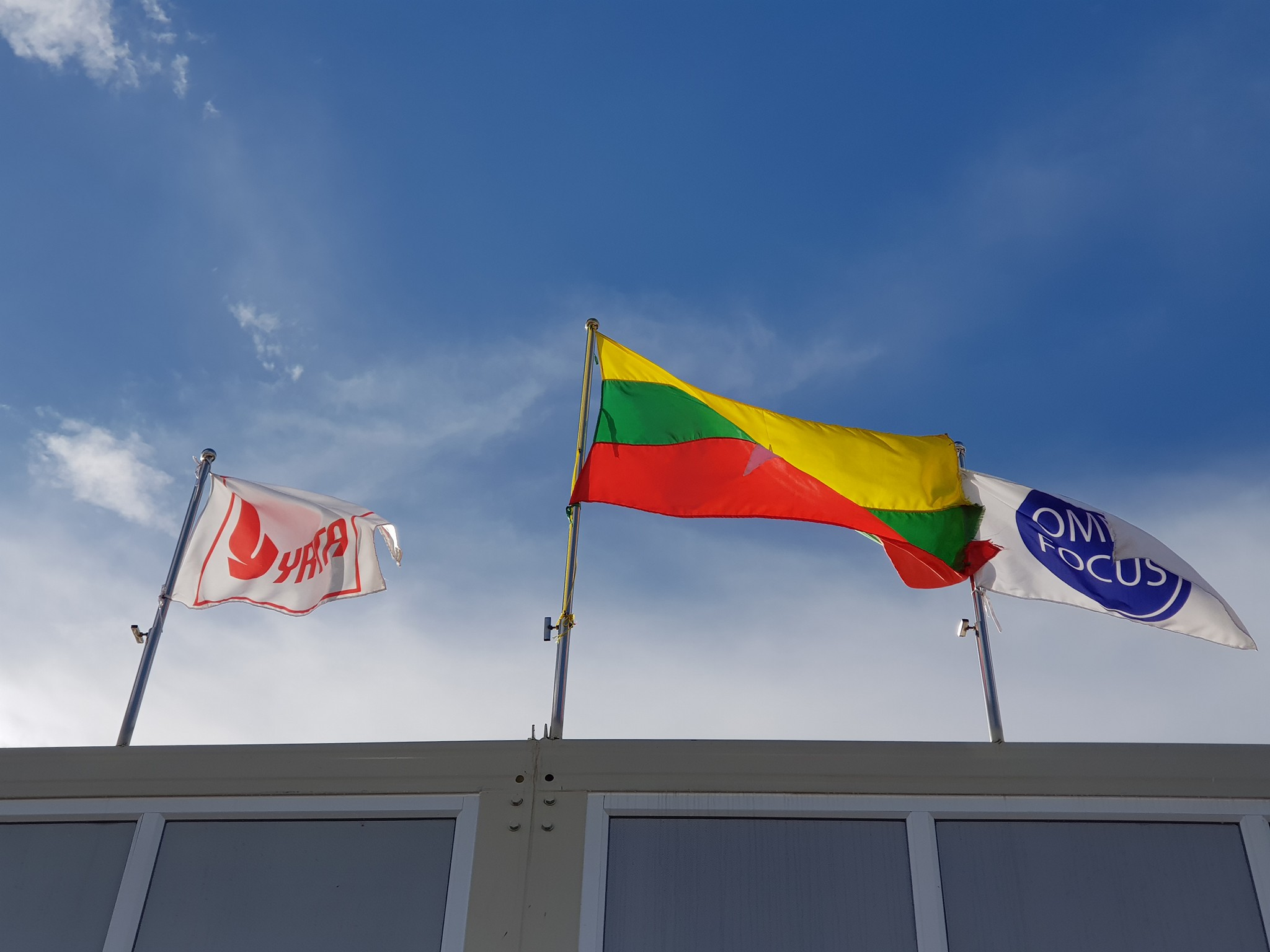
- Head Office Located in Hlaingthaya Township

Overview
- Locale: Hlaingthaya Township, Yangon
- Number of lines: Currently 7 lines
- Line number: YBS - 20, 56, 82, 83, 98, 99, Airport Shuttle.
- Chief executive: Kyaw Ne Win
- Headquarters: Hlaing Township

Operation
- Began operation: 1, January, 2017
- Number of vehicles: 500

Omni Focus is a Bus Service Company, that runs under the authority of YRTA since 1 January 2017. Omni Focus is currently running 7 bus lines, YBS - 20, YBS - 56, YBS - 82, YBS - 83, YBS - 98, YBS - 99 and Airport Shuttle. Airport Shuttle is Running from Yangon International Airport to Sule Pagoda with the Shuttling system. All the Bus Lines from Omni Focus are currently running with the 24 hours service in Yangon.

== Controversies ==
In March 2019, Omni Focus was sued by AYA Bank for failing to repay hire-purchase loans obtained to acquire buses. The company, and two of its affiliates—Central Yangon Network Company and Keen Support Company—took out a loan of 56 billion kyats (US$36.8 million) from AYA Bank in 2017 to buy 500 new buses to be operated by Yangon Bus Service (YBS). The loan was sought at the recommendation of Yangon Chief Minister Phyo Min Thein.

== Gallery ==
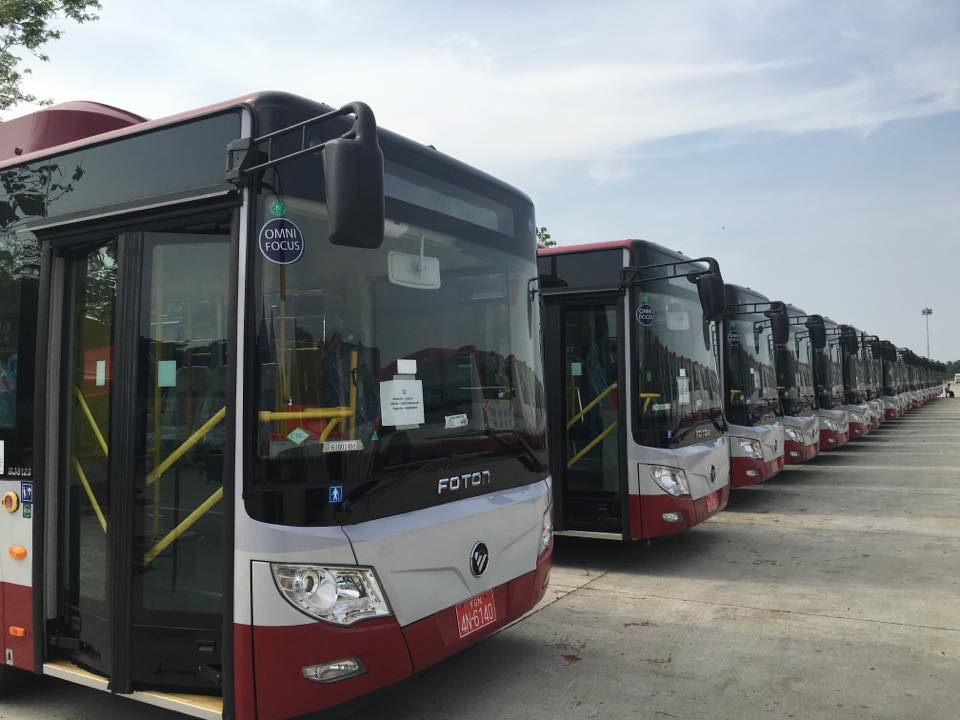
The Buses stop at the Omni Focus's Ground

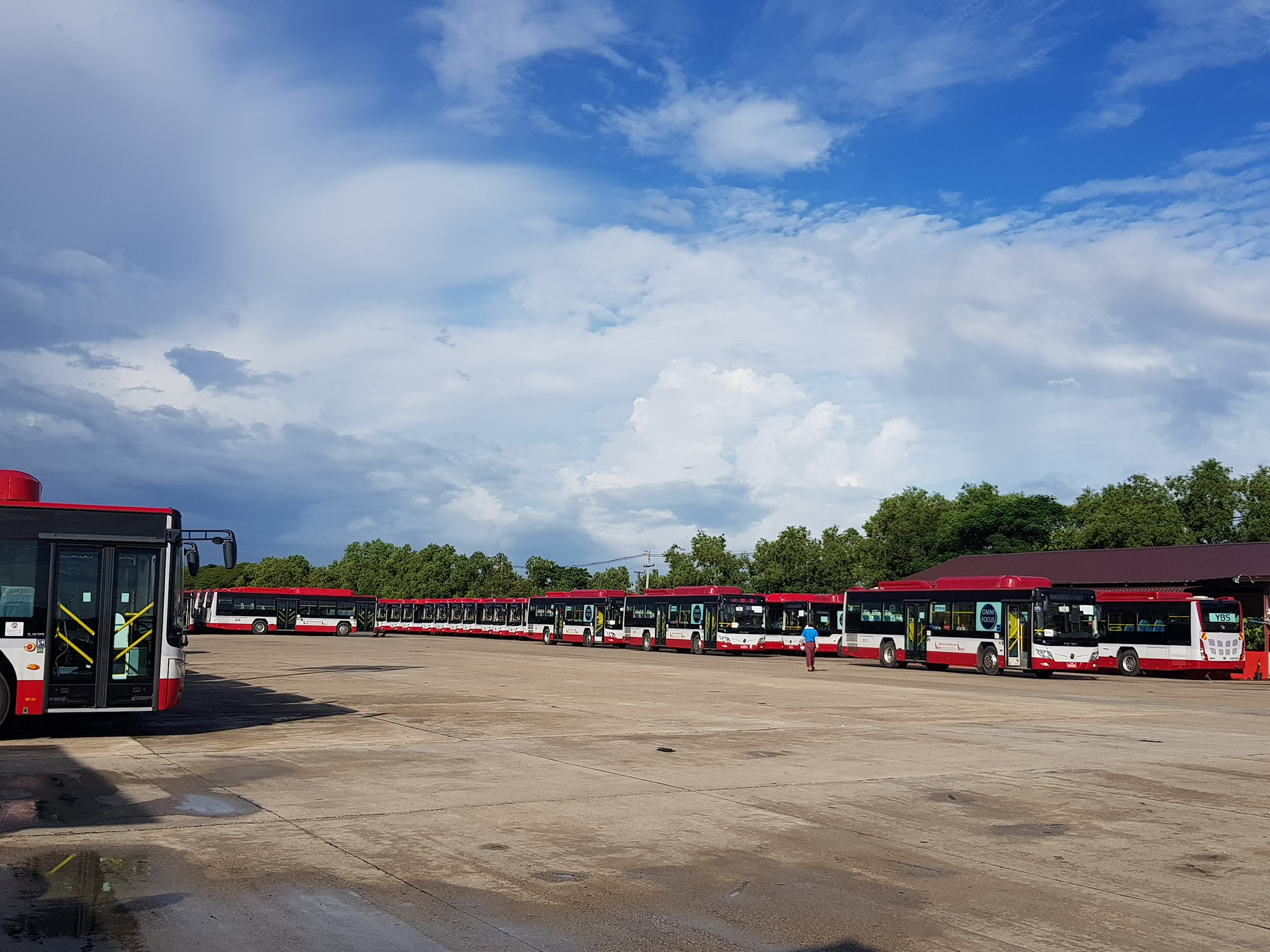
The Buses stop at the Omni Focus's Ground

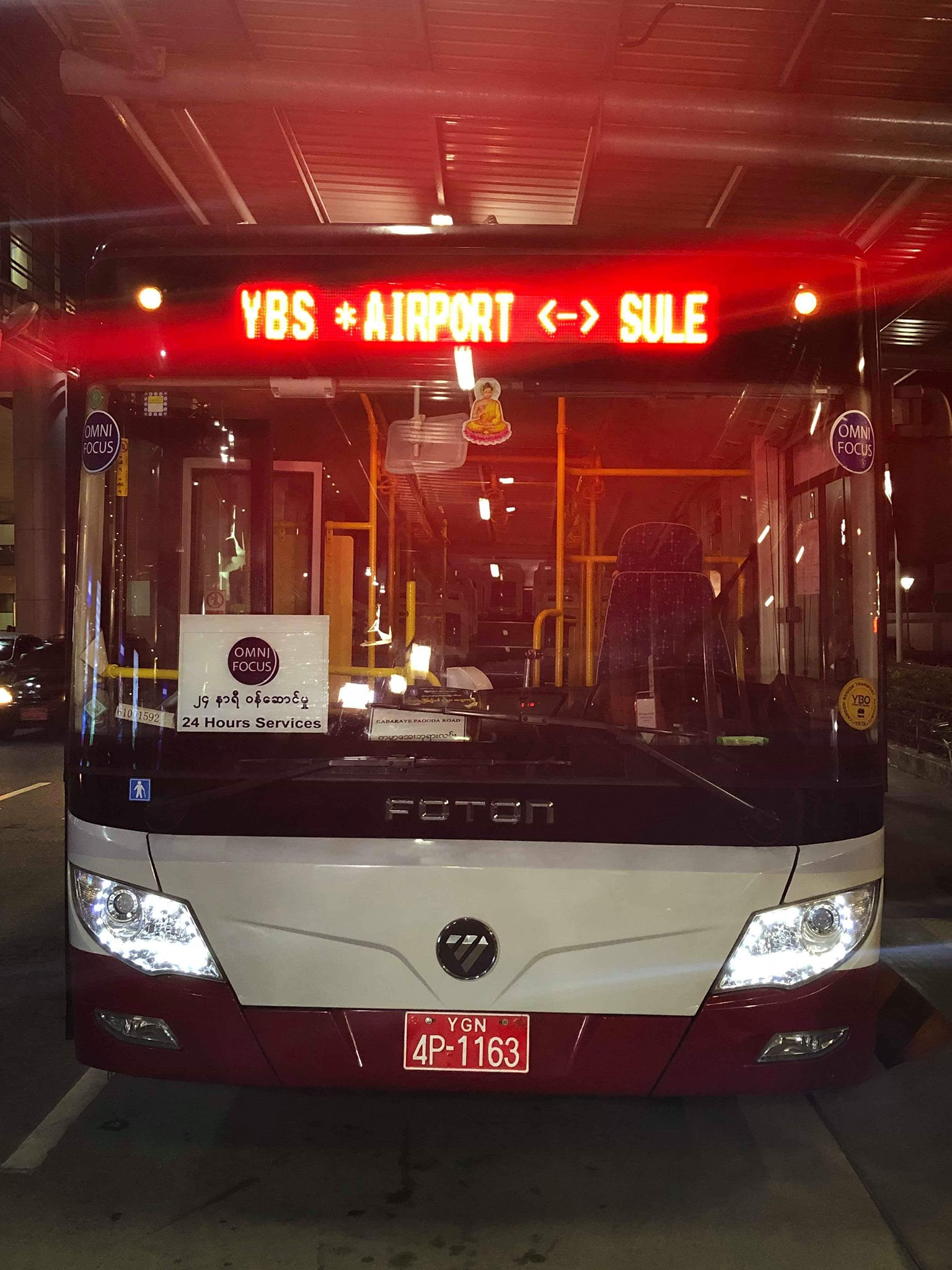
24 Hours Service started at the Airport-Shuttle
