= New Yangon City =

- Interactive map of New Yangon City
- Location: Yangon Region, Myanmar
- Coordinates: 16.794477269257253°N 96.0698285999283°E
- Website: nydc.com.mm

Companies
- Developer: New Yangon Development Company

Technical details
- Size: 4,745 hectares (11,730 acres)

New Yangon City Project (Burmese: ရန်ကုန်မြို့သစ်စီမံကိန်း; abbreviated NYDC) is a major urban planning project was proposed by the Yangon Region Government, led by chief minister Phyo Min Thein in 2019. Under the process, the initial development proposal drawn up by the Beijing-based China Communications Construction Co. Ltd. (CCCC).

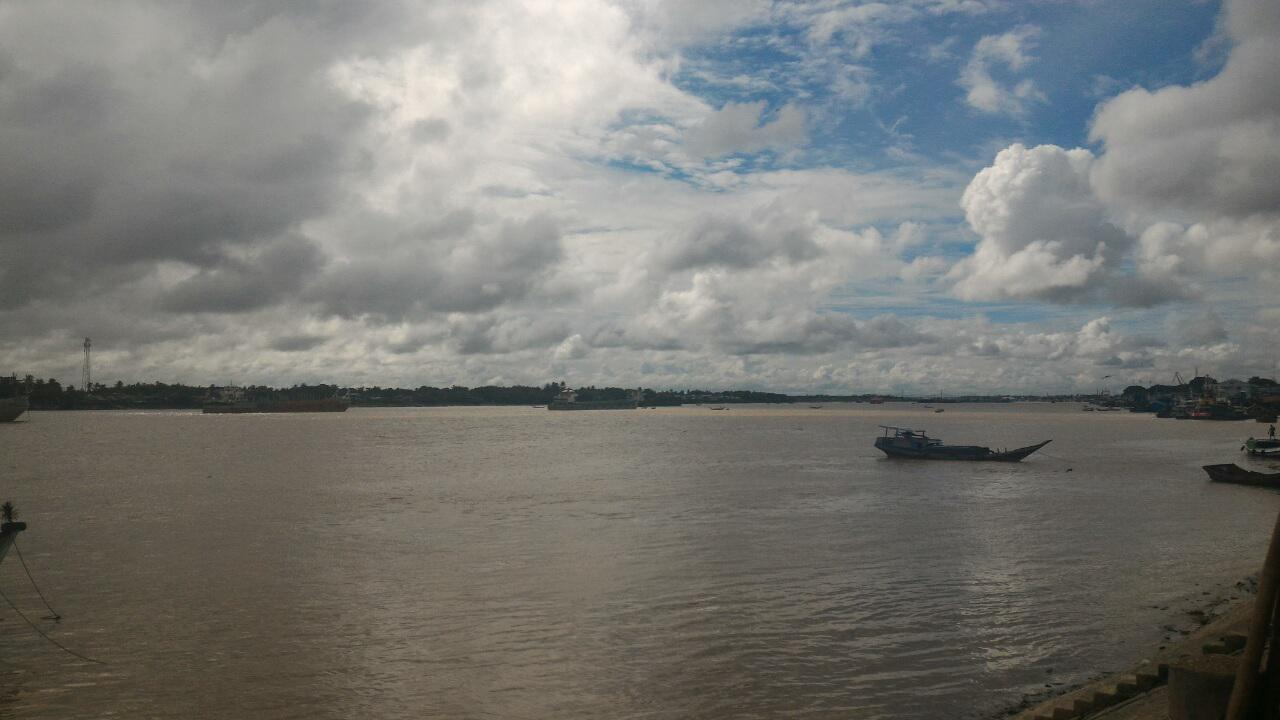
View from Kyimyindaing Township

In 2020, the Myanmar government has invited investors to submit competing proposals against a Chinese company’s proposal to develop an industrial park and related infrastructure for the New Yangon City project. The Myanmar government’s Swiss Challenge Tender Committee announced that expressions of interest by companies wishing to compete in the “Swiss challenge” tender process to implement the project would be overseen by the German consulting firm Roland Berger. In its announcement, the committee gave interested companies just seven days to submit their expression of interest (EOI), setting a final deadline for submissions of 3:00 pm, on 22 October 2020.

The Myanmar government then received 16 proposals from nine countries, including Japan, Singapore, Italy, Spain and France, to compete against a Chinese company’s proposal for the New Yangon City project. Shortlisted applicants will receive information within seven working days after the deadline for EOI submissions. The information will include details on the industrial park, including the scope of infrastructure work, documents to be submitted and a timeframe for the tender process, according to the committee.

The committee said CCCC has 45 working days to match the winning challenger.

== Proposed development ==
The proposed area includes 4,745 hectares (11,730 acres) between the Hlaingthaya-Twante motorway and Seikkyi Kanaungto Township. Phase 1, slated for completion by 2020, will include the construction of five villages and townships, two bridges, 26 kilometres (16 mi) main roads, industrial zones, power plants, power distribution facilities and water and sewage treatment plants. Phase 2 will encompass development projects from Dala Township to the Gulf of Martaban. The land is located in a flood-prone area, due to its low-lying elevation, with a maximum elevation of 5 metres (16 ft), vulnerable to cyclonic surges like Cyclone Nargis. The slated areas were previously excluded from development consideration in the 1980s and 1990s by the Ministry of Construction for this reason.

== Ownership ==
The Yangon Region government incorporated a company, the New Yangon Development Company Limited (NYDC), under the Special Companies Act in 31 March 2018 to undertake this development project as a public–private partnership. The Yangon Region government has contributed 10 billion MMK (approximately US$6.5 million) as initial capital toward the company. In April 2018, the NYDC signed a US$1.5 billion framework agreement with the Chinese-owned China Communications Construction Company (CCCC) to build the new city's infrastructure, in exchange for CCCC's right to use of 28 square kilometres (11 sq mi) in the city.

== Controversies ==
The project has been criticised lack of transparency. In August 2014, Yangon Chief Minister Myint Swe (general), launched a project to develop a US$8 billion, 30,000-acre new city west of Yangon. The project was controversially awarded to an unknown firm, Myanmar Saytanar Myothit Public Company, without a public tender. The project was later tabled due to public anger over controversial ties between the firm and Myint Swe.

The project was later put out to tender, and in January 2016 three companies were chosen to implement a smaller version of the new city project, spread over almost 12,000 acres.

The Yangon Region Parliament previously suspended the proposal. The land prices in neighbouring areas Dala, Twante and Seikkyi Kanaungto had skyrocketed. After 10 months of suspension, it was later approved in June 2015. The project include five river-crossing bridges and city infrastructures. The project is not part of the Master Plan proposed earlier by JICA for the development of Yangon City. The preliminary works for Bargayar Aletchaung bridge, one of the five proposed river-crossing bridges, was carried out in March 2016 and so far Yangon South West Development Public, Business Capital City Development Ltd and Shwe Popa International Construction are working in the project.

After months of speculation, Yangon Region Chief Minister Phyo Min Thein announced that the project would resume at the end of February 2017. CCCC, which has negotiated a framework agreement with YCDC for developing the project, was sanctioned by the World Bank between 2009 and 2017 for fraud and corruption infractions.
