= Mayor of Yangon =

Mayor of the City of Yangon
- ရန်ကုန်မြို့တော်ဝန်
- Incumbent; Myo Myint Aung since 10 April 2026
- Style: His/Her Excellency
- Member of: Yangon City Development Committee
- Nominator: Chief Minister of Yangon Region
- Appointer: President of Myanmar
- Term length: 5 years

The Mayor of Yangon (Burmese: ရန်ကုန်မြို့တော်ဝန်) is the head of Yangon's government. The mayor concurrently serves as the chairman of the Yangon City Development Committee and a municipal minister of Yangon Region Government.

== History ==
The office of the mayor and the municipal government of Rangoon were established by the British colonial government in 1874 per the Act of 1874, Article 7. The charter of the municipal government was changed per the Burma Act of 1898, and again updated per the City of Rangoon Municipal Act of August 1922.

== Presidents of the Rangoon Municipal Committee (1874–1922) ==
Presidents of the Rangoon Municipal Committee
No.	Name	Took office	Left office	Time in office
1	R. C. Evanson	1 August 1874	4 April 1875	246 days
2	L. McIver	5 April 1875	19 June 1876	1 year, 75 days
3	C. H. E. Adamson	20 June 1876	10 February 1877	235 days
4	R. C. Evanson	11 February 1877	10 September 1881	4 years, 211 days
5	M. C. Poole	11 September 1881	22 March 1882	192 days
6	K. G. Burne	23 March 1882	27 June 1882	96 days
7	M. C. Poole	28 June 1882	21 February 1883	238 days
8	S. Hare	22 February 1883	11 July 1883	139 days
9	H. R. Spearman	12 July 1883	11 January 1884	183 days
10	C. H. E. Adamson	12 January 1884	7 December 1885	1 year, 329 days
11	J. Thompson	8 December 1885	11 January 1886	34 days
12	H. R. Spearman	12 January 1886	29 February 1888	2 years, 48 days
13	D. Norton	1 March 1888	7 February 1891	2 years, 343 days
14	R. C. Temple	18 February 1891	8 August 1892	1 year, 172 days
15	J. M. Macrea	9 August 1892	23 December 1892	136 days
16	R. C. Temple	24 December 1892	18 December 1893	359 days
17	G. M. S. Carter	19 December 1893	18 January 1894	30 days
18	R. C. Temple	19 January 1894	3 March 1894	43 days
19	W. T. Hall	4 March 1894	18 July 1895	1 year, 136 days
20	C. A. Cresswell	19 July 1895	30 December 1895	164 days
21	W. T. Hall	31 December 1895	10 April 1896	101 days
22	H. L. Eales	11 April 1896	13 December 1896	246 days
23	W. T. Hall	14 December 1896	12 April 1897	119 days
24	H. L. Eales	13 April 1897	30 March 1899	1 year, 351 days
25	H. L. Tilly	31 March 1899	22 July 1899	113 days
26	H. L. Eales	23 July 1899	9 August 1899	17 days
27	W. H. A. St. John Leeds	10 August 1899	28 May 1903	3 years, 291 days
28	M. Laurie	29 May 1903	19 September 1903	113 days
29	W. H. A. St. John Leeds	20 September 1903	22 March 1904	184 days
30	M. Laurie	23 March 1904	15 March 1906	1 year, 357 days
31	G. W. Dawson	16 March 1906	15 September 1906	183 days
32	M. Laurie	16 September 1906	10 May 1910	3 years, 236 days
33	G. W. Dawson	17 May 1910	25 January 1911	253 days
34	W. H. L. Cabell	4 February 1911	18 March 1913	2 years, 42 days
35	Gavin Scott	19 March 1913	1 December 1913	257 days
36	W. H. L. Cabell	2 December 1913	8 January 1917	3 years, 37 days
37	Gavin Scott	9 January 1917	31 March 1920	3 years, 82 days
38	J. E. Houdley	1 April 1920	31 March 1921	364 days
39	Gavin Scott	31 March 1921	20 December 1922	1 year, 264 days

== Presidents of the Rangoon Municipal Corporation (1922–1933) ==
Presidents of the Rangoon Municipal Corporation
No.	Image	Name	Took office	Left office	Time in office
40		Peston Padamji Ginwala	21 December 1922	3 July 1923	194 days
41		Alan M. Murray	4 July 1923	31 December 1923	180 days
42		Ba Yin	8 January 1924	31 December 1924	358 days
43		Lee Ah Yain	6 January 1925	31 December 1925	359 days
44		E. M. Patail	5 January 1926	31 December 1926	360 days
45		Charles Haswell Campagnac	4 January 1927	31 December 1927	361 days
46		M. M. Ohn Ghine	6 January 1928	31 December 1928	360 days
47		M. M. Rafi	8 January 1929	31 December 1929	357 days
48		Richard Boswell Rushall	7 January 1930	31 December 1930	358 days
48		Thein Maung	6 January 1931	31 December 1931	359 days
50		Paw Tun	5 January 1932	31 December 1932	361 days
51		Raghubir Singh Dugal	6 January 1933	31 December 1933	359 days

== Mayors of Rangoon (1934–1938) ==
Mayors of Rangoon
No.	Image	Name	Took office	Left office	Time in office
52		J. K. Munshi	9 January 1934	31 December 1934	356 days
53		Kyaw Zan	8 January 1935	31 December 1935	357 days
54		M. M. Rafi	7 January 1936	31 December 1936	359 days
55		Alan M. Murray	5 January 1937	31 December 1937	360 days
56		Ba Glay	4 January 1938	31 December 1938	360 days

== Mayors of Yangon (1985–present) ==
No.	Name	Term of office			Political party
No.	Name	Took office	Left office	Time in office	Political party
1	Tin Pe	1 April 1985	15 August 1986	1 year, 136 days	Burma Socialist Programme Party
2	Aung Khin (politician)	15 August 1986	18 September 1988	2 years, 34 days	Burma Socialist Programme Party
3	Ko Lay	18 September 1988	26 August 2003	14 years, 342 days	Myanmar Military
4	Aung Thein Lin	26 August 2003	6 April 2011	7 years, 223 days	Myanmar Military
5	Hla Myint	6 April 2011	6 April 2016	5 years	Union Solidarity and Development Party
6	Maung Maung Soe	6 April 2016	31 January 2021	4 years, 300 days	Independent
7	Bo Htay	11 February 2021	10 April 2026	5 years, 58 days	Independent
8	Myo Myint Aung	10 April 2026	Incumbent	226 days	
