= People's Pioneer Party =

Political party in Myanmar

People's Pioneer Party ပြည်သူ့ရှေ့ဆောင်ပါတီ
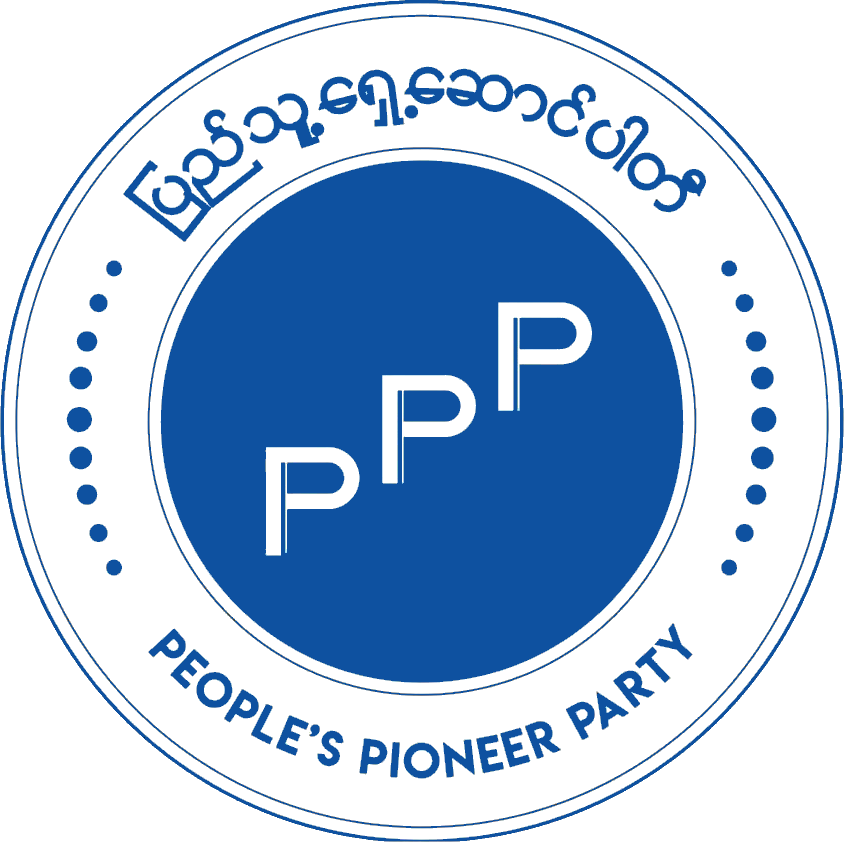
- Chairman: Saw Han Aye
- Vice Chairmen: Tin Maung Gyi
- Honorary Chairmen: Thet Thet Khine
- Founded: 23 October 2019
- Split from: National League for Democracy
- Headquarters: Sanchaung Township, Yangon Region
- Membership: 1,000+
- Ideology: Ultranationalism; Buddhist nationalism
- Political position: Right-wing to far-right
- Colours: Blue
- Management Committee of the State Administration Council: 1 / 32

The People's Pioneer Party (Burmese: ပြည်သူ့ရှေ့ဆောင်ပါတီ, romanized: pyishu shae saung parte; abbr. PPP) is a political party in Myanmar. More than half of the party's 19 founders are businessmen. They include U Myint, a former economic adviser to the Thein Sein's Cabinet; Zaw Oo, an economist who also serves as the party's economic and policy adviser; and Thet Thet Khaing, former member of the Pyithu Hluttaw for Dagon Township who resigned from the National League for Democracy.

The party's founders claimed that a majority of Myanmar's business community was involved in founding the party to help revive the country's declining economy. The People's Pioneer Party ran more than 230 candidates in 11 regions and states in the 2020 general election but won none of the seats. Many members of the party are former military personnel and those with ties to the ultranationalist organisation Ma Ba Tha. In fact, Thet Thet Khaing was one of the sponsors for Ma Ba Tha's third anniversary conference in 2016 and made donations to Insein Ywama Sayadaw, former chairman of Ma Ba Tha, during her election campaign in 2020.

== History ==
Thet Thet Khaing was expelled from the Dagon Township Township Executive Committee of the NLD in November 2018 for allegedly publicly criticizing the NLD through the media. In late 2019, Thet Thet Khaing officially resigned from the NLD and founded the People's Pioneer Party.

The People's Pioneer Party was officially registered as a political party on 23 October 2019 by the Union Election Commission. Kyaw Zeya, a member of the Yangon Region Hluttaw and a frequent critic of the Yangon Region Government, joined the PPP on 25 January 2020, after being officially expelled from the NLD.

The PPP competed in the 2025 Myanmar general election. It received 8.30% of the vote, winning one seat; Thet Thet Khine in Dagon.

== Structure ==
- Chairman – Thet Thet Khaing
- Vice Chairmen – Kyaw Zeya and Myint Maung Tun
- General Secretary – Saw Han Aye

== Election results ==
=== House of Nationalities (Amyotha Hluttaw) ===
| Election | Leader | Total seats won | Total votes | Share of votes | +/- | Status |
|---|---|---|---|---|---|---|
| 2020 | Thet Thet Khaing | 1 / 224 | 171,255 | 0.64% | New | Not recognised |
| 2025–26 | Thet Thet Khaing | 1 / 224 | 1,050,448 | 8.30% | 0 | TBA |

=== House of Representatives (Pyithu Hluttaw) ===
| Election | Leader | Total seats won | Total votes | Share of votes | +/- | Status |
|---|---|---|---|---|---|---|
| 2020 | Thet Thet Khaing | 3 / 440 | 231,024 | 0.87% | New | Not recognised |
| 2025–26 | Thet Thet Khaing | 0 / 440 | 1,000,815 | 7.69% | ▼3 | extra-parliamentary |
