= Yangon City Development Committee =

- ရန်ကုန်မြို့တော် စည်ပင်သာယာရေး ကော်မတီ

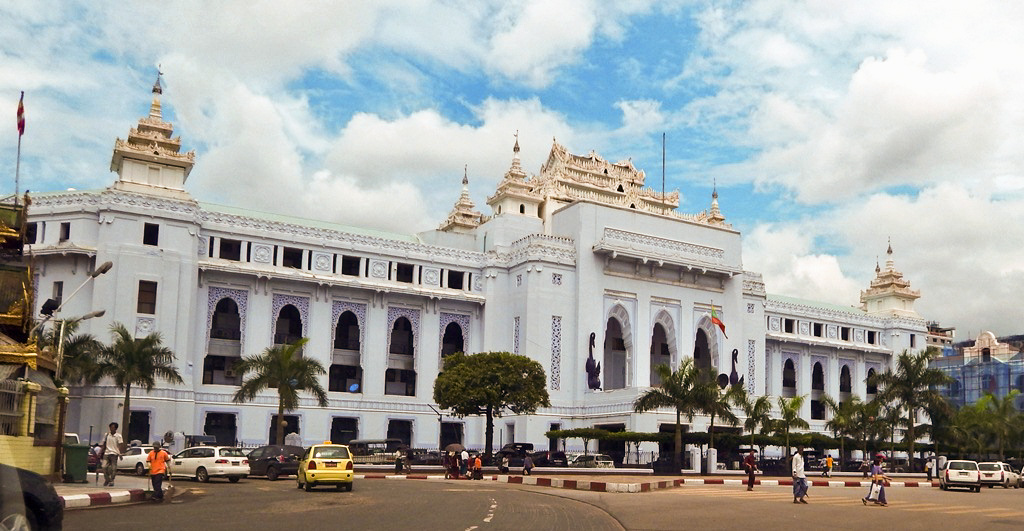
- Yangon City Hall

Agency overview
- Formed: May 14, 1990; 36 years ago
- Preceding agencies: Rangoon Municipal Committee; Rangoon City Corporation
- Headquarters: Yangon City Hall
- Annual budget: Ks.15 billion (2003)
- Minister responsible: Myo Myint Aung; ●Minister of Municipality Affairs, Yangon Region; ●Mayor of Yangon; ●Chairman of YCDC
- Website: www.ycdc.gov.mm

Yangon City Development Committee (Burmese: ရန်ကုန်မြို့တော် စည်ပင်သာယာရေး ကော်မတီ, abbreviated YCDC) is the administrative body of Yangon, the largest city and former capital of Myanmar (Burma). It consists of 18 departments, with headquarters in the Yangon City Hall. The committee's chairman also acts as the city's mayor.

The mayor is directly selected and appointed by the President of Myanmar. For instance, as of April 2026, the current mayor, U Myo Myint Aung, was officially assigned the role via a presidential decree under national administrative laws.

The YCDC is technically independent of the government, and raises its own revenues through tax collection, fees, licenses and property development. In the 2011-2012 budget year, YCDC had an estimated deficit of Ks.5 billion, because of high spending on road construction and purchase of waste collection vehicles.

== List of mayors of Yangon ==
No.	Name	Term of office			Political party
No.	Name	Took office	Left office	Time in office	Political party
1	Tin Pe	1 April 1985	15 August 1986	1 year, 136 days	Burma Socialist Programme Party
2	Aung Khin	15 August 1986	18 September 1988	2 years, 34 days	Burma Socialist Programme Party
3	Ko Lay	18 September 1988	26 August 2003	14 years, 342 days	Myanmar Military
4	Aung Thein Lin	26 August 2003	1 April 2011	7 years, 218 days	Myanmar Military
5	Hla Myint	1 April 2011	1 April 2016	5 years	Union Solidarity and Development Party
6	Maung Maung Soe	1 April 2016	10 February 2021	5 years	Independent
7	Bo Htay	11 February 2021	10 April 2026	5 years	State Administration Council
6	Myo Myint Aung	11 April 2026	Incumbent	216 days	Former Minister Union Solidarity and Development Party

== History ==
On 14 May 1990, the Yangon City Development Law formally established the present incarnation of YCDC, delegating wide responsibilities to this body, including city planning, land administration, tax collection, and development. However, the YCDC is also responsible for duties stipulated in the 1922 Rangoon Municipal Act.

=== e-Government initiative ===
In 2003, YCDC was organized to provide e-Government for Yangon City. The main purposes of the city's e-Government program are to provide seamless access between the government and the city's citizens via the Internet, to reduce paper usage, to reduce the city budget, to build the city's fiber ring, to provide timely public information, to store public data and to develop and expand G2G, G2C, G2B, and G2E programs.

In January 2013 responsibility for e-Government was divided into two Committees;e-Government Administration Committee and e-Government Work Committee. The e-Government Administration Committee includes the Deputy-mayor of Yangon City as patron, the secretary of YCDC as chairman, and the other 18 head of departments are as members.At first, e-Government Work Committee Chairman is the head of public relations and information department. But Nowadays e-Government Work Committee chairman is the head of Committee Office at 2018 and later.

== Responsibilities ==
The YCDC is responsible for the city's:

- waste management (including collection and treatment)
- business licenses and registries
- water supply
- roads and bridges
- environmental regulations
- maintenance of public property (including parks, heritage sites)
- street lighting
- firefighting

=== Cemetery maintenance ===
YCDC's environmental maintenance department maintains 8 cemeteries in Yangon:

1. Yayway Cemetery, North Okkalapa Township
2. Hteinbin Cemetery, Hlaingthaya Township
3. Kyizu Cemetery (ကျီစုသုသာန်), Dagon Seikkan Township
4. Daweigyaung Cemetery (ထားဝယ်ချောင်သုသာန်), North Dagon Township
5. Kyugyaung Cemetery (ကျူချောင်သုသာန်), Shwepyitha Township
6. Dala Cemetery (ဒလသုသာန်), Dala Township
7. Seikkan Khanaungto Cemetery (ဆိပ်ကမ်းခနောင်တိုသုသာန်), Seikkyi Kanaungto Township
8. Seikgyi Cemetery (ဆိပ်ကြီးသုသာန်), Kyimyindaing Township.

== Organization ==
The YCDC is organized as follows:

- Cabinet
  - Mayor
  - Secretary
  - Joint-Secretary
  - Committee Members No.(4) to No.(9)

=== YCDC organization chart ===
1. Committee Office
2. Administration Department
3. Finance and Accounts Department
4. Assessor' Department
5. Engineering Department (Roads & Bridges)
6. Engineering Department(Buildings)
7. Engineering Department (Water & Sanitation)
8. Engineering Department (Drainage Management)
9. Urban Environmental Conservation and Cleaning Department
10. Markets and Commodities Center Department
11. Veterinary and Production Department
12. Vehicle Management and Maintenance Department
13. Urban Lan Administration Department
14. Playground, Parks and Gardens Department
15. Public Relations and Informations Department
16. Public Health Department
17. Urban Planning Department
18. Security and Disciplinary Department
19. Yangon City Golf Club
20. Yangon City Bank

== Controversy ==
YCDC's construction permit system has been criticized for its inefficiency; the average construction time is 2–3 years, because permissions are required from at least 6 YCDC bodies.

In 2015, the YCDC suspended a massive development project called Dagon City, to be built near Shwedagon Pagoda, for failing to adhere to regulations stipulating the building height limits in the vicinity of the pagoda, which is a heritage site. In 2015, YCDC's tender selection process for the construction of the Mindhamma Secondary Central Business District in Mayangon Township was called into question by non-selected bidders.

In April 2018, Zaykabar Company demolished a Yangon heritage site, the Mayor's Residence, which is listed on the YCDC's Yangon City Heritage List. The demolition sparked controversy over YCDC's oversight from watchdog groups like the Yangon Heritage Trust. YCDC subsequently granted approval for Zaykabar to construct a $500 million development project, the Myayeiknyo Royal Project, on the site of the former heritage building. The project has also been opposed by locals for its proximity to other heritage sites like Shwedagon Pagoda, and for concerns that the development may impact the adjacent Kokkine reservoir, which distributes water to eight townships. In June 2018, due to ongoing controversy, the Burmese military ordered Zaykabar to reconstruct the Mayor's Residence "in the original style." Later that year, in October 2018, the military terminated its lease contract with Zaykabar, over contractual breaches, as Zaykabar had signed a joint venture agreement with a Chinese company.

In 2018, Yangon Region Hluttaw lawmakers criticized YCDC's US$80 million loan from the French Development Agency to dredge Pazundaung Creek to develop a waterfront corridor. In October 2019, YCDC courted controversy from the Yangon Region Hluttaw over the purchase of 80 vehicles at a cost of US$1.37 million for city officials.

YCDC sits on the board of directors of the New Yangon City Development Company, which is the developer of a controversial development project, the Yangon New City Project. YCDC has overseen infrastructure tenders for the project.

=== Yangon Sister Cities and Partner Cities ===
Yangon has established sister city relationships with several international cities, primarily in Asia, to promote cooperation in trade, culture, and development. Sister cities of Yangon include Busan (South Korea), Kunming, Nanning, Yangzhou, and Haikou (China), along with Ho Chi Minh City (Vietnam) and Fukuoka (Japan).
