= Kawmhu =

Kawmhu ကော့မှူးမြို့
- Town
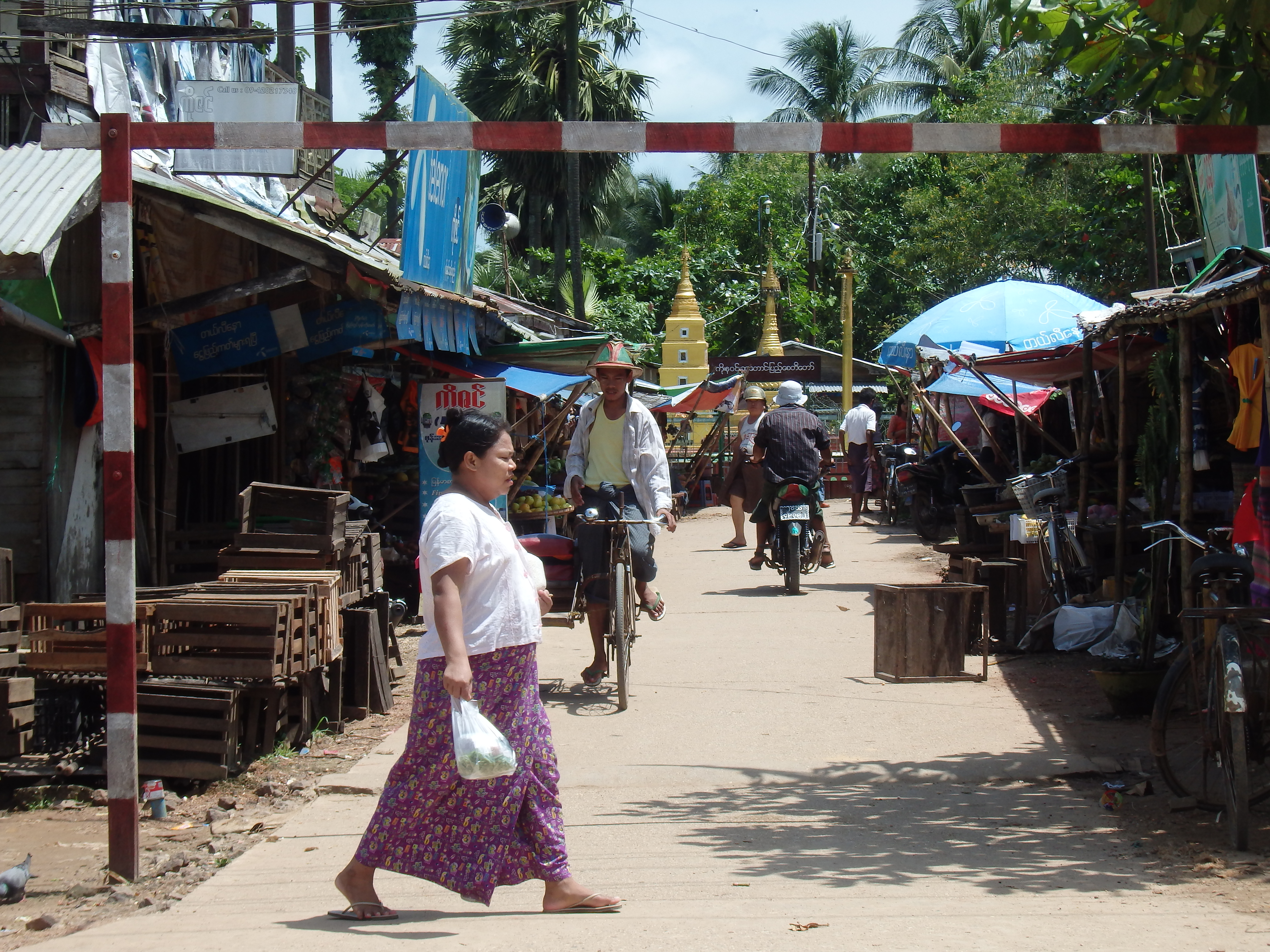
- Downtown Kawhmu

- Location in Myanmar
- Coordinates: 16.5464°N 96.0624°E
- Country: Myanmar
- State: Yangon Region
- District: Twante District
- Township: Kawhmu Township

Area
  - Total: 5.59 sq mi (14.5 km^{2})

Population (2023)
  - Total: 10,150
  - Density: 1,820/sq mi (701/km^{2})
- Time zone: UTC6:30 (MMT)

Kawmhu (Burmese: ကော့မှူးမြို့ Burmese pronunciation: [kɔ̰m̥ú mjo̰]) is the principal town of Kawhmu Township in Twante District, southeastern Yangon Region, Myanmar. It is located in the southwestern section of the region, 17 miles (27 km) from Yangon city. The town is divided into 7 urban wards.
