= Padamji Ginwala =

Indian economist

Sir Padamji Pestonji Ginwala (23 September 1875 – 18 April 1962) was a noted Parsi barrister, economist and public figure based at Bombay, later at Rangoon and lastly at Calcutta.

== Early life ==
He was born in Ankleshwar in Gujarat to Pestonji Nusserwanji and did his early education from Ahmadabad from government school.

== Lawyer ==
He completed his study of Law from University of Cambridge (Trinity Hall) and was called to the Bar at Lincoln's Inn in 1897. Two years later in 1899, he moved back to India and started practice as Advocate at Bombay High Court.

== Teacher ==
Also gave his service as a professor of History and Economics at Elphinstone College, Bombay from 1899–1900.

== In Burma and British India ==
In year 1900 he shifted to Rangoon, Burma, where he practised as advocate at Chief Court of Lower Burma and also served as Editor of Burma Law Times from 1907–1910.

In 1916, he served as Secretary to the Burma Legislative Council. He was member of Legislative Assembly of India from years 1921–23. He was the President of Rangoon Municipal Corporation for years 1921–22. Later he served as a member of Indian Tariff Board 1923–30 for which he served as president in 1926. He was knighted in the 1927 Birthday Honours. He was also a delegate to Imperial Conference in 1930. He was one of the members of Second round Table Conference of India in 1931, Ottawa Conference of 1932 and World Monetary and Economic Conference in 1933. He was one of the experts on fiscal and tariff affairs and headed many committee. He published an essay on Railway Electrification and Industrialization, which work was later published by Indian Chamber of Commerece in 1945 In January 1945, an Iron and Steel (Major) Panel was set up by the then Government to recommend measures for the expansion of the steel industry, which was headed by him. Later, he was Chairman of Tarminal Facilities Committee in 1947.

Here is his speech in the Indian Legislative Assembly on 5 March 1923, it is about system of taxation:-

What takes place in the office of the Honourable the Finance Member every year when he prepares the revenue side of the Budget I can well imagine. He sits in his chair. He has got three men generally with him. On his right is perhaps Mr. Cook, on his left is Mr. Ayyar, and in front of him Mr. Sim. Then he asks, ' How much do these people require ? ' They say, * Oh, this year they want 80 crores 1 of rupees only from taxation'. 'Is that so ? What did they have last year ?' '64 crores.' ' Very well. Give me a copy of the Tariff Act, a copy of the Income Tax Act, and a copy of the Opium and the Salt Acts and a blue pencil.' He takes the blue pencil in his hands and says, ' Here, 11 per cent on this. No. I will put 15 per cent. That will give us 2 crores. Is that not so, Mr. Cook ?' * Yes, approximately that.' Mr. Sim then says, (Income Tax has been rather sterile these last few years. We will try a little super tax on something,' and he adds on something to the super tax. Then he goes through the Opium and Salt Acts, and the same process goes on until he thinks he has secured the additional sixteen crores. I submit that this is not the way in which, any longer, the Indian Budget ought to be prepared. Every country in the world has, at definite periods, undertaken an examination of the taxation of the country with reference to the taxable capacity of the people. They have got figures and they study all the conditions with reference to the requirements of the country. I maintain that though the Finance Department claims to know everything, they have got no data upon which they can determine the taxation with reference to the taxable capacity of the people. There, I submit, is the orthodoxy of the Budget."

== Later life ==
In 1945 before independence of India, he settled in Calcutta. During 1949–1952, he served as Director of Indian Iron & Steel Co. promoted by Calcutta-based industrialist, Sir Ranjen Mookerjee of Martin Burn. He also served as President of Calcutta-based, the Indian Institute of Metals

== Death ==
He died in Calcutta, aged 86.

== Memorials ==
In 1963, a gold medal was established by Indian Institute of Metals in his memory. The Sir Padamji Ginwala Gold Medal is awarded to recognise a candidate securing the highest marks in the Associate Membership Examination (Part-l) of the Institute.

== Family ==
His son Peston Padamji Ginwala (1919–2008) was also a senior barrister working at Calcutta High Court.
