= Maung Maung Soe =

Maung Maung Soe may refer to:

- Maung Maung Soe (politician) (born 1951), Burmese politician
- Maung Maung Soe (footballer) (born 1995), Burmese footballer
- Maung Maung Soe (general), Burmese military commander
