= YBS =

YBS may mean:

- Yale Bright Star catalogue
- Yamanashi Broadcasting System (株式会社山梨放送 Kabushiki-gaisha Yamanashi Hōsō?)
- Yangon Bus Service, Myanmar
- Yorkshire Building Society, UK

== See also ==
- Sinjar Resistance Units (YBŞ)
