= Thukha Yadana Company =

- Native name: သုခရတနာကုမ္ပဏီ
- Company type: Limited company
- Industry: Construction
- Headquarters: Yangon, Myanmar
- Key people: Thaung Htike Min, Chairman

Thukha Yadana Company (Burmese: သုခရတနာကုမ္ပဏီ; also spelt Thukhar Yadanar) is a construction company based in Myanmar. It was one of four Burmese firms involved in the Dagon City 1 project, a major planned development in Dagon Township, Yangon, near the Shwedagon Pagoda. The project was shut down by the national government on 7 July 2015 over growing public opposition to the project. The project had been temporarily suspended in February 2015 by the Yangon City Development Committee.
