= Sandar Min =

Burmese politician and former political prisoner (born 1968)

- စန္ဒာမင်း

Member of the Yangon Region Hluttaw
- Incumbent
- Assumed office 8 November 2015
- Preceded by: Myint Swe
- Constituency: Seikkyi Kanaungto Township № 1

Member of the Pyithu Hluttaw
- In office 31 May 2012 – 29 January 2015
- Preceded by: U Thein Sein
- Succeeded by: Zayar Thaw
- Constituency: Zabuthiri Township

Personal details
- Born: 5 November 1968 (age 57) Yangon, Myanmar
- Party: National League for Democracy (until 2023; party disbanded)
- Spouse: Myo Ko
- Children: None
- Parent: Unknown
- Education: Rangoon Arts and Sciences University (B.Sc. Chemistry)(MPA)
- Occupation: Politician

Sandar Min (Burmese: စန္ဒာမင်း, born 5 November 1968 in Yangon, Myanmar) is a Burmese politician and former political prisoner who currently serves as a Yangon Region Hluttaw MP for Seikkyi Kanaungto Township No. 1 constituency. She previously served as a House of Representatives MP for Zabuthiri Township constituency.

== Early life and education ==
Sandar was born on 5 November 1968 in Yangon, Myanmar. She graduated with B.Sc. (Chemistry) and an MPA from Rangoon Arts and Sciences University.

== Political career ==
Sandar Min first became involved in politics during the 1988 uprisings. At the time, she was studying chemistry and joined thousands of students who took to the streets demanding an end to military rule. She was part of the "Tri-Color" student group, which coordinated the student movement and acted as security for democracy icon and NLD leader Aung San Suu Kyi. As a result, Sandar Min was arrested and sent to prison for the first time in 1989 for 4 years until 1992. The second time she was arrested was in 1996. She was also arrested in 2007 and released in 2012, after spending 5 years in jail for protesting fuel price hikes with the 88 Generation Students Group in 2004. Sandar Min has spent several instances in prison for her political work: 1989 to 1992, 1996, and 2007 to 2012.

Sandar became a member of the National League for Democracy. In the 2012 Burmese by-elections, she contested the Zabuthiri Township constituency for a seat in the Pyithu Hluttaw, the country's lower house, and won the seat that Thein Sein vacated in 2011 to become President of Burma.

In the 2015 Myanmar general election, she was elected as a Yangon Region Hluttaw representative from Seikkyi Kanaungto Township No. 1 parliamentary constituency. She is the chairperson of the regional parliament's Finance, Planning and Economic Committee affairs. Her committee oversaw the strategic development in the Yangon region. Additionally, they audited the government's expenditures against the federal budget as to ensure transparency and accountability in financial management.

Sandar was renowned for being an especially pertubative member whilst in parliament towards the Yangon government. She accused her colleagues in the regional government of jeopardizing economic growth and putting thousands of labourers out of work, after they suspended construction at all projects with nine floors or more. During that time, most of her colleagues were accused of bidding for minister roles. In November 2020, Sandar did not partake in the 3rd general election. Despite this, she held onto her position as a central and prominent committee member of the NLD party and remained politically active nonetheless. Despite the tumultuous circumstances following the military coup in 2021, she remained anchored in the country, maintaining her role as a central committee member amidst the turmoil. She was also the first person to meet with Aung San Suu Kyi during her detainment under the military.
