= Naing Ngan Lin =

Burmese politician

- နိုင်ငံလင်း

Member of the Pyithu Hluttaw
- Incumbent
- Assumed office 1 February 2016
- Constituency: Dekkhinathiri Township

Regional minister for social affairs

Personal details
- Born: 3 September 1977 (age 48) Mon State
- Spouse: Sandar Win
- Children: San Naing Ngan Lin
- Parent(s): Aye Myint (father); Khin Phyu (mother)
- Occupation: Politician

Naing Ngan Lin (Burmese: နိုင်ငံလင်း, born September 3, 1977) is a Burmese politician and former political prisoner who currently serves as a regional minister for social affairs and a Pyithu Hluttaw MP for Dekkhinathiri Township.

He is a member of the National League for Democracy.

== Biography ==
Naing Ngan Lin was born on September 3, 1977, in Thaton Township, Mon State to Aye Myint and Phyu. He moved to Yangon when he was about three years old.

In 2006, he graduated in politics and government from Open University. After graduation, he married his life partner, Sandar Win. He lives in Yangon with his wife, their son and his parents-in-law. He became involved in politics during the Saffron Revolution of 2007. In 2009, he was arrested and spent two months in prison. After he was released, he set up the United Front of Burmese Activists for Democracy.

After Aung San Suu Kyi was released from house arrest, she called on him to work with the NLD in 2010. He founded the Togetherness Free Education Network for Youth and, later, the Health Network with her guidance.

== Political career ==
Naing Ngan Lin is a member of the National League for Democracy. In 2012, he was elected as a Member of Parliament for the NLD. From then until the 2015 Myanmar general election, he was appointed to the national parliament in Naypyitaw. He tried to help his constituency people's problems.

In 2015, He stood for the Yangon regional parliament with his colleagues Phyo Min Thein and Sandar Min. All three of them were elected. He was elected as an Pyithu Hluttaw MP and elected representative from Dekkhinathiri Township parliamentary constituency at the 2015 Myanmar general election. He also serving as a Regional minister for social affairs for Yangon Region.

In the wake of the 2021 Myanmar coup d'état on 1 February, he was detained by the Myanmar Armed Forces.

== Sword attack ==
During the campaign for Pyithu Hluttaw representative Wai Phyo Aung, six NLD members – including Naing Ngan Lin – were attacked by six assailants wielding swords at Manpyae Quarter in Thaketa on 29 October 2019. He suffered severe wounds and was hospitalized at Yangon General Hospital.
