= Thet Thet Khine =

Burmese politician, physician and businesswoman

Dr. Thet Thet Khine
- ဒေါက်တာသက်သက်ခိုင်
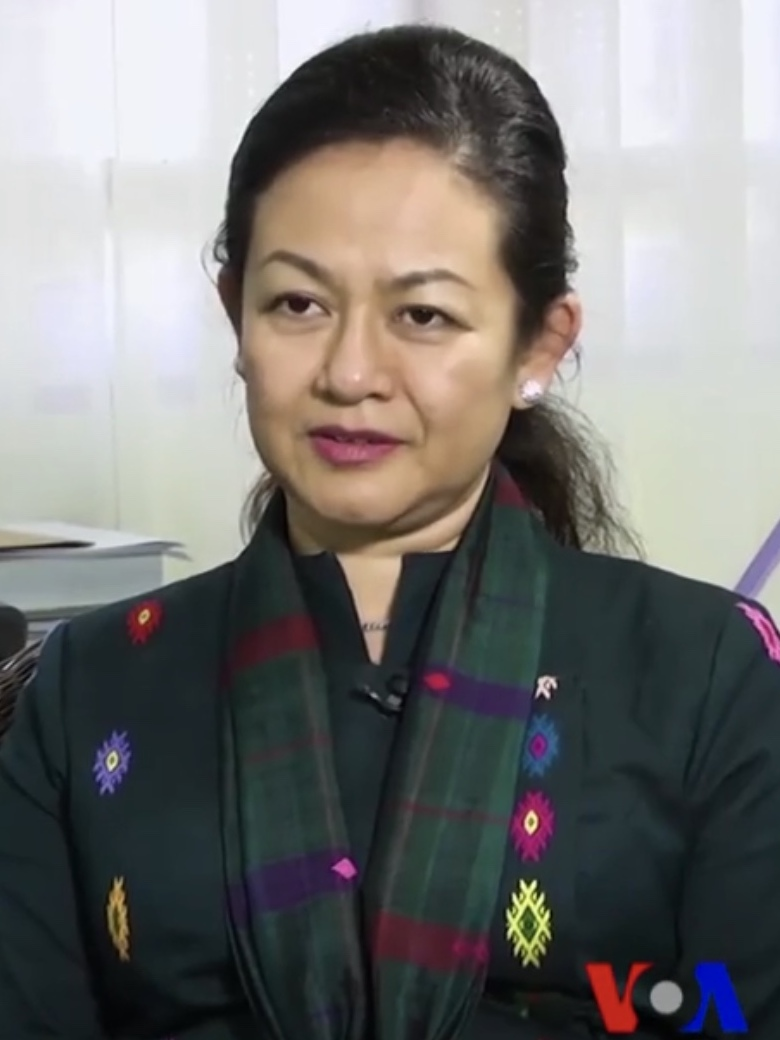
- Thet Thet Khine in 2018

Union Minister for Hotels and Tourism
- In office 3 August 2023 – 31 January 2025
- Appointed by: State Administration Council
- President: Myint Swe (acting)
- Prime Minister: Min Aung Hlaing
- Preceded by: Aung Thaw
- Succeeded by: Kyaw Soe Win

Union Minister for Social Welfare, Relief and Resettlement
- In office 4 February 2021 – 3 August 2023
- Appointed by: State Administration Council
- President: Myint Swe (acting)
- Prime Minister: Min Aung Hlaing
- Deputy: Soe Kyi
- Preceded by: Win Myat Aye
- Succeeded by: Dr Soe Win

Member of Pyithu Hluttaw for Dagon Township
- In office 3 February 2016 – 31 January 2021

Personal details
- Born: 19 August 1967 (age 59) Mogok, Myanmar
- Party: National League for Democracy (2014–19); People's Pioneer Party (2019 to Present)
- Spouse: Aung Kyaw Win
- Children: Thet Yadanar Kyaw Win
- Parent(s): Khin Maung Thein (father); Khin Mya Mya (mother)
- Relatives: Htun Eaindra Bo (sister)
- Education: Institute of Medicine, Yangon (MBBS); Yangon Institute of Economics (MBA); Nanyang Business School (MBA); Walden University (PhD)
- Occupation: Politician; Physician; Businesswoman

Dr. Thet Thet Khine (also spelt Thet Thet Khaing; born 19 August 1967) is a Burmese politician, physician and businesswoman who is the Minister for Social Welfare, Relief and Resettlement appointed by the military junta after the coup d'état in 2021. She was a member of parliament in the House of Representatives for Dagon Township constituency in 2015 elections but did not win her seat at Mayangone Township when she ran in 2020 elections on her newly established People's Pioneer Party platform. She owns a number of gold, jewelry, and gem production companies as well as a real estate business.

== Early life and education ==
Thet Thet Khine was born on 19 August 1967 in Mogok, Burma (now Myanmar). She is the youngest child of three siblings, having an elder brother and an elder sister, Htun Eaindra Bo, an actress and singer. She graduated with M.B.B.S from Institute of Medicine, Yangon in 1993, MBA (General Management) from Yangon Institute of Economics in 2004, MBA (Nanyang Fellows) from Nanyang Technological University's Nanyang Business School in 2008, and then International Management Program, MA, (USA) from MIT Sloan School of Management in 2008. She started her PhD (Public Management and Leadership) course in Walden University in 2012 and finished it in 2019.

== Career ==
She owns a number of gold, jewelry, and gem production companies, including Forever Gems and Shwe Nan Taw gold and jewellery, country's largest gold and jewelry retailer. She is also managing director of Jewel Collection Manufacturing Co.Ltd and United GP Development Co.Ltd.

She had served as joint secretary General of the Union of Myanmar Federation of Chambers of Commerce and Industries (UMFCCI) from 2013 to 2016. She is also the vice president of Myanmar Women Entrepreneurs Association (MWEA) since 2013, and vice president of Infinite Myanmar Metta Foundation since 2012. Thet is a treasurer of Myanmar Gold Entrepreneurs Association (MGEA).

=== 2014–2018: Entry into politics ===
Her political aspirations first began in 1988, at the time of the 8888 pro-democracy uprising, when she was a student and joined the protests. She was an active supporter for the pro-democracy movement by the National League for Democracy in Mogok during the 1990 Myanmar general election.

In 2014, she became a member of the National League for Democracy. In the 2015 Myanmar general election, she contested the Dagon Township constituency winning a majority of 84,31 votes, won a House of Representatives seat. She also serves as the member of Banks and Financial Development Committee for House of Representatives.

In 2016, Thet Thet Khine criticized Yangon Region government's announcement to halt more than 200 high-rise construction projects due their non-compliance with building regulations. Thet Thet Khine herself was a major investor in one of the most controversial high rise projects, the 68 Residence in Bahan Township.

=== 2018–present: Dismissal from NLD and founding of the PPP ===
In September 2018, Thet Thet Khine and Kyaw Zeya, a Yangon Region Hluttaw MP were suspended from their duties by the NLD Central Committee for allegedly criticizing the party in the media. Thet Thet Khine told the public media at a discussion on the anniversary of the November 2016 election that "Aung San Suu Kyi could not decide her role in the government and was like a player who plays everywhere on the football pitch".

After her dismissal from NLD, she founded People's Pioneer Party and became its chairperson . Her party was approved by Union Election Committee, Myanmar in October 2019. Kyaw Zeya also joined the newly founded People's Pioneer Party in 2020 as the Vice Chairman. Thet Thet Khine claimed that her party would enlist the help of professionals and experts to come up with programmes to promote and protect public welfare.

She contested in the 2020 Myanmar general election as the chair of the People's Pioneer Party (PPP) and suffered a landslide defeat. She lost her bid to win a seat in the House of Representatives representing Yangon's Mayangon Township by an overwhelming margin. She garnered mere 7,498 votes (7.03% of votes), less than a tenth of the number won by her National League for Democracy (NLD) rival, Dr. May Win Myint, who finished with 89,548 votes.

In the aftermath of the 2021 Myanmar coup d'état, the military regime, the State Administrative Council, appointed Thet Thet Khine as the Minister for Social Welfare, Relief and Resettlement. Her acceptance of the role was widely criticized, reinforcing her image as a "turncoat" doing the Burmese military's bidding. Burmese netizens called for the boycott of her jewellery businesses in response.

On 13 January 2026, Thet Thet Khine was detained by the National Defence and Security Council junta. Although PPP officials were told she was being "questioned," she previously criticized the 2025 Myanmar general election for being stacked in the Union Solidarity and Development Party's favour. According to the Union Election Commission, she allegedly met with diplomats without official permission.

== Controversies ==
Thet Thet Khine garnered controversy for her ties with Ma Ba Tha, a renowned xenophobic and ultranationalist organisation led by Wirathu in addition to her People's Pioneer Party fielding ultranationalist candidates in the 2020 general election. She was also one of the sponsors for Ma Ba Tha's third anniversary conference in 2016 and made donations to Insein Ywama Sayadaw, former chairman of Ma Ba Tha, during her election campaign in 2020. Her party included at least ten former Ma Ba Tha members.

She was also present at a controversial meeting with Min Aung Hlaing, the Commander-in-Chief of Myanmar military, where 34 of Myanmar's 95 registered political parties sought the military chief's support in the 2020 general election.

She has also denied the Rohingya genocide. She was also criticised for voicing to collaborate with the military as well as backing its role in politics.

In August 2020, Thet Thet Khine drew further criticism when she praised a controversial music video released by Yone Lay, which depicted an assassination attempt on Aung San Suu Kyi and praised the military as saviours. The music video was widely criticised as a pro-military propaganda piece and was promoted by social media pages with ties to the military and the military-backed opposition party, USDP. Thet Thet Khine stated that she respects Yone Lay for his efforts in making the music video and gave her thanks to him.

She was also heavily criticised for accepting a position in the cabinet set up by the military in the aftermath of the 2021 Myanmar coup d'état. Thet Thet Khine further claimed that Aung San Suu Kyi was a "[criminal] serving her sentence," citing a case where she allegedly used a helicopter meant for disaster relief as a method of personal travel.

== Personal sanctions ==
In February 2022, she was sanctioned by the EU due to her close association with and active support for the State Administration Council as well as her denial of the ongoing Rohingya genocide perpetrated by the military.

== Awards ==
She was awarded Outstanding ASEAN Women Entrepreneurs Award. She was also awarded Thudhamma Theingi for her contributions to the nation.

She holds two Master of Business Administration degrees from University of Yangon and Nanyang Technological University under the Nanyang Fellows program. She also completed an online Doctor of Philosophy in Public Management and Leadership from Walden University, a controversial, online, for-profit university based in Minnesota.

== Personal life ==
Thet married Aung Kyaw Win, a businessman and physician, on 3 April 1994. They have one daughter, Thet Yadanar Kyaw Win.
