= Kyaw Zeya =

Burmese politician

Member of the Yangon Region Hluttaw
- In office 3 February 2016 – 31 January 2021
- Constituency: Dagon Township № 2

Personal details
- Born: 25 January 1956 (age 70)
- Party: People's Pioneer Party
- Children: Moe Yan Zun
- Parent(s): Myint Swe (father); Khin Thein (mother)
- Education: B.A (L.L.B)

Kyaw Zeya (Burmese: ကျော်ဇေယျ, also spelt Kyaw Zayya; born 25 January 1956) is a Burmese politician and a retired lieutenant colonel in the armed forces who was served as a Member of Parliament in the Yangon Region Hluttaw for Dagon Township No. 2 constituency. He also served on the board of Myanmar Economic Holdings Limited, a major conglomerate run by the military, for 10 years. He was a member of the National League for Democracy until 2019 when he went on to join People's Pioneer Party.

He left from National League for Democracy in 2019 and he joined People's Pioneer Party founded by his colleague, Thet Thet Khine, as the vice chairman while as serving as the Human Resources Committee Chair of her party.

== Political career ==
He was a member of the National League for Democracy. In the 2015 Myanmar general election, he contesting for Yangon Region Hluttaw from Dagon Township No. 2 parliamentary constituency, won a seat. Kyaw Zeya serves as a member of the Yangon Region Parliament's Finance, Planning and Economic Committee.

He became the Vice Chairman of People's Pioneer Party. He also serves as Chairman of Human Resources Committee in the PPP together with Thura Aung.
