= Shwe Ohn =

- ရွှေအုံး
- Born: 14 March 1923; Nyaungshwe Township, British Burma
- Died: 20 August 2010 (aged 87); Sanchaung Township, Yangon, Myanmar
- Resting place: Yayway Cemetery, Yangon

Shwe Ohn (1923-2010) was an ethnic Shan politician and co-founder of the Union Democratic Party, which contested the 2010 Burmese general election. He participated in the Panglong Conference and was an advocate for federalism in Burma.

In his final years, he began working on an autobiography, in spite of being diagnosed with liver cancer. The book, entitled Union Traveler, was published in May 2011.

He died from complications of liver cancer at his home in Yangon's Sanchaung Township on 20 August 2010. He was buried at Yayway Cemetery in Yangon.
