= Htay Aung (businessman) =

Business Magnate

Htay Aung (Burmese: ဌေးအောင်; born 1956) is a Burmese businessman and politician who owns a number of hotels including Orchid Hotel. In the 2020 Myanmar general election, he contested as an independent candidate for the House of Representatives seat from the Kawhmu Township constituency against the State Counsellor Aung San Suu Kyi but lost.

== Early life and education ==
Htay Aung was born in 1956 in Bago, Myanmar into the Burmese-Muslim family. He dropped out of school in grade 8.

== Career ==
Htay Aung started his career as a trader at black market in 1970 at the age of 14 during the socialist rule. Later he worked in the edible oil business and petroleum products. He spent 8 months in prison for illegally importing petroleum. In 1993, he entered the hotel business and founded the Orchid Hotel in 1997. He also owned Nan Myaing Hotel in Pyin Oo Lwin, City Hotel and Latt Khote Kone Hotel in Yangon, and Kan Nar Hotel in Sittwe. On July 14, 2018, Htay Aung give back the licenses of Nan Myaing Hotel and other three hotels to the Ministry of Hotels and Tourism. The ministry has charged Htay Aung with failing to pay 130 million Burmese kyats in rents.

In the 2020 general election, he run as an independent candidate for the Kawhmu Township constituency, Yangon Region, but lost to Aung San Suu Kyi.

On 21 August 2020, Htay Aung has been arrested under section 124a of the penal code for sedition after holding a press conference attacking Aung San Suu Kyi and accusing the ruling party National League for Democracy of accepting funds from OIC. The law carries a maximum sentence of 20 years and a fine. Pazundaung Township administrator Chan Nyein Aung filed a lawsuit at the Yangon Eastern District Court and sent him to Insein Prison. In January 2022, after the Tatmadaw (Burmese military) seized power in a coup d'état and deposed the democratically elected government, Min Aung Hlaing appointed him the representative to the OIC member countries to reduce the international pressure, relating to the prosecuting of Rohingya genocide case at the International Court of Justice.
