= Hteinbin Cemetery =

Cemetery in Yangon, Myanmar

- Interactive map of Hteinbin Cemetery

Details
- Location: Hlaingthaya Township, Yangon
- Country: Myanmar
- Coordinates: 16.883072°N 96.024130°E
- Owned by: Yangon City Development Committee

Hteinbin Cemetery (Burmese: ထိန်ပင်သုသာန်; also spelt Htein Pin Cemetery), located in Hlaingthaya Township, is one of the largest cemeteries in Yangon, Myanmar. The cemetery is maintained by the Yangon City Development Committee's environmental maintenance department. Hteinbin Cemetery consists of various ethnic and religious cemeteries, including those of the Karen, Burmese Muslims, former Shan saophas, Christians, Hindus and Sino-Burmese.

== Notable burials ==
- Ko Ko Maung

== See also ==
- Yayway Cemetery
