= Kungyangon Township =

Kungyangon Township ကွမ်းခြံကုန်း မြို့နယ်
- Township
- Kungyangon Township
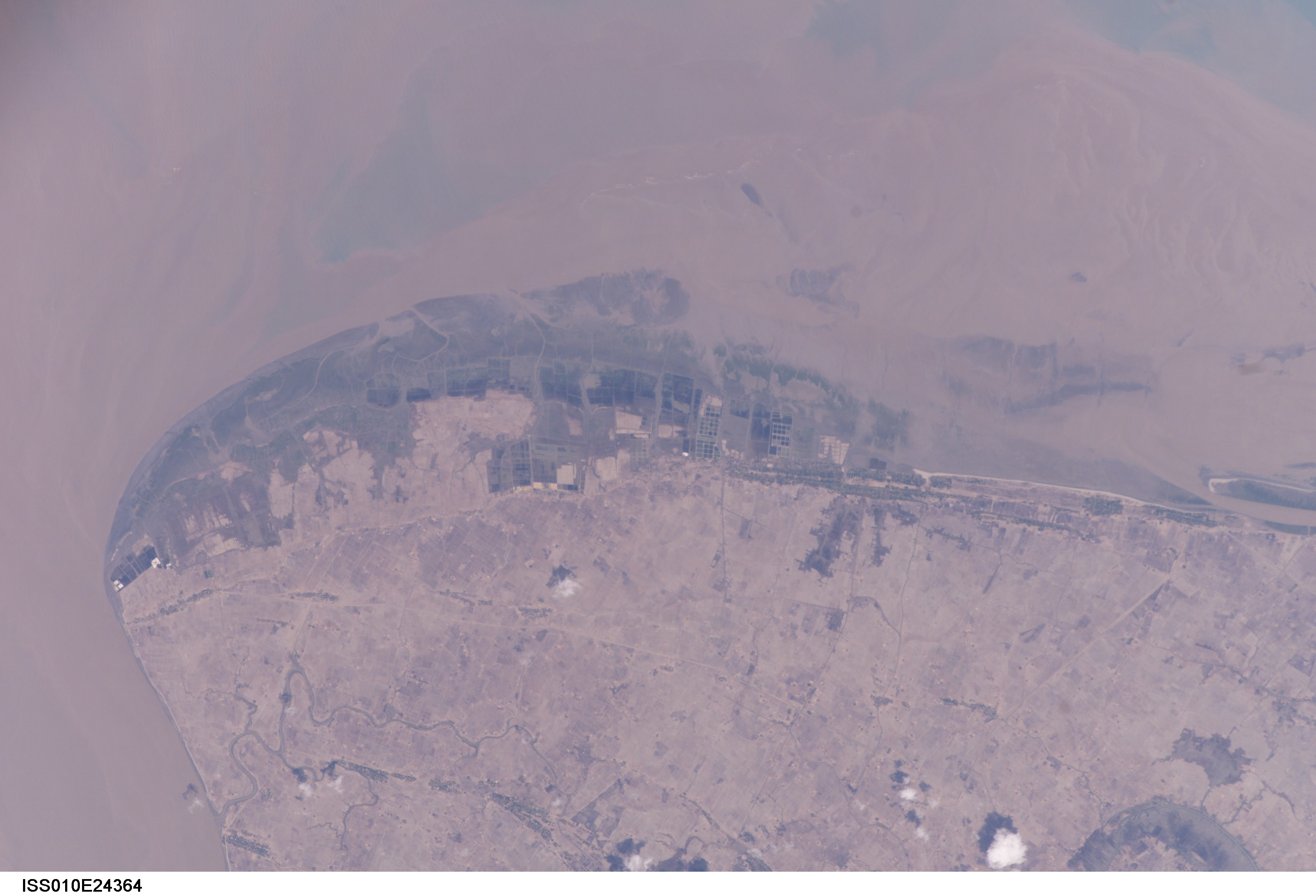
- Space view of far southern edge of Kungyangon Township

- Kungyangon township in Twante district
- Coordinates: 16°26′24.2″N 96°00′43.8″E
- Country: Myanmar
- State: Yangon Region
- District: Twante District
- Capital: Kungyangon

Population (2014)
  - Total: 111,632
- Time zone: UTC6:30 (MMT)
- Postal codes: 130307
- Area codes: 1 (mobile: 80, 99)

Kungyangon Township (Burmese: ကွမ်းခြံကုန်း မြို့နယ် [kʊ́ɰ̃dʑàɰ̃ɡòʊɰ̃ mjo̰nɛ̀]) is a township of the Twante District, Yangon Region, Myanmar. It is located by the Andaman Sea in the southwestern part of the region.
