= Kawhmu Township =

Kawmhu Township ကော့မှူး မြို့နယ်; Mon: ဍုၚ်ကအ်မုဟ်
- Township
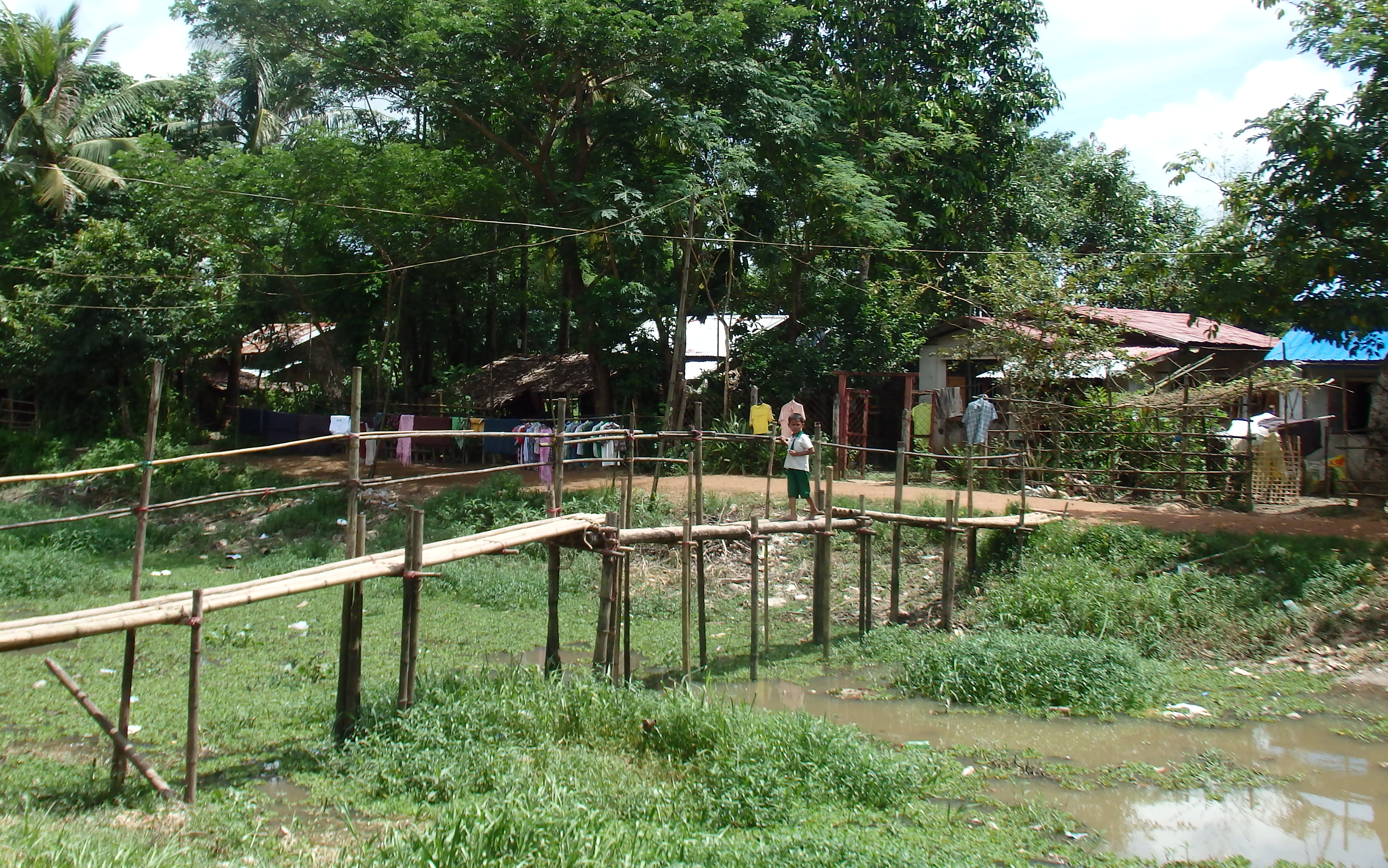
- Village near Kawhmu town

- Kawhmu township in Twante District
- Coordinates: 16.553°N 96.092°E
- Country: Myanmar
- State: Yangon Region
- District: Twante District
- Capital: Kawmhu

Area
  - Total: 241.09 sq mi (624.4 km^{2})

Population (2023)
  - Total: 135,121
  - Density: 560.46/sq mi (216.39/km^{2})
- Time zone: UTC6:30 (MMT)
- Area codes: 1 (mobile: 80, 99)

Kawmhu Township (Burmese: ကော့မှူး မြို့နယ် [kɔ̰m̥ú mjo̰nɛ̀] Mon: ဍုၚ်ကအ်မုဟ်) is a township of Yangon Region, Myanmar. It is located in the southwestern section of the Region. Kawhmu was one of the townships in Yangon Region most affected by Cyclone Nargis. The township only has one town, the principal town of Kawhmu, which is divided into 7 urban wards. It additionally has 130 villages grouped into 55 village tracts.

== Politics and history ==
Labor activist and political prisoner Su Su Nway is from Htan Manaing village in the township, where she became the first Burmese national to successfully sue local government officials under a 1999 law for forced labour.

In January 2012, after spending years in house arrest under the orders of Myanmar's ruling junta, Aung San Suu Kyi announced that she would be running for elected office to represent Kawhmu in parliament in elections slated for April 2012. The elections came after the Burmese government, led by President Thein Sein, began normalising relations with the West and showing other signs of democratic reform.

On 1 April 2012, Suu Kyi won her local election and now represents Kawhmu Township in the Burmese lower house of parliament. She leads the National League for Democracy (NLD), a party that had not participated in major elections for two decades because of various bans and boycotts. In the 2020 Myanmar general election, Htay Aung contested as an independent candidate for the Kawhmu Township constituency against the State Counsellor Aung San Suu Kyi but lost.
