= Union Democratic Party =

Burmese political party

The Union Democratic Party (Burmese: ပြည်ထောင်စုဒီမိုကရေစီပါတီ, abbreviated UDP) is a Burmese political party founded in 2008. It was formally registered in May 2010, with headquarters in Bahan Township, Yangon. UDP is contesting the 2010 general election in Burma. UDP's chairman is Thein Htay, after Phyo Min Thein resigned, citing concerns over the election's fairness. The Union Democratic Party is a merger of the Public Democracy Party, founded by Phyo Min Thein, and the Union Democracy Alliance Organisation, founded by Shan political leader Shwe Ohn.
