= Ye Min Oo =

- ရဲမင်းဦး

Minister for Planning and Finance of Yangon Region Government
- Incumbent
- Assumed office 3 June 2020
- Preceded by: Myint Thaung

Vice Mayor of Naypyidaw
- In office 25 June 2019 – 3 February 2021

Vice Chairman of Naypyidaw Development Committee
- In office 25 June 2019 – 3 February 2021

Personal details
- Born: 1975 (age 50–51) Yangon, Myanmar
- Party: National League for Democracy
- Education: Yangon University
- Occupation: Business executive, Politician

Ye Min Oo (Burmese: ရဲမင်းဦး) is a Burmese business executive and politician who is currently serving as Minister for Planning and Finance of Yangon Region Government. He served as the vice mayor of Myanmar's capital Naypyidaw and the vice-chairman of the Naypyidaw Development Committee from 25 June 2019 to 3 February 2021. He is widely known for his business executive and non-profit executive roles in the financial and business industries. He was elected as a Yangon divisional parliament member in November 8, 2020 election.

== Early life and education ==
Ye Min Oo was born in Rangoon, Burma (now Yangon, Myanmar) in 1975. He completed his undergraduate degree at Yangon University in 2001.

== Business executive career ==
He worked as a Managing Director of Asia Green Development Bank from 2010 to 2014. He also served as a secretary of Myanmar Credit Bureau and co-secretary of Myanmar Payment Union. In 2014, he established a firm, Grand National Capital (GNC), as a subcontractor to a construction firm, Min Kyan Sit, owned by Nandar Hla Myint, a senior official of the Union Solidarity and Development Party. GNC was unable to complete a major construction project, the Aye Tharyar housing project, in Shan State, and owes a significant debt to the Shan State Government.

== Political career ==
In 2013, Ye Min Oo became a member of National League for Democracy (NLD)'s Information Committee Member. Ye Min Oo has been a member of the National League for Democracy (NLD)’s economic committee since 2016.

He began serving as the Chairman of Naypyidaw Sibin Bank in January 2019 and is also an observer of the economic, financial and banking sectors.

In the wake of the 2021 Myanmar coup d'état on 1 February, he was detained by the Myanmar Armed Forces.

== Controversies ==
Ye Min Oo has courted controversy for his active business interests and potential conflicts of interest as a publicly elected official. He was previously the chair of Rakhine Coastline Development Public Company (RCDPC), which is involved in beach resort development in southern Rakhine State. The company was reincorporated under Aye Nandar Sein, his wife, in October 2019. In addition to RCDPC and GNC, he and his wife are connected to several private companies, including Goen Mandalay Development, Ayeyarwaddy Farmers Development Bank, Elite Telecom, Inle Future Development, Htoo Group of Companies, Atlas Veritas Aequitas (AVA), Pinus Pinaster, and Trust Venture Partners. In December 2020, the NLD announced that Ye Min Oo may face an official investigation if he is unable to resolve the accusations of conflicts of interest on is own.

== Personal life ==
Ye Min Oo is married to Aye Nandar Sein.
