= Thaung Htike Min =

Burmese businessman

- Occupation: Chairman of Thukha Yadana Company

Thaung Htike Min (Burmese: သောင်းထိုက်မင်း; also spelt Thoung Htike Min) is a Burmese businessman. He is currently managing director of JL Family Group, the parent company of Flying Tiger Engineering, and chairman of Thukha Yadana Company.
