= Aung Khin (politician) =

Burmese politician

- အောင်ခင်

2nd Mayor of Yangon
- In office 31 December 1986 – 10 November 1988
- Preceded by: Tin Pe
- Succeeded by: Ko Lay

Personal details
- Party: BSPP
- Education: Defence Services Academy

Military service
- Allegiance: Myanmar
- Branch/service: Myanmar Army
- Rank: Colonel

Aung Khin (Burmese: အောင်ခင်, pronounced [ʔàʊɰ̃ kʰɪ̀ɰ̃]) was mayor of Yangon from 1986 to 1988.

Political offices
Preceded by Tin Pe	Mayor of Yangon; 1986-1988	Succeeded by Ko Lay
