= Peston Padamji Ginwala =

Indian lawyer

Peston Padamji Ginwala

Peston Padamji Ginwala (9 February 1919 – 2 July 2008) also known as Pesi Ginwala was a noted senior barrister from India, working at Calcutta High Court.

== Life-sketch ==
He was born on 9 February 1919 in Rangoon to Sir Padamji Pestonji Ginwala, also a noted barrister, economist and public figure of British India and British Burma. Peston was educated at Charterhouse School, London, before completing his law degree at the prestigious Balliol College, Oxford. He joined the bar at Inner Temple. He moved to Calcutta in 1945, before starting his career at Calcutta High Court. Peston was married to Hilla, in whose honour he started a scholarship named The Hilla Ginwala Scholarship worth £10,000 per year for needy students from India, willing to study at Oxford University He was noted for his legal acumen and expertise. He also served as a director in various companies like Indian Iron & Steel Co. promoted by Calcutta-based industrialist, Sir Ranjen Mookerjee and others.

He died in Kolkata in July 2008.
