= Yangon Region Transport Authority =

Overview
- Native name: ရန်ကုန်တိုင်းဒေသကြီး အများပြည်သူ သယ်ယူပို့ဆောင်ရေး ကြီးကြပ်မှုအာဏာပိုင်အဖွဲ့
- Area served: Yangon Region, Myanmar
- Transit type: Bus transport
- Number of lines: 135
- Headquarters: Yangon, Myanmar

The Yangon Region Transport Authority (YRTA; Burmese: ရန်ကုန်တိုင်းဒေသကြီး အများပြည်သူ သယ်ယူပို့ဆောင်ရေး ကြီးကြပ်မှုအာဏာပိုင်အဖွဲ့) is the operating transit agency for Yangon Region, Myanmar. It was formed on 8 July 2016. YRTA currently operates Yangon Bus Service, which began operations on 15 January 2017.
