= Twante District =

District in Yangon Region, Myanmar

Twante District တွံတေးခရိုင်
- District
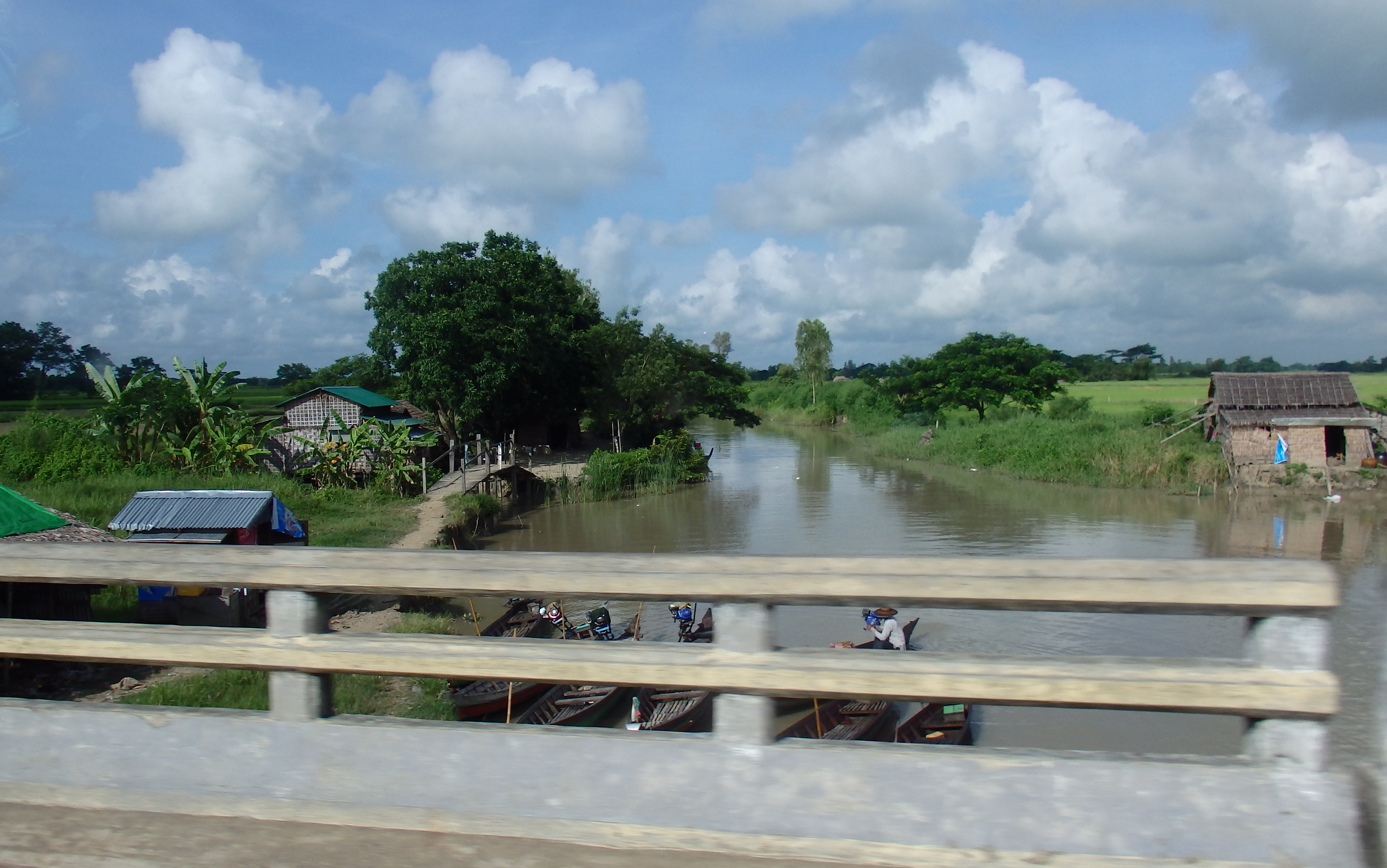
- A stream in Twante Township

- Twante District in Yangon Region
- Coordinates: 16.630°N 96.051°E
- Country: Myanmar
- Region: Yangon Region
- City: Yangon (partial)
- Area code: +951

Twante or Twantay District (Burmese: တွံတေးခရိုင်) is a district in southwest Yangon Region, Myanmar. Portions of the district on the southern banks of the Yangon River are more incorporated into the city of Yangon The district was created in 2022, being one of the new districts created from the former South Yangon District, incorporating five townships.

== Administration ==
The district has five townships. Dala Township and Seikkyi Kanaungto Township are both townships that have some inclusion in Yangon city. The remaining three townships are Kawhmu Township, Kungyangon Township and Twante Township. The Twante Township Court was upgraded to a district-level court.

== See also ==
- List of districts and neighborhoods of Yangon
