= Tin Pe =

Burmese politician

- တင်ဖေ

1st Mayor of Yangon
- In office 1 April 1985 – 15 August 1986
- Succeeded by: Aung Khin

Member of the Union Revolutionary Council
- In office 2 March 1962 – 1968

Personal details
- Party: BSPP
- Education: Defence Services Academy
- Awards: Thura

Military service
- Allegiance: Myanmar
- Branch/service: Myanmar Army
- Rank: Colonel

Tin Pe (Burmese: တင်ဖေ, pronounced [tɪ̀ɰ̃ pʰè]) served as the mayor of Yangon, Burma, from 1985 to 1986. He was also a founding member of the Union Revolutionary Council from 2 March 1962 until his resignation in 1970. Tin Pe was married to Tan Yu Sai's sister, Thein Saing.
