= Yangon Bus Service =

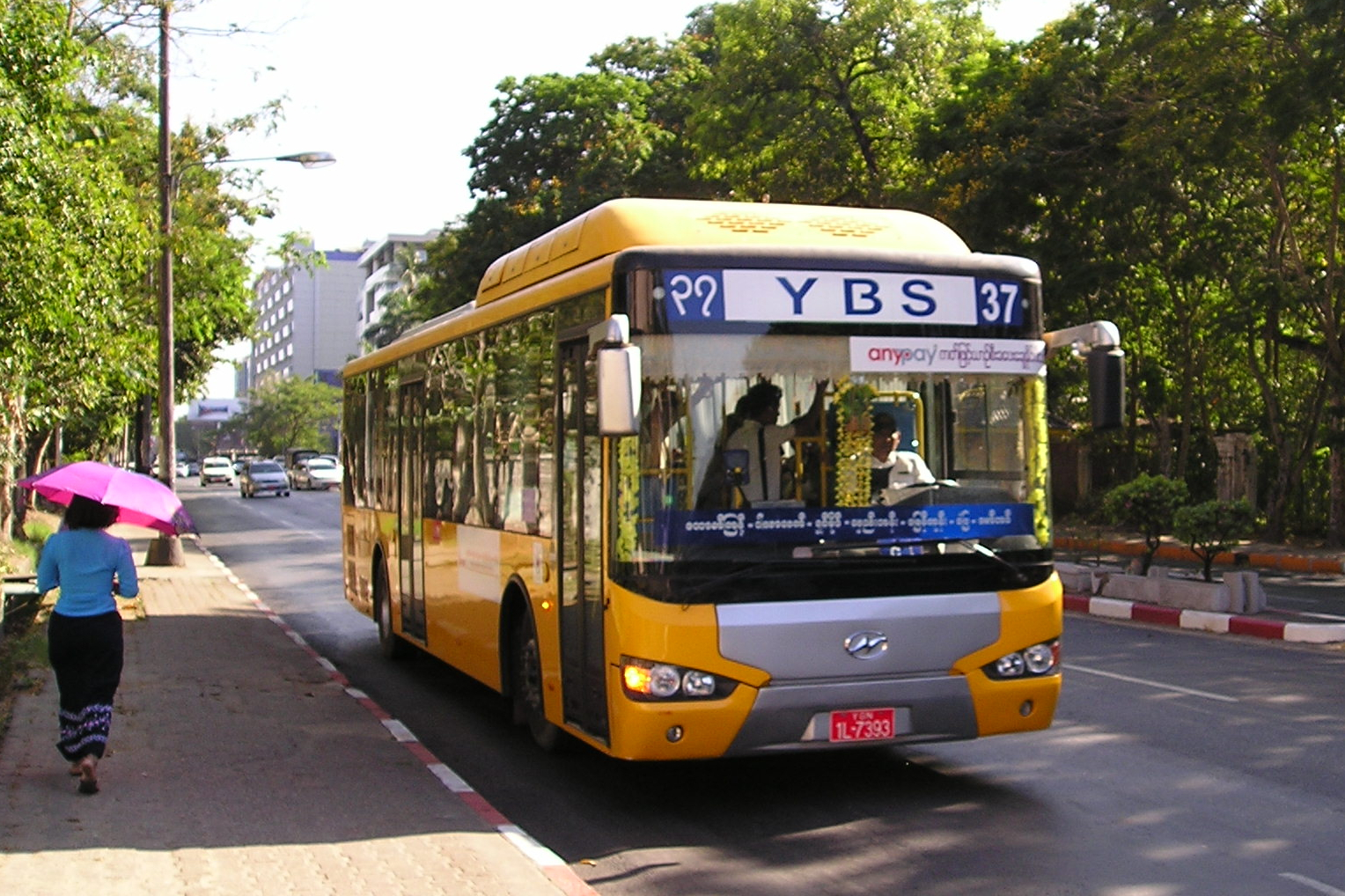
- Parent: Yangon Region Transport Authority
- Commenced operation: 16 January 2017
- Locale: Yangon Region, Myanmar
- Service area: Yangon Region
- Service type: Bus transport
- Routes: 135
- Fleet: 4,000
- Operator: 8 private operators
- Chief executive: Saw Bo Bo

Yangon Bus Service (YBS) is a bus transport network system which started operations on 16 January 2017, serving Myanmar's former capital city of Yangon. It is operated by the Yangon Region Transport Authority (YRTA) until the organisation was abolished on 20 May 2021 and reorganized as Yangon Region Public Transport Committee (YRTC).

== History ==
Prior to the implementation of the new bus network, Yangon's bus network was overseen by the Yangon Motor Vehicles Supervisory Committee (colloquially referred to as Ma Hta Tha), and served a majority of the city's 2.8 million commuters daily. Private bus companies also ran lines throughout the city at a smaller scale. Of the 7,800 buses registered in Yangon, 4,000 of them plied the streets of Yangon daily, covering over three hundred bus lines.

The main reason for the overhaul of the bus network was the increasing number of complaints against bus operators for compromising passengers' safety in a bid to maximise profits, with bus drivers driving dangerously to pick up more commuters than their competition. The bus conductors (locally known as 'spares') were also heavily criticised for their poor attitude and constant overcharging.

Former Chief Minister of Yangon, U Phyo Min Thein brought the issue of public transport reforms into the spotlight.

== Implementation ==
Prior to the citywide overhaul of the bus network, small-scale reforms had already been made to improve the city's bus network. This included the implementation of Yangon's first bus rapid transit system, the Yangon BRT, in February 2016 operated by Yangon Bus Public Company Limited. Beginning in January 2020, passengers can either pay with cash or smart cards.

The new bus network has reduced the old network's 300 lines to 100. However, some of the buses which have same line number but slightly different routes are separated into different lines. Now, they are numbered around 130.

YBS will be installing the Yangon Payment Service card system in 4,000 buses in 2019. Asia Starmar Transport Intelligence Co., won the tender to install the card payment system.

== Criticism ==
Yangon Bus Service receives criticisms for being ill-equipped to serve commuters, shortage of buses, misconduct of bus staff and constant violation of traffic rules. On 7 April 2017, lawmakers from Yangon Region Parliament called for a transparent review of the YBS.
