= Hla Myint (brigadier general) =

Burmese politician and diplomat

- လှမြင့်

Mayor of Yangon
- In office 6 April 2011 – 6 April 2016
- Preceded by: Aung Thein Lin
- Succeeded by: Maung Maung Soe

Myanmar Ambassador to Japan
- In office 2005–2010

Myanmar Ambassador to Argentina and Brazil
- In office 2002–2005
- Succeeded by: Htein Win

Personal details
- Born: 1948 or 1949
- Party: USDP
- Education: Defence Services Academy

Military service
- Allegiance: Myanmar
- Branch/service: Myanmar Army
- Years of service: 1971–2002
- Rank: Brigadier General
- Commands: Northeastern Command

Hla Myint (Burmese: လှမြင့် [l̥a̰ mjɪ̰ɰ̃]) is a Burmese politician, ambassador, and former mayor of Yangon. He was also a brigadier general in the Myanmar Army, and has served as a diplomat.

Myint studied at the Defense Services Academy from 1967 to 1971. He retired as brigadier general in 2002. After military service, he had served as ambassador to Argentina and Brazil from 2002 to 2005, and to Japan from 2005 to 2010.

Political offices
Preceded by Aung Thein Lin	Mayor of Yangon; 2011-2016	Succeeded by Maung Maung Soe
