= Maung Maung Soe (politician) =

H.E. Maung Maung Soe
- မောင်မောင်စိုး

Mayor of Yangon
- In office 5 April 2016 – 1 February 2021
- Preceded by: Hla Myint

Personal details
- Born: May 15, 1951 (age 74) Magway
- Occupation: Professor

Maung Maung Soe (Burmese: မောင်မောင်စိုး) is the mayor of Myanmar's largest city, Yangon. He was concurrently appointed as mayor and chairman of the Yangon City Development Committee on 5 April 2016. He is a retired professor at the Yangon Institute of Economics.

Maung Maung Soe was born on 15 May 1951. He earned a Bachelor of Economics degree at the then Rangoon Institute of Economics in 1973.

In April 2016, controversy surrounding his academic credentials surfaced, because his master's and doctorate degrees were obtained from a diploma mill, the Christian International School of Theology (Manila). Further, his master's and doctorate degrees from the International Institute of Social Studies could not be independently verified.

Political offices
Preceded by Hla Myint	Mayor of Yangon; 2016–2021	Succeeded by Bo Htay
