= Aung Thein Lin =

Burmese politician

- အောင်သိန်းလင်း

Pyithu Hluttaw MP
- In office 31 January 2011 – 29 January 2016
- Preceded by: New Office
- Succeeded by: Than Win
- Constituency: South Okkalapa Township

4th Mayor of Yangon
- In office 27 August 2003 – 30 March 2011
- Preceded by: Ko Lay
- Succeeded by: Hla Myint

Deputy minister of Ministry of Industry 2

Personal details
- Born: 10 July 1949 (age 77) Yangon, Myanmar
- Party: USDP
- Spouse: Khin San Nwe
- Education: Defence Services Academy

Military service
- Allegiance: Myanmar
- Branch/service: Myanmar Army
- Years of service: 197?–2010
- Rank: Brigadier General
- Commands: Light Infantry Division 101

Aung Thein Lin (Burmese: အောင်သိန်းလင်း [àʊɰ̃ θéɪɰ̃ lɪ́ɰ̃]; also spelled Aung Thein Linn) is a Burmese politician, and a member of parliament at the Pyithu Hluttaw from the South Okkalapa constituency. The former brigadier general in the Myanmar Army was mayor of Yangon from 2000 to 2010. He was a major in the military in 1988 and later became the commander of Light Infantry Division 101 and then deputy minister of Industry-2 as well as an executive of the junta’s mass organization, the Union Solidarity and Development Association (USDA), which was transformed into the Union Solidarity and Development Party in April 2010.

Political offices
| Preceded by Ko Lay | Mayor of Yangon; 2003-2011 | Succeeded by Hla Myint |
