= Ko Lay =

Past Myanmar mayor

- ကိုလေး

3rd Mayor of Yangon
- In office 7 September 1988 – 26 August 2003
- Preceded by: Aung Khin
- Succeeded by: Aung Thein Lin

Personal details
- Born: 31 October 1931 (age 94)
- Party: SPDC
- Spouse: Khin Khin
- Education: Defence Services Academy

Military service
- Allegiance: Myanmar
- Branch/service: Myanmar Army
- Rank: Colonel

Ko Lay (Burmese: ကိုလေး, pronounced [kò lé]; born 31 October 1931) was mayor of Yangon from 1988 to 2003.

Political offices
Preceded by Aung Khin	Mayor of Yangon; 1988-2003	Succeeded by Aung Thein Lin
