= Seikkyi Kanaungto Township =

Township of Yangon, Myanmar

Seikkyi Kanaungto Township ဆိပ်ကြီးခနောင်တို မြို့နယ်
- Township of Yangon
- Seikkyi Kanaungto Township
- Seikkyi Kanaungto Township in Twante District

- Location within Myanmar
- Country: Myanmar
- Region: Yangon Region
- City: Yangon
- District: Twante District

Area
  - Total: 3.04 sq mi (7.9 km^{2})
- Elevation: 8 ft (2.4 m)

Population (2023)
  - Total: 40,559
  - Density: 13,300/sq mi (5,150/km^{2})
- Time zone: UTC6:30 (MST)
- Postal codes: 11271
- Area codes: 1 (mobile: 80, 99)

Seikkyi Kanaungto Township (Burmese: ဆိပ်ကြီးခနောင်တို မြို့နယ် [sʰeɪʔtɕí kʰənàʊɰ̃tò mjo̰nɛ̀]) is located on the southwestern bank of Yangon river across from downtown Yangon, Myanmar. It is the only township fully under the Yangon City Development Committee administration to be south of the Yangon River. The township comprises 9 wards, and is bounded by the Yangon river in the north, the Twante Canal in the east, and Twante Township in the south and west. The township entirely urban, but is mostly relies on agriculture and manual labour, remaining undeveloped lacking easy bridge access across the Yangon river to downtown.

Seikkyi Kanaungto has 16 primary schools, and one high school.
