= Phyo Min Thein =

Burmese politician

His Excellency Phyo Min Thein
- ဖြိုးမင်းသိန်း
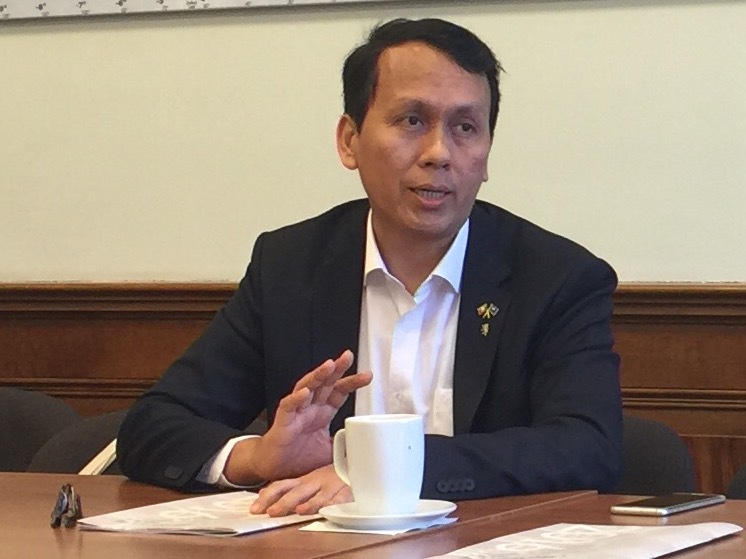

2nd Chief Minister of Yangon Region
- In office 30 March 2016 – 1 February 2021
- President: Win Myint
- Preceded by: Myint Swe
- Succeeded by: Soe Thein

Member of the Yangon Region Hluttaw
- In office 8 February 2016 – 1 February 2021
- Constituency: Hlegu Township Constituency № 2

Member of the Pyithu Hluttaw
- In office 2 May 2012 – 29 January 2016
- Succeeded by: Thein Tan
- Constituency: Hlegu Township

Personal details
- Born: 13 April 1969 (age 57) Yangon, Burma
- Party: Democratic Party for a New Society (1988–90); People Democracy Party (2010); Union Democratic Party (2010); National League for Democracy (2012–2023)
- Spouse: Khin Mi Mi Kywe (m. 2009)
- Parent(s): Khin Tun; Khin Khin Aye
- Education: Yangon University (no degree)
- Occupation: Politician

Phyo Min Thein (Burmese: ဖြိုးမင်းသိန်း; born 13 April 1969) is a Burmese politician and former political prisoner who served as Chief Minister of Yangon Region and Yangon Region Parliament from 2016 to 2021. He also served as an MP for Hlegu Township Constituency No. 2. Previously, he was the chairman of Union Democratic Party and founder of the People's Democracy Party which later merged with Union Democratic Party.

== Early life ==
Phyo Min Thein was born on 13 April 1969 in Yangon. He was the youngest of four children born to Khin Tun and Khin Khin Aye. He studied at Yangon University but did not graduate.

== Political career ==
=== Early political career ===
In 1988, Phyo Min Thein was a second year physics major at the Botahtaung campus of Yangon University when the 8888 Uprising began, and he became the secretary of the Thanlyin Township All Burma Federation of Student Unions (ABSFU). During the uprising, he was one of the leaders of the Botahtaung campus and Thanlyin Township anti-government protests. He helped found the Democratic Party for a New Society in 1988. Phyo Min Thein was arrested on 20 January 1991 for his involvement in 8888 Uprising and sentenced to seven years imprisonment in May 1991. In 1995, during his time in prison, the military government added another seven years to his sentence. In 2001, the government extended another seven years to his sentence. He was eventually released on 6 July 2005.

Phyo Min Thein was a chairman of Union Democratic Party and also a founder of People Democracy Party which was later merged with Union Democratic Party. He was elected for a parliamentary seat in the lower house (Pyithu Hluttaw)'s Hlegu constituency in the 2012 by-elections, representing the National League for Democracy.

=== Chief Minister ===
In 2015 general election, he was elected for a parliamentary seat in Yangon Region Parliament. He was appointed as Chief Minister of Yangon Region on 30 March 2016.

His decision to restrict the 2016 Burmese New Year Water Festival pandals in Yangon soon after he took office as Chief Minister was challenged by several people. In May 2016, he ordered a controversial decision to crack down on nightlife in Yangon, which resulted a public backlash.

In May 2016, he made hard line decisions to suspend around 70 high-rise construction projects and tightening regulations against drinking establishments. The decision was criticized by real estate developers and some lawmakers.

In January 2017, he launched Yangon Bus Service (YBS) to overhaul the bus network of Yangon. However, YBS amid criticism of being ill-equipped to serve commuters, shortage of buses, the misconduct of bus staff, and constant violations of traffic rules. On 7 April 2017, lawmakers from Yangon Region Parliament called for a transparent review of the YBS. On 24 and 27 April 2017, he was conspicuously absent from the debate session on YBS review proposal, so some lawmakers accused him of disrespecting Parliament. On 27 April, 117 lawmakers approved the review proposal after a heated debate by 26 legislators.

On 8 March 2019, news reports stated Phyo Min Thein's affiliations with Kyaw Ne Win and Aye Ne Win, the grandsons of Myanmar's former dictator U Ne Win, regarding the financing of US$36.8 million for the acquisition of buses for the YBS. It was reported that the loan was sought at the Phyo Min Thein's recommendation, and that the local bank was preparing to sue the YBS consortium for violating its payment deadline.

In the wake of the 1 February 2021 Myanmar coup d'état, Phyo Min Thein and his wife were detained by the Myanmar Armed Forces. The military regime released Phyo Min Thein with a fine of 100,000 MMK ($40 USD) for electoral fraud, in exchange for testifying against Aung San Suu Kyi in a corruption case.

On March 3, 2023, Phyo Min Thein and three other central committee members were expelled from the National League for Democracy (NLD) for rejecting the will of the people and NLD policies by supporting the terrorist regime's sham election.

== Personal life ==
Phyo Min Thein married Khin Mi Mi Kywe in 2009. He is a brother-in-law of Htay Kywe, a pro-democracy activist and one of the leaders of 8888 Uprising.

Political offices
Preceded by Myint Swe	Chief Minister of Yangon Region; 2016–1 February 2021	Incumbent
