= Yangon Region Hluttaw =

Yangon Region Hluttaw ရန်ကုန်တိုင်းဒေသကြီးလွှတ်တော်
- 3rd Yangon Region Hluttaw

Type
- Type: Unicameral

History
- Founded: 8 February 2016

Leadership
- Speaker: Htay Aung, USDP since 28 December 2025
- Deputy Speaker: Kyaw Kyaw Soe, USDP since 28 December 2025

Structure
- Seats: 123; 92 elected MPs; 31 military appointees
- Political groups: National League for Democracy (88)* Military (31); Union Solidarity and Development Party (3) Arakan National Party (1)*

Elections
- Last election: 8 November 2015

Meeting place
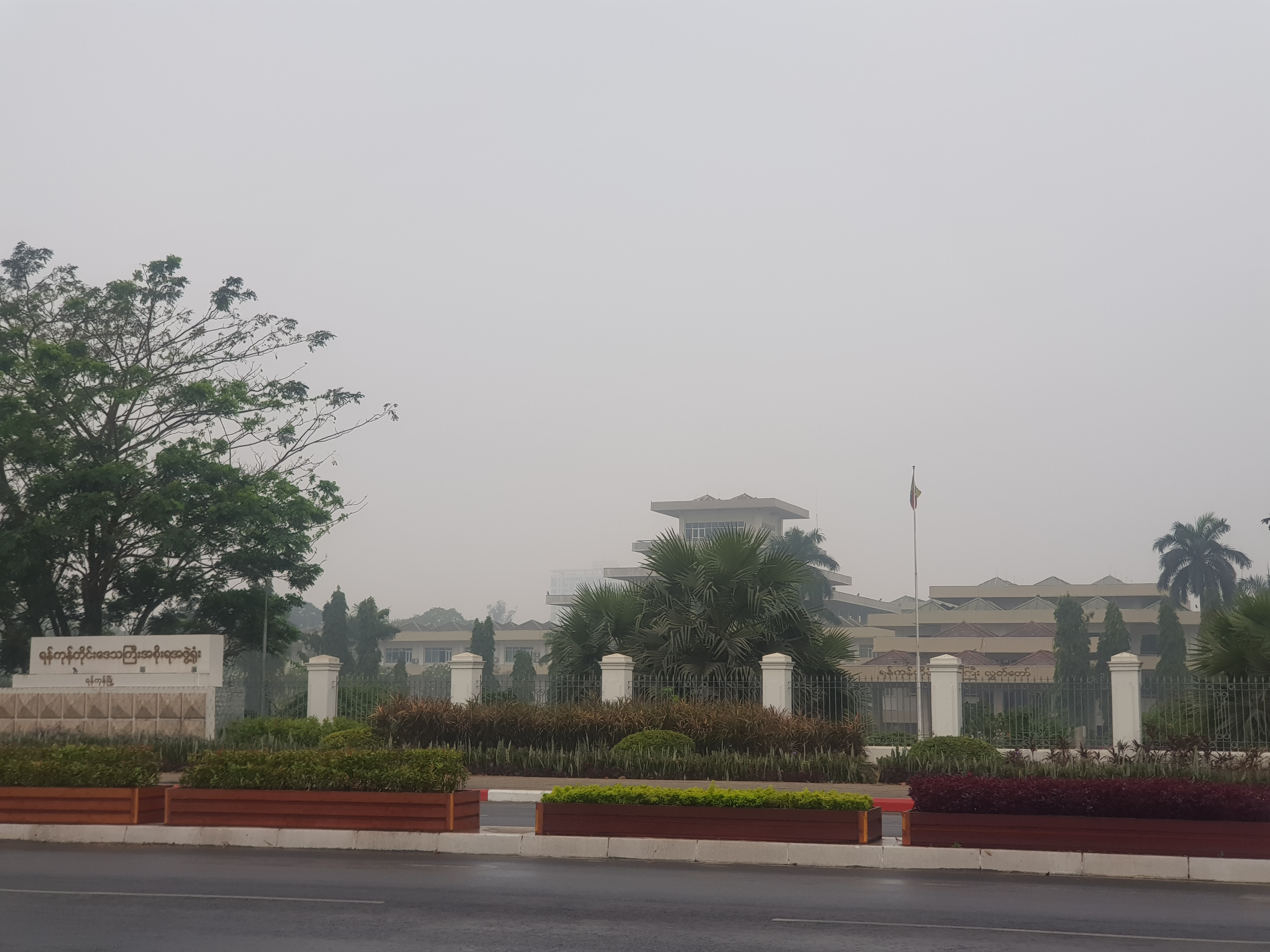
- Region Hluttaw Meeting Hall; Pyay Road, Yangon, Myanmar

Footnotes
- Includes one 'Ethnic Minister (Kayin)' from the NLD and one 'Ethnic Minister (Rakhine)' from the ANP.

Yangon Region Hluttaw (Burmese: ရန်ကုန်တိုင်းဒေသကြီးလွှတ်တော်; lit. 'Yangon Region Assembly') is the legislature of Myanmar's Yangon Region. It is a unicameral body, consisting of 123 members, including 92 elected members and 31 military representatives. As of February 2016, the Hluttaw was led by speaker Tin Maung Tun of the National League for Democracy (NLD).

The regional legislature convenes at the Yangon Region Hluttaw building on Pyay Road in Dagon Township. The building formerly housed the national parliament.

In 2013, the Yangon Region Hluttaw adopted the 2013 Yangon City Municipal Law, which holds the Yangon City Development Committee and the Yangon city mayor accountable to the legislature, including its budgetary power.

Following the general elections in 2015, the Yangon Region Hluttaw saw a near clean-sweep by the NLD, winning all but four of the seats contested in the election.

== General Election results (Nov. 2015) ==
Party	Seats	+/–
National League for Democracy (NLD)	88	▲88
Union Solidarity and Development Party (USDP)	3	▼72
Arakan National Party (ANP; also known as the 'Rakhine National Party' (RNP))	1	▲1
National Unity Party (NUP)	0	▼8
Democratic Party (DPM)	0	▼2
National Democratic Force (NDF)	0	▼2
New National Democracy Party (NNDP)	0	▼2
The 88 Generation Student Youths (Union of Myanmar) (88GSY)	0	▼1
Kayin People's Party (KPP)	0	▼1
Rakhine Nationals Progressive Party (RNPP)	0	▼1
Military appointed	31	
Total	123	

== See also ==
- State and Region Hluttaws
- Pyidaungsu Hluttaw
- Amyotha Hluttaw
- Pyithu Hluttaw
