= Pyinmana =

Pyinmana ပျဉ်းမနားမြို့
- Town
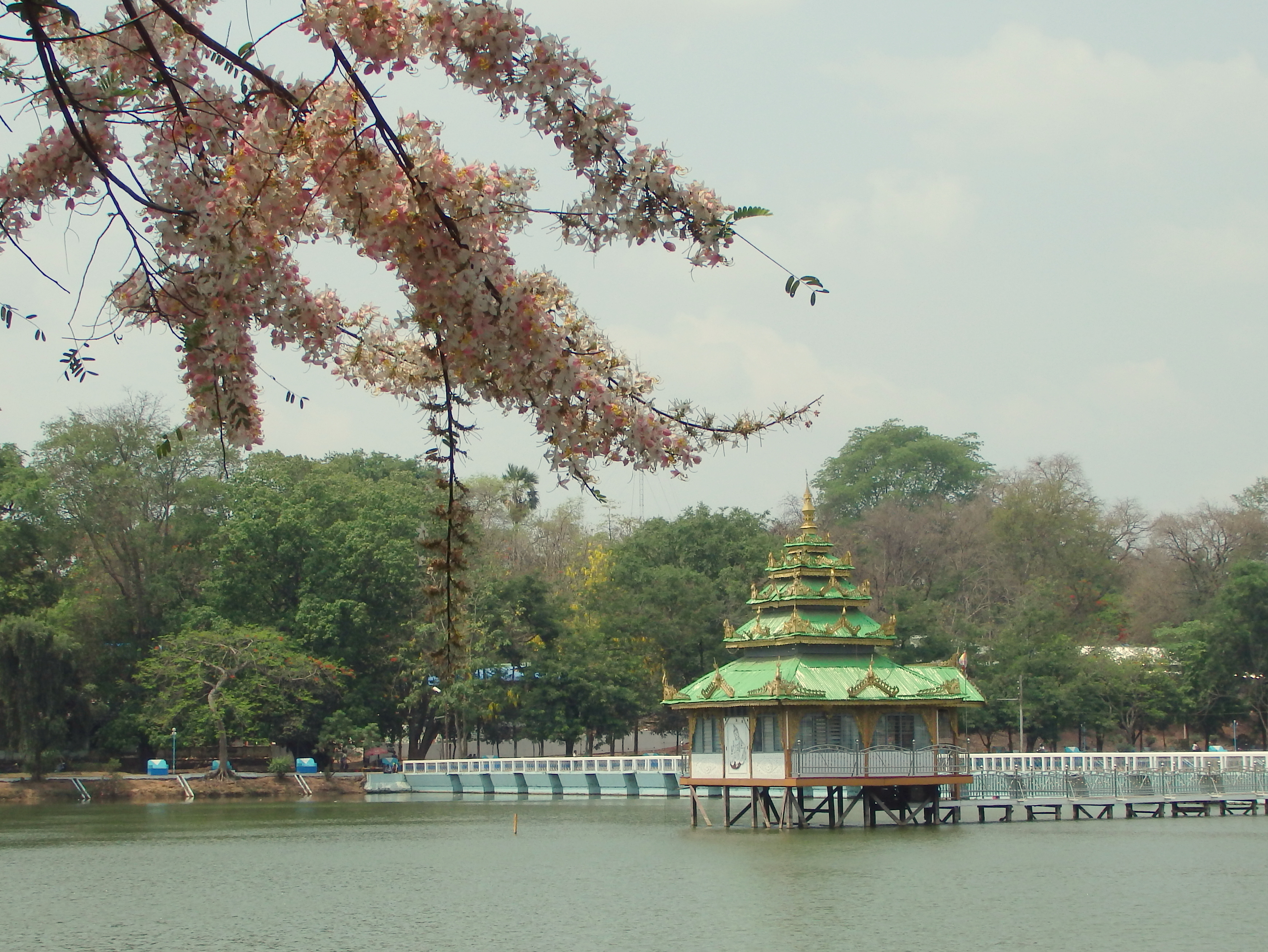

- Location of Pyinmana, Myanmar (Burma)
- Coordinates: 19°45′N 96°12′E
- Country: Myanmar
- Territory: Naypyidaw Union Territory
- District: Pyinmana District
- District: Pyinmana Township

Population (2006 est.)
  - Total: 100,001
  - Ethnicities: Bamar Burmese Indians Kayin
  - Religions: Theravada Buddhism Islam
- Time zone: UTC+6.30 (MMT)

Pyinmana (Burmese: ပျဉ်းမနားမြို့, MLCTS: pyanymana: mrui., pronounced [pjɪ́ɰ̃məná mjo̰]; population: 100,000 (2006 estimate)) is a logging town and sugarcane refinery center in the Naypyidaw Union Territory of Myanmar. The administrative capital of Myanmar was officially moved to a militarized greenfield site (which the leader, Than Shwe, dubbed Naypyidaw, or Royal City) two miles (3.2 km) west of Pyinmana on November 6, 2005. As of 2014, the city has an urban population of 72,010.

During World War II, Pyinmana was the base of the Burma Independence Army (later renamed and reorganized into the Burma Defence Army by the Japanese).

== Climate ==
Pyinmana has a tropical savanna climate with a dry winter (Köppen-Geiger climate type Aw). This means that it has a clear wet season and a clear dry season.

Climate data for Pyinmana (1991–2020)
Month	Jan	Feb	Mar	Apr	May	Jun	Jul	Aug	Sep	Oct	Nov	Dec	Year
Mean daily maximum °C (°F)	31.6 (88.9)	34.5 (94.1)	37.4 (99.3)	38.8 (101.8)	36.1 (97.0)	32.7 (90.9)	31.5 (88.7)	31.3 (88.3)	32.6 (90.7)	33.3 (91.9)	32.5 (90.5)	31.0 (87.8)	33.6 (92.5)
Daily mean °C (°F)	23.3 (73.9)	25.5 (77.9)	29.0 (84.2)	31.6 (88.9)	30.5 (86.9)	28.5 (83.3)	27.8 (82.0)	27.7 (81.9)	28.3 (82.9)	28.4 (83.1)	26.5 (79.7)	23.7 (74.7)	27.6 (81.7)
Mean daily minimum °C (°F)	15.0 (59.0)	16.4 (61.5)	20.6 (69.1)	24.3 (75.7)	24.8 (76.6)	24.3 (75.7)	24.1 (75.4)	24.0 (75.2)	24.1 (75.4)	23.5 (74.3)	20.5 (68.9)	16.5 (61.7)	21.5 (70.7)
Average precipitation mm (inches)	4.9 (0.19)	5.2 (0.20)	5.7 (0.22)	33.7 (1.33)	151.6 (5.97)	215.5 (8.48)	230.9 (9.09)	273.1 (10.75)	177.9 (7.00)	160.1 (6.30)	38.9 (1.53)	9.2 (0.36)	1,306.6 (51.44)
Average precipitation days (≥ 1.0 mm)	0.7	0.4	0.9	3.0	10.1	17.0	18.9	21.2	14.7	10.3	2.4	0.8	100.5
Source: World Meteorological Organization

== Notable residents ==
- Bo Let Ya, (1911-1978) Army general

== See also ==
- Pyinmana Township
