= Kyaw San =

Mayor of Mandalay

Thiri Pyanchi Kyaw San
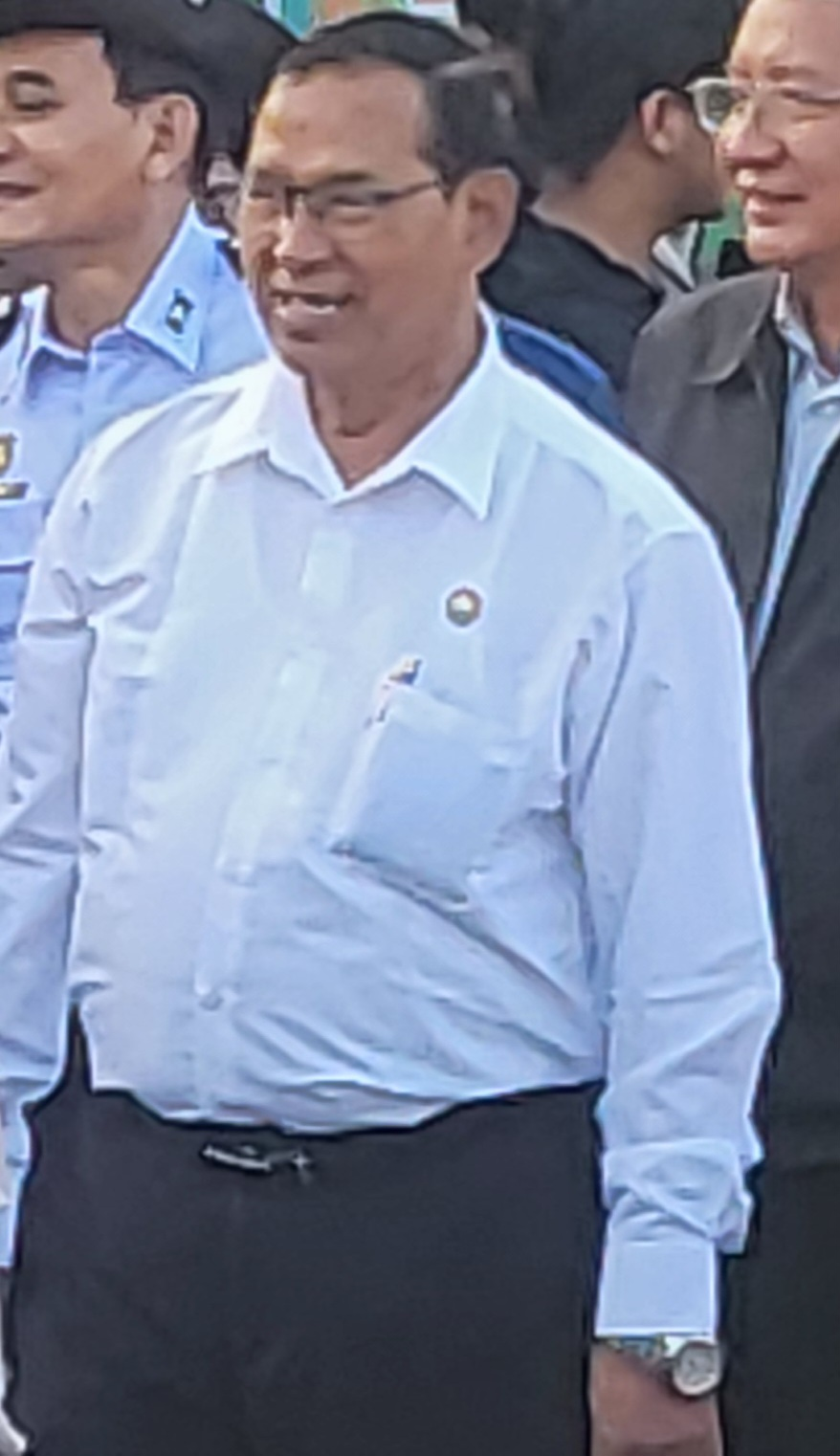
- Kyaw San in February 2024

Mayor of Mandalay
- In office 7 February 2021 – 10 April 2026
- Preceded by: Ye Lwin
- Succeeded by: Khin Maung Aye

Chairman of Mandalay City Development Committee
- In office 7 February 2021 – 10 April 2026
- Preceded by: Ye Lwin
- Succeeded by: Khin Aung Aye

Municipal Minister for Mandalay Region
- In office 1 August 2021 – 10 April 2026
- Chief Minister: Maung Ko; Myo Aung
- Preceded by: Ye Lwin

Road and Transport Minister for Mandalay Region
- In office 2011–2016
- Chief Minister: Ye Myint
- Preceded by: Position established

Kyaw San or Kyaw Hsan (Burmese: ကျော်ဆန်း) is a Burmese politician and the current mayor of Mandalay, the second-largest city in Myanmar. He also serves as the minister of the Ministry of Municipal Affairs in the Mandalay Region Government under Maung Ko. Previously, he served as Regional Minister of Road Transport from 2011 to 2016.

== Mayoral career ==
Following the coup d'état on February 1, 2021, the State Administration Council appointed Kyaw San as mayor. After the formation of the caretaker government on August 1, 2021, the mayors of Yangon and Mandalay were appointed as municipal ministers in the reformation of state and region governments.
