= Zabuthiri Township =

Township in Naypyidaw Union Territory, Myanmar

Zabuthiri Township ဇမ္ဗူသီရိမြို့နယ်
- Township
- Zabuthiri Township (red) in Pyinmana District
- Coordinates: 19.7460°N 96.0985°E
- Country: Myanmar
- Territory: Naypyidaw Union Territory
- District: Pyinmana District
- Time zone: UTC+6:30 (MMT)

Zabuthiri Township (Burmese: ဇမ္ဗူသီရိမြို့နယ်) is one of Naypyidaw Union Territory's eight townships, located south of Mandalay Region in Burma.

== History ==
Zabuthiri Township was formed from part of Mandalay Division's Lewe and Pyinmana Townships.

Zabuthiri is derived from Pali jambūsiri, and literally means "splendor of the rose apple."

== Demographics ==
=== 2014 ===
Historical population
Year	Pop.	±%
2014	110,459	—

The 2014 Myanmar Census reported that Zabuthiri Township had a population of 110,459. The population density was 1,659.4 people per km^{2}. The census reported that the median age was 29.3 years, and 87 males per 100 females. There were 26,320 households; the mean household size was 3.5.

=== Ethnic makeup ===
Ethnic composition of Zabuthiri Township
Ethnic group	Percentage
Bamar	98.2%
Rakhine	0.5%
Kayin	0.4%
Shan	0.2%
Chin	0.2%
Mon	0.2%
Others	0.1%
Kachin	0.1%
Source: 2019 GAD township reports

The Bamar make up 98% of the township's population.
