= Ottarathiri Township =

Township of Naypyidaw Union Territory, Myanmar

Ottarathiri Township ဥတ္တရသီရိမြို့နယ်
- Township
- Ottarathiri Township (red) in Ottara District
- Coordinates: 19.7840°N 96.0561°E
- Country: Myanmar
- Territory: Naypyidaw Union Territory
- District: Ottara District
- Time zone: UTC+6:30 (MMT)

Ottarathiri Township (ဥတ္တရသီရိမြို့နယ်) is one of Naypyidaw Union Territory's eight townships, located south of Mandalay Region in Myanmar.

== History ==
7 village tracts, consisting of 39 villages from Pyinmana Township, and 3 village tracts, consisting of 9 villages from Tatkon Township were separated to form Ottarathiri Township.

Ottarathiri is derived from Pali uttarasiri, and literally means "splendor of the north."

== Demographics ==
=== 2014 ===
Historical Population
| Year | Pop. | ±% |
|---|---|---|
| 2014 | 81,620 | — |

The 2014 Myanmar Census reported that Ottarathiri Township had a population of 81,620. The population density was 98.2 people per km^{2}. The census reported that the median age was 25.6 years, and 103 males per 100 females. There were 18,661 households; the mean household size was 4.1.

=== Ethnic makeup ===
Ethnic composition of Ottarathiri Township
| Ethnic group | Percentage |
| Bamar | 99.9% |
| Others | 0.1% |
Source: 2019 GAD township report

The Bamar effectively make up the entirety of the township's population.
