= Tatkon, Naypyidaw Union Territory =

Tatkon
- Town
- Location in Burma
- Coordinates: 20°7′N 96°13′E
- Country: Myanmar
- Region: Naypyidaw Union Territory
- Township: Tatkon Township

Population
  - Religions: Buddhism
- Time zone: UTC+6.30 (MST)

Tatkon is a town in Tatkon Township, Naypyidaw Union Territory, central Myanmar.
