= Pyinmana District =

District of Naypyidaw, Myanmar

Pyinmana District ပျဉ်းမနားခရိုင်
- Pyinmana District (Red) in the Naypyidaw Union Territory
- Coordinates: 19.67°N 96.367°E
- Country: Myanmar
- Territory: Naypyidaw Union Territory
- Capital: Naypyidaw
- Time zone: MMT

Pyinmana District (Burmese: ပျဉ်းမနားခရိုင်) is a district of the Naypyidaw Union Territory and is home to central Naypyidaw, the capital of Myanmar. The modern district was reformed in 2022, splitting off from Dekkhina District and consists of two townships: Zabuthiri Township and Pyinmana Township.

The district was initially a part of Mandalay Division, Myanmar. It was renamed as Naypyidaw District by the 2008 Constitution of Myanmar. In 2011, it was separated from Mandalay Region and organized under as part of the Naypyidaw Union Territory. In 2013, Naypyidaw district was divided into two districts, Dekkhina and Ottara.

== History ==
Naypyidaw District (2009–2013)

Prior to 2008, Yamethin District was a district of Mandalay Division consisting of 5 townships: Yamethin, Pyawbwe, Pyinmana, Lewe and Tatkon. In 2006, the new capital Naypyidaw was built in the village of KyatPyay, located near the town of Pyinmana. In February 2006, Pyinmana Township, Tatkon Township and Lewe Township were separated from Yamethin District and formed as Pyinmana District. On 26 November 2008, some areas of those 3 townships were separated to form Naypyidaw Township with 16 wards and 202 villages. On 28 January 2009, Pyinmana District was renamed Naypyidaw District (Burmese: နေပြည်တော်ခရိုင်). On 26 March 2009, Naypyidaw Township was divided into five new Thiri Townships and the Union territory was expanded to a total of 8 townships, including Pyinmana Township.

According to the 2008 Constitution, Union Territory was formed with one district and eight townships. On 11 January 2013, Naypyidaw District was divided into two districts, Dekkhina and Ottara.

Then in 2022, the two districts of Naypyidaw were divided once again with the new southeastern district comprising Pyinmana and Zabuthiri townships being given the old name Pyinmana Township.
