= Ayeyeiknyein Cemetery =

- Interactive map of Ayeyeiknyein Cemetery

Details
- Location: Kyanigan, Mandalay Region
- Country: Myanmar
- Coordinates: 22.086285°N 96.154578°E
- Type: Public
- Owned by: Mandalay City Development Committee (MCDC)

Ayeyeiknyein Cemetery (Burmese: အေးရိပ်ငြိမ်သုဿန်), commonly known as the Kyanikan Cemetery, is a publicly owned cemetery and crematorium in Mandalay Region, Myanmar. It is operated by the Mandalay City Development Committee (MCDC).

The final rites of the Shwegyin Nikaya Thathanabaing Manitasiri were held at the cemetery in June 2018.
