= Pobbathiri Township =

Pobbathiri Township ပုဗ္ဗသီရိမြို့နယ်
- Township
- Pobbathiri Township (red) in Zeyathiri District
- Coordinates: 19.8959°N 96.1899°E
- Country: Myanmar
- Territory: Naypyidaw Union Territory
- District: Zeyathiri District
- Time zone: UTC+6:30 (MMT)

Pobbathiri Township (Burmese: ပုဗ္ဗသီရိမြို့နယ်) is one of Naypyidaw Union Territory's eight townships, located south of Mandalay Region in Myanmar.

== History ==
Pobbathiri Township formerly part of Mandalay Division. The township was designated as one of the original townships constituting the new capital region of Naypyidaw on 26 November 2008 by the Ministry of Home Affairs (MOHA).

Pobbathiri is derived from Pali pubbāsiri, and literally means "splendor of the east."

== Demographics ==
=== 2014 ===
Historical population
Year	Pop.	±%
2014	116,491	—

The 2014 Myanmar Census reported that Pobbathiri Township had a population of 116,491. The population density was 482.9 people per km^{2}. The census reported that the median age was 26.0 years, and 97 males per 100 females. There were 27,616 households; the mean household size was 4.0.

=== Ethnic makeup ===
Ethnic composition of Pobbathiri Township
Ethnic group	Percentage
Bamar	99.9%
Others	0.1%
Source: 2019 GAD township report

The Bamar effectively make up the entirety of the township's population.
