= Leiktho =

- Location in Myanmar (Burma)
- Coordinates: 19°13′20″N 96°34′52″E
- Country: Myanmar
- State: Kayin State
- District: Hpa-an District
- Township: Thandaunggyi Township

Population (2014)
  - Total: 48,606
  - Religions: Buddhism
- Time zone: UTC+6.30 (MMT)
- Area code: 58

Leiktho (Burmese: လိပ်သိုမြို့) is a town in Thandaunggyi Township, Hpa-an District, in Kayin State, Myanmar. In the 2014 census, the town had a population of 48606.
