= Ottara District =

District of the Naypyidaw Union Territory in Myanmar

Ottara District ဥတ္တရခရိုင်
- Ottara District (Red) in the Naypyidaw Union Territory
- Coordinates: 20.003°N 94.037°E
- Country: Myanmar
- Territory: Naypyidaw Union Territory
- Time zone: MMT

Ottara District (Burmese: ဥတ္တရခရိုင်, lit. 'Splendor of the North District') is a district of the Naypyidaw Union Territory in Myanmar.

The District has two townships:

- Ottarathiri Township
- Tatkon Township

In 2022, the district was split up to form the new Zeyathiri District. Prior to this, the district also included Zeyathiri Township and Pobbathiri Township.
