= Mandalay Convention Centre =

Convention center in Myanmar

- မန္တလေး ကွန်ဗင်းရှင်းစင်တာ
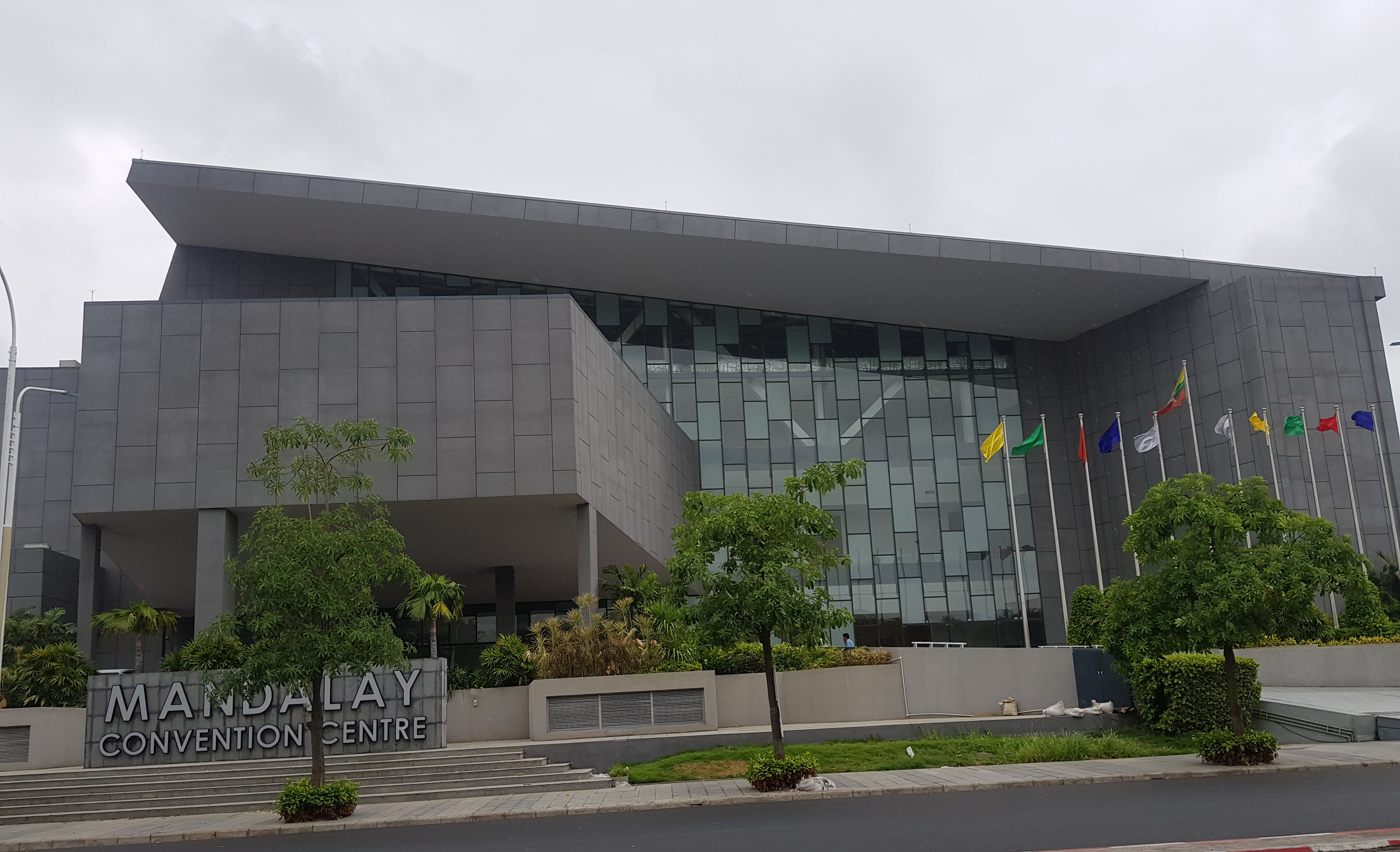
- MCC in 2019
- Interactive map of the Mandalay Convention Centre area

General information
- Type: RC
- Location: 101 Road and 72 street
- Coordinates: 21.9513°N 96.0967°E
- Construction started: 3 November 2014
- Opened: 13 March 2016 (soft opening); 9 November 2018 (grand opening)
- Cost: US$ 25 million
- Owner: Mandalay City Development Committee

Height
- Height: 386 ft (118 m)

Technical details
- Floor count: 3
- Lifts/elevators: 4 (Public)
- Grounds: 2.4 acres (0.97 ha)

Design and construction
- Architecture firm: Gensler
- Main contractor: Mandalay Investment and Development Group (CAD Construction and Decoration + New Star Light Construction)

Other information
- Parking: ground parking; underground parking

Mandalay Convention Centre (Burmese: မန္တလေးကွန်ဗင်ရှင်းစင်တာ) is a convention centre in Mandalay, Myanmar. It is one of four convention centers in Myanmar.

== History ==
Before the convention centre was built, Mandalay City Hall was used for large events. Later, due to the increase in demand, Mayor Aung Maung commissioned a new building in September 2012 and called for a tender. The construction began in 2014, under mayor Aung Maung. The building opened on November 9, 2018, under Ye Lwin. It was built at a cost of US$25 million.

== Construction ==
Mandalay Convention Center and Commercial Complex project occupies on a 14.78-acre plot of land, owned by MCDC. Construction is planned in three phases. The convention center is the first phase of the project. The Mandalay Convention Center is built on 2.38 acres of land, measuring 386 feet by 305 feet and is a four-story concrete and steel structure with floorspace of 220,000 square feet.

When the new government came to power in 2016, Mayor Ye Lwin inspected the project and found that the convention center was not acceptable, with only one large hall. The floor of the multi-purpose hall on the ground floor was initially cracked. Toilets were not equipped with sensors. Prior to the completion of construction, the escalator was repaired and the design of the building was changed.

=== Opening ===
The Convention Centre was pre-opened by chief minister of Mandalay Region Ye Myint and Mayor Aung Maung on 13 March 2016. The completed Convention Centre was opened on 9 November 2018.It was held in conjunction with the 2018 Mandalay Business Forum and Union Minister for Union Government Office and Chairman of Myanmar Investment Commission, Thaung Tun attended.Mandalay Region Chief Minister Zaw Myint Maung opened the sign of the Convention Centre.

== Gallery ==
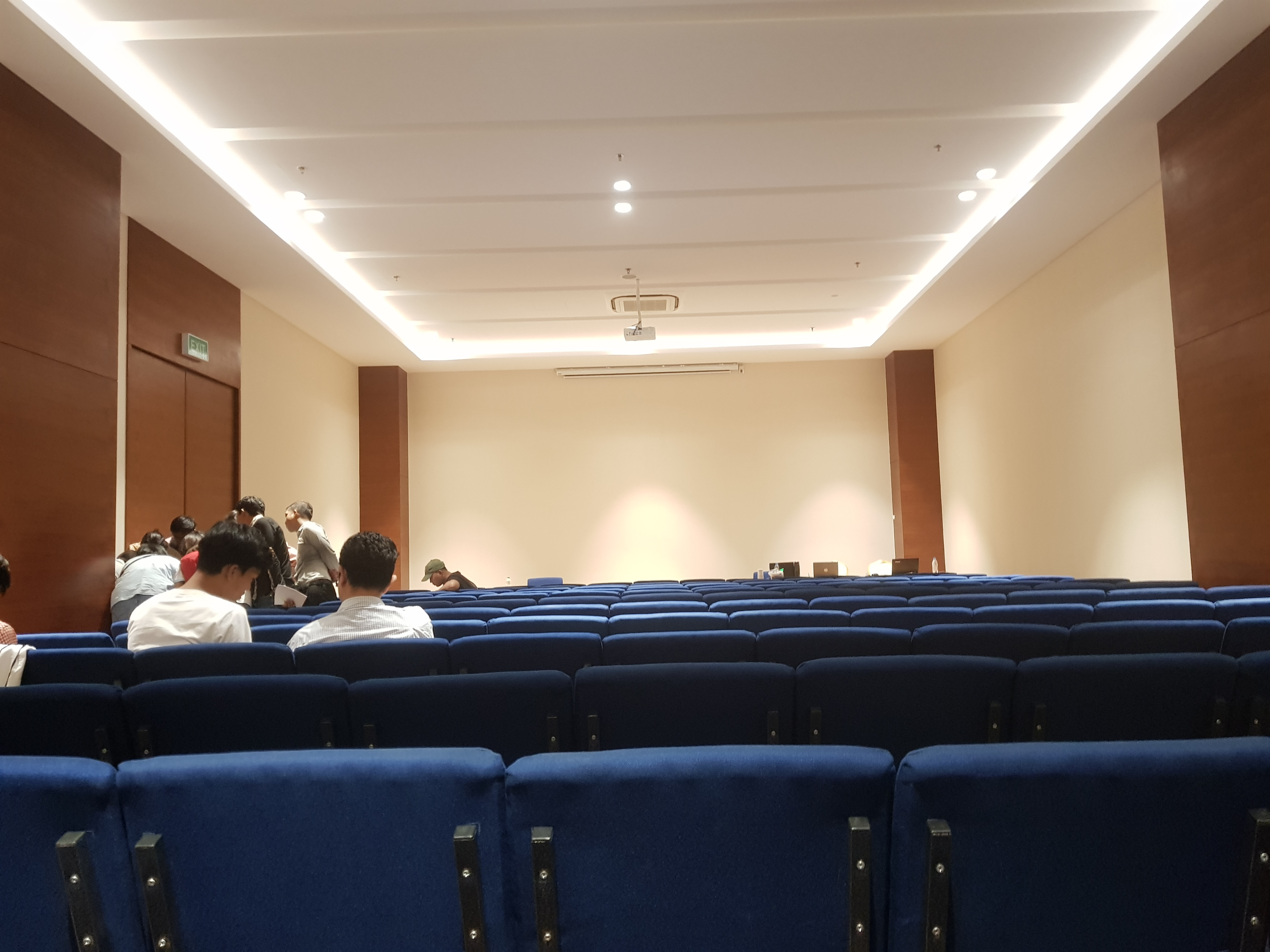
Meeting room

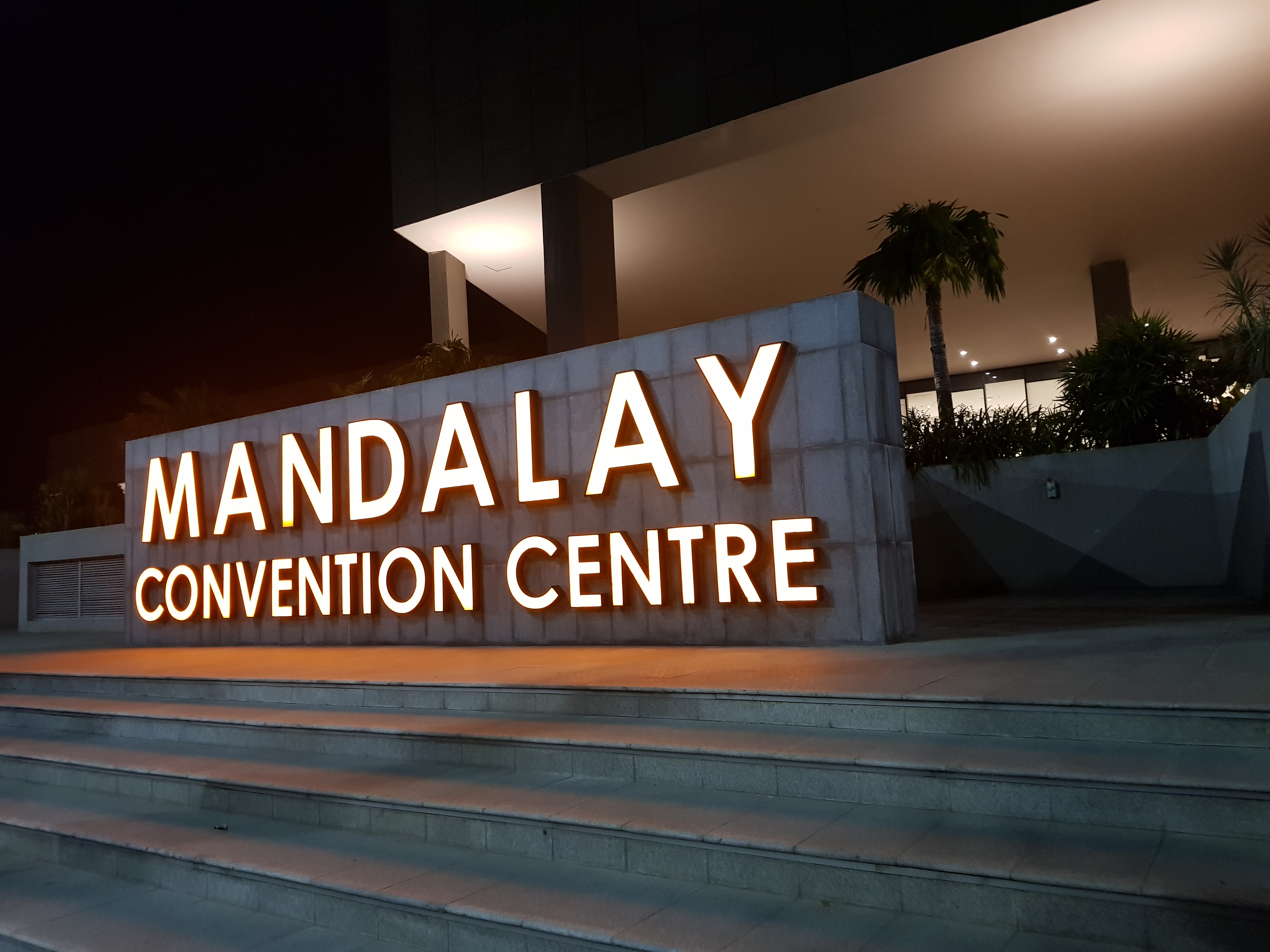

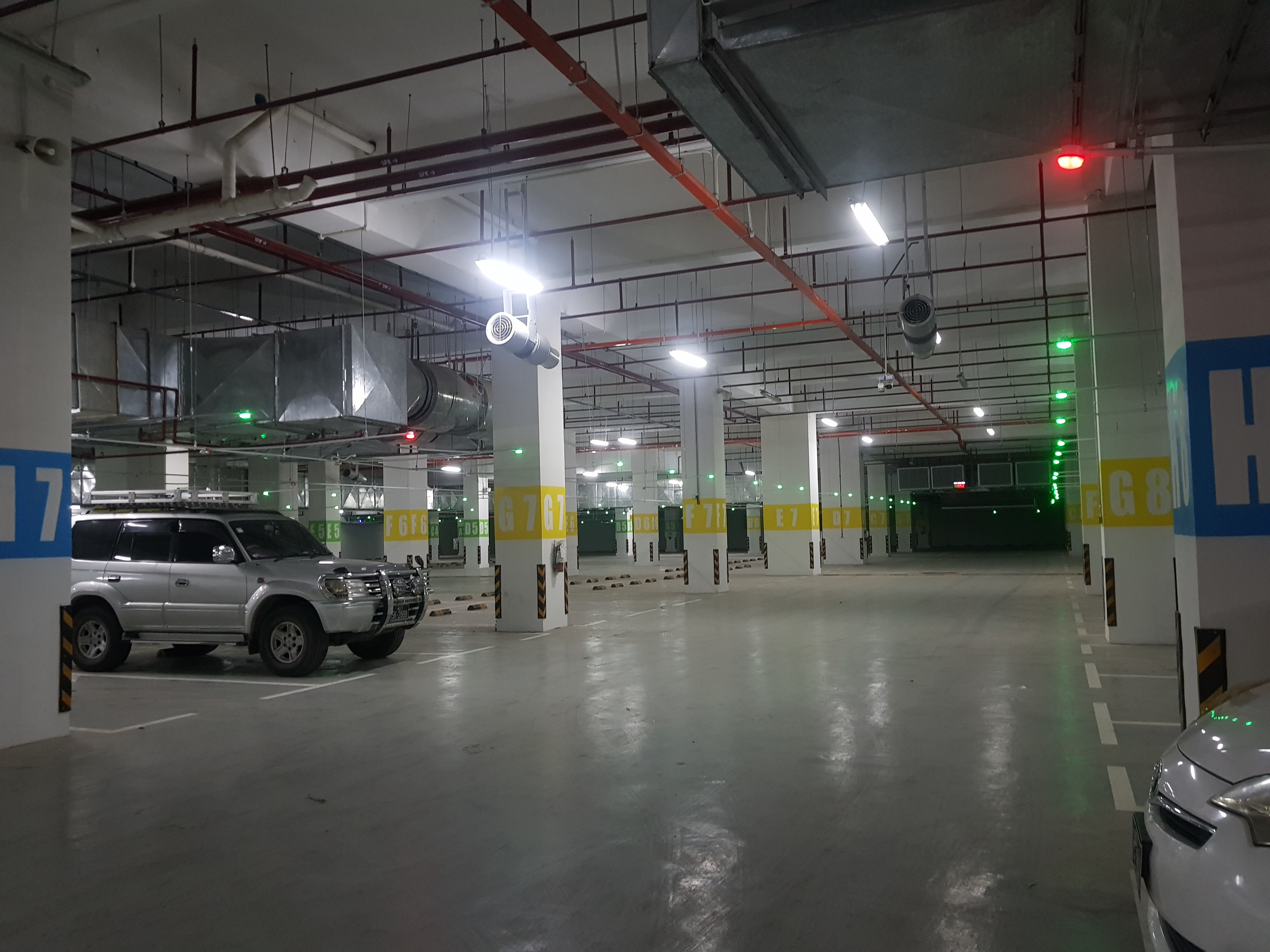
Underground car parking

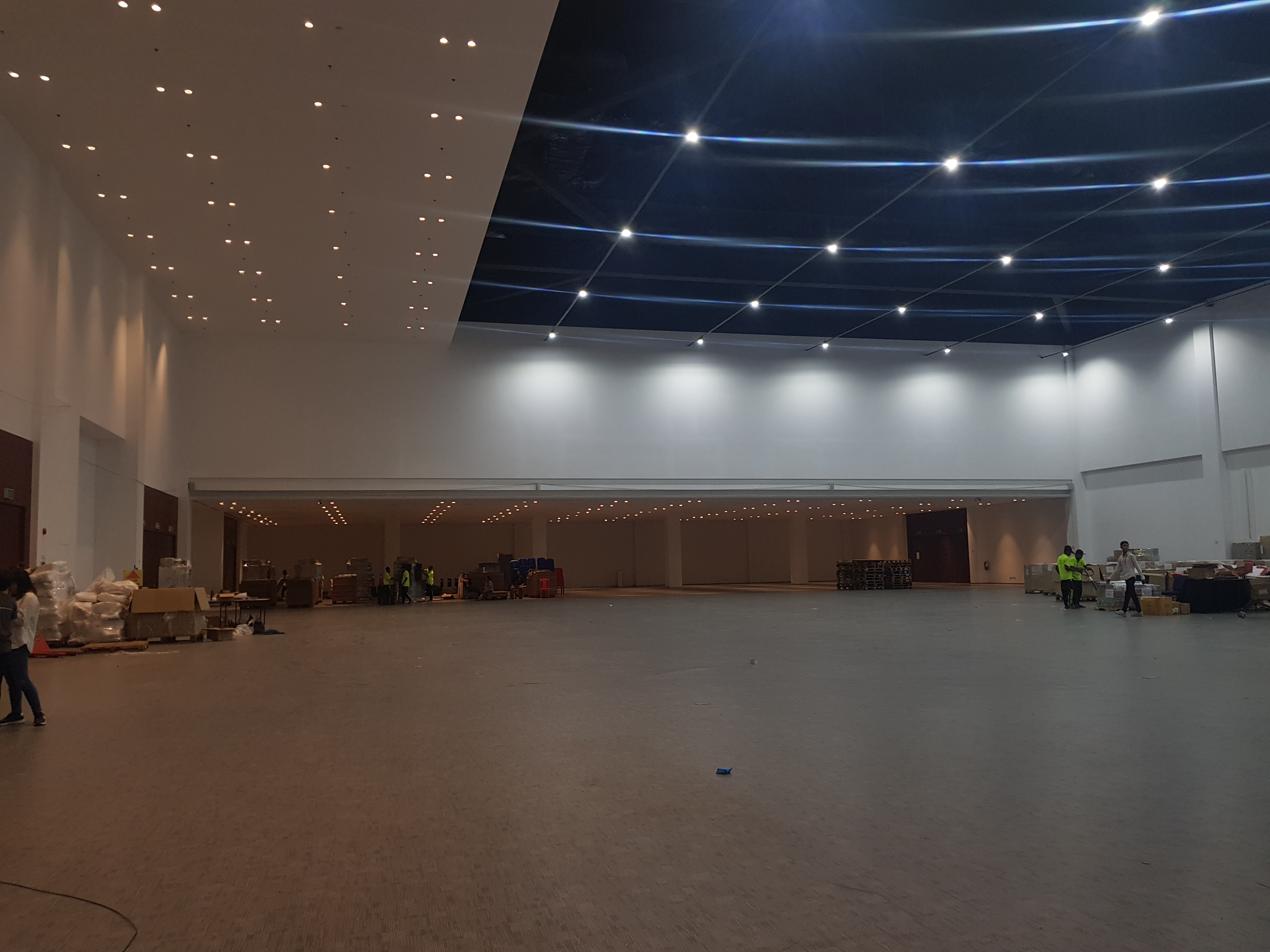
Multipurpose hall

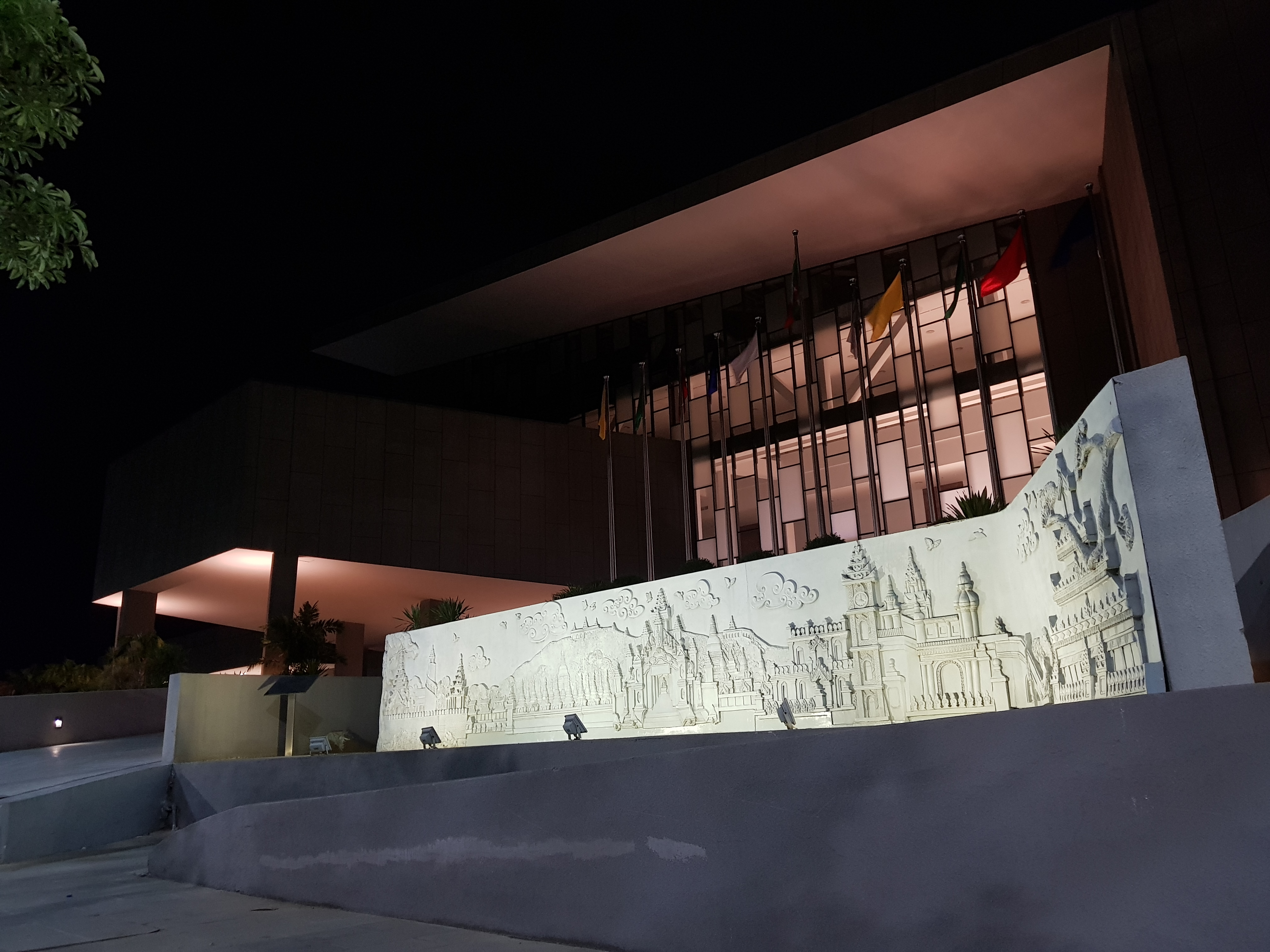
Night view

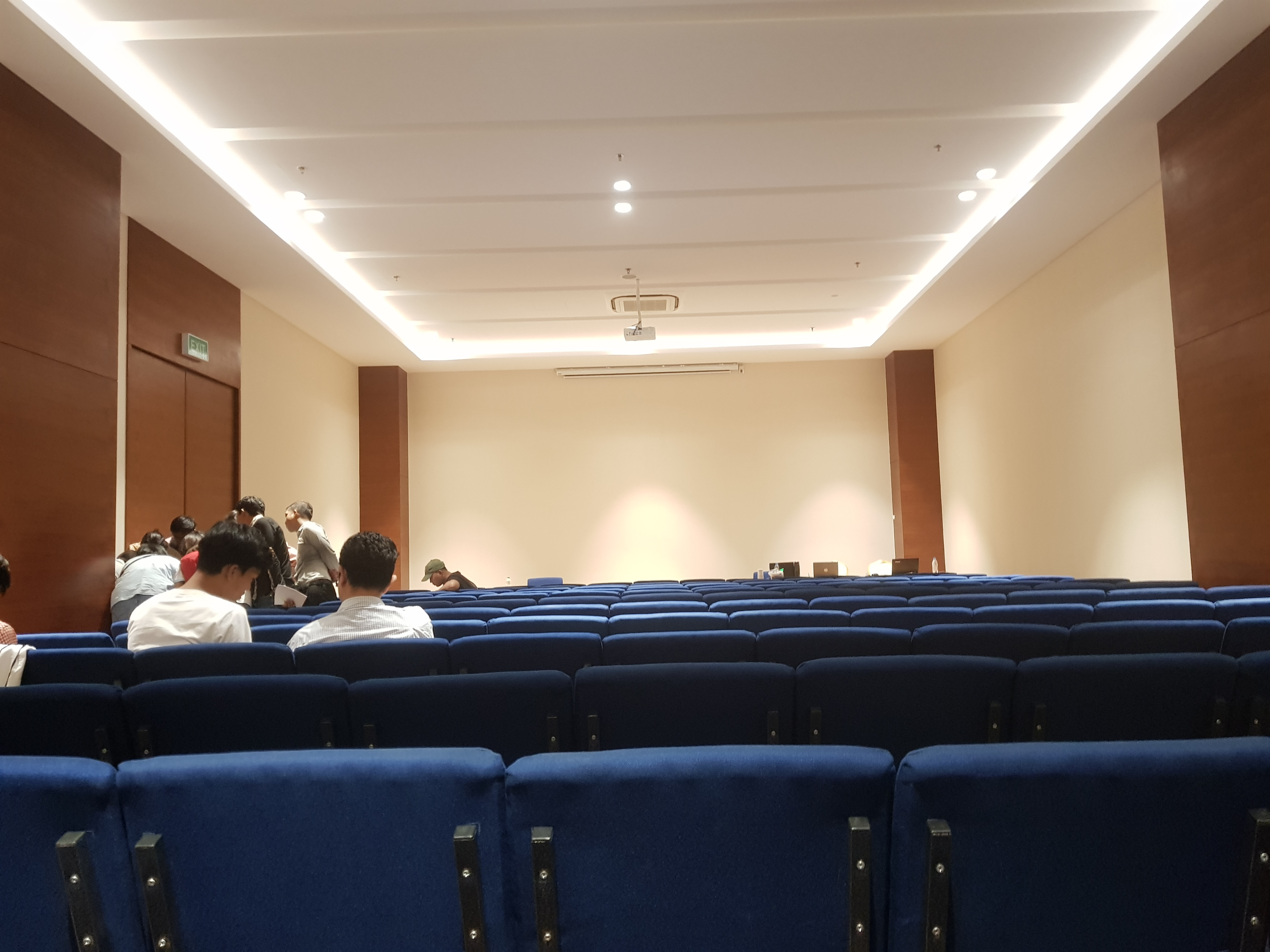
Meeting room
