= Dekkhina District =

District of the Naypyidaw Union Territory in Myanmar

Dekkhina District ဒက္ခိဏခရိုင်
- Dekkhina District (Red) in the Naypyidaw Union Territory
- Coordinates: 19.587°N 95.990°E
- Country: Myanmar
- Territory: Naypyidaw Union Territory
- Time zone: MMT

Dekkhina District (Burmese: ဒက္ခိဏခရိုင်; lit. 'Splendor of the South District') is a district of the Naypyidaw Union Territory in Myanmar. It is also called Lewe District (Burmese: လယ်ဝေးခရိုင်)

The District has two townships:

- Dekkhinathiri Township
- Lewe Township

In 2022, the district was split up to form the new Pyinmana District. Prior to this, the district also included Pyinmana Township and Zabuthiri Township.
