= Phone Zaw Han =

Former mayor of Myanmar's second largest city, Mandalay

H.E. Phone Zaw Han

Mayor of Mandalay and Chairman of Mandalay City Development Committee
- In office 1 February 2005 – 27 February 2012
- President: Thein Sein
- Preceded by: Sein Win Aung
- Succeeded by: Aung Maung

Personal details
- Born: Burma
- Party: USDP
- Spouse: Moe Thida
- Children: 1 Daughter (Khin Ingyin)

Phone Zaw Han is a former mayor of Myanmar's second largest city, Mandalay. He was concurrently appointed as the mayor of Mandalay and chairman of the Mandalay City Development Committee. He also became the minister for Development of the Mandalay Region in Thein Sein's Government.

Han is known for his legacy of development and for building roads and infrastructure in the Mandalay region.
