= Ainggye =

- Location in Burma
- Coordinates: 20°8′0″N 96°1′0″E
- Country: Burma
- Division: Mandalay Region
- Township: Tatkon Township

Population (2005)
  - Religions: Buddhism
- Time zone: UTC+6.30 (MST)

Aingdo is a village in the Mandalay Region of north-west Myanmar. It lies in Tatkon Township in the Yamethin District.
