= Thandaunggyi =

Thandaung Gyi သံတောင်ကြီးမြို့ သါတီကၠံၤတ၀ီ
- Town
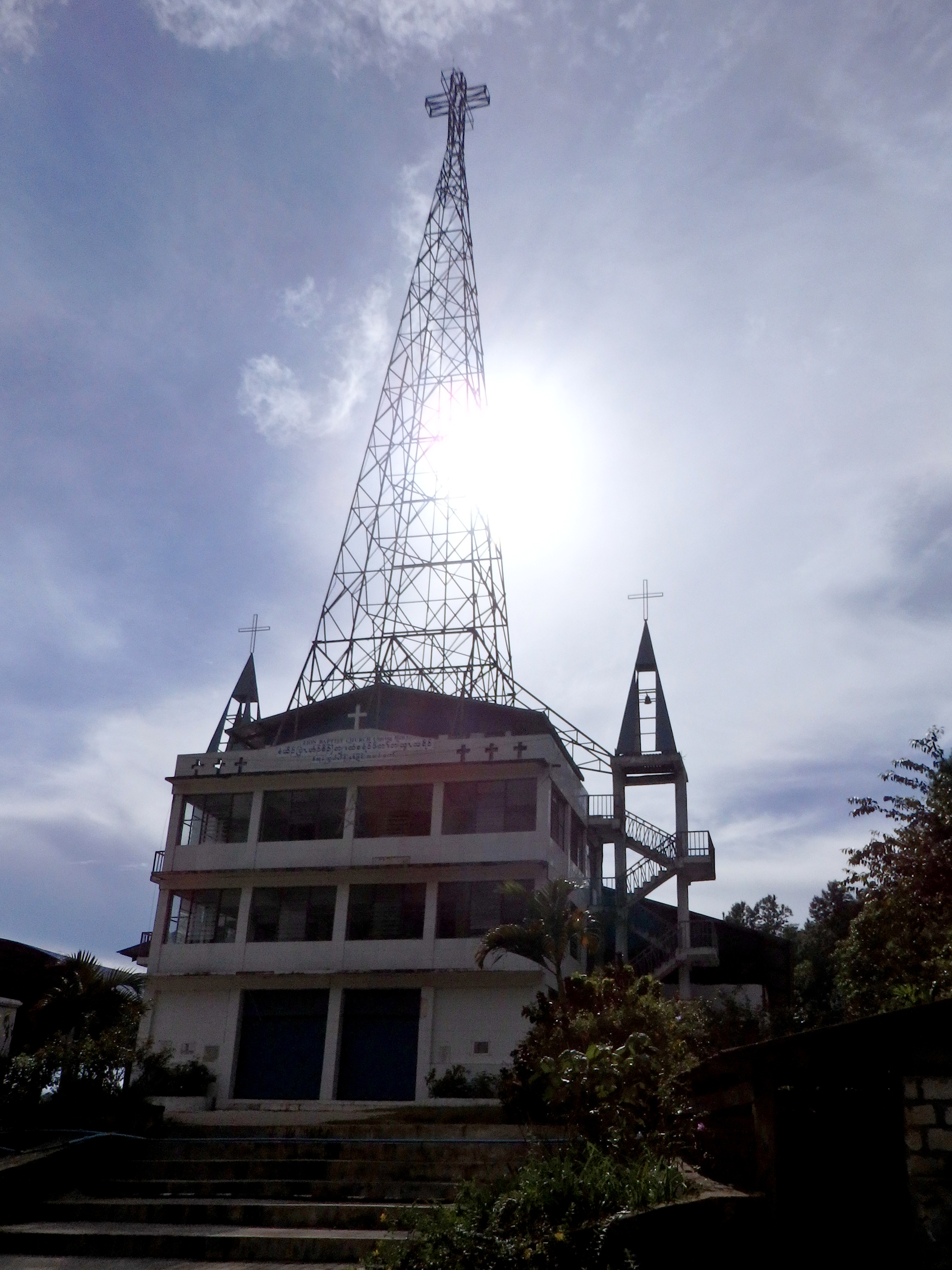

- Location in Myanmar (Burma)
- Coordinates: 19°04′24.2″N 96°40′31.69″E
- Country: Myanmar
- State: Kayin State
- District: Thandaunggyi District
- Township: Thandaunggyi Township

Population (2014)
  - Total: 16,056
  - Religions: Christian
- Time zone: UTC+6.30 (MMT)

Thandaung Gyi (Phlone ဍုံသင်တင်ဍောဟ်; Burmese: သံတောင်ကြီးမြို့; S'gaw Karen: သါတီကၠံၤတ၀ီ) is a town in Kayin State, Myanmar. It is the capital of Thandaunggyi Township and Thandaunggyi District.
