= Zeyathiri Township =

Zeyathiri Township ဇေယျာသီရိမြို့နယ်
- Township
- Zeyathiri Township (red) in Zeyathiri District
- Coordinates: 19.8814°N 96.2645°E
- Country: Myanmar
- Territory: Naypyidaw Union Territory
- District: Zeyathiri District
- Time zone: UTC+6:30 (MMT)

Zeyathiri Township (Burmese: ဇေယျာသီရိမြို့နယ်) is one of Naypyidaw Union Territory's eight townships, located south of Mandalay Region in Myanmar.

== History ==
Zeyathiri Township formerly part of Mandalay Division. The township was designated as one of the original townships constituting the new capital region of Naypyidaw on 26 March 2006 by the Ministry of Home Affairs (MOHA).

Zeyathiri is derived from Pali jayasiri, and literally means "glory of the victory."

== Demographics ==
=== 2014 ===
Historical population
| Year | Pop. | ±% |
|---|---|---|
| 2014 | 111,293 | — |

The 2014 Myanmar Census reported that Zeyathiri Township had a population of 111,293. The population density was 186.2 people per km^{2}. The census reported that the median age was 26.6 years, and 100 males per 100 females. There were 26,075 households; the mean household size was 4.0.

=== Ethnic makeup ===
Ethnic composition of Zeyathiri Township
| Ethnic group | Percentage |
| Bamar | 99.5% |
| Kayin | 0.4% |
| Others | 0.1% |
Source: 2019 GAD township reports

The Bamar make up 99.5% of the township's population.
