= Ye Lwin =

Mayor of Mandalay

His Excellency Dr Ye Lwin
- ရဲလွင်
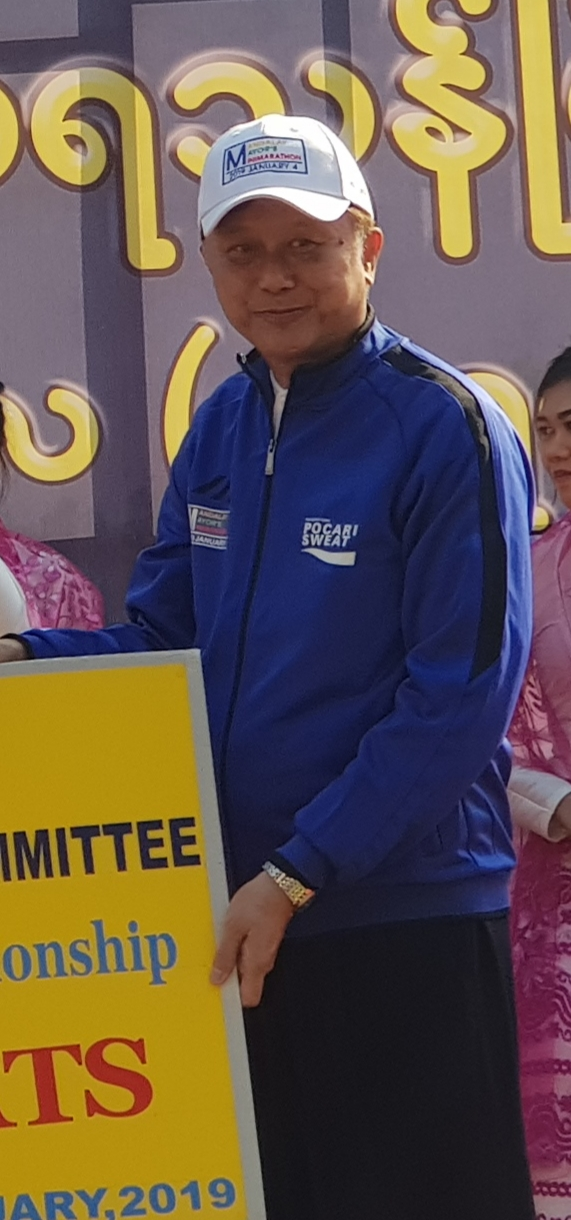

Mayor of Mandalay
- In office 5 April 2016 – 5 February 2021
- Preceded by: Aung Maung
- Succeeded by: Kyaw San

Minister of Municipal of the Mandalay Region
- In office 5 April 2016 – 1 February 2021
- Preceded by: Aung Maung

Chairman of Mandalay City Development Committee
- In office 5 April 2016 – 5 February 2021
- Succeeded by: Kyaw San

Personal details
- Born: May 15, 1951 (age 75) Mandalay, Myanmar
- Spouse: Hla Myo Khin
- Education: University of Medicine, Mandalay
- Occupation: physician, politician
- Known for: Eye Surgeon

Ye Lwin (Burmese: ရဲလွင်; born 15 May 1951) is a Burmese eye surgeon and politician who served as the mayor of Myanmar's second largest city, Mandalay. He was concurrently appointed as the minister of Mandalay Region Municipal and the chairman of the Mandalay City Development Committee on 5 April 2016. Ye Lwin was previously an honorary professor at University of Medicine, Mandalay.

== Early life and education ==
Ye Lwin was born on September 2, 1953, in Mandalay, Myanmar. He graduated with flying colors from No. 9 Basic Education High School in Mandalay. He submitted an admission application to the University of Medicine, Mandalay, and successfully obtained his doctorate in 1979. Additionally, he completed a Master's degree in Ophthalmology at University of Medicine 1, Yangon from 1986 to 1989.

== Career ==
He served as the Head of the Department of Ophthalmology at University of Medicine, Mandalay. Ye Lwin, along with his wife, established a private eye clinic on the western outskirts of Mandalay. Following the 2015 general election, Ye Lwin's friend, Dr. Zaw Myint Maung, assumed the role of chief minister of Mandalay and extended an offer for Ye Lwin to serve as the mayor. Despite declining three times initially, he eventually accepted the offer. On April 5, 2016, President Htin Kyaw appointed him as the minister of Mandalay Region Municipal Development, chairman of the Mandalay City Municipal Development Committee, and mayor of Mandalay. Initially facing opposition from the city's residents upon assuming the role of mayor, he later demonstrated his dedication through hard work.

In May 2016, he courted public controversy surrounding the upgrade of a road in Mandalay where he has a private clinic.

During his tenure as mayor, he significantly improved the city of Mandalay, leading to its ranking as the 5th city among the top 10 likely to become smart cities in the ASEAN region.

In the aftermath of the 2021 Myanmar coup d'état, he was arrested along with state leaders and ministers and released on February 1. Subsequently, on February 5, he resigned as mayor. However, he was detained again on February 9, with authorities claiming that he had incited municipal employees to participate in civil disobedience movements through his social media. Charged under Section 505(b), Ye Lwin was sentenced to two years in prison on December 8, 2021. Despite his lawyers appealing the cases, the appeal was ultimately dismissed. Following that, on February 3, 2023, he received another two-year prison sentence on the charge of Section 409 for the misappropriation of state property.

On January 4, 2024, he was released from prison through a pardon to commemorate Independence Day.

== See also ==
- Mandalay Region Government
