= Myo Aung =

Burmese politician and physician

Member of the Amyotha Hluttaw
- In office 1 February 2016 – 1 February 2021
- Constituency: Kayin State No. 9

Personal details
- Born: 17 February 1951 (age 75) Kawkareik, Kayin State, Myanmar
- Party: National League for Democracy
- Spouse: Win Aye
- Children: 2
- Parent(s): Thar Cho (father); Kyin Thaung (mother)
- Education: University of Medicine 2, Yangon (M.B.B.S)
- Occupation: Politician, physician

Myo Aung (Burmese: မျိုးအောင်, born 17 February 1951) is a Burmese politician and physician who formerly served as an Amyotha Hluttaw MP for Kayin State No. 9 constituency and Chairman of the Naypyidaw Council and Naypyidaw Development Committee. He is a member of the National League for Democracy.

== Early life and education ==
Myo was born on 17 February 1951 in Kawkareik Township, Kayin State, Myanmar. He graduated with M.B.B.S from University of Medicine 2, Yangon. He is also a medical doctor and opened a private clinic in Kawkareik.

== Political career ==
In the 2015 Myanmar general election, he was elected as an Amyotha Hluttaw MP from Kayin State No. 9 parliamentary constituency. where he served as a member of the Amyotha Hluttaw's Bill Committee.

=== Arrest and imprisonment ===
On February 1, 2021, Dr. Aung was placed under arrest and detained during the 2021 Myanmar coup d'état, and charged with violating the Anti-Corruption Law in a land use permit transaction. He was later charged in April with sedition under Article 505(b) of the Penal Code for a statement published by the Central Executive Committee of the National League for Democracy (NDL) appealing to the public for support against the coup. Dr. Aung was convicted of sedition on December 6, 2021 by a military junta court, and sentenced to 2 years incarceration. Amnesty International called the sentences and decisions "bogus", "farcical" and "corrupt".
