= Districts of Myanmar =

Second-level administrative divisions of Myanmar

Districts of Myanmar as of 2022

Districts (Burmese: ခရိုင်, Kharuing; IPA: [kʰəjàiɰ̃]) are the second-level administrative divisions of Myanmar. They are the subdivisions of the regions and states of Myanmar. Districts are in turn subdivided into townships, then towns, wards and villages. Prior to 2022, there were 76 districts in Myanmar. The number of districts was expanded to a total of 121 on 30 April 2022 through Notification 319/2022 through 333/2022 under the authority of the Ministry of Home Affairs with the most new districts going to Shan State and Yangon Region.

The district's role is more supervisory as the townships are the basic administrative unit of local governance. A district is led by a district administrator, a civil servant appointed through the General Administration Department (GAD) of the Ministry of Home Affairs (MOHA). The minister of home affairs is to be appointed by the military according to the 2008 constitution.

== List of districts by region or state ==
Below is a list of districts of Myanmar by region and state as of April 30, 2022

Region or State	№ of Districts	Name		Burmese Name	Capital	Map	Notes
Ayeyarwady Region	8	Hinthada District		ဟင်္သာတခရိုင်	Hinthada		
Ayeyarwady Region	8	Kyonpyaw District		ကျုံပျော်ခရိုင်	Kyonpyaw		Split in 2019 from Pathein District
Ayeyarwady Region	8	Labutta District		လပွတ္တာခရိုင်	Labutta		Created in 2008
Ayeyarwady Region	8	Ma-ubin District		မအူပင်ခရိုင်	Ma-ubin		
Ayeyarwady Region	8	Myanaung District		မြန်အောင်ခရိုင်	Myanaung		Split in 2019 from Hinthada District
Ayeyarwady Region	8	Myaungmya District		မြောင်းမြခရိုင်	Myaungmya		
Ayeyarwady Region	8	Pathein District		ပုသိမ်ခရိုင်	Pathein		
Ayeyarwady Region	8	Pyapon District		ဖျာပုံခရိုင်	Pyapon		
Bago Region	6	Bago District		ပဲခူးခရိုင်	Bago		
Bago Region	6	Nyaunglebin District		ညောင်လေးပင်ခရိုင်	Nyaunglebin		Split in 2022 from Bago District
Bago Region	6	Nattalin District		နတ်တလင်းခရိုင်	Nattalin		Split in 2022 from Pyay District and Tharrawaddy District
Bago Region	6	Pyay District		ပြည်ခရိုင်	Pyay		
Bago Region	6	Taungoo District		တောင်ငူခရိုင်	Taungoo		
Bago Region	6	Tharrawaddy District		သာယာဝတီခရိုင်	Tharrawaddy		
Chin State	6	Falam District		ဖလမ်းခရိုင်	Falam		
Chin State	6	Hakha District		ဟားခါးခရိုင်	Hakha		
Chin State	6	Matupi District		မတူပီခရိုင်	Matupi		
Chin State	6	Mindat District		မင်းတပ်ခရိုင်	Mindat		
Chin State	6	Paletwa District		ပလက်ဝခရိုင်	Paletwa		Split in 2022 from Matupi District
Chin State	6	Tedim District		တီးတိန်ခရိုင်	Tedim		Split in 2022 from Falam District
Kachin State	6	Bhamo District		ဗန်းမော်ခရိုင်	Bhamo		
Kachin State	6	Chipwi District		ချီဖွေခရိုင်	Chipwi		Split in 2022 from Myitkyina District
Kachin State	6	Mohnyin District		မိုးညှင်းခရိုင်	Mohnyin		
Kachin State	6	Myitkyina District		မြစ်ကြီးနားခရိုင်	Myitkyina		
Kachin State	6	Putao District		ပူတာအိုခရိုင်	Putao		
Kachin State	6	Tanai District		တနိုင်းခရိုင်	Tanai		Split in 2022 from Myitkyina District
Kayah State	4	Bawlakhe District		ဘော်လခဲခရိုင်	Bawlakhe		
Kayah State	4	Demoso District		ဒီးမော့ဆိုခရိုင်	Demoso		Split in 2022 from Loikaw District
Kayah State	4	Loikaw District		လွိုင်ကော်‌ခရိုင်	Loikaw		
Kayah State	4	Mese District		မယ်စဲ့ခရိုင်	Mese		Split in 2022 from Bawlakhe District
Kayin State	6	Hpa-an District		ဘားအံခရိုင်	Hpa-an		
Kayin State	6	Hpapun District		ဖာပွန်ခရိုင်	Papun		Split in 2011 from Hpa-an District
Kayin State	6	Kawkareik District		ကော့ကရိတ်ခရိုင်	Kawkareik		
Kayin State	6	Kyain Seikgyi District		ကြာအင်းဆိပ်ကြီးခရိုင်	Kyainseikgyi		Split in 2022 from Kawkareik District
Kayin State	6	Myawaddy District		မြဝတီခရိုင်	Myawaddy		
Kayin State	6	Thandaunggyi District		သံတောင်ကြီးခရိုင်	Thandaunggyi		Split in 2022 from Hpa-an District
Magway Region	7	Aunglan District		အောင်လံခရိုင်	Aunglan		Split in 2022 from Thayet District
Magway Region	7	Chauk District		ချောက်ခရိုင်	Chauk		Split in 2022 from Magway District
Magway Region	7	Gangaw District		ဂန့်ဂေါ ခရိုင်	Gangaw		
Magway Region	7	Magway District		မကွေးခရိုင်	Magway		
Magway Region	7	Minbu District		မင်းဘူးခရိုင်	Minbu		
Magway Region	7	Pakokku District		ပခုက္ကူခရိုင်	Pakokku		
Magway Region	7	Thayet District		သရက်ခရိုင်	Thayet		
Mandalay Region	11	Amarapura District		အမရပူရ ခရိုင်	Mandalay		Split in 2022 from the now suppressed Mandalay District
Mandalay Region	11	Aungmyethazan District		အောင်မြေသာစံခရိုင်	Mandalay		Split in 2022 from Mandalay District and Pyin Oo Lwin District
Mandalay Region	11	Maha Aungmye District		မဟာအောင်မြေ ခရိုင်	Mandalay		Created in 2022 from the now suppressed Mandalay District
Mandalay Region	11	Kyaukse District		ကျောက်ဆည်ခရိုင်	Kyaukse		
Mandalay Region	11	Meiktila District		မိတ္ထီလာခရိုင်	Meiktila		
Mandalay Region	11	Myingyan District		မြင်းခြံခရိုင်	Myingyan		
Mandalay Region	11	Nyaung-U District		ညောင်ဦးခရိုင်	Nyaung-U		
Mandalay Region	11	Pyin Oo Lwin District		ပြင်‌ဦးလွင်‌ခရိုင်	Pyin Oo Lwin		
Mandalay Region	11	Tada-U District		တံတားဦး ခရိုင်	Tada-U		Split in 2022 from Kyaukse District and Myingyan District
Mandalay Region	11	Thabeikkyin District		သပိတ်ကျင်း ခရိုင်	Thabeikkyin		Split in 2022 from Pyin Oo Lwin District
Mandalay Region	11	Yamethin District		ရမည်းသင်း	Yamethin		
Mon State	4	Kyaikto District		ကျိုက်ထိုခရိုင်	Kyaikto		Split in 2022 from Thaton District
Mon State	4	Mawlamyine District		မော်လမြိုင်ခရိုင်	Mawlamyine		
Mon State	4	Thaton District		သထုံခရိုင်	Thaton		
Mon State	4	Ye District		ရေးခရိုင်	Ye		Split in 2022 from Mawlamyine District
Naypyidaw Union Territory	4	Ottara District		ဥတ္တရခရိုင်	Ottarathiri	borderless	
Naypyidaw Union Territory	4	Zeyathiri District		ဇေယျာသီရိခရိုင်	Zeyathiri	borderless	Split in 2022 from Ottara District
Naypyidaw Union Territory	4	Dekkhina District		ဒက္ခိဏခရိုင်	Dekkhinathiri	borderless	
Naypyidaw Union Territory	4	Pyinmana District		ပျဉ်းမနားခရိုင်	Pyinmana	borderless	Split in 2022 from Dekkhina District
Rakhine State	7	Ann District		အမ်းခရိုင်	Ann		Split in 2022 from Kyaukphyu District
Rakhine State	7	Kyaukphyu District		ကျောက်ဖြူခရိုင်	Kyaukphyu		
Rakhine State	7	Maungdaw District		မောင်တောခရိုင်	Maungdaw		
Rakhine State	7	Mrauk-U District		မြောက်ဦးခရိုင်	Mrauk U		
Rakhine State	7	Sittwe District		စစ်တွေခရိုင်	Sittwe		
Rakhine State	7	Thandwe District		စစ်တွေခရိုင်	Thandwe		
Rakhine State	7	Taungup District		တောင်ကုတ်ခရိုင်	Taungup		Split in 2022 from Thandwe District and Kyaukpyu District
Sagaing Region	14 (including the Naga Self-Administered Zone); 13 (districts only)	Hkamti District		ခန္တီးခရိုင်	Hkamti		
Sagaing Region	14 (including the Naga Self-Administered Zone); 13 (districts only)	Homalin District		ဟုမ္မလင်းခရိုင်	Homalin		Split in 2022 from Hkamti District
Sagaing Region	14 (including the Naga Self-Administered Zone); 13 (districts only)	Kanbalu District		ကန့်ဘလူခရိုင်	Kanbalu		Split from Shwebo District
Sagaing Region	14 (including the Naga Self-Administered Zone); 13 (districts only)	Kale District		ကလေးခရိုင်	Kalay		
Sagaing Region	14 (including the Naga Self-Administered Zone); 13 (districts only)	Katha District		ကသာခရိုင်	Katha		
Sagaing Region	14 (including the Naga Self-Administered Zone); 13 (districts only)	Kawlin District		ကောလင်းခရိုင်	Kawlin		Split in 2018 from Katha District
Sagaing Region	14 (including the Naga Self-Administered Zone); 13 (districts only)	Mawlaik District		မော်လိုက်ခရိုင်	Mawlaik		
Sagaing Region	14 (including the Naga Self-Administered Zone); 13 (districts only)	Monywa District		မုံရွာခရိုင်	Monywa		
Sagaing Region	14 (including the Naga Self-Administered Zone); 13 (districts only)	Naga Self-Administered Zone		နာဂကိုယ်ပိုင်အုပ်ချုပ်ခွင့်ရဒေသ	Lahe		Split in 2010 from Hkamti District
Sagaing Region	14 (including the Naga Self-Administered Zone); 13 (districts only)	Sagaing District		စစ်ကိုင်းခရိုင်	Sagaing		
Sagaing Region	14 (including the Naga Self-Administered Zone); 13 (districts only)	Shwebo District		ရွှေဘိုခရိုင်	Shwebo		
Sagaing Region	14 (including the Naga Self-Administered Zone); 13 (districts only)	Tamu District		တမူးခရိုင်	Tamu		
Sagaing Region	14 (including the Naga Self-Administered Zone); 13 (districts only)	Ye-U District		ရေဦးခရိုင်	Ye-U		Split in 2022 from Shwebo District
Sagaing Region	14 (including the Naga Self-Administered Zone); 13 (districts only)	Yinmabin District		ယင်းမာပင်ခရိုင်	Yinmabin		
Shan State	23 (including 4 Self-Administered Zones); 19 (districts only) + 2 districts of the Wa Self-Administered Division	Danu Self-Administered Zone		ဓနု ကိုယ်ပိုင်အုပ်ချုပ်ခွင့်ရ ဒေသ	Pindaya		Split in 2008 from Taunggyi District
Shan State	23 (including 4 Self-Administered Zones); 19 (districts only) + 2 districts of the Wa Self-Administered Division	Kalaw District		ကလောခရိုင်	Kalaw		Split in 2022 from Taunggyi District
Shan State	23 (including 4 Self-Administered Zones); 19 (districts only) + 2 districts of the Wa Self-Administered Division	Kengtung District		ကျိုင်းတုံခရိုင်	Kengtung		
Shan State	23 (including 4 Self-Administered Zones); 19 (districts only) + 2 districts of the Wa Self-Administered Division	Kokang Self-Administered Zone		ကိုးကန့် ကိုယ်ပိုင်အုပ်ချုပ်ခွင့်ရ ဒေသ	Laukkai		Created in 2008 from Laukkaing District, it is under MNDAA government
Shan State	23 (including 4 Self-Administered Zones); 19 (districts only) + 2 districts of the Wa Self-Administered Division	Kutkai District		ကွတ်ခိုင်ခရိုင်	Kutkai		Split in 2022 from Muse District
Shan State	23 (including 4 Self-Administered Zones); 19 (districts only) + 2 districts of the Wa Self-Administered Division	Kyaukme District		ကျောက်မဲခရိုင်	Kyaukme		
Shan State	23 (including 4 Self-Administered Zones); 19 (districts only) + 2 districts of the Wa Self-Administered Division	Langhko District		လင်းခေးခရိုင်	Langhko		
Shan State	23 (including 4 Self-Administered Zones); 19 (districts only) + 2 districts of the Wa Self-Administered Division	Lashio District		လားရှိုးခရိုင်	Lashio		
Shan State	23 (including 4 Self-Administered Zones); 19 (districts only) + 2 districts of the Wa Self-Administered Division	Loilen District		လွိုင်လင်ခရိုင်	Loilem		
Shan State	23 (including 4 Self-Administered Zones); 19 (districts only) + 2 districts of the Wa Self-Administered Division	Mong Hsat District		မိုင်းဆတ်ခရိုင်	Mong Hsat		
Shan State	23 (including 4 Self-Administered Zones); 19 (districts only) + 2 districts of the Wa Self-Administered Division	Mong Hsu District		မိုင်းရှူးခရိုင်	Mong Hsu		Split in 2022 from Loilen District
Shan State	23 (including 4 Self-Administered Zones); 19 (districts only) + 2 districts of the Wa Self-Administered Division	Mong La District		မိုင်းလားခရိုင်	Mong La		Split in 2022 from Kengtung District, it is under NDAA government
Shan State	23 (including 4 Self-Administered Zones); 19 (districts only) + 2 districts of the Wa Self-Administered Division	Mongmit District		မိုးမိတ်ခရိုင်	Momeik		Split in 2015 from Kyaukme District
Shan State	23 (including 4 Self-Administered Zones); 19 (districts only) + 2 districts of the Wa Self-Administered Division	Mong Ton District		မိုင်းတုံခရိုင်	Mongton		Split in 2022 from Mong Hsat District
Shan State	23 (including 4 Self-Administered Zones); 19 (districts only) + 2 districts of the Wa Self-Administered Division	Mong Yang District		မိုင်းယန်းခရိုင်	Mong Yang		Split in 2022 from Kengtung District, most of the district is the facto part of Wa State except for Mong Yang town
Shan State	23 (including 4 Self-Administered Zones); 19 (districts only) + 2 districts of the Wa Self-Administered Division	Mong Yawng District		မိုင်းယောင်းခရိုင်	Mong Yawng		Split in 2022 from Tachileik District
Shan State	23 (including 4 Self-Administered Zones); 19 (districts only) + 2 districts of the Wa Self-Administered Division	Mu Se District		မူစယ်ခရိုင်	Muse		
Shan State	23 (including 4 Self-Administered Zones); 19 (districts only) + 2 districts of the Wa Self-Administered Division	Nansang District		နမ့်စန်ခရိုင်	Nansang		Split in 2022 from Loilen District and Langhko District
Shan State	23 (including 4 Self-Administered Zones); 19 (districts only) + 2 districts of the Wa Self-Administered Division	Pa Laung Self-Administered Zone		ပလောင် ကိုယ်ပိုင်အုပ်ချုပ်ခွင့်ရ ဒေသ	Namhsan		Split in 2008 from Kyaukme District, it is under TNLA government
Shan State	23 (including 4 Self-Administered Zones); 19 (districts only) + 2 districts of the Wa Self-Administered Division	Pa'O Self-Administered Zone		ပအိုဝ်းကိုယ်ပိုင်အုပ်ချုပ်ခွင့်ရဒေသ	Hopong		Split in 2008 from Taunggyi District
Shan State	23 (including 4 Self-Administered Zones); 19 (districts only) + 2 districts of the Wa Self-Administered Division	Tachileik District		တာချီလိတ်ခရိုင်	Tachileik		
Shan State	23 (including 4 Self-Administered Zones); 19 (districts only) + 2 districts of the Wa Self-Administered Division	Tangyan District		တန့်ယန်းခရိုင်	Tangyan		Split in 2022 from Lashio District
Shan State	23 (including 4 Self-Administered Zones); 19 (districts only) + 2 districts of the Wa Self-Administered Division	Taunggyi District		တောင်ကြီးခရိုင်	Taunggyi		
Shan State	23 (including 4 Self-Administered Zones); 19 (districts only) + 2 districts of the Wa Self-Administered Division	Wa Self-Administered Division	Hopang District	ဟိုပန်ခရိုင်	Hopang		Split in September 2011 from Kunlong District, since 2024 it is the facto part of Wa State
Shan State	23 (including 4 Self-Administered Zones); 19 (districts only) + 2 districts of the Wa Self-Administered Division	Wa Self-Administered Division	Matman District	မက်မန်းခရိုင်	Matman		Split in 2013 from Hopang District, it is the facto part of Wa State
Tanintharyi Region	4	Dawei District		ထားဝယ်ခရိုင်	Dawei		
Tanintharyi Region	4	Myeik District		မြိတ်ခရိုင်	Myeik		
Tanintharyi Region	4	Bokepyin District		ဘုတ်ပြင်းခရိုင်	Bokepyin		Split in 2022 from Kawthaung District
Tanintharyi Region	4	Kawthaung District		ကော့သောင်းခရိုင်	Kawthaung		
Yangon Region	14	Taikkyi District		တိုက်ကြီးခရိုင်	Taikkyi		Split in 2022 from North Yangon District
Yangon Region	14	Hlegu District		လှည်းကူးခရိုင်	Hlegu		Split in 2022 from North Yangon District
Yangon Region	14	Hmawbi District		လှည်းကူးခရိုင်	Hmawbi		Split in 2022 from North Yangon District
Yangon Region	14	Mingaladon District		မင်္ဂလာဒုံခရိုင်	Yangon		Split in 2022 from North Yangon District
Yangon Region	14	Insein District		အင်းစိန်ခရိုင်	Yangon		Split in 2022 from North Yangon District
Yangon Region	14	Kyauktada District		ကျောက်တံတားခရိုင်	Yangon		Split in 2022 from West Yangon District
Yangon Region	14	Ahlon District		အလုံခရိုင်	Yangon		Split in 2022 from West Yangon District
Yangon Region	14	Kamayut District		ကမာရွတ်ခရိုင်	Yangon		Split in 2022 from West Yangon District
Yangon Region	14	Mayangon District		မရမ်းကုန်းခရိုင်	Yangon		Split in 2022
Yangon Region	14	Thingangyun District		သင်္ဃန်းကျွန်းခရိုင်	Yangon		Split in 2022 from East Yangon District
Yangon Region	14	Botataung District		ဗိုလ်တထောင်ခရိုင်	Yangon		Split in 2022 from East Yangon District
Yangon Region	14	Dagon Myothit District		ဒဂုံမြို့သစ်ခရိုင်	Yangon		Split in 2022 from East Yangon District
Yangon Region	14	Twante District		တွံတေးခရိုင်	Twante		Split in 2022 from South Yangon District
Yangon Region	14	Thanlyin District		သန်လျင်ခရိုင်	Thanlyin		Split in 2022 from South Yangon District

== See also ==
- Administrative divisions of Myanmar
- List of cities and largest towns in Myanmar
