= Mayor of Mandalay =

- မန္တလေးမြို့တော်ဝန်
- Incumbent; Khin Maung Aye since 10 April 2026
- Mandalay City Development Committee
- Member of: Mandalay Region Government
- Reports to: Chief Minister
- Residence: Mayor's House
- Nominator: Mandalay Region Hluttaw
- Appointer: President
- Term length: 5 years
- Formation: 1992
- First holder: Tun Kyi

The Mayor of Mandalay is the head of Mandalay City Development Committee which serves the Myanmar's second largest city, Mandalay.The current mayor is Kyaw San appointed by SAC chairman Min Aung Hlaing.

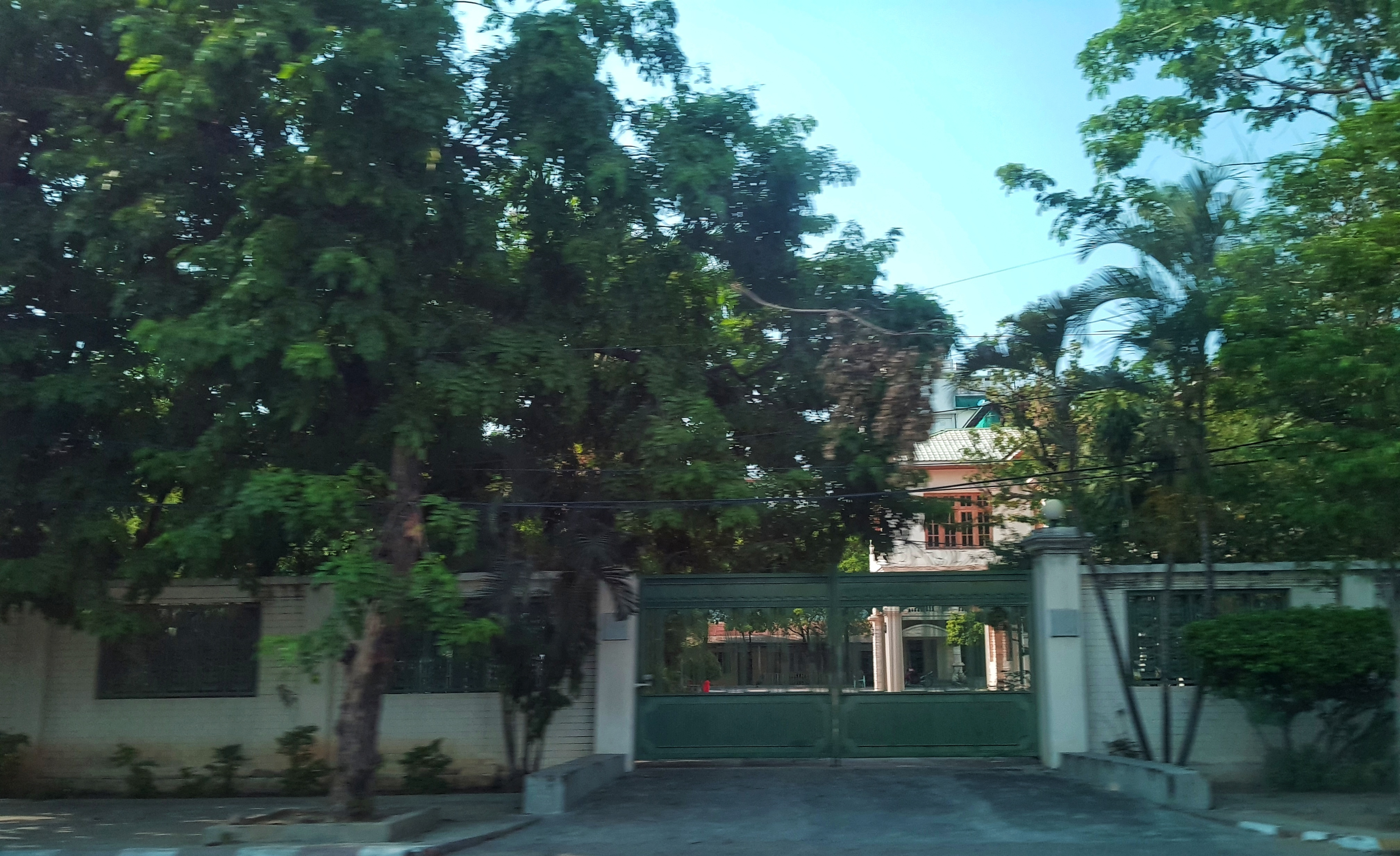
Mayor's Residence

== List of mayors ==
=== 1992 - 2011 ===
- Lieutenant Colonel Tun Kyi (27 October 1992 - 16 June 1995)
- Colonel Sein Win Aung (17 June 1995 - 30 June 1998)
- Major General Ye Myint (1 July 1998 - 31 July 1998)
- Brigadier general Yan Thein (4 August 1998 - 8 February 2005)
- Major General Ye Myint (9 February 2005 - 15 February 2005)
- Brigadier general Phone Zaw Han (16 February 2005 - 31 March 2011)

=== (2011–present) ===
No.	Portrait	Name	Term of office			Political party	Chief Minister	President
No.	Portrait	Name	Took office	Left office	Days	Political party	Chief Minister	President
1		Phone Zaw Han	6 April 2011	27 February 2012	327	Union Solidarity and Development Party	Ye Myint	Thein Sein
1		Phone Zaw Han	He was a mayor of Mandalay since 1 February 2005.					
2		Aung Maung	27 February 2012	30 March 2016	1493	Union Solidarity and Development Party	Ye Myint	Thein Sein
2		Aung Maung	He was a professor of Mandalay University and became a mayor.					
3		Ye Lwin	5 April 2016	5 February 2021	1767	Independent	Zaw Myint Maung	Htin Kyaw; Myint Swe (acting); Win Myint
3		Ye Lwin	He is a famous doctor of Mandalay and became a mayor.					
4		Kyaw San	7 February 2021	10 April 2026	1713	-	Maung Ko; Myo Aung	Myint Swe (acting); Min Aung Hlaing (acting)
4		Kyaw San	former regional minister for transport in Ye Myint's Cabinet of Mandalay Region					
5		Khin Maung Aye	10 April 2026	Incumbent	150 days		Myo Aung	Min Aung Hlaing
