= Thandaunggyi District =

Thandaunggyi Township Thandaunggyi District သါတီကၠံၤကီၢ်ဆၣ် သံတောင်ကြီးခရိုင်
- Township and District
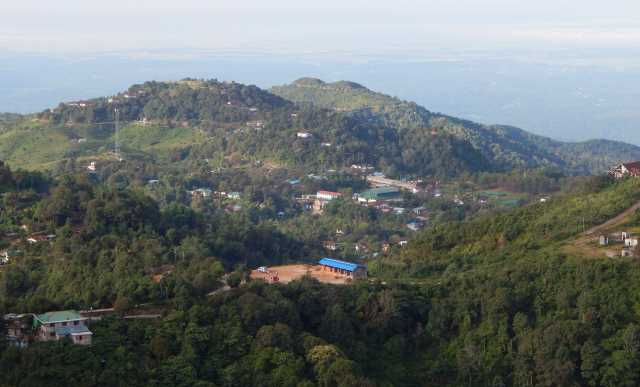

- Location in Kayin State
- Coordinates: 19°04′24.2″N 96°40′31.69″E
- Country: Myanmar
- State: Kayin State
- District: Thandaunggyi District
- Capital: Thandaunggyi

Area
  - Total: 1,412.89 sq mi (3,659.4 km^{2})

Population (2023)
  - Total: 93,642
  - Density: 66.277/sq mi (25.590/km^{2})
- Time zone: UTC+6:30 (MMT)

Thandaunggyi Township (Phlone: သင်တင်ဍောဟ်ကၞင့်; Burmese: သံတောင်ကြီးမြို့နယ်; S'gaw Karen: သါတီကၠံၤကီၢ်ဆၣ်) is the only township of Thandaunggyi District (Burmese: သံတောင်ကြီးခရိုင်) in northern Kayin State of Myanmar. The principal town is Thandaunggyi. The township has four towns and 341 villages grouped into 59 village tracts.

In 2014, the township had 30,209 people. By 2023, the population had grown significantly to 93,642 people.

== Towns ==
The township contains the following towns for a total urban population of 20,192 people.

- Thandaung Gyi
- Thandaung
- Leiktho
- Bawgali
