= Pyinmana Township =

Pyinmana Township ပျဉ်းမနားမြို့နယ်
- Township
- Pyinmana Township in Pyinmana District
- Coordinates: 19°45′N 96°12′E
- Country: Myanmar
- Territory: Naypyidaw Union Territory
- District: Pyinmana District
- Capital: Pyinmana
- Time zone: UTC+6:30 (MMT)

Pyinmana Township (Burmese: ပျဉ်းမနားမြို့နယ်) is one of eight townships of Naypyidaw Union Territory, Myanmar.

== History ==
Historically, Pyinmana was formerly known as Ningyan (နင်းကြမ်း). Shan traders who observed the abundance of Terminalia chebula trees around the area named the city Pangmaakna (ပၢင်မၢၵ်ႇၼႃႉ), lit. "myrobalan encampment," from which the Burmese language name Pyinmana is derived.

Pyinmana Township was formerly part of Mandalay Division. The township was designated as one of the original townships constituting the new capital region of Naypyidaw on 26 November 2008 by the Ministry of Home Affairs (MOHA).

== Demographics ==
=== 2014 ===
Historical population
Year	Pop.	±%
2014	187,565	—

At the 2014 Myanmar Census Pyinmana Township had a population of 187,565. The population density was 170.1 people per km^{2}. The census reported that the median age was 26.6 years, and 94 males per 100 females. There were 39,663 households; the mean household size was 4.5.

=== Ethnic makeup ===
Ethnic composition of Pyinmana Township
Ethnic group	Percentage
Bamar	84.06%
Others	8.28%
Kayin	5.62%
Kayah	1.50%
Shan	0.36%
Chin	0.12%
Rakhine	0.02%
Mon	0.02%
Kachin	0.01%
Source: 2019 GAD township report

The Bamar make up the majority of the township's population, while the Karen form the largest minority group.

== Villages ==
- Alae Chaung
- Alyinlo
- Bantbar
- Boma
- Chaing
- Chin
- Gadozeik
- Hnandaw
- Kainggalay
- Kan U
- Kinmundan
- Koe Tit Ywa Ma
- Kyaukchet
- Kyaukthanpat
- Kye-inn
- Kyi Taung
- Kyi Taung Kan
- Kyunyaung
- Leluaing
- Ma-u-daw
- Maungyan
- Mepauk
- Milaunggon
- Mingon
- Moeswe
- Natthayae
- Ngakaungkan
- Ngokechaung
- Nyaungbingyi
- Nyaungbintha
- Pyadaungkoe
- Pyangabye
- Pyinmana Haung
- Pyu Dwin
- Seiknandon
- Sibin
- Sinthawt
- Sinthe
- Taungnyo
- Taungtha
- Thagyarset
- Thanatpinzeik
- Tharyargon
- Thayetkon
- Tegyigon
- Thittat
- Thitlelon
- Thitton
- Thityargon
- Yezin
- Yaukthwar-inn
- Ywadaw
- Ywathit
- Zalaung
- Zegon
- Ziphyupin

== Dams ==
Pyinmana Township has the following dams.

- Ngalaik Dam
- Chaungmagyi Dam
- Yezin Dam

== Creeks ==
Pyinmana has

- Sinthe Creek
- Ngalaik Creek
- Patwe Creek
- PaungLaung Creek
- Lwegyi Creek
- Kyatpyin Creek
- Letswe Creek
- Chaungmagyi Creek
- Kogwe Creek
