= Nay Pyi Taw Union Territory =

Union territory of Myanmar

Union Territory (Nay Pyi Taw) Nay Pyi Taw Council Territory ပြည်‌ထောင်စုနယ်မြေ (နေပြည်တော်) နေပြည်တော်ကောင်စီနယ်မြေ
- Union Territory
- Flag Seal

- Location in Myanmar (Burma)
- Coordinates: 19°45′0″N 96°6′0″E
- Country: Myanmar
- Capital: Naypyidaw

Government
  - Body: Naypyidaw Council
  - Chairperson of the Naypyidaw Council: Tin Oo Lwin
  - Chairperson of the Naypyidaw Development Committee: Maung Maung Naing

Area
  - Union Territory: 7,054 km^{2} (2,724 sq mi)

Population (2014)
  - Union Territory: 1,160,242
  - Rank: 13th
  - Density: 164.5/km^{2} (426.0/sq mi)
  - Metro: 683,000
- Demonym: Naypyidawan
- Time zone: UTC+6:30 (MMT)
- Postal codes: 15011 to 15033
- Area codes: 2 (mobile: 69, 90)
- Website: www.nptcouncil.gov.mm

The Union Territory (Nay Pyi Taw) (Burmese: ပြည်‌ထောင်စုနယ်မြေ (နေပြည်တော်)), also called Nay Pyi Taw Council Territory (Burmese: နေပြည်တော်ကောင်စီနယ်မြေ) is a first-level administrative division in central Myanmar (Burma). It contains Naypyidaw, the capital city of Myanmar. The union territory was officially separated from the Mandalay Region in 2008. Naypyidaw is also spelled as Nay Pyi Taw, Nay Pyitaw, or Nay Pyi Daw.

== Administrative divisions ==
Prior to 2022, the Naypyidaw Union Territory consisted of two districts – Ottara and Dekkhina also known as North and South Naypyidaw respectively. In 2022, the townships were reorganised into four districts.

The Naypyidaw Union Territory consists of the following districts and townships:

- Ottara District
  - Ottarathiri Township (ဥတ္တရသီရိမြို့နယ်)
  - Tatkone Township (တပ်ကုန်းမြို့နယ်)
- Zeyathiri District
  - Zeyathiri Township (ဇေယျာသီရိမြို့နယ်)
  - Pobbathiri Township (ပုဗ္ဗသီရိမြို့နယ်)
- Dekkhina District (also known as Lewe District)
  - Dekkhinathiri Township (ဒက္ခိဏသီရိမြို့နယ်)
  - Lewe Township (လယ်ဝေးမြို့နယ်)
- Pyinmana District
  - Pyinmana Township (ပျဉ်းမနားမြို့နယ်)
  - Zabuthiri Township (ဇမ္ဗူသီရိမြို့နယ်)

== Administration ==
Naypyidaw Union Territory is under the direct administration of the President. Day-to-day functions are carried out on the President's behalf by the Naypyidaw Council led by a Chairperson. The Chairperson and members of the Naypyidaw Council are appointed by the President and include both civilians and Armed Forces representatives.

On 30 March 2011, President Thein Sein appointed Thein Nyunt as chairman of the Naypyidaw Council, along with 9 chair members: Than Htay, Colonel Myint Aung Than, Kan Chun, Paing Soe, Saw Hla, Myint Swe, Myint Shwe and Myo Nyunt.

=== Chairmen of the Naypyidaw Council ===
- Thein Nyunt (30 Mar 2011 – 30 Mar 2016)
- Myo Aung (30 Mar 2016 – 1 Feb 2021)
- Maung Maung Naing (2 Feb 2021 – 19 Aug 2022)
- Tin Oo Lwin (19 Aug 2022 – present)

== Demographics ==
Historical population
Year	Pop.	±%
2014	1,160,242	—
Source: 2014 Myanmar Census

Religion in Naypyidaw Union Territory (2014)
Religion	Percent
Buddhism	96.8%
Islam	2.1%
Christianity	1.1%

The 2014 Myanmar Census reported that Naypyidaw Union Territory had a population of 1,160,242. The population density was 164.4 people per km^{2}. The census reported that the median age was 26.8 years, and 95 males per 100 females. There were 262,253 households; the mean household size was 4.1.

=== Religion ===
According to the 2014 Myanmar Census, Buddhists make up 96.8% of Naypyidaw Union Territory's population, forming the largest religious community there. Minority religious communities include Christians (1.1%), Muslims (2.1%), and Hindus (0%) who collectively comprise the remainder of Naypyidaw Union Territory's population.

According to the State Sangha Maha Nayaka Committee’s 2016 statistics, 10,956 Buddhist monks were registered in Naypyidaw Union Territory, comprising 2% of Myanmar's total Sangha membership, which includes both novice samanera and fully-ordained bhikkhu. The majority of monks belong to the Thudhamma Nikaya (98.2%), followed by Shwegyin Nikaya (1.8%), with the remainder of monks belonging to other small monastic orders. 923 thilashin were registered in Naypyidaw Union Territory, comprising 1.5% of Myanmar's total thilashin community.
