= Zeyathiri District =

District of the Naypyidaw Union Territory in Myanmar

Zeyathiri District ဇေယျာသီရိခရိုင်
- Zeyathiri District (Red) in the Naypyidaw Union Territory
- Coordinates: 19.970°N 96.272°E
- Country: Myanmar
- Territory: Naypyidaw Union Territory
- Time zone: MMT

Zeyathiri District (Burmese: ဇေယျာသီရိခရိုင်) is a district of the Naypyidaw Union Territory in Myanmar. The District has two townships Zeyathiri Township and Pobbathiri Township. The district was formed in 2022 by the Ministry of Home Affairs splitting from the Dekkhina District.
