= Tatkon Township =

Tatkon Township တပ်ကုန်းမြို့နယ် Tatkone Township
- Township
- Tatkon Township (red) in Ottara District
- Coordinates: 20°7′N 96°13′E
- Country: Myanmar
- Territory: Naypyidaw Union Territory
- District: Ottara District
- Capital: Tatkon
- Township established: 5-7-1960

Area
  - Township: 695.9 sq mi (1,802.3 km^{2})

Dimensions
  - Length: 46.375 mi (74.633 km)
  - Width: 18.625 mi (29.974 km)
- Highest elevation (Byingye Taung): 6,253 ft (1,906 m)
- Lowest elevation: 449 ft (137 m)

Population (2014)
  - Township: 217,093
  - Density: 312/sq mi (120.5/km^{2})
  - Urban: 41,683
  - Rural: 175,410
- Time zone: UTC+6:30 (MMT)
- Postal Code: 1503
- Area code: 067-
- Vehicle registration: NPW-6

Tatkon Township (/'tæt koʊn/) (Burmese: တပ်ကုန်းမြို့နယ်) is one of eight townships of Naypyidaw Union Territory, Myanmar. Its principal town is Tatkon and according to the 2014 census, Tatkon Township had a population of 217,093.

Tatkon Township was officially recognized as a township by the Township Administration Division, Department of Home Affairs, Notification No. (573) dated (5-7-1960).

== History ==
The area around Tatkon Township is believed to have been inhabited since the Pyu period. In particular, an ancient Pyu town and burial grounds have been found near Nyaunggaing village.

During the Bagan period, Shwemyo village was included in the 43 Border Towns of King Anawrahta.

Initially under the rule of the Yamethin territory, it came under Taungoo territory up to Nyaunglunt village when King Mingyi Nyo succeeded Taungoo in 1485 (847 BE). Shwemyo and Kintha villages were included in 52 Towns of Taungoo during that period.

After the Second Anglo-Burmese War in 1852, the British took over the lower Burma, including Taungoo, and the current Tatkon Township area remained under the rule of the Burmese King and returned to the Yamethin territory.

The present-day areas of Tatkon Township were under the Eastern Division during the colonial period. It includes Paunglaung Township and Taungnyo Township under Pyinmana District, and Yamethin Township under Yamethin District. Generally, the northern part of Sinthe River falls within Yamethin District, while the southern part of Sinthe River falls within Pyinmana District. In 1900, a police station was established in Nyaunggaing village, and it governed the sub-district area covering Nyaunglunt-Temyint-Sedo-Kyaunggon-Kintha-Magyigon-Dwakkyaw-Myaukhmyaik. This may be the beginning of what would later become Tatkon Township area. During the Japanese era, the police station was moved from Nyaunggaing to Tatkon.

After independence, the township was officially inaugurated in 1957, and in 1960, it was officially declared a township by the Home Affairs Department. At that time, Tatkon Township was composed of Shwemyo Sub-Township and Ainggye Sub-Township.

Then, in successive periods, it was a township in Yamethin District, Mandalay Division but was incorporated into Pyinmana District when Pyinmana District was formed to establish Naypyidaw in 2006. When the new 5 Thiri townships of Naypyidaw were formed, the southern village tracts of Tatkon Township, including Nanaw, Khitaye, Kyaukpya, Wegyi, Pyokkwe, Pazunzeik, Nyaunglu, Tatshein, were transferred to these townships. Then, under the 2008 Constitution, it became a township under Ottara District, Naypyidaw Union Territory, in 2010.

== Geography ==
Tatkon Township is located between the Shan Yoma Mountains to the east and the Bago Yoma Mountains to the west, with only about 20% of the township being flat, with the rest being forest and ravines. The elevation ranges from 450 feet to 6,252 feet above sea level. Byingye Taung (Mt Byingye), at 6,252 feet, is the highest peak in Tatkon Township and forms the boundary between Tatkon Township and Pinlaung Township.

The Sinthe and Nawin streams, which are the main watersheds of Tatkon Township, flow from north to south. Nawin stream flows through the middle of the township from north to south, and its basin is the main plain of the township. It flows into Sinthe near Zeegon (Asone) village, where it continues south as Sinthe. Other notable creeks include Nyaunggaing creek, Mon creek, Kintha creek and Myohla creek.

== Boundary and Area ==
Tatkon Township is bordered by Yamethin Township of Mandalay Region to the north, Pinlaung Township of Shan State to the east, Myothit Township of Magway Region to the west, and Ottarathiri, Pobbathiri, and Zeyarthiri townships of the Naypyitaw Union Territory to the south.

The total area of the township is 695.88 square miles. At its widest points, it spans approximately 46 miles and 3 furlongs from east to west, and 18 miles and 5 furlongs from north to south.

== Climate ==
Tatkon Township is situated between a hot, dry region and a warm, humid region. January is typically the coldest month, while May is usually the hottest. Regarding rainfall, precipitation is at its lowest in February and reaches its peak in October.

== Forests ==
Tatkon Township contains a total of 177,143 acres of reserved and protected public forest areas, which accounts for approximately 40% of the township's total land area. The forest distribution is divided as follows:

- Eastern Forests: Located on the Shan Yoma mountain ranges, featuring the Byingye, Natma, Nyaunggaing, and Yezin forest reserves.
- Western Forests: Located on the Bago Yoma ridges, featuring the Upper Sinthe, Lower Sinthe, Hlwabon, Taungnyo, and Ngalaik forest reserves.

== Administration ==
The administrative center of Tatkon Township is the town of Tatkon, which is organized into 6 wards. The township also comprises 49 village tracts, totaling 176 villages.

According to the 2014 census, the urban population stands at 41,683 (19.2%), while the remaining 80.8% of the population resides in rural areas. Although Tatkon is the only official town within the township, the villages of Nyaunglunt and Shwemyo are significant, bustling hubs with a long and prominent history.

== Demographics ==
=== 2014 ===
Historical population
Year	Pop.	±%
2014	217,093	—

The 2014 Myanmar Census reported that Tatkon Township had a population of 217,093. The population density was 120.5 people per km². The census reported that the median age was 28.1 years, and 92 males per 100 females. There were 51,747 households; the mean household size was 4.1.

=== Ethnic makeup ===
Ethnic composition of Pyinmana Township
Ethnic group	Percentage
Bamar	99.9%
Others	0.1%
Source: 2019 GAD township report

The Bamar effectively make up the entirety of the township's population.

== Economy ==
The primary economy of the township is agriculture, producing major crops such as rice, beans, sesame, and various other seasonal produce. Due to good transportation infrastructure, these goods can be easily exported and sold.

According to the 2014 census, approximately 50% of the working population in the township are agricultural and forestry workers, while about 20% are general laborers. Overall, the agriculture and forestry sector generates 64% of the total employment opportunities in the township.

During the era of the Myanmar kings, there was a saying that the kingdom relied on the "Four Great Twin" (basins/regions) for their exceptional rice yields: Le-twin, Taung-twin, Chindwin, and Baw-twin. It is understood that "Baw-twin" refers to the area surrounding the present-day Baw (Aung Myay Yeik Thar) Village, located to the east of the Nawin Creek in Tatkon Township.

== Culture ==
The predominant religion in Tatkon Township is Buddhism, with minority communities of Christians, Muslims, and Hindus. According to 2020 statistics, the township is home to 275 Buddhist monasteries and 14 nunneries. Additionally, there are 3 Christian churches, 6 mosques, and 2 Hindu temples.

Among the various seasonal festivals, the Tazaungdaing Festival is the most celebrated event in Tatkon Township. Held for five days from the 11th waxing day of Tazaungmon to the Full Moon day, the festival transforms the town into a bustling hub with traditional markets, A-nyeint and theatrical performances (Zat Pwe), funfairs, and live concerts. It is a highly anticipated event for the entire township. During this time, schools, government departments, organizations, and businesses prepare Padetha Trees (decorated donation trees) and parade them through the town before delivering them to the Township Sasana Beikman. These donations are then redistributed among all the monasteries across the township.

Historically, there was a tradition of trekking up Shwe Kyat Taung (Shwe Kyat Mountain) near Kinthar Village to pay homage on the Full Moon day of Waso. However, this custom faded away following the establishment of Nay Pyi Taw, as gravel quarrying sites increased around the mountain area. Other traditional festivals, such as Thingyan (the Water Festival) and Thadingyut (the Festival of Lights), continue to be observed annually.

== Transportation ==
=== Roadways ===
Tatkon Township is situated along the No. (12) Yangon–Mandalay National Highway, specifically between mileposts 267/0 and 288/5. The town of Tatkon itself lies on this highway, located 277 miles north of Yangon and 156 miles south of Mandalay.

Additionally, the Yangon–Mandalay Expressway passes through the township approximately 20 miles west of Tatkon. There is a bypass/junction connecting to Tatkon near milepost 233/4 of the expressway.

Other significant road networks include:

- No. (20) National Highway (Nay Pyi Taw–Pinlaung–Loikaw Road): This road begins at the Kinthar junction near Kinthar Village and stretches approximately 64 miles to Pinlaung. It is the primary arterial route connecting Nay Pyi Taw to Kayah State via the Pa-O region.
- No. (2) Inter-District Road: This also begins near Kinthar Village, heading north toward Shwe Myin Tin (Yamethin) and Hlaing Det (Thazi). However, it is primarily used by local villagers. A road connecting Kinthar through Shwe Kyat Taung to the military offices in Zeyarthiri Township can be considered an extension of this inter-district road.
- Bypass Roads: A direct bypass connects Tatkon to Ottarathiri Township. This route is famous for passing the Nay Pyi Taw Bodh Gaya replicas and a specific location known for a "magnetic field" phenomenon that purportedly defies gravity. There is also a direct road connecting Tatkon to Pobbathiri Township.

=== Railways ===
The section of the Yangon–Taungoo–Mandalay railway passing through Tatkon Township was constructed during the colonial era (1888–1889) and spans approximately 14.75 miles within the township.

The township features:

- One major station: Tatkon Railway Station.
- Four smaller stations: Nyaunglunt, Magyibin, Sinthe, and Shwemyo.

Tatkon Station is located 20 miles from Yamethin and 24 miles from Pyinmana. Historically, a 7-mile short-haul freight line ran from Nyaunglunt Village to the quarries at Nattaung; today, that route has been converted into a roadway connecting Nyaunglunt to Inter-District Road No. (2). A project to build a railway line from Tatkon to Pinlaung began in 2010 but was subsequently cancelled mid-project.

== Other Important Infrastructure ==
=== Bridges ===
The Ason Bridge on the Yangon-Mandalay Highway and the Sinthe Bridge on the Yangon-Mandalay Railway are the most vital bridges for the transportation network of Tatkon Township.

=== Electricity ===
Out of a total of 176 villages in the township, 122 villages have access to electricity through the national grid, and 28 villages utilize solar power systems, leaving 26 villages without electricity. Electricity for the township is primarily transmitted from the Shwemyo Main Substation and distributed via the Ngwetaung, Okshitkon, and Thayettaw substations.

=== Dams and Reservoirs ===
The primary dams and reservoirs in the township include the Sinthe Reservoir and Sinthe Diversion Dam, Kinthar Reservoir, Myo Hla Reservoir, and the Mon Flood Control Dam. The Sinthe Reservoir and Diversion Dam are the main sources of reliance for local agricultural activities, providing irrigation to farmlands on the western side of Nawin Creek. Areas on the eastern side of Nawin Creek receive agricultural water from the Kinthar Reservoir and Mon Flood Control Dam, as well as the Pwe Sar Diversion Dam (which diverts water from Le Nge Creek near Ohn Pin Village) and the Nyaung Kai Diversion Dam (which diverts water from Nyaung Kai Creek near Nyaung Kai Village).

== Education ==
According to 2020 statistics, the basic education infrastructure in Tatkon Township includes 14 high schools, 14 branch high schools, 15 middle schools, 18 branch middle schools, 61 primary schools, and 39 post-primary schools. Additionally, there are monastic education schools in Shwe Myo, Kyauk Sa Rit Kone, Tha Phan Chaung, and Oushit Kone villages. Within Tatkon town, there are two high schools. Furthermore, there is one high school each at No. (1) Defense Industry and Myanmar Radio and Television (MRTV). The remaining 10 high schools are located in the villages of Shwe Myo, Nyaung Lunt, Aing Kyal, Taung Po Thar, Ma Gyi Pin, Shar Taw, Than Pu Yar Kone, Alal Kyun, Htone Bo, and Kinthar.

The Agricultural Research Farm in Tatkon is a sub-division of the Upland Crops Research Division under the Department of Agricultural Research. Since the colonial era around 1937, this site served as a Central Agricultural Garden and hosted a 10-month agricultural (rural development) training school. It covers a total area of approximately 120 acres and is situated within Aung Zeya Ward, Tatkon.

== Health ==
In Tatkon Township, there are 2 hospitals and 4 Rural Health Centers. The Township Public Hospital (100-bed) is located in Tatkon. In 2011, it was relocated from its original site in Aung Zeya Ward to the Mya Thida Park area at the northern exit of the town. The former hospital site continues to be utilized as a Monastic Hospital and a Maternal and Child Health Center. The second hospital is a 16-bed Station Hospital located in Shwe Myo Village. Additionally, there are Rural Health Centers situated in Nyaung Lunt, Myauk Myite, Taung Po Thar, and Aing Kyal villages.

== Sports and Recreation ==
Football, Chinlone (traditional cane ball), and volleyball are the most popular sports within the township. A township sports ground, covering approximately 10 acres, is located in Myawaddy Ward, Tatkon.

Regarding public parks, the original Mya Thida Park at the northern exit of the town was repurposed as the site for the 100-bed Township Hospital. Since then, a new official township park has not yet been established. However, between 2018 and 2019, the area surrounding Aung Gyi Kan (Aung Gyi Lake) in Saya San Ward, Tatkon, was renovated and preserved as a public recreational space for relaxation.

== Landmarks and Notable Sites ==
Nyaung Lunt Tawya Monastery: This is a prominent forest monastery where the renowned Nyaung Lunt Tawya Sayadaw U Maydhawi, widely revered as an Arahant (a perfected person), resided. Located about one mile west of Nyaung Lunt Village, the monastery grounds span approximately 80 acres.

MRTV Headquarters (Nay Pyi Taw): Although commonly referred to as "Nay Pyi Taw Myanma Athan" due to its early radio trial broadcasts, this is the main headquarters for both radio and television broadcasting in Myanmar. Relocated from Yangon in 2008, it is situated near Thaw Tar Village, about 4 miles northwest of Tatkon.

Moegaung Pagoda: Located at the northern entrance of Tatkon along the Yangon–Mandalay Highway. It is said to be built on the hill where King Alaungpaya (U Aung Zeya) once camped during a military expedition. The name "Tatkon" (meaning "Army Hill") likely originates from this event. The pagoda is named "Moegaung" (meaning "Good Rain") because locals traditionally offer prayers there for rain during years of drought.

Byaing Inn Pyi Lone Chan Thar Pagoda: Situated near Byaing Inn Village, about 3 miles east of Tatkon. Legend says the name evolved from "Pyaing Inn" (Competing Lake), where a Bodhisattva buffalo and the Devadatta buffalo once competed. It is a popular site for making solemn vows. The site features ancient stupas and the 25-acre Byaing Inn Lake.

Maha Myat Muni Pagoda (Nyaung Lunt): Located in Nyaung Lunt Village, about 8 miles north of Tatkon, this large Buddha image was enshrined by the famous hermit Hermit U Khandi. A pagoda festival is held annually from the 11th to the 15th waning day of Tazaungmon.

U Khandi’s Birthplace Pagoda (Pyaw Ywar): Located near Pyaw Ywar and Padauk Kone villages, about 3 miles west of Nyaung Lunt. This is the birthplace of Hermit U Khandi (formerly Ywa Thar Village in Yamethin Township). While the original village has disappeared, the site remains a place of worship within the current Tatkon boundaries.

Thar Kho Taung Pagoda (Ohn Pin): Located near Ohn Pin Village, 13 miles northeast of Tatkon. According to the Mahisa Jataka, this was the hiding place of the young Bodhisattva buffalo escaping the wrath of the Devadatta buffalo, hence the name "Thar Kho Taung" (Mountain where the son hid). Several local place names are tied to this legend:

- Ohn Pin: The cave where the son hid.
- Byaing Inn (formerly Pyaing Inn): Where they competed.
- Kywe Lall Pin: Where the Devadatta buffalo's neck was injured.
- Cho Kya Inn: Where its horns fell off.
- Ma Yoe Kone (formerly A-Yoe Kone): Where its bones fell.

Maha Theim Taw Gyi Pagoda (Nyaung Kai): Also known as Aung Taw Theim, this Bagan-style pagoda is 5 miles north of Tatkon. Nearby is "Thar Taw Ya Lake," named to commemorate the birth of a royal son when King Bodawpaya traveled to Toungoo in 1789 after renovating the Meiktila Lake.

Phaung Taw Oo Pagoda (Phaung Taw): Located near Phaung Taw Village, 5 miles north of Tatkon. It is believed to have been built by King Alaungsithu of the Bagan Dynasty during a royal voyage. The architectural style closely mirrors that of the Bagan era.

Dah Lay Let Pagoda (Ma Gyi Kone): Situated 5 miles east of Tatkon in Ma Gyi Kone Village. Four swords are traditionally hung there as offerings. Historically, locals would come to this pagoda to swear oaths and settle legal disputes or arguments.

Shwe Kyat Taung Pagoda (Kinthar): These pagodas are located on Shwe Kyat Taung (Kinthar Mountain) near Kinthar Village, 7 miles southeast of Tatkon. They were reportedly built by Min Nge Kyaw Htin, the Governor of Yamethin, during the reign of King Narapati of Ava. The tradition of trekking the mountain on the Full Moon day of Waso has ceased due to expanding stone quarrying operations in the area.

U Aung Zeya Pagoda (Aung Myay Yeik Thar/Baw): Located near Aung Myay Yeik Thar Village, 4 miles east of Tatkon. It is said to have been built by King Alaungpaya during a stopover on his return from the war with Siam (Thailand).

== Notable Figures ==
- Nyaung Lunt Tawya Sayadaw: A prominent Theravada Buddhist monk and Elder (Mahathera) widely revered as an Arahant (one who has achieved spiritual perfection).
- U Khandi (The Great Hermit): A renowned Theravada Buddhist missionary and religious architect, famous for his leadership in renovating and building pagodas across Myanmar (including Mandalay Hill).
- Taungdwingyi Ko Ko Gyi: A well-known writer and author (1931–1981).
