= Naypyidaw Council =

Executive body that administers Naypyidaw Union Territory, Myanmar

Nay Pyi Taw Council
- နေပြည်တော်ကောင်စီ

Agency overview
- Type: Council
- Jurisdiction: Naypyidaw Union Territory
- Headquarters: Naypyidaw
- Agency executive: Dr. Maung Maung Naing, Chairman
- Parent agency: Presidents Office
- Website: nptcouncil.gov.mm

The Naypyidaw Council (Burmese: နေပြည်တော်ကောင်စီ, officially spelt Nay Pyi Taw Council) is the executive body under the President of Myanmar that administers the Naypyidaw Union Territory, the first-level administrative division of Myanmar that houses the national capital city of Naypyidaw.

The Council is formed by the President, who appoints members based on constitutional requirements. The President must nominate both civilian and Tatmadaw personnel into the Council membership. The Council, which is headed by a Chairperson, reports directly to the President. The Constitution also stipulates that the Naypyidaw Council shares offices with the Ministry of Home Affairs' General Administration Department (GAD), and that the head of GAD serves as an ex-officio secretary of the Naypyidaw Council.

== Powers ==
The Naypyidaw Council has several powers, given to it by the 2008 Constitution of Myanmar and the 2010 Nay Pyi Taw Council Law passed by the State Peace and Development Council (SPDC).

The powers are:

1. General Administration: It implements matters relating to the general administration of the Naypyidaw Union Territory.
2. State Stability: It holds the duty to assist in preserving state stability, community peace, tranquility, and the prevalence of law and order.
3. Government Coordination: It complies with decisions, settlements, and coordination from the Union Government regarding administrative disputes between regions, states, or self-administered areas and Naypyidaw.
4. Reporting: It submits regular situation reports directly to the President of the Union.
5. Development and Public Works: Working alongside or through related bodies like the Naypyidaw Development Committee, responsibilities include urban planning, infrastructure development, water supply management, and regional public projects.

== See also ==
- Government of Myanmar
