= Naypyidaw Development Committee =

Administrative body of the Burmese capital

Nay Pyi Taw Development Committee
- နေပြည်တော်စည်ပင်သာယာရေးကော်မတီ

Agency overview
- Formed: December 29, 2009; 16 years ago
- Jurisdiction: City of Naypyidaw
- Headquarters: Naypyidaw City Hall
- Agency executive: Dr. Maung Maung Naing, Chairman
- Website: www.nptdc.gov.mm

The Nay Pyi Taw Development Committee (Burmese: နေပြည်တော်စည်ပင်သာယာရေးကော်မတီ; officially spelt Nay Pyi Taw Development Committee, abbreviated NPTDC) is the administrative body of Naypyidaw, the administrative capital of Myanmar (Burma). NPTDC is separate from the Naypyidaw Council.

== History ==
NPTDC was established by the State Peace and Development Council, under the Nay Pyi Taw Development Law, which was issued on 29 December 2009. Consisting of 5 to 9 members, it is led by a Chairman who acts as the Mayor, and a Vice-Chairman who acts as the Vice-Mayor.

== Powers ==
The Naypyidaw Development Committee has the following powers, which were given to it by the 2009 Nay Pyi Taw Development Law which was passed by the State Peace and Development Council (SPDC).

The powers of the committee are:

- Regulatory Oversight
- Zoning and Land Management
- Engineering Permits
- Civil Services
- Business Licensing
- Local Taxation and Valuation
- Financial Services
- State Enterprises
- Healthcare and Public Facilities

== Organization ==
The committee is divided into:

1. Mayor's Office
2. Administration Department
3. Budget and Accounts Department
4. Inspection Department
5. Co-ordination Department
6. Assessor Department
7. Revenue Department
8. Markets Department
9. Veterinary and Slaughter House Department
10. Pollution Control and Cleansing Department
11. Engineering Department (Roads and Bridges)
12. Engineering Department (Buildings)
13. Engineering Department (Water and Sanitation)
14. Motor Transport and Workshop Department
15. Central Stores Department
16. Playgrounds, Parks, and Garden Department
17. Health Department
18. Security and Disciplinary Department
19. City Planning and Land Administration Department
20. Public Relations and Information Department
21. Production Department
22. Naypyidaw Sibin Bank
23. Zabuthiri Specialist Hospital
24. Cement Factory (Naypyidaw)
25. Brick Factory (Naypyidaw)
26. City Golf Course

== See also ==
- Naypyidaw
- Mandalay City Development Committee
- Yangon City Development Committee
- Myanmar International Convention Centre 2
