= Mandalay City Development Committee =

Government agency of Myanmar

- မန္တလေးမြို့ စည်ပင်သာယာရေး ကော်မတီ

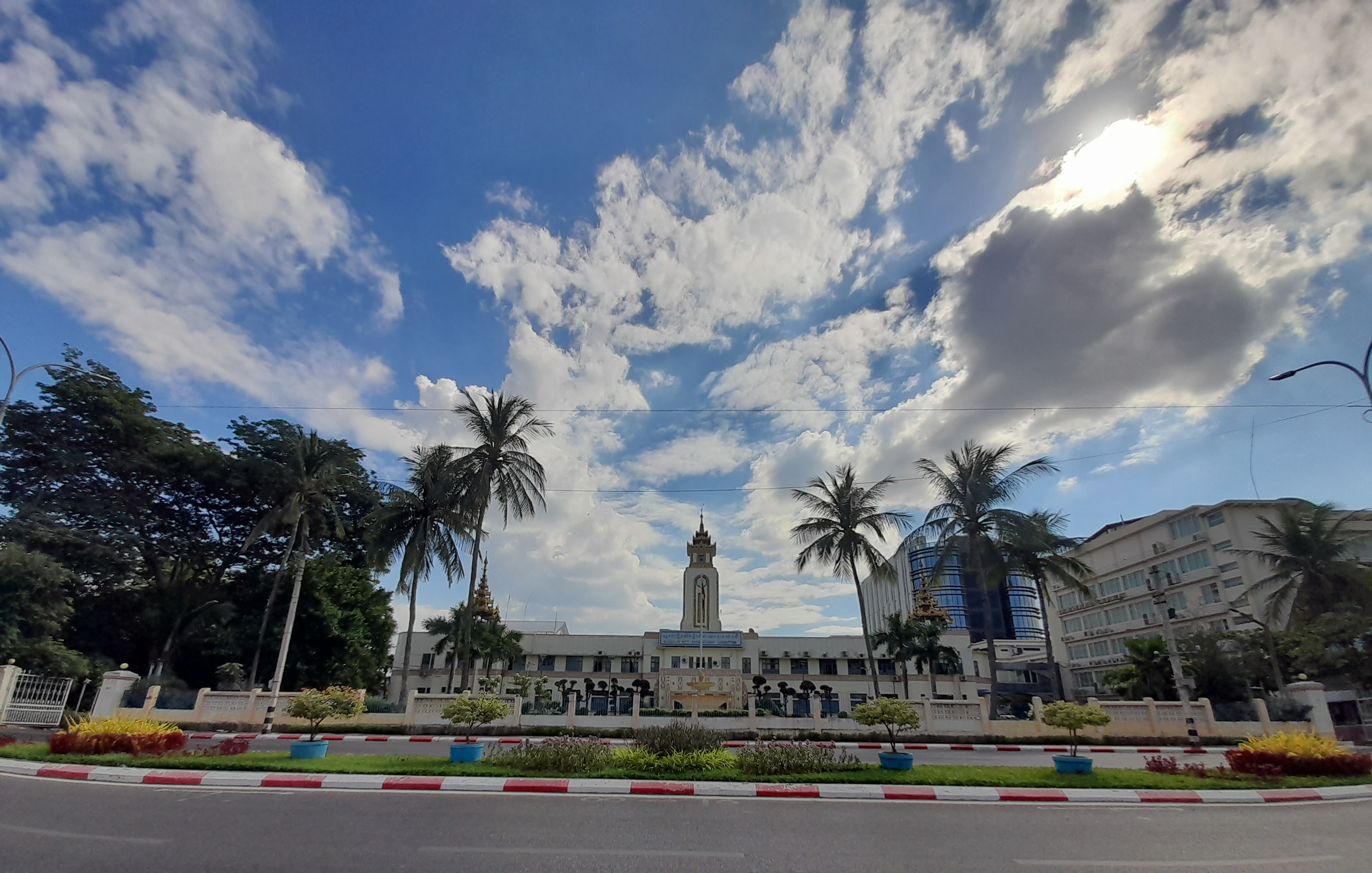
- Office of the Mandalay City Development Committee

Agency overview
- Formed: December 29, 1992; 33 years ago
- Jurisdiction: City of Mandalay
- Headquarters: Mandalay City Hall; 21.9820473°N 96.0973896°E
- Agency executive: Khin Maung Aye, Chairman
- Website: www.emcdc.com

The Mandalay City Development Committee (Burmese: မန္တလေးမြို့ စည်ပင်သာယာရေး ကော်မတီ; abbreviated MCDC) is the administrative body of Mandalay, the second largest city in Myanmar (Burma). MCDC has wide-ranging responsibilities, including city planning, land administration, tax collection, and urban development. MCDC raises its own revenues through tax collection, fees, licenses and property development. MCDC's chairman acts as Mayor of Mandalay, and sits as Regional Minister for the Government of Mandalay Region. MCDC's mission is to make the city clean, to keep the city beautiful, and to enable city dwellers to enjoy a pleasant life.

== History ==
MCDC was established first established by the State Law and Order Restoration Council's 1992 City of Mandalay Development Law. In 2002, the said law was repealed by State Peace and Development Council and replaced with the 2002 City of Mandalay Development Law. Mandalay Region Hluttaw enacted the new MCDC law in 2014 December. MCDC was formed by the Mandalay Regional Government, and legally comprises 13 to 15 members, including a chairman who acts as the Minister (Mayor), and a vice-chairman, who acts as the Vice-Mayor.

== Departments ==
1. Administration Department
2. Motor Transport & Workshop Department
3. Market and Slaughter House Department
4. Finance Department
5. Revenue Department
6. Cleansing Department
7. Playgrounds, Parks and Gardens Department
8. Building and Central Stores Department
9. Roads and Bridges Department
10. Water and Sanitation Department
11. Urban Planning and Land Administration Department
12. Public Relations and Information Department
13. Inspection Department
14. Agriculture and Livestock Breeding Department

== Projects ==
In 2017, the Mandalay City Development Committee approved a public-private partnership with Mandalay Business Capital City Development Company (MBCCD), owned by Maung Weik, for a 10-year mega-development project in Amarapura, projected to include hotels, hospitals, schools, jetties, shopping centres, gardens and apartment buildings on a plot of 2,000 acres (810 ha) allocated by the Mandalay city government.

== Gallery ==
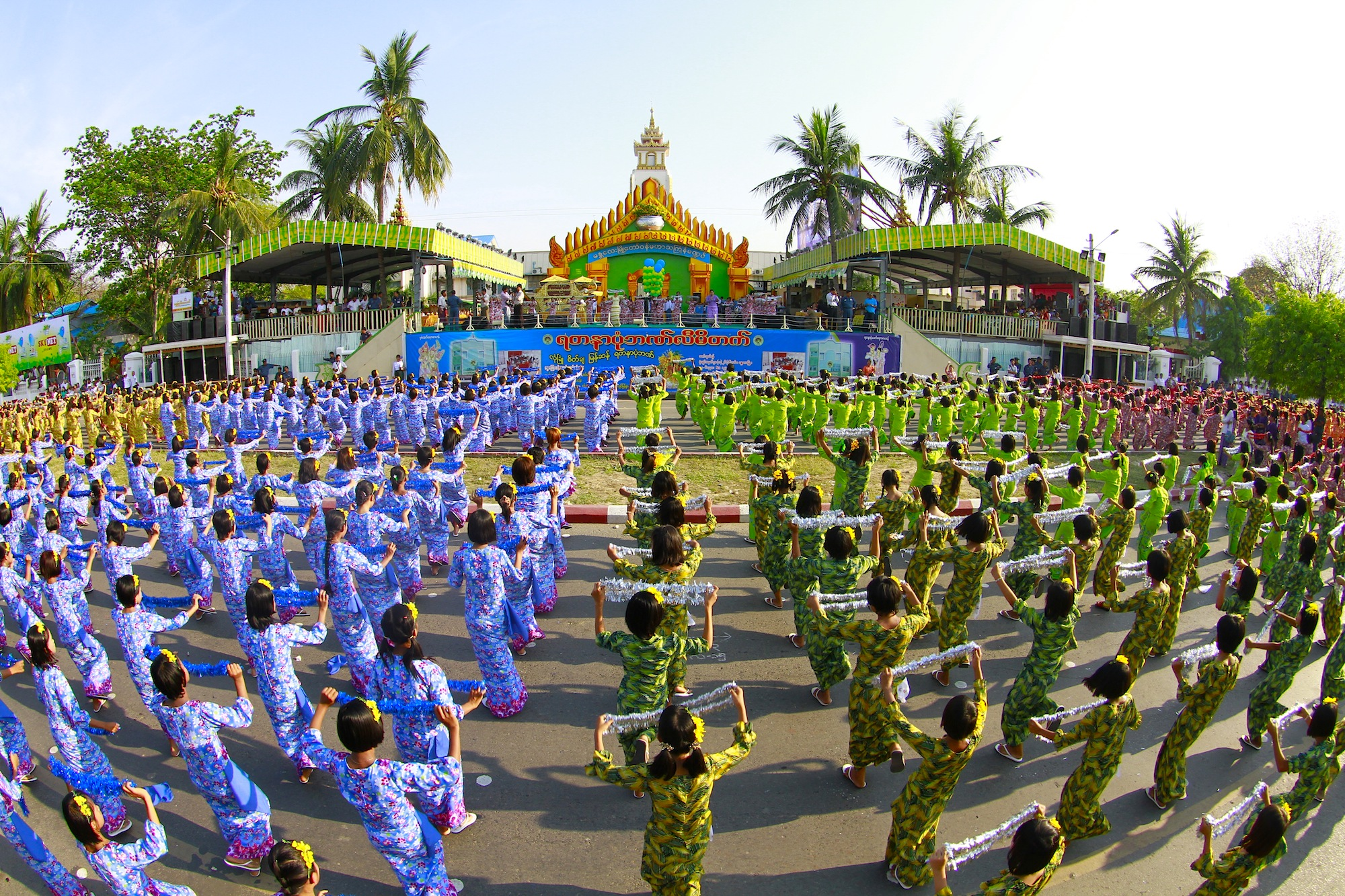
Opening Ceremony of Myanmar Thingyan Festival in front of the Mandalay City Hall

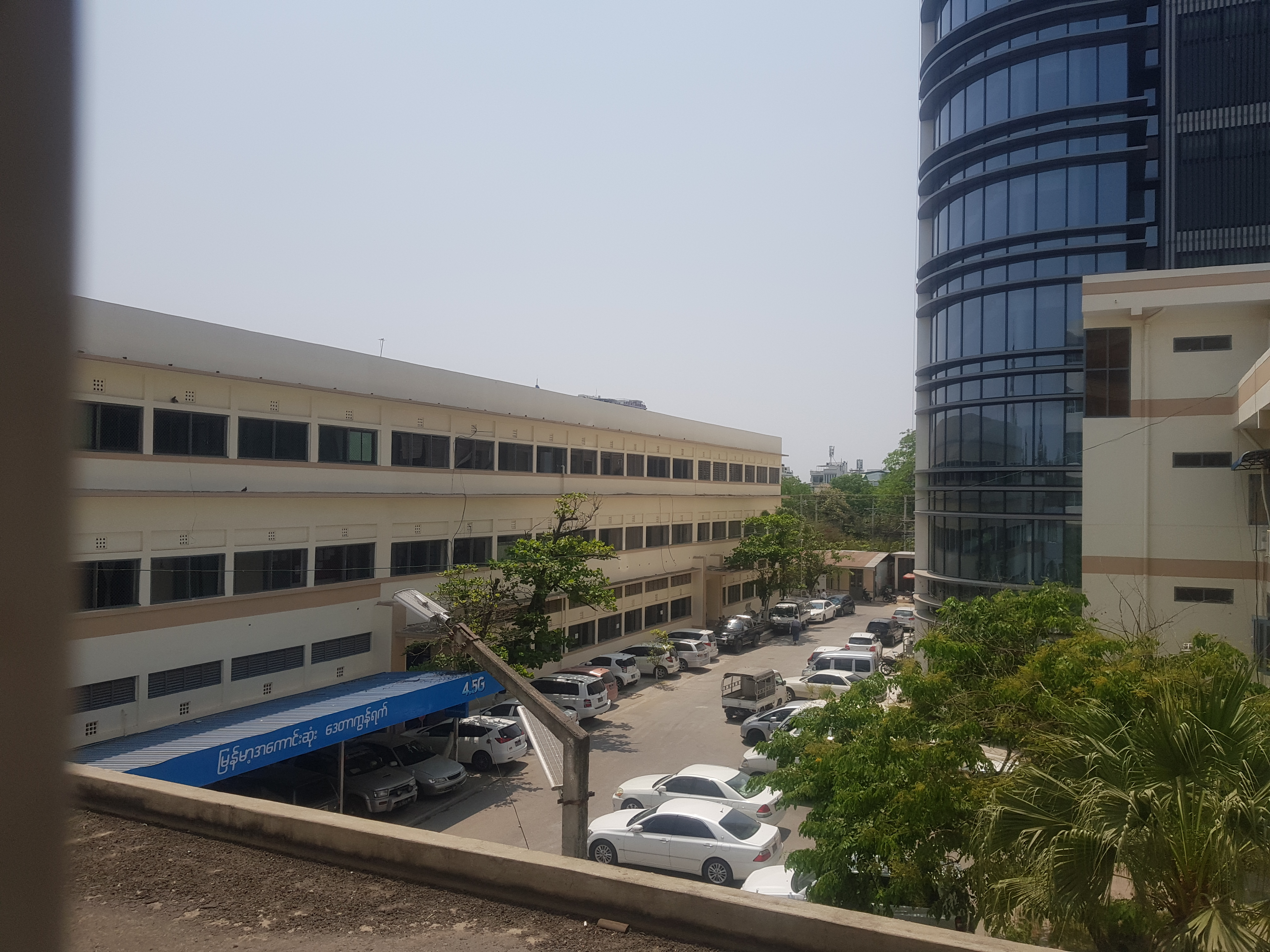
MCDC Office

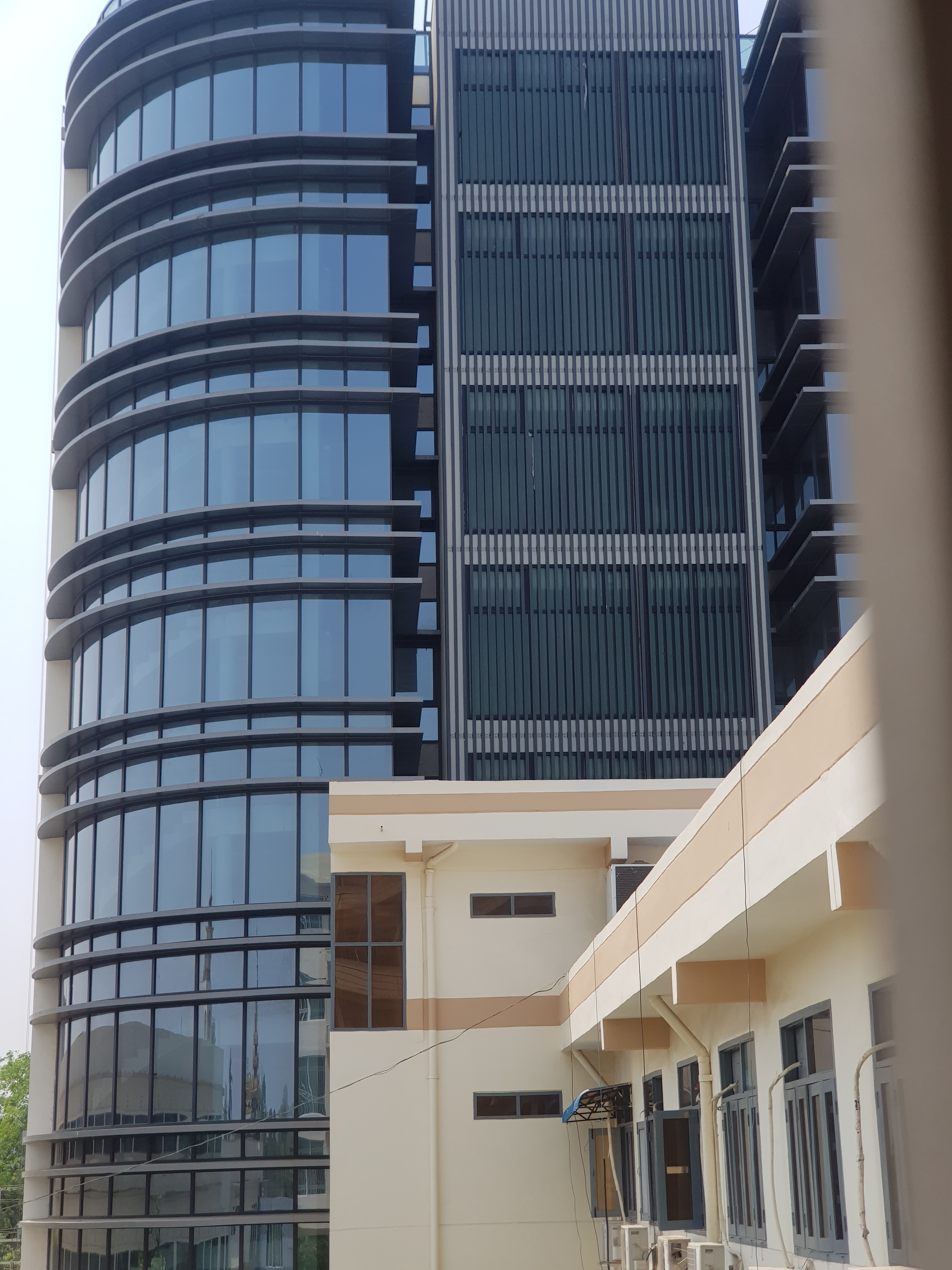
MCDC Office

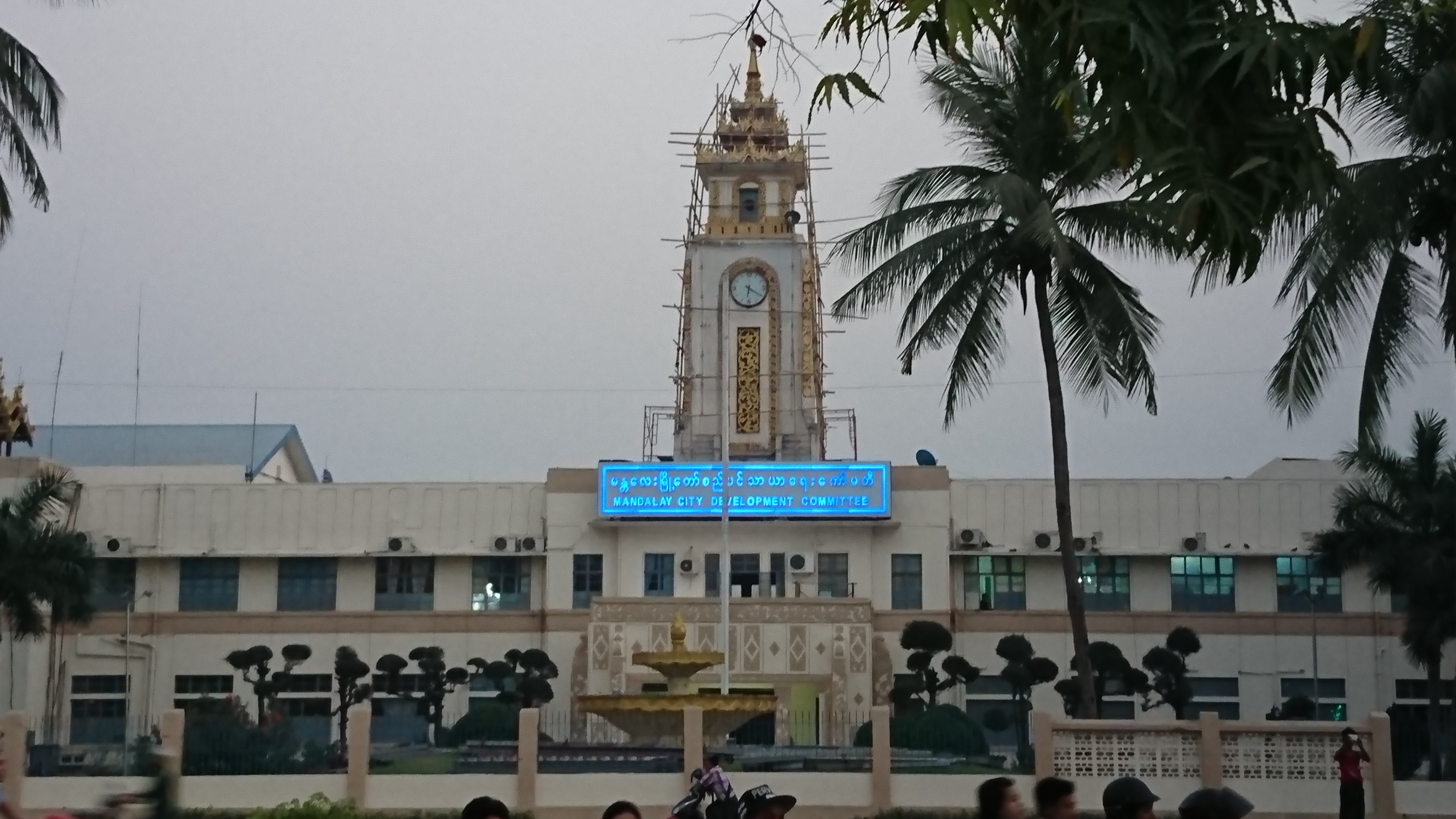
MCDC Office

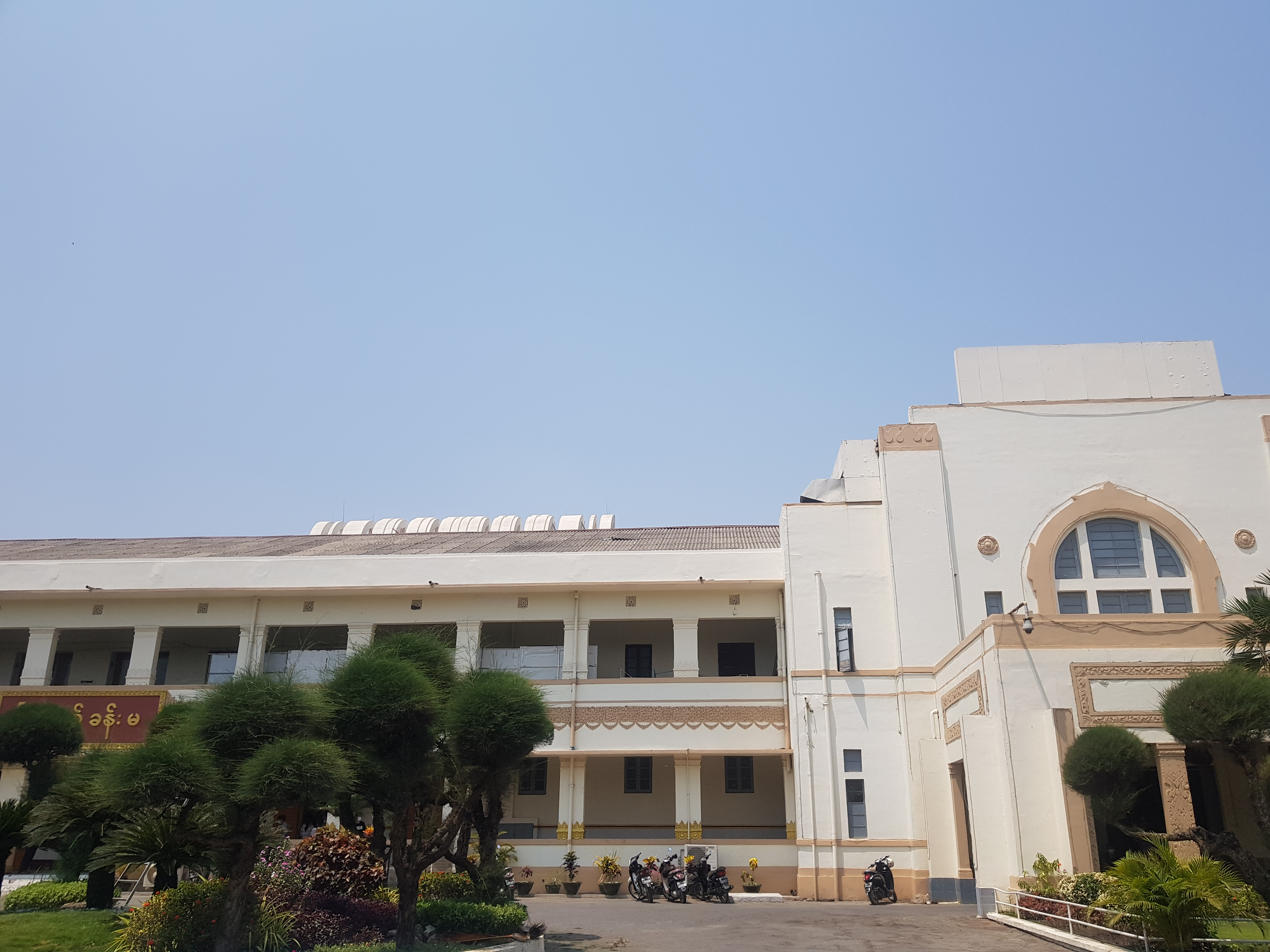
Mandalay City Hall

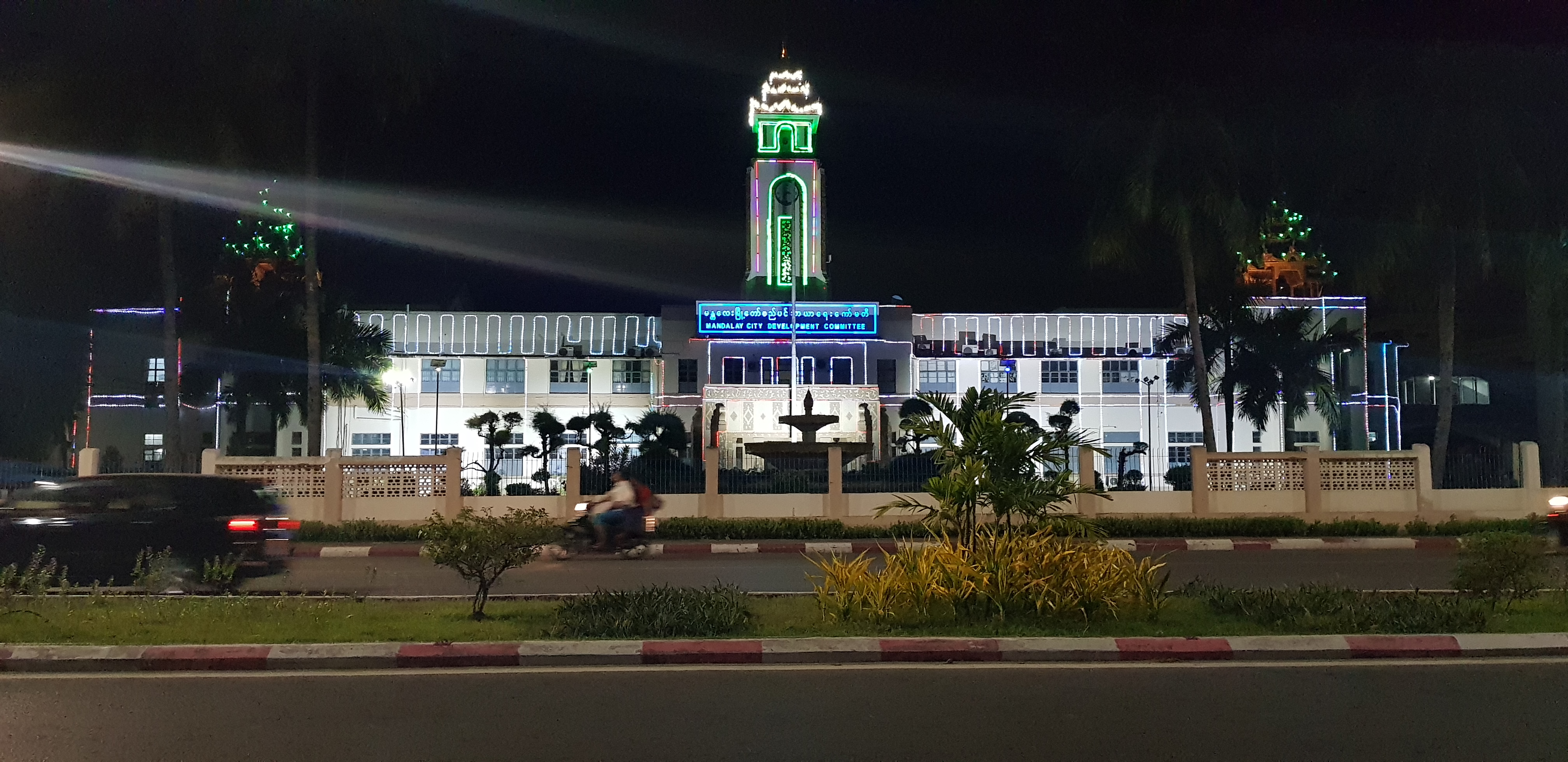

== See also ==
- Mandalay
- Mandalay Region
- Mayor of Mandalay
- Yangon City Development Committee
- Naypyidaw Development Committee
- Mandalay Convention Centre
