= General Administration Department =

Government agency of Myanmar

- အထွေထွေအုပ်ချုပ်ရေးဦးစီးဌာန

Agency overview
- Type: Department
- Jurisdiction: Government of Myanmar
- Headquarters: Naypyidaw
- Parent agency: Ministry of Home Affairs
- Website: www.gad.gov.mm

The General Administration Department (Burmese: အထွေထွေအုပ်ချုပ်ရေးဦးစီးဌာန, abbreviated GAD) is a civil service body that staffs all regional and state-level governments in Myanmar and provides administration for the country's myriad districts and townships.

It also plays a central role in administering the country's administrative capital of Naypyidaw, as the Constitution of Myanmar stipulates that the head of GAD is the secretary of the Naypyidaw Council and that the GAD offices are to be co-located with the Naypyidaw Council offices.The directors of State and Region GAD offices are also the secretaries of State and Region governments. On 28 December 2018, it was reorganized and reinvoked under the Ministry of the Office of the Union Government after being detached from the Ministry of Home Affairs. On 5 May 2021, the SAC reorganized it under Ministry of Home Affairs.

== See also ==
- Ministry of Home Affairs
- Cabinet of Myanmar
