= Naypyidaw =

Capital of Naypyidaw Union Territory, Myanmar

Naypyidaw နေပြည်တော် NPT
- Capital city
- Nay Pyi Taw
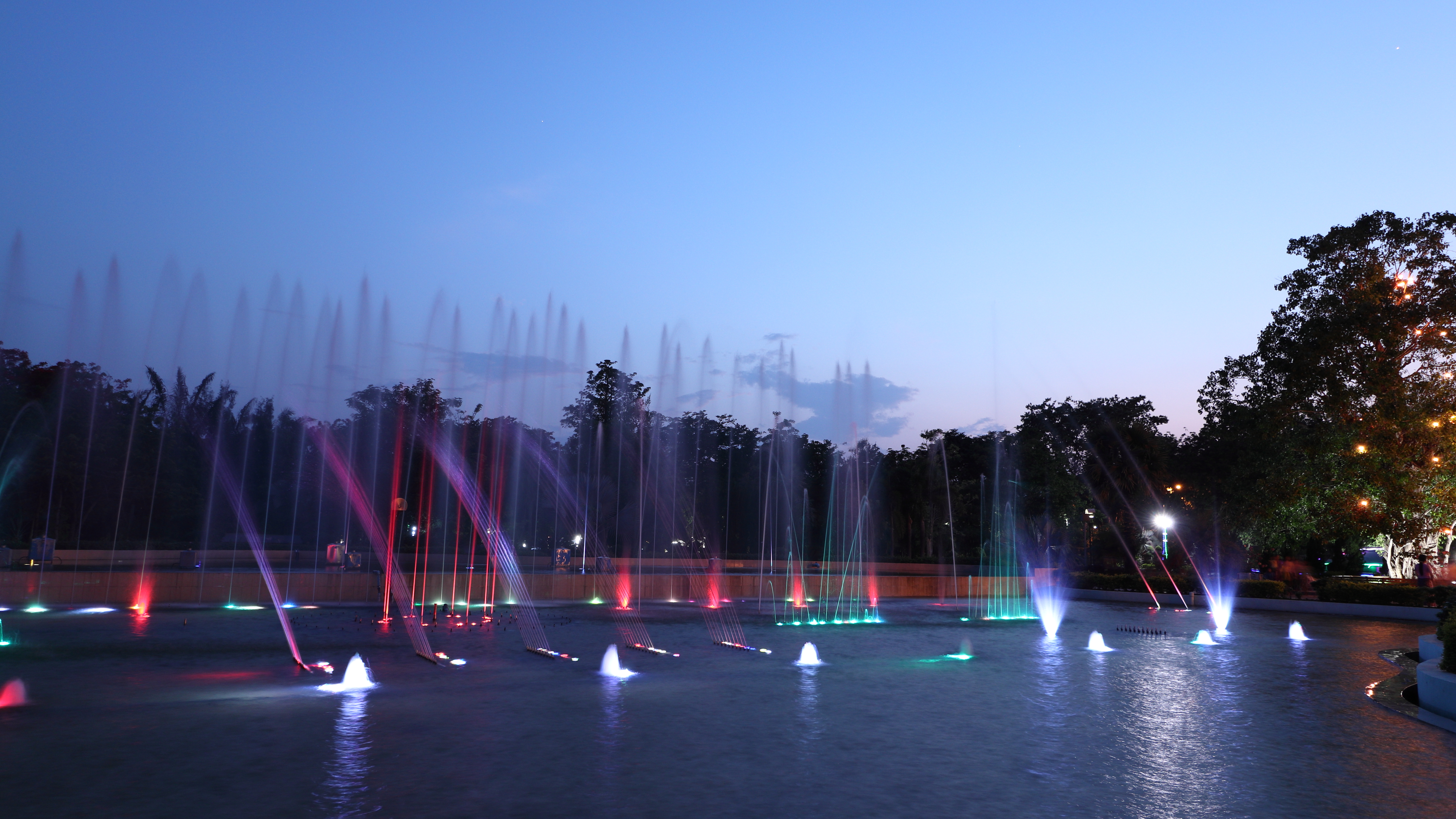
- Water Fountain Garden Wunna Theikdi Indoor Stadium Central railway station Gems Museum

- Flag Seal

- Location of Naypyidaw in Myanmar Location in Asia
- Coordinates: 19°44′51″N 96°06′54″E
- Country: Myanmar
- Division: Naypyidaw Union Territory
- Subdivisions: 8 townships
- Settled: 2005
- Incorporated: 2008
- Seat: Nay Pyi Taw City Hall

Government
  - Body: Naypyidaw Development Committee
  - Mayor: U Kan Myint Than (USDP)
  - Deputy Mayor: U Win Moe Khaing (I)

Area
  - Total: 7,054.37 km^{2} (2,723.71 sq mi)
- Elevation: 115 m (377 ft)

Population
  - Total: 358,679
  - Density: 131.1/km^{2} (340/sq mi)
- Time zone: UTC+06:30 (MMT)
- Area code: 067

Naypyidaw (/ˈneɪpjɪdɔː/ NAYP-yid-aw), (Note: Burmese: နေပြည်တော်, MLCTS: Nepranytau, Latin: Neipyidau, pronounced [nè.pjì.dɔ̀].) officially romanised as Nay Pyi Taw (NPT), (Note: Also spelled as Naypyitaw and Nay Pyi Daw.) is the capital and third-largest city of Myanmar. The city is located at the centre of the Naypyidaw Union Territory. It is unusual among Myanmar's cities in that it is an entirely planned city and not part of any state or region. The city, previously known only as Pyinmana District, officially replaced Yangon as the administrative capital of Myanmar on 6 November 2005; its official name was revealed to the public on Armed Forces Day, 27 March 2006.

As the seat of the government of Myanmar, Naypyidaw is the site of the Assembly of the Union, the Supreme Court, the Presidential Palace, the official residences of the Cabinet and the headquarters of government ministries and military. Naypyidaw is notable for its unusual combination of large size and very low population density. The city hosted the 24th and 25th ASEAN Summit, the 3rd BIMSTEC Summit, the Ninth East Asia Summit, the 2013 Southeast Asian Games and the 2014 AFC U-19 Championship.

== Etymology ==
Naypyidaw is Burmese for "abode of the king", and is generally translated as "royal capital", "seat of the king", or "abode of kings". Traditionally, it was used as a suffix to the names of royal capitals, such as Mandalay, which was called Yadanabon Naypyidaw (ရတနာပုံနေပြည်တော်).

== History ==
Naypyidaw was founded on a greenfield site near Pyinmana, about 320 kilometres (200 mi) north of the old capital, Yangon. Construction started in 2002 and was completed by 2012. Military construction projects were overseen by the Quartermaster General Tin Aung Myint Oo, while civilian construction projects were overseen by Thein Nyunt, an army colonel. Construction of the city was carried out by three main groups, including the military's engineering corps, contractors with familial ties to high-ranking military officials, and the military's conglomerate, Myanma Economic Holdings Limited. Construction was plagued with corruption and nepotism. It is estimated that the planned city development reached US$4 billion.

On 27 March 2006, more than 12,000 troops marched in the new capital in its first public event: a massive military parade to mark Armed Forces Day, the anniversary of Burma's 1945 revolution against the Japanese occupation. Filming was restricted to the concrete parade ground, which contains enormous sculptures of Kings Anawrahta, Bayinnaung, and Alaungpaya. The city was officially named "Naypyidaw" during these ceremonies, and the official, albeit mostly administrative, capital of the country was relocated from Yangon to Naypyidaw.

=== Rationale behind moving the capital ===
There are several assumptions why the capital was moved. Naypyidaw is more centrally located than the old capital, Yangon. It is also a transportation hub located adjacent to the Shan, Kayah, and Kayin states. It was felt by governmental and military leaders that a stronger military and governmental presence nearby might provide stability to those chronically turbulent regions. The military's purpose appears to have been to build an impregnable citadel, able to withstand foreign invasion or popular uprisings. The official explanation for moving the capital was that Yangon had become too congested and crowded with little room for future expansion of government offices. Historian Michael Aung-Thwin posits that the relocation to central Myanmar represented a historic return to the Dry Zone, where previous Burmese royal capitals had traditionally been established over a millennium. The nearby town of Pyinmana is a long-standing settlement and had been a pre-colonial governorship that dates to the Pagan kingdom era.

=== 2025 earthquake ===
The city suffered extensive damage in the 2025 Myanmar earthquake on 28 March, with 80% of government buildings in the city damaged. Naypyidaw had the second highest death toll as a result of the quake. As of April 2025, 75 temporary relief camps had been set up to shelter 2,900 impacted families, while another 23,800 families had been relocated. The residential areas of Zabuthiri Township and Bawgatheikdi wards, where several apartment buildings collapsed, were especially impacted by the earthquake. The earthquake prompted Myanmar's military leader, Min Aung Hlaing, to order a redrawing of the city's layout. Following the earthquake, all government ministry websites and state-run MRTV and Myawaddy online broadcasts went offline.

Among the significant structures that were damaged included the Presidential Palace, the Pyidaungsu Hluttaw, the national legislature, and the mansion residences of high-ranking military officials, including Than Shwe, Maung Aye, Thein Sein, and Tin Aye. In mid-April, a Ministry of Construction assessment found that one-third of government staff buildings in nine of Naypyidaw's wards were rendered uninhabitable or destroyed. Many government offices, including the Central Bank, and the ministries of foreign affairs, hotels and tourism, immigration and population, and commerce, planned to relocate to Yangon, due to damage to offices and staff housing complexes.

Officials representing the United Wa State Army and the National Democratic Alliance Army funded the reconstruction of military council housing in Naypyidaw.

== Geography ==
Naypyidaw is located between the Bago Yoma and Shan Yoma mountain ranges. The city covers an area of 7,054 square kilometres (2,724 sq mi) and has a population of 924,608, according to official figures.

Chaungmagyi Dam is located a few kilometres to the north of Naypyidaw, while Ngalaik Dam is a few kilometres to the south. The Yezin Dam is farther away in the north-east.

=== Climate ===
Naypyidaw has a tropical savanna climate (Köppen Aw), with a wet season from May to October. The dry season from November to April begins with very warm afternoons and comfortable mornings, but in the build-up to the wet season temperatures become sweltering. In the wet season temperatures are merely hot but much higher humidity makes for conditions equally unpleasant, although rainfall is not nearly so extreme as in coastal Myanmar cities like Mawlamyine or Sittwe.

Climate data for Naypyidaw, Myanmar
Month	Jan	Feb	Mar	Apr	May	Jun	Jul	Aug	Sep	Oct	Nov	Dec	Year
Mean daily maximum °C (°F)	29.1 (84.4)	32.6 (90.7)	35.9 (96.6)	37.4 (99.3)	33.3 (91.9)	29.3 (84.7)	28.2 (82.8)	28.2 (82.8)	29.1 (84.4)	29.8 (85.6)	29.9 (85.8)	28.8 (83.8)	31.0 (87.7)
Daily mean °C (°F)	21.5 (70.7)	24.2 (75.6)	28.0 (82.4)	30.6 (87.1)	28.2 (82.8)	25.7 (78.3)	25.1 (77.2)	25.0 (77.0)	25.5 (77.9)	25.7 (78.3)	24.4 (75.9)	22.1 (71.8)	25.5 (77.9)
Mean daily minimum °C (°F)	14.4 (57.9)	16.0 (60.8)	20.1 (68.2)	24.2 (75.6)	24.4 (75.9)	23.7 (74.7)	23.2 (73.8)	23.1 (73.6)	23.1 (73.6)	22.2 (72.0)	19.2 (66.6)	16.0 (60.8)	20.8 (69.5)
Average rainfall mm (inches)	10 (0.4)	2 (0.1)	6 (0.2)	21 (0.8)	165 (6.5)	283 (11.1)	309 (12.2)	301 (11.9)	225 (8.9)	122 (4.8)	29 (1.1)	9 (0.4)	1,482 (58.4)
Average rainy days	1	0	1	3	14	20	21	21	19	15	4	1	120
Average relative humidity (%)	57	43	38	43	70	87	89	89	87	84	72	63	69
Mean monthly sunshine hours	298	289	332	327	279	198	193	208	234	279	282	291	3,210
Source: "Climate Data for Naypyidaw, Myanmar". Climate-Data.org.

== Cityscape ==
Naypyidaw is organised into a number of zones.

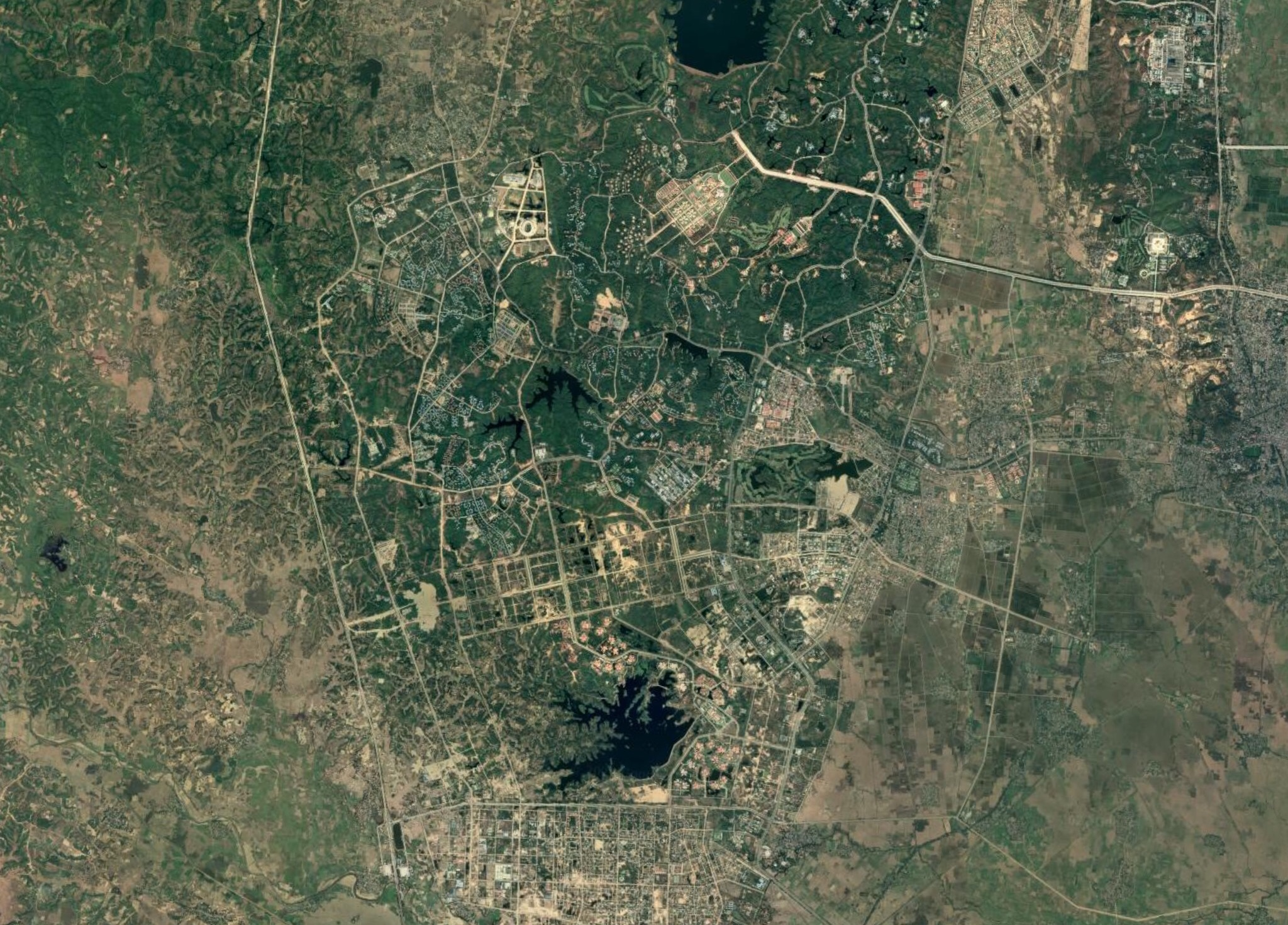
Naypyidaw Aerial Image

=== Residential zones ===
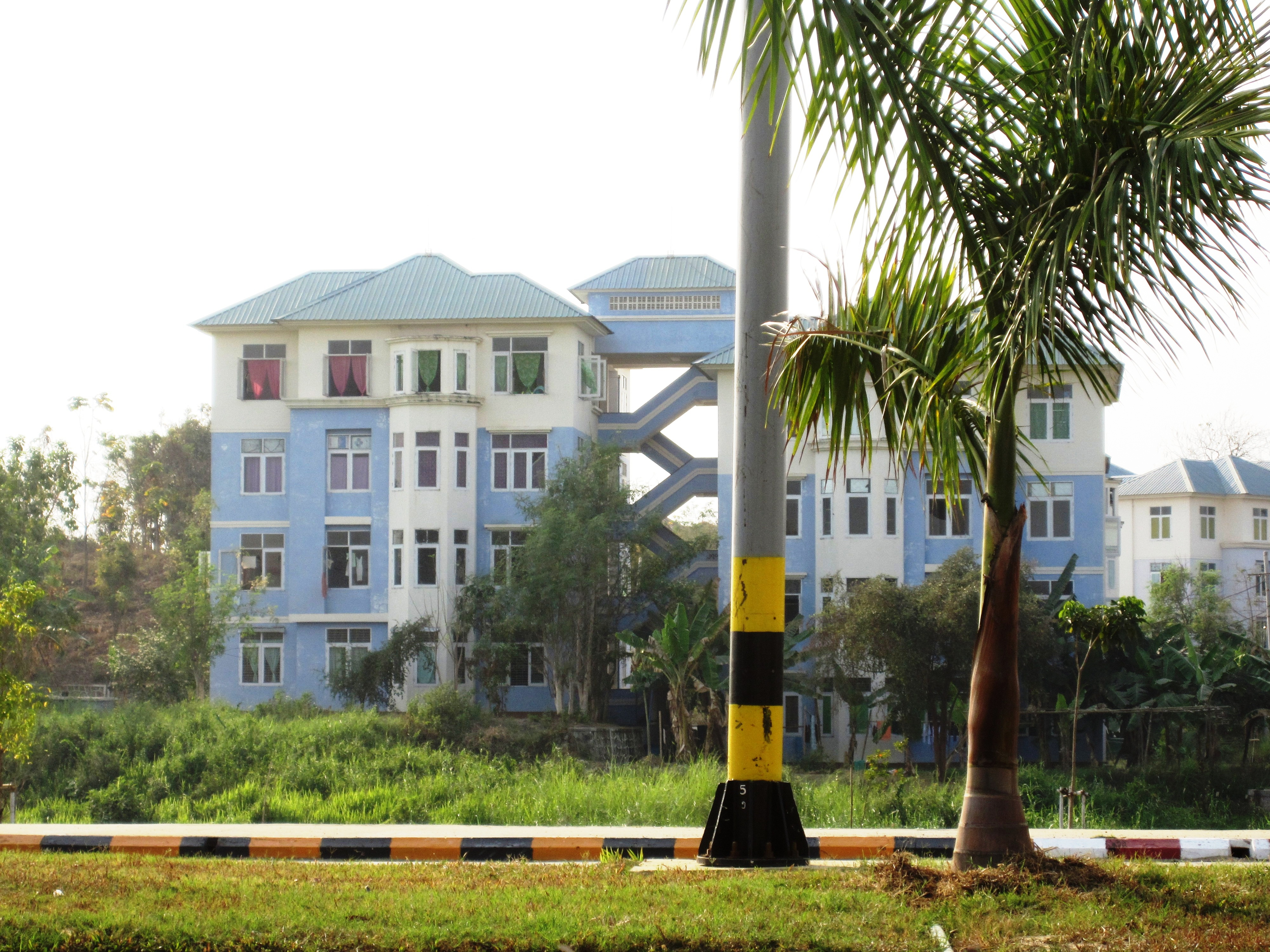
Apartment building in Naypyidaw

The residential areas are carefully organised, and apartments are allotted according to rank and marital status. The city has 1,200 four-story apartment blocks. The roofs of apartment buildings are colour-coded by the jobs of their residents: Ministry of Health employees live in buildings with blue roofs and Ministry of Agriculture employees live in those with green roofs. High-ranking government officials live in mansions, of which there are about 50. However, in 2019, quite a few of the ministerial mansions were reported to be unused and left in a neglected state in overgrown compounds.

=== Ministry zone ===
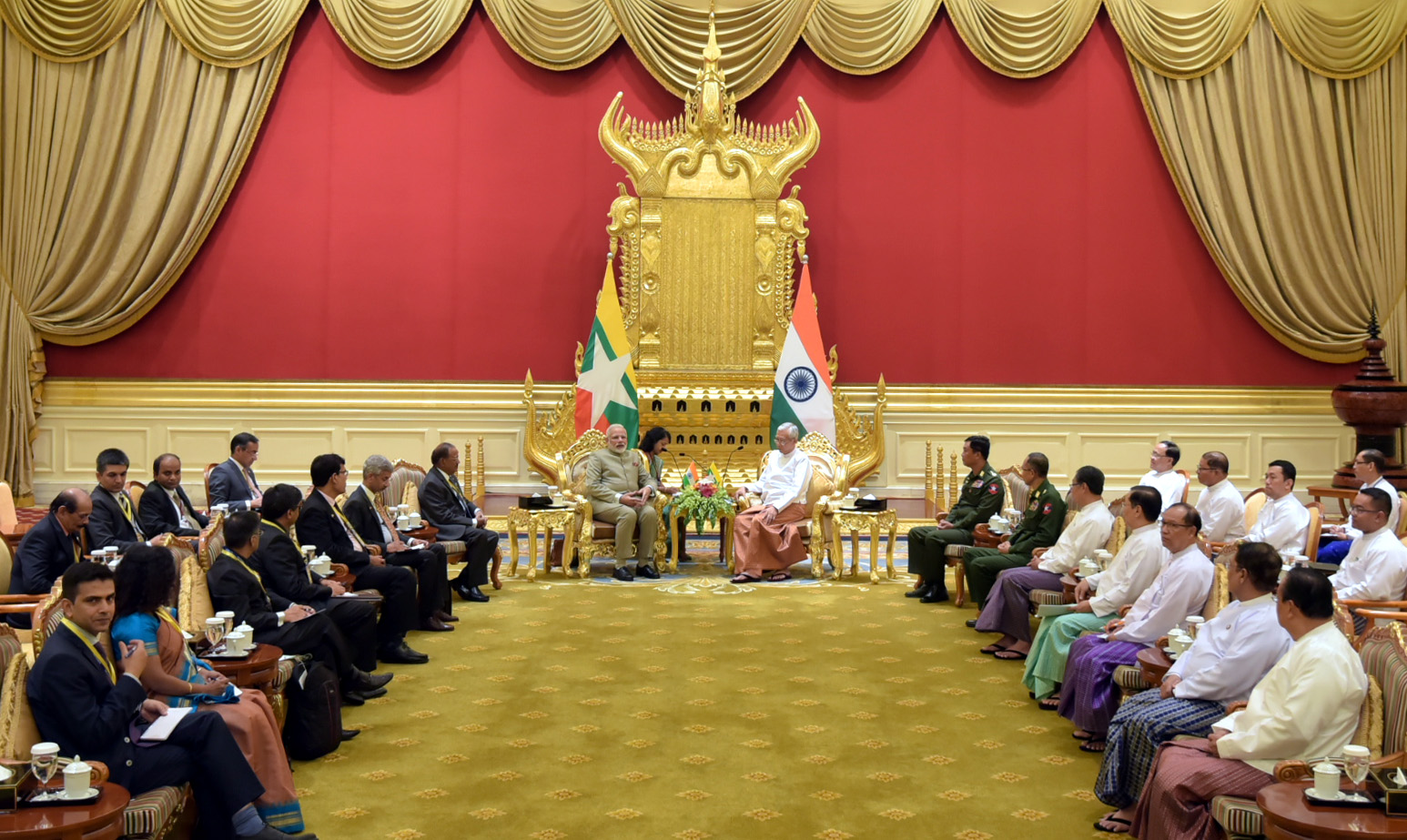
Presidential Palace, during the meeting between President of Myanmar U. Htin Kyaw and Prime Minister of India Narendra Modi.

Union Parliament

The city's Ministry zone contains the headquarters of Myanmar's government ministries. All the ministry buildings are identical in appearance. A parliamentary complex consisting of 31 buildings and a 100-room presidential palace are also located there. Presidential Palace, Parliament and the city hall building were built with Stalinist architecture, but with a Burmese-style roof.

=== Military zone ===
High-ranking military officers and other key officials live eleven kilometres (6.8 mi) away from regular government employees in a complex said to consist of tunnels and bunkers; this area is restricted to the public. The city also hosts a military base, which is inaccessible to citizens or other personnel without written permission.

=== Diplomatic zone ===
The government has set aside two hectares (4.9 acres) of land each for foreign embassies and headquarters of United Nations missions. The Chinese embassy formally opened its interim liaison office in 2017. The liaison office is the first foreign office to be permitted to open in Naypyidaw. Bangladesh and Malaysia have also signed agreements to open embassies in Naypyidaw. The government confirms that proposals have been put forward by 11 other countries to move their embassies to Naypyidaw, namely Russia, China, the United States, India, Saudi Arabia, Qatar, the Philippines, Indonesia, Thailand, Turkey and Kuwait. In February 2018, State Counsellor Daw Aung San Suu Kyi chaired a meeting at the Ministry of Foreign Affairs in Naypyidaw where she urged foreign governments to move their embassies to the capital.

Wunna Theikdi Indoor Stadium

=== Hotel zone ===
The Hotel zone has a handful of villa-style hotels on the hilly outskirts of the city. There are twelve hotels located in or near Naypyidaw. Eight of these are located within the Naypyidaw Hotel Zone, and two are located in Laeway (Lewe) on the Yangon-Mandalay Road. Forty villas were constructed near the Myanmar Convention Centre in preparation for the 25th ASEAN summit conducted in Naypyidaw in November 2014. Construction of the villas began in 2010 by the government. However, funds were limited, so the project was later put out to tender for completion by private sector investors. A total of 348 hotels and 442 inns were constructed to house the athletes and spectators of the 2013 Southeast Asian Games, which was hosted in Naypyidaw.

=== Market areas ===
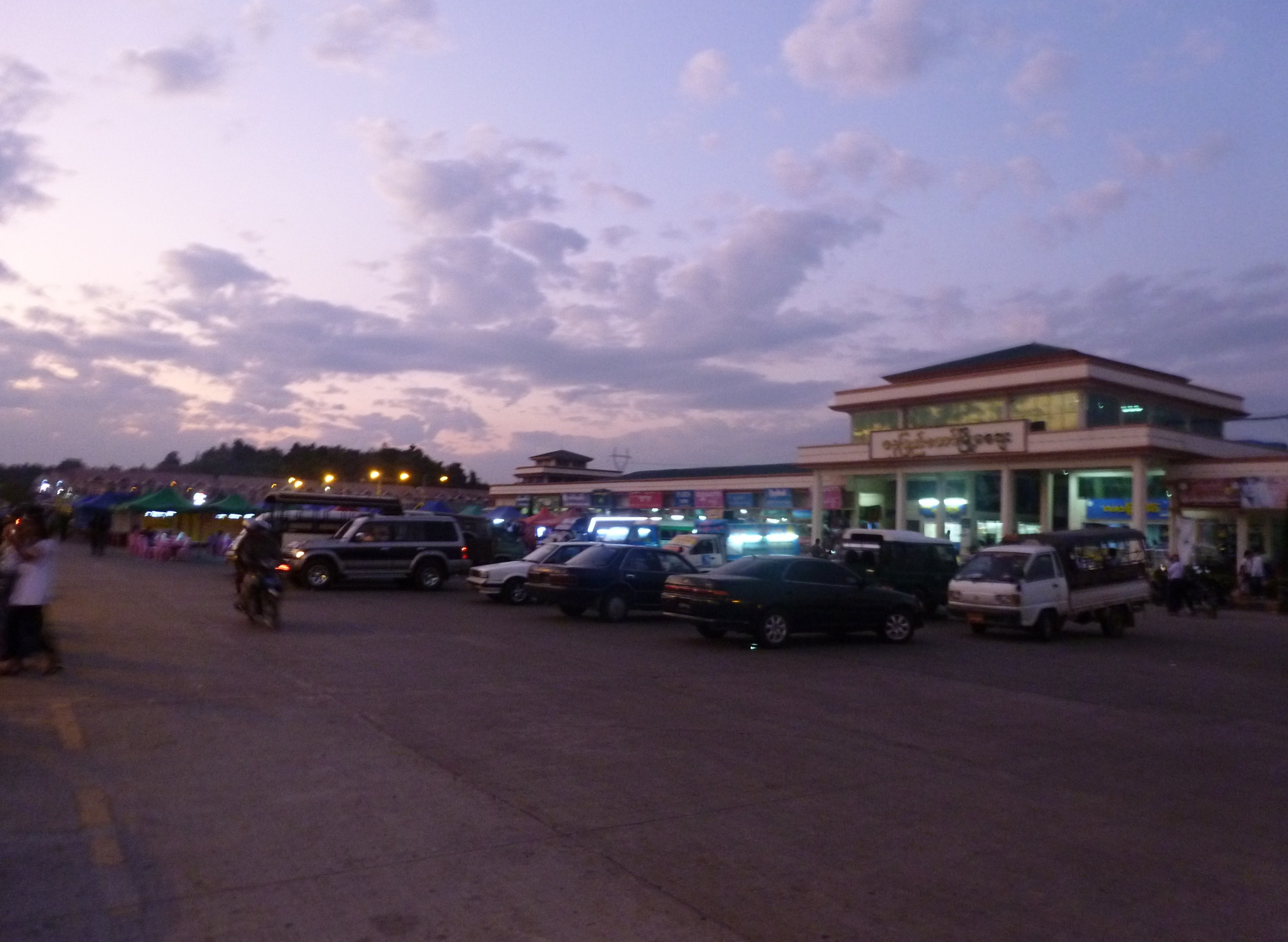
Myoma Market

Naypyidaw Myoma Market is the commercial centre of Naypyidaw. Other shopping areas include Thapye Chaung Market, Junction Centre Naypyidaw and Naypyidaw Wholesale. Junction Centre is the city's first privately operated shopping centre. There are also local markets and a restaurant area.

=== Recreation ===
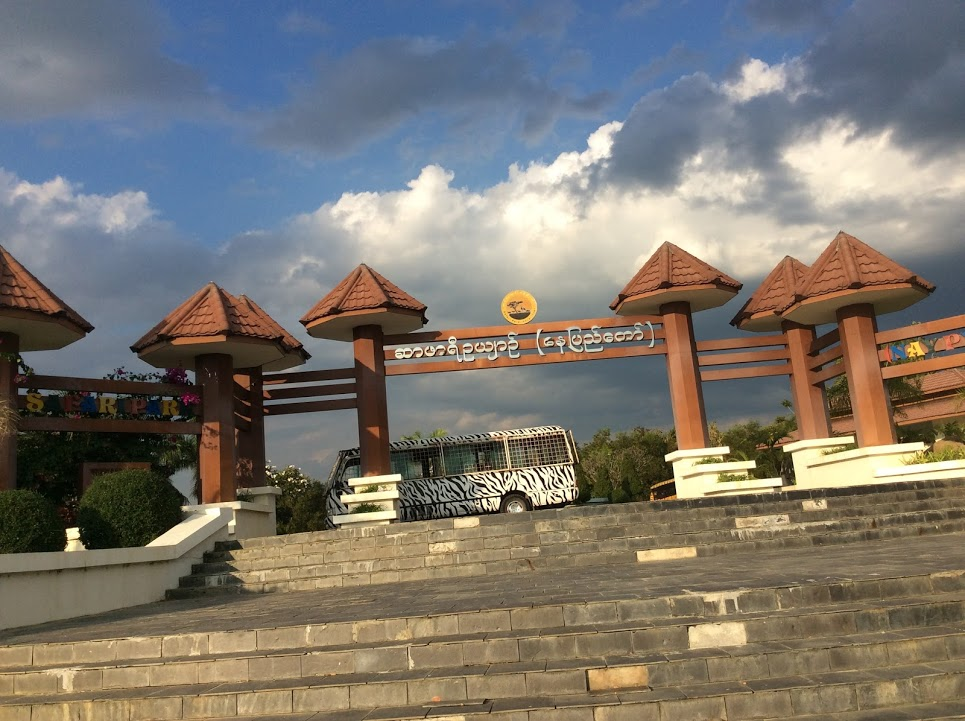
Safari Park

Ngalaik Lake Gardens is a small water park situated along the Ngalaik Dam, near Kyweshin Village on Ngalaik Lake (about 11 kilometres (7 mi) from Naypyidaw). Opened in 2008, facilities at the Ngalaik Lake Gardens include water slides, natural resorts, lodging and a beach. The gardens are open to the public during Thingyan holidays.

Also opened in 2008, the 81-hectare (200-acre) National Herbal Park has exhibits of plants having medicinal applications from all of the major regions of Myanmar. There are thousands of plants at the park, representing hundreds of different species. Behind the city hall, there is a park with a playground and water fountain complex, which hosts a musical light show every night.

The Naypyidaw Zoological Gardens opened in 2008 with 420 species and now with 1500 animals. The main attraction of the zoo is the climate-controlled penguin house. The animals were shipped to it from the old one in Yangon. The Naypyidaw Safari Park officially opened on 12 February 2011.

Naypyidaw also has two golf courses, Naypyidaw City Golf Course and Yaypyar Golf Course, and a gem museum.

=== Landmark ===
Similar in size and shape to the Shwedagon Pagoda in Yangon, Uppatasanti Pagoda was completed in 2009. This new pagoda is named the Uppatasanti or "Peace Pagoda". The stake-driving ceremony for the pagoda was held on 12 November 2006. The invitation card for the ceremony opened with a phrase "Rajahtani Naypyidaw (the royal capital where the king resides)". The pagoda is just 30 centimetres (12 in) shorter than the Shwedagon Pagoda. Uppatasanti translates roughly to "Protection against Calamity". It is the name of a sūtra prepared by a monk in the early 16th century. It is to be recited in time of crisis, especially in the face of foreign invasion.

== Administration ==
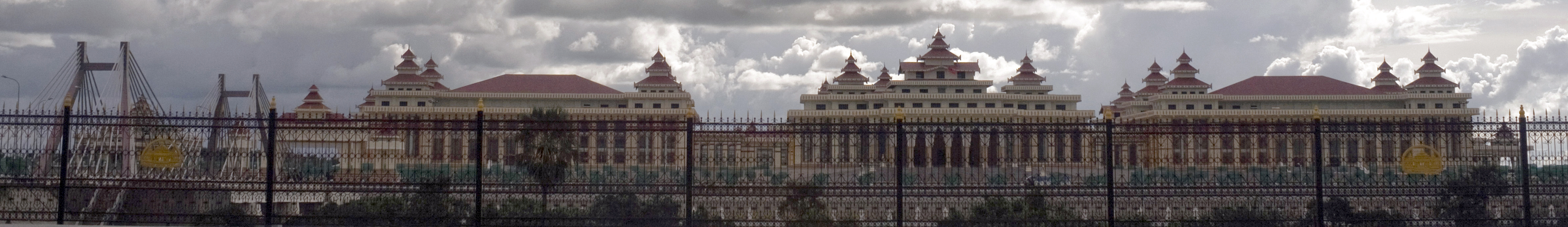
Pyidaungsu Hluttaw Complex (Parliament)

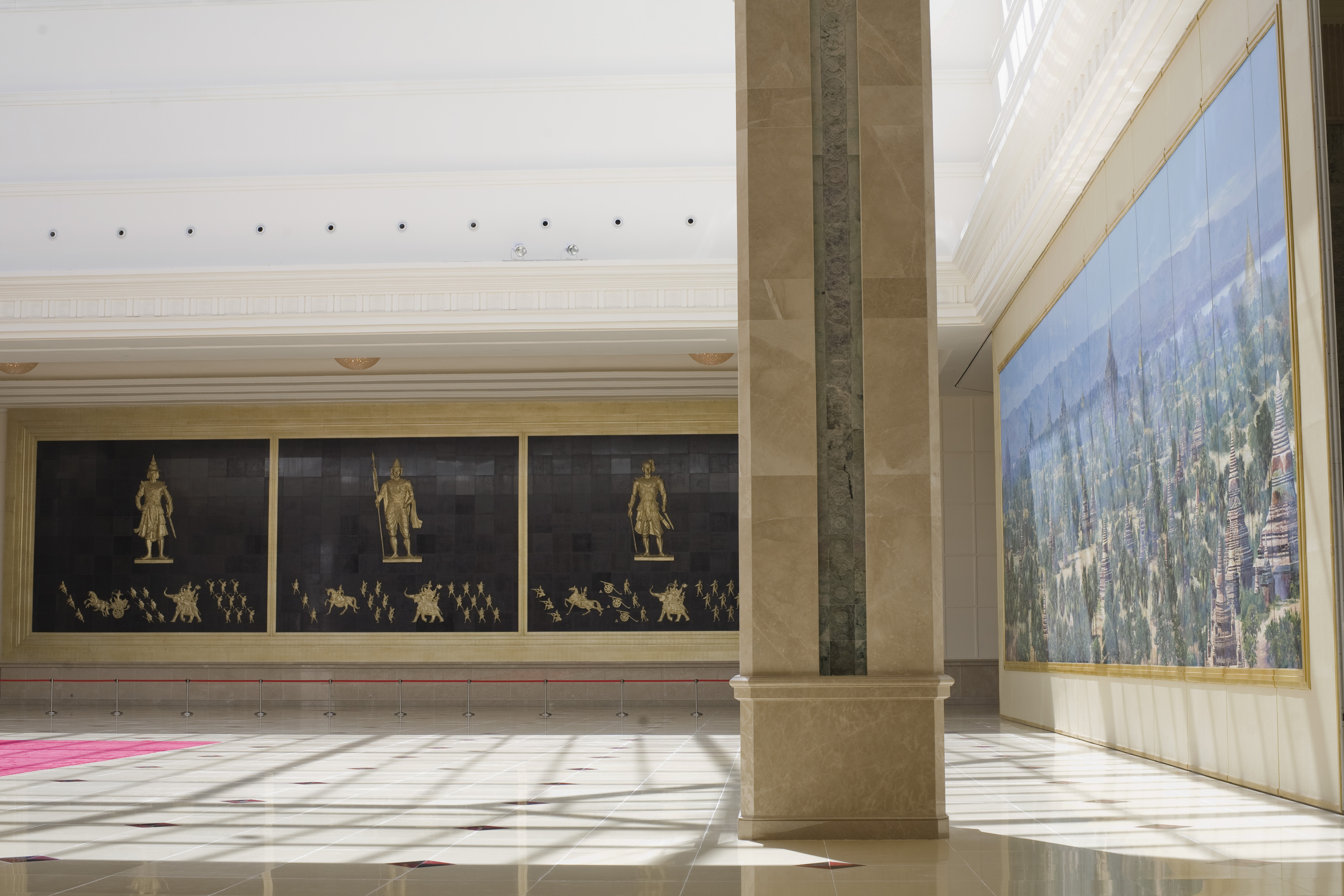
Lobby of Zeyathiri Beikman, the government guesthouse for high level delegations

The Naypyidaw Union Territory is administered at both the State/Region level, and as a municipality at the local level under two different governing bodies. Naypyidaw is one of three cities in the country to have municipal governance, the others being Yangon and Mandalay.

Naypyidaw Council (NPTC) is the regional administrative body of the territory, and is under the direct supervision of the President of Myanmar. The council is appointed by the President, and must have no less than 5 and no more than 10 members and include both civilians and military personnel. The Chairperson becomes the ex-officio Mayor, and the Head of the General Administration Department (GAD) of the territory becomes the Secretary of the council. Matters under the jurisdiction of the Council include: general planning, coordination of internal security, nature conservation, emergency management, oversight of civil service organisations within the territory, and any other duties assigned to it by the constitution or law.

Naypyidaw Development Committee (NPTDC) is the local government body of the territory. The committee is appointed by the President, and must have at least 5 members, but no more than 9. The Chairperson of the Committee becomes the Mayor of Naypyidaw, the vice-chairman becomes the Vice-Mayor, and the Head of Office becomes the Joint Secretary of the committee. Because both laws make the chair of the Council and Committee the mayor, the same person holds both offices. Matters under the jurisdiction of the Committee include: urban planning, land-use planning, planning permission, traffic management, various public works (sewage treatment, water supply, sanitation, roads, bridges, drainage, etc.), and other local competencies. Unlike the NPTC which must request funding for its budget from the Union government, the committee is permitted to levy taxes to fund its work.

The current mayor is Dr. Maung Maung Naing, appointed as the Chair of Naypyidaw Council on 2 February 2021. Dr. Myo Aung of the National League for Democracy party served as Mayor from his appointment on 1 April 2016, until his arrest on 1 February 2021, during the 2021 Myanmar coup d'état.

=== Administrative divisions ===
Naypyidaw Union Territory consists of 2 districts subdivided into 8 townships. Pyinmana, Lewe, and Tatkone townships were all formerly part of Yamethin District in Mandalay Region. Ottarathiri, Dekkhinathiri, Popphathiri, Zabuthiri, and Zeyathiri are all new townships under construction. Like the townships in the rest of the country, they are governed by a development affairs organisation (DAO) which includes a Township Administrator appointed by the General Administration Department, and an elected Township Development Affairs Committee (TDAC).

- Ottara District
  - Ottarathiri Township (ဥတ္တရသီရိ မြို့နယ်, from Pali uttarasiri)
  - Pobbathiri Township (ပုဗ္ဗသီရိ မြို့နယ်, from Pali pupphasiri)
  - Tatkone
  - Zeyarthiri Township (ဇေယျာသီရိ မြို့နယ်, from Pali jayasiri)
- Dekkhina District
  - Dekkhinathiri Township (ဒက္ခိဏသီရိ မြို့နယ်, from Pali dakkhiṇasiri)
  - Lewe Township
  - Pyinmana Township
  - Zabuthiri Township (ဇမ္ဗူသီရိ မြို့နယ်, from Pali jambusiri)

There is sometimes some controversy about land use and changes in land ownership related to the urban spread of Naypyidaw. In late 2014, for example, there were suggestions in parliament that land grabs were occurring near the Dekkhinathiri Township and that existing laws needed to be amended to provide better protection for farmers. There has also been criticism from some members of parliament about the size of the Naypyidaw Union Territory and the fact that money is being spent on urban infrastructure (such as lighting around lakes) although the facilities do not attract much use.

== Transport ==
=== Roads ===
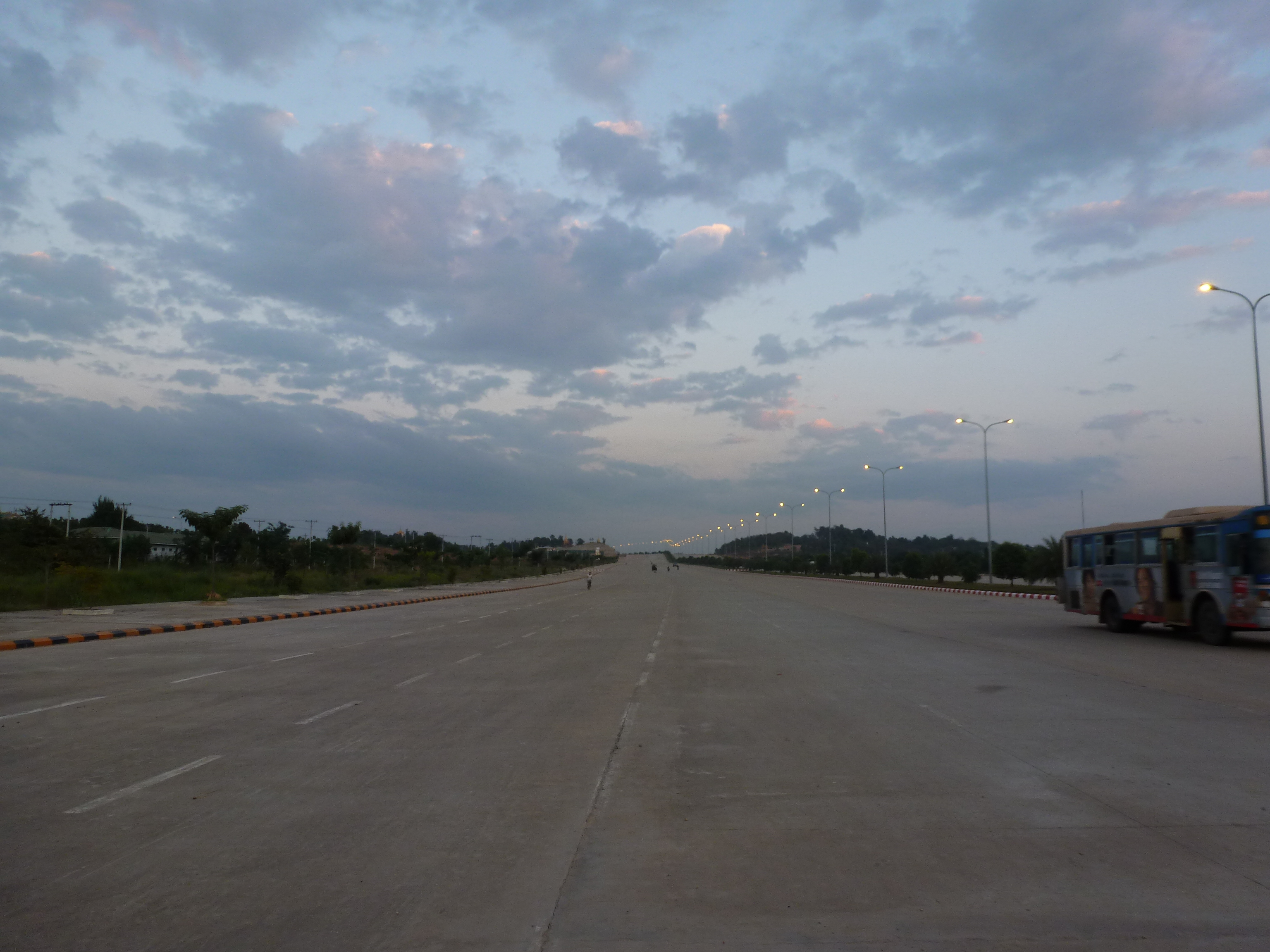
An empty boulevard in Naypyidaw

The four-lane, 323.2-kilometre (200.8 mi) Yangon-Naypyidaw highway links Naypyidaw with Yangon directly and is part of the 563-kilometre-long (350 mi) Yangon-Naypyidaw-Mandalay Expressway. There is a 20-lane boulevard. Like most roads in the city, it is largely empty. Naypyidaw has four-lane roads and multilevel, flower-covered roundabouts (traffic circles).

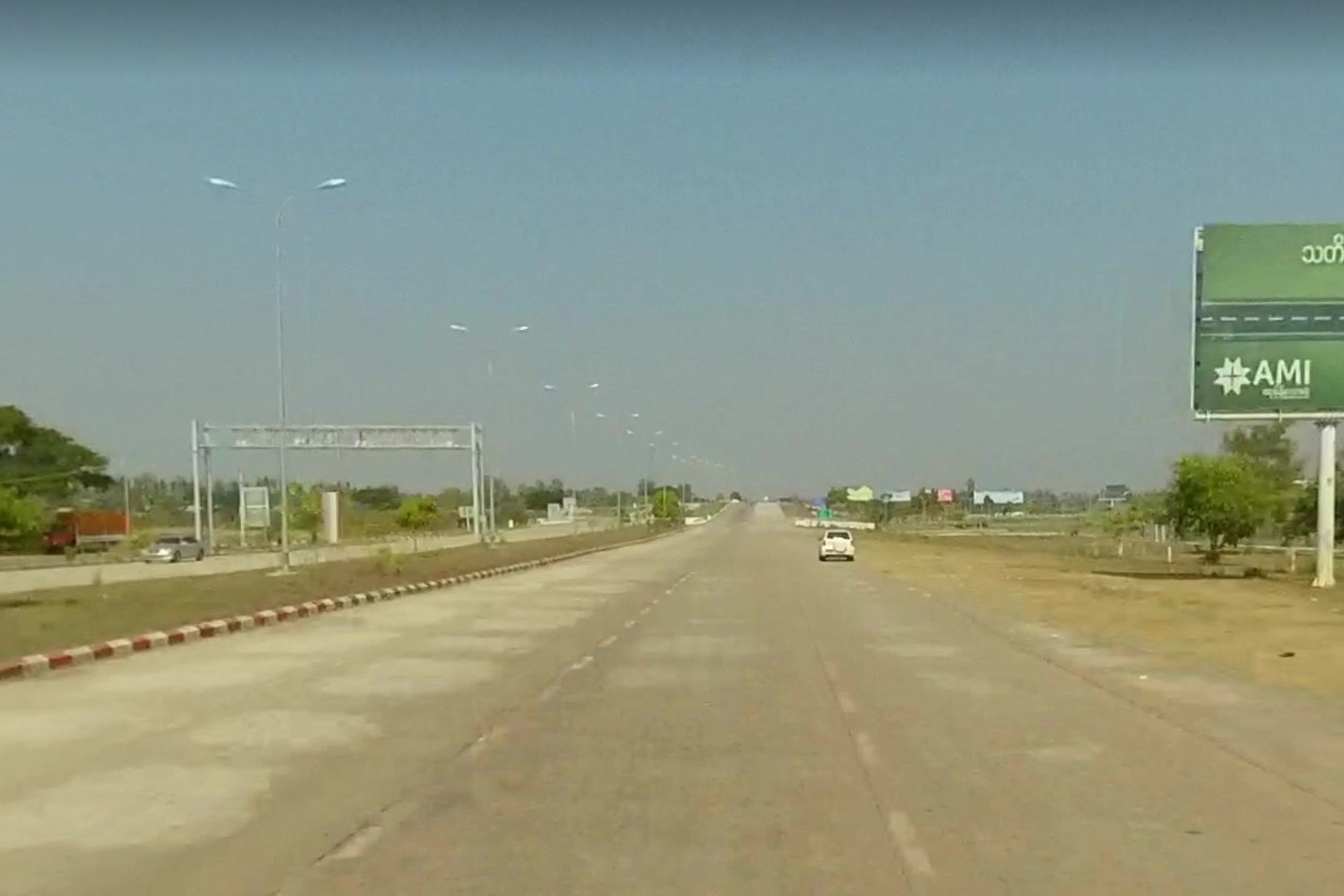
Yangon-Mandalay Expressway (Near Ywathit, Naypyidaw.)

=== Air ===
Naypyidaw International Airport

Nay Pyi Taw International Airport, also known as Ayelar Airport, opened in December 2011 and is 16 kilometres (9.9 mi) south-east of the city, between the towns of Ela and Lewe. It has been served by all domestic airlines—Air Bagan, Air Mandalay, Myanmar National Airlines, FMI Air and Yangon Airways—with regular flights to Yangon and other cities across the country. According to the Transport Ministry, the airport has a 3.6-kilometre (2.2 mi) long runway, a control tower 69 metres (226 ft) high and handle up to 65,000 flights annually. Airlines from Thailand and China used to serve international flights in the past, but the airport now caters only to local destinations.

=== Buses and taxis ===
Public transport services are limited between neighbourhoods. Government ministries run shuttle buses in the morning and evening to their respective buildings.

The city has a central bus station and one taxi company, which is operated by the military. Motorbikes are banned from some roads in Naypyidaw city limits, including sections of Taw Win Yadana Road, as a result of hundreds of traffic accident-related deaths in 2009.

=== Railways ===
Naypyidaw Central Railway Station

Naypyidaw Central railway station was opened at milepost No. (233/0), between Ywataw station and Kyihtaunggan station on the Yangon–Mandalay Railway with a station area of 2,700 m × 1,200 m (9,000 ft × 4,000 ft) and a covered area of 334.5 hectares (826.5 acres). Construction began on 8 December 2006 and Naypyidaw railway station was opened on 5 July 2009, even though the overpass, locomotive shed, concrete road leading up to the station, parking lot, passenger lounge and platform were not completed.

Before the opening of Naypyidaw railway station, Naypyidaw was served by Pyinmana and Lewe stations, though only Pyinmana station is on the main rail line (which extends from Yangon-Bago-Naypyidaw-Thazi-Mandalay). Lewe station is on the way from Pyinmana to Kyaukpadaung. It takes nine hours by train to get from Yangon to Pyinmana; trains leave at 12:00 and arrive at 21:30 local time.

In August 2011, Russian news media announced that a Russian-based firm would be constructing a 50-kilometre (31 mi) metro line, which would be the country's first underground rail system, underneath Naypyidaw. However, the Rail Transportation Ministry then announced that the plan had been cancelled due to lack of demand and budgetary limits.

== Education and research ==
=== Higher education ===
Yezin (a few kilometers north-east of Naypyidaw and Pyinmana)

- Yezin University of Veterinary Science
- Yezin Agricultural University
- Yezin University of Forestry

Nay Pyi Taw

- University of Technology
- Naypyitaw State Academy

=== Research ===
- Forest Research Institute (FRI), Yezin
- Department of Agricultural Research (DAR), Yezin
- Southeast Asia Biodiversity Research Institute (SABRI)

== Healthcare ==
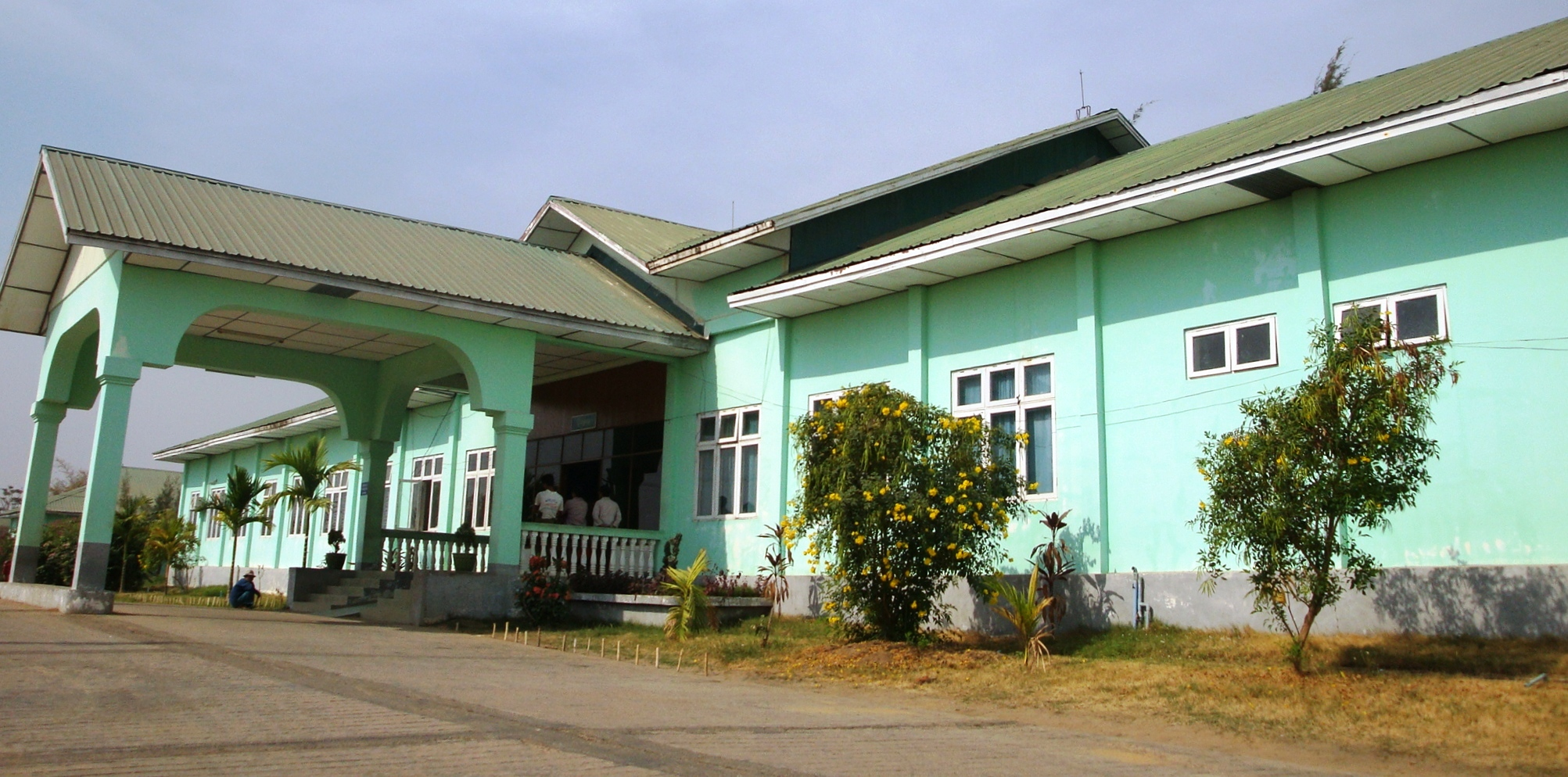
Naypyidaw General Hospital

The city is served by five public hospitals: 1000-bed Naypyidaw General Hospital, Naypyidaw Women Hospital, Naypyidaw ENT Hospital, 100-bed Naypyidaw Traditional Medicine Hospital, and Naypyidaw Orthopaedic Hospital. There is also a 300-bed Obstetric, Gynaecological and Children's Hospital of Defence Services, which is one of the teaching hospitals of Myanmar Defence Services Medical Academy. The nearby towns of Lewe, Pyinmana, and Tatkone each have one hospital.

== Sports ==
Myawady F.C., a Myanmar National League football club, is based at Wunna Theikdi Stadium in Naypyidaw.

== Main sights ==
=== Religious sites ===
- Uppatasanti Pagoda
- Maha Thetkya Yanthi Buddha
- Thatta Thattaha Maha Bawdi Pagoda (replica of Buddha Gaya)
- Maravijaya Buddha

=== Museums and memorials ===
Memorial to the Fallen Heroes

- Memorial to the Fallen Heroes
- National Museum
- Defence Services Museum
- Naypyidaw Gems Museum
- Planetarium
- The Museum of Sport

=== Recreation ===
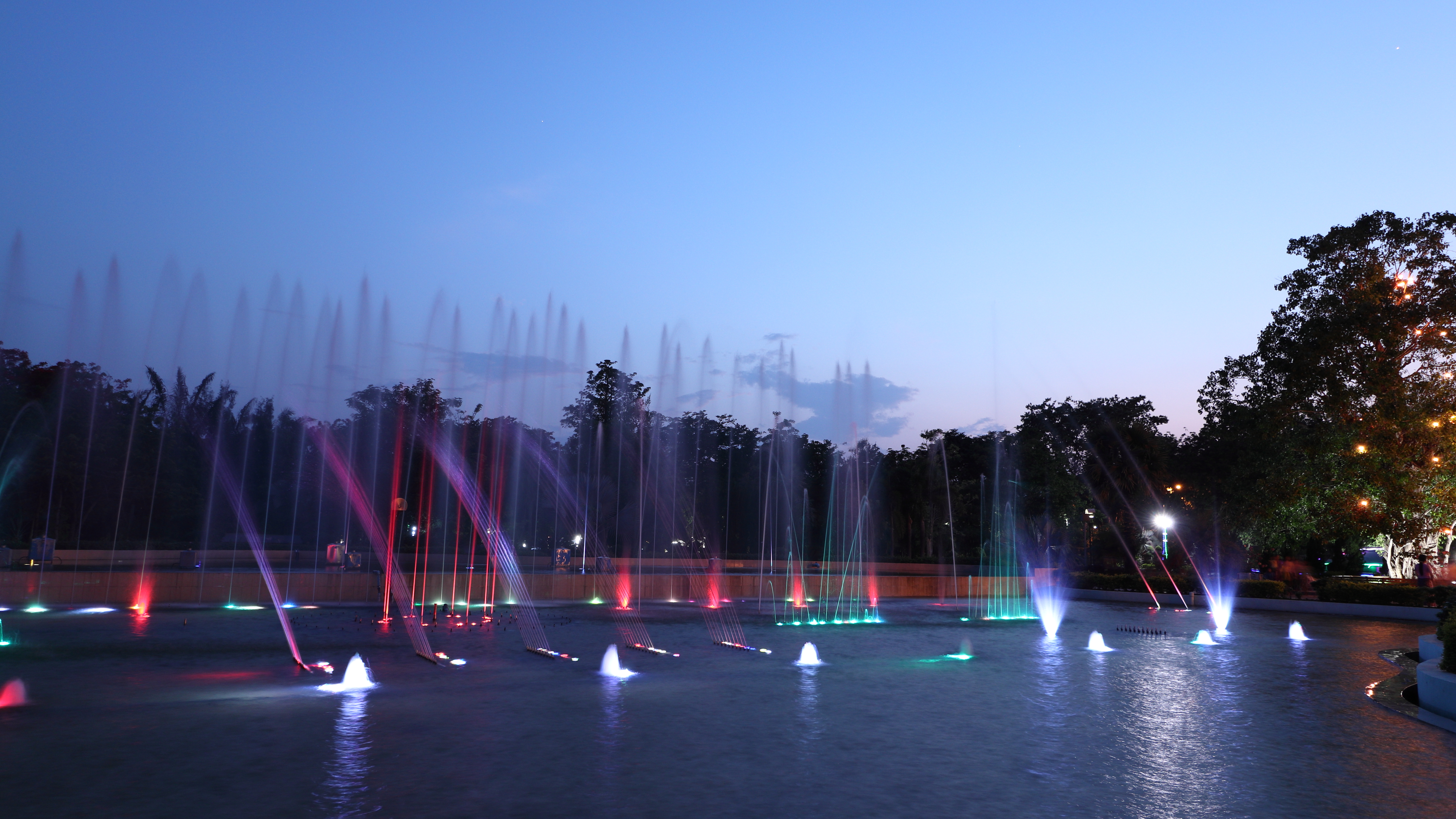
Naypyidaw Water Fountain Garden

- Naypyidaw Safari Park
- National Herbal Park
- Naypyidaw Zoological Gardens
- Naypyidaw Water Fountain Garden
- National Landmark Garden
- Naypyidaw Hot Spring Resort
- Wunna Theikdi Stadium
- Wunna Theikdi Indoor Stadium
- Zayarthiri Stadium

=== Concert halls and theatres ===
- Myanmar International Convention Centre 1 (MICC-1)
- Myanmar International Convention Centre 2 (MICC-2)
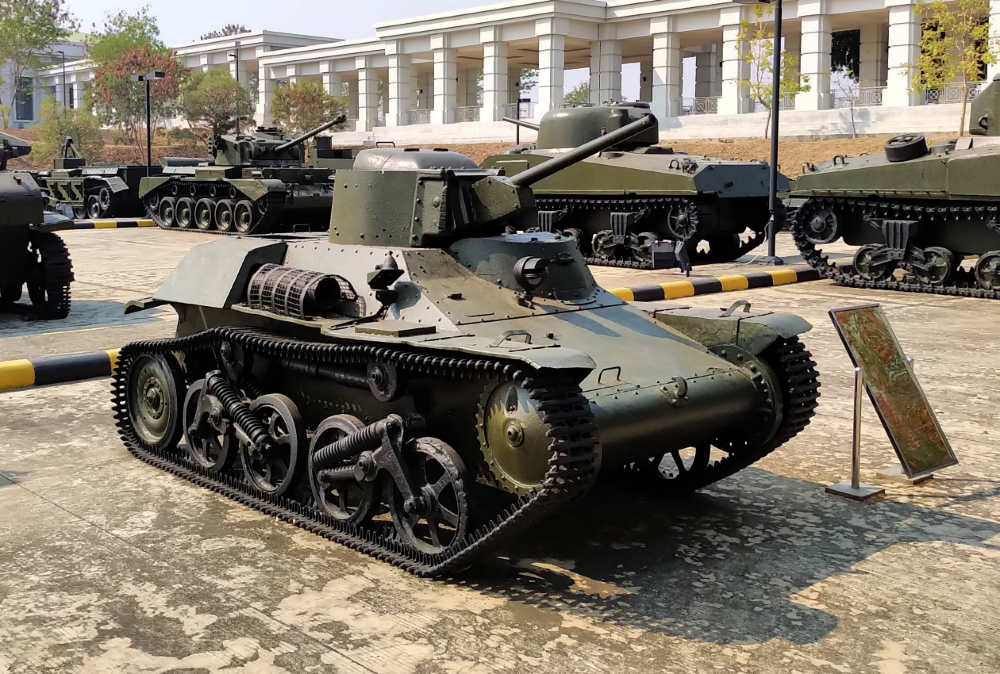
- Defence Services Museum
  Open-Air Theatre

== Arts and entertainment ==
The Myanmar Motion Picture Academy Awards are held annually in Naypyidaw given to the highest achievers in Burmese cinema. There is a movie theater in the Junction Centre Mall as well as in the Ocean Supercenter. There are two others in nearby Pyinmana, and one in Tatkone Township.

== Media and communications ==
The headquarters of the Ministry of Information is located in Naypyidaw. Since 2009, Naypyidaw has had mobile phone coverage.

=== Print ===
The Myanmar Alin and the Kyaymon in Burmese and the New Light of Myanmar in English are available in Naypyidaw. Since 18 November 2011, the Ministry of Information has begun publishing a weekly journal called the Naypyidaw Times, to report on government policies.

=== Radio ===
There are a number of AM and FM stations broadcasting in Naypyidaw. The main available channels in Naypyidaw are Myanmar Radio (operated by MRTV), Cherry FM, Mandalay FM, FM Bagan, Padamyar FM, Pyinsawaddy FM, Shwe FM and City FM.

=== Television ===
MRTV, MRTV-4 and MWD are the main channels, broadcasting Burmese-language programmes in Naypyidaw. Privately owned enterprise Sky Net provides more than 70 pay-TV channels of local and international origin. MRTV broadcasts 19 free-to-air channels and MWD broadcasts 8 free-to-air channels. Other TV channels such as Channel 7, 5-plus and Myanmar International, the English-language channel that targets overseas audiences are also available.

== Costs and issues ==
One estimate puts the cost in the range of $3–4 billion USD, although only part of this estimate is for cash spending because non-cash investments were also reportedly involved in supporting the construction effort.

There is now continual travel by vehicles along the 300 km (190 mi) highway from Yangon to Naypyidaw, which is four lanes for most of the way. There are relatively few vehicles for much of the time on the road. Most trucks travelling north from Yangon to Naypyidaw and Mandalay are prohibited from using the highway. The Asian Development Bank has estimated that allowing more trucks onto the road would save over $100 million per year in reduced travelling time and other savings. There are plans to turn the road into a six-lane highway for greater safety.

The proportion of housing that meets expatriate needs is limited because the majority of existing apartments are for government employees.

== In popular culture ==
In March 2014, Naypyidaw was one of the locations featured on the British motoring TV show Top Gear during a two-part special event in Myanmar.

In 2018, Naypyidaw was featured on the TV show Dark Tourist.

== Gallery ==
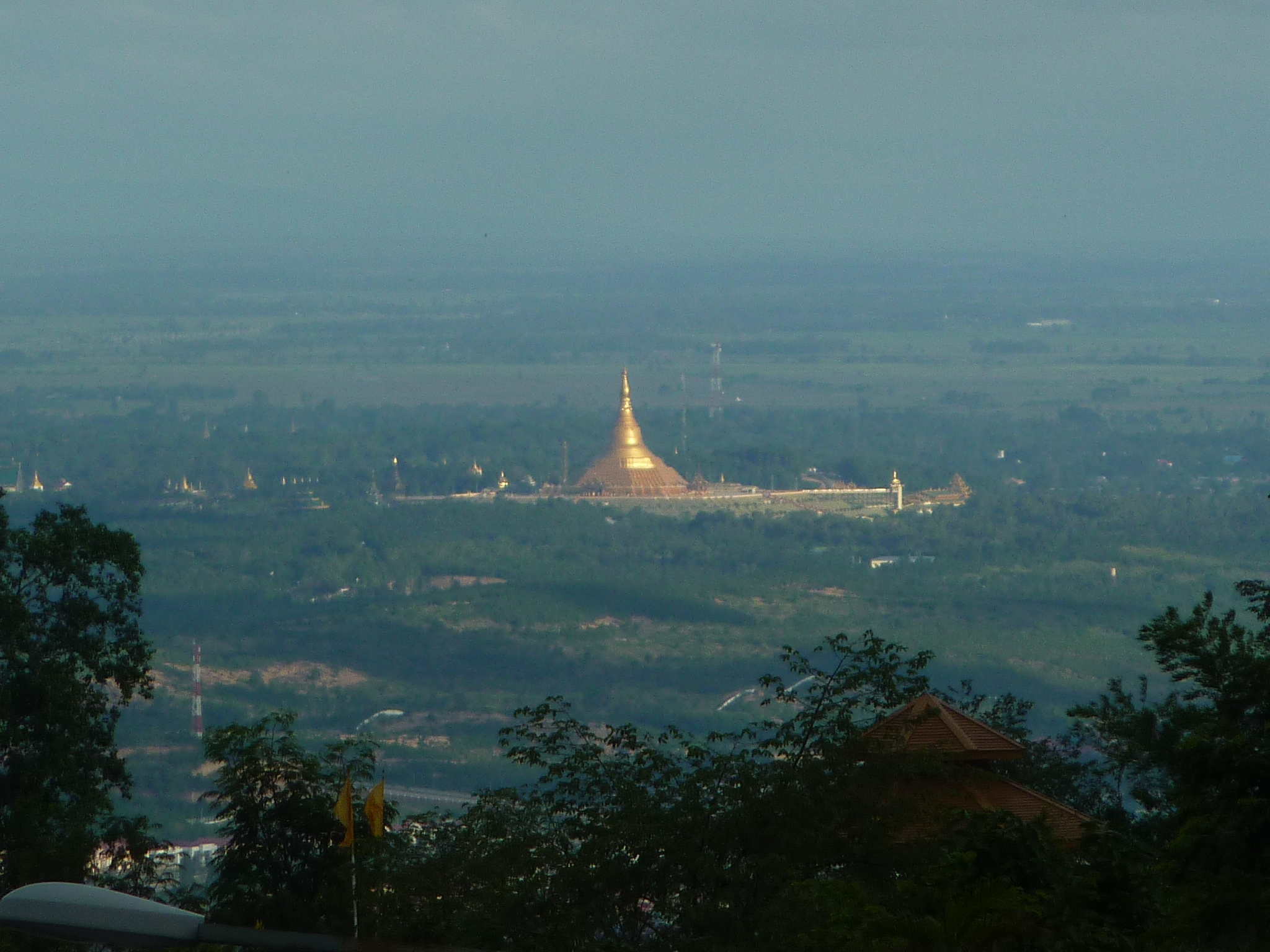
Uppatasanti Pagoda (western view)

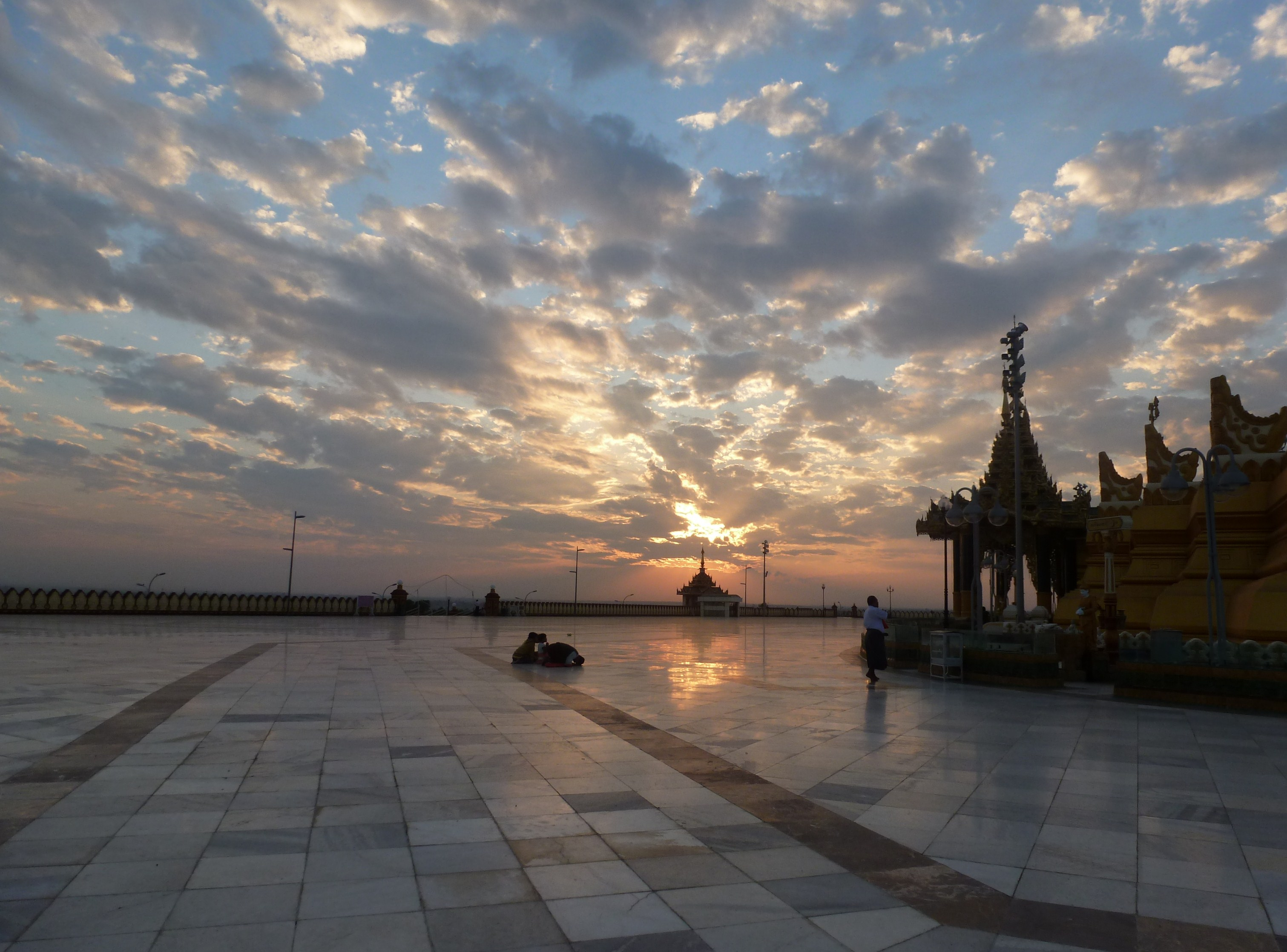
Uppatasanti Pagoda at sunset

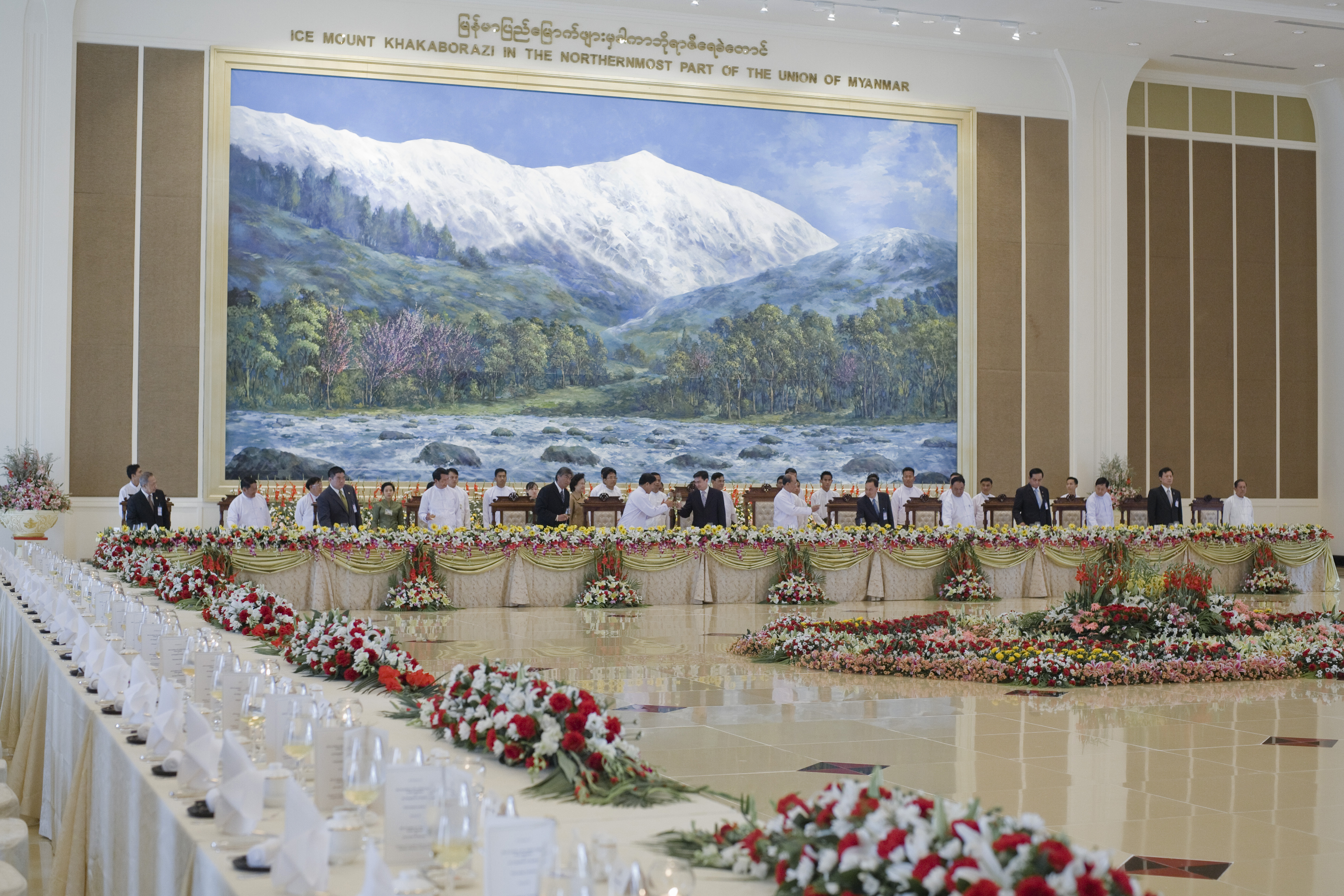
Government reception

Uppatasanti Pagoda interior

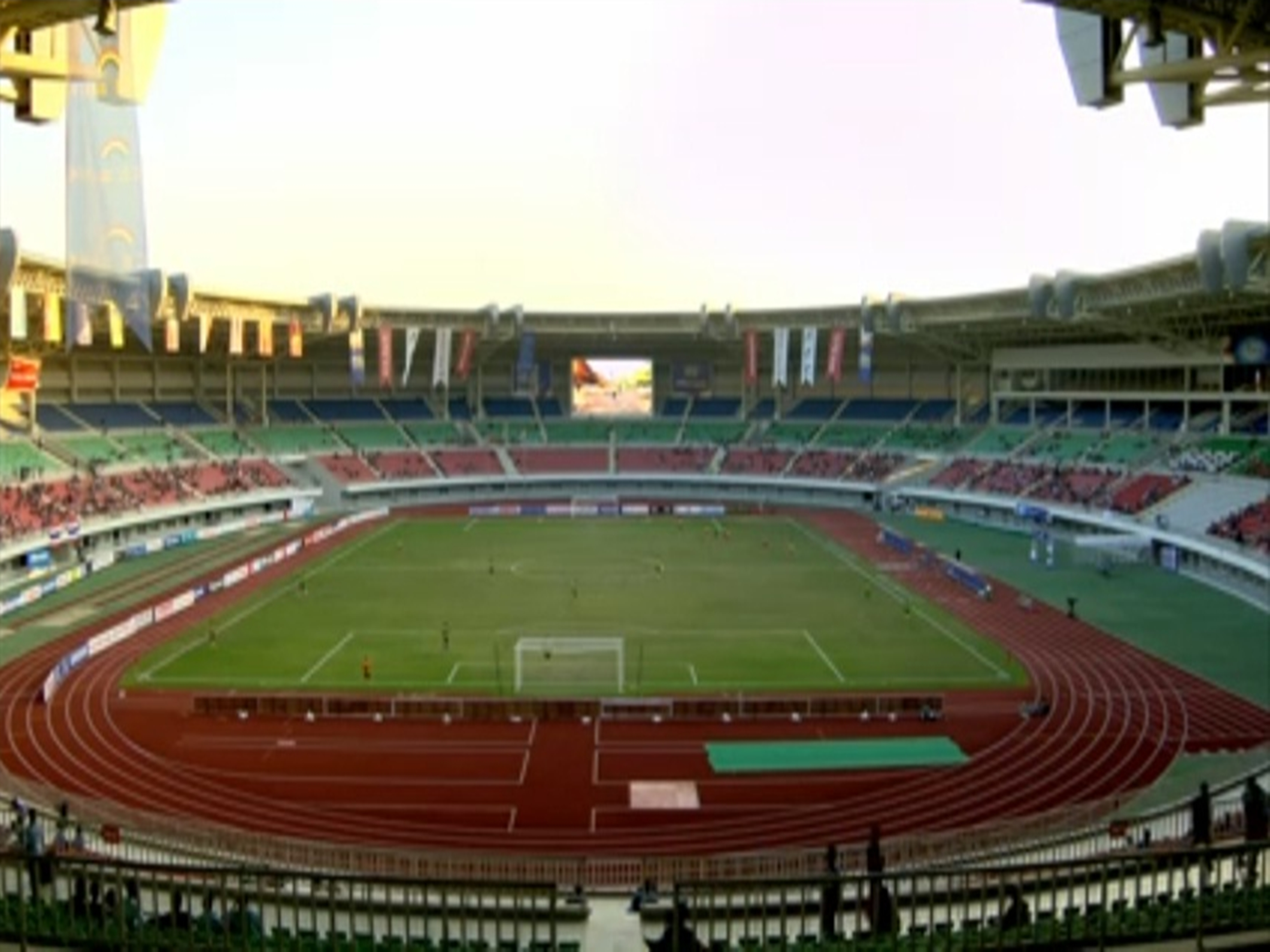
Zayyarthiri Stadium

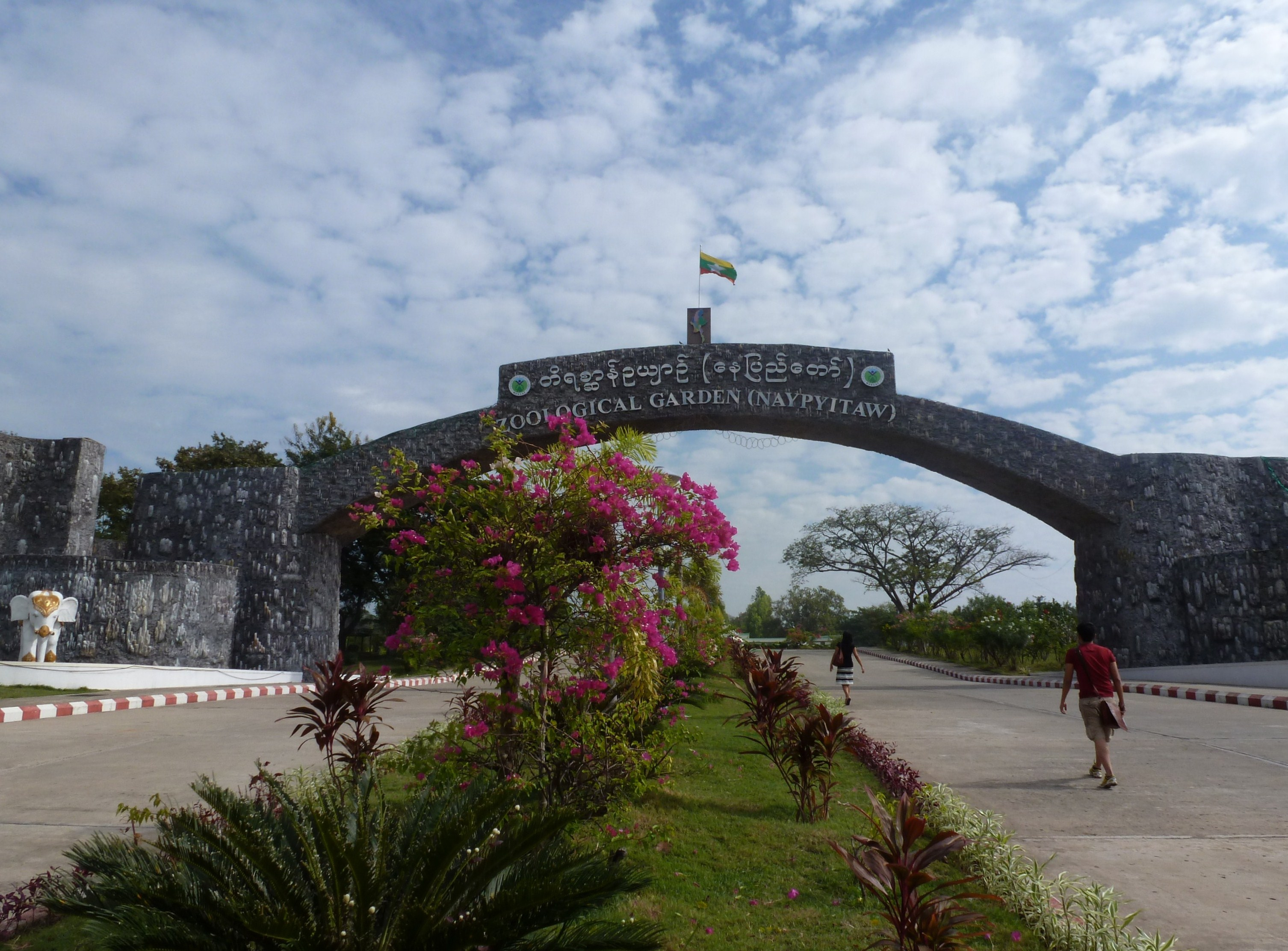
Nay Pyi Taw Zoo

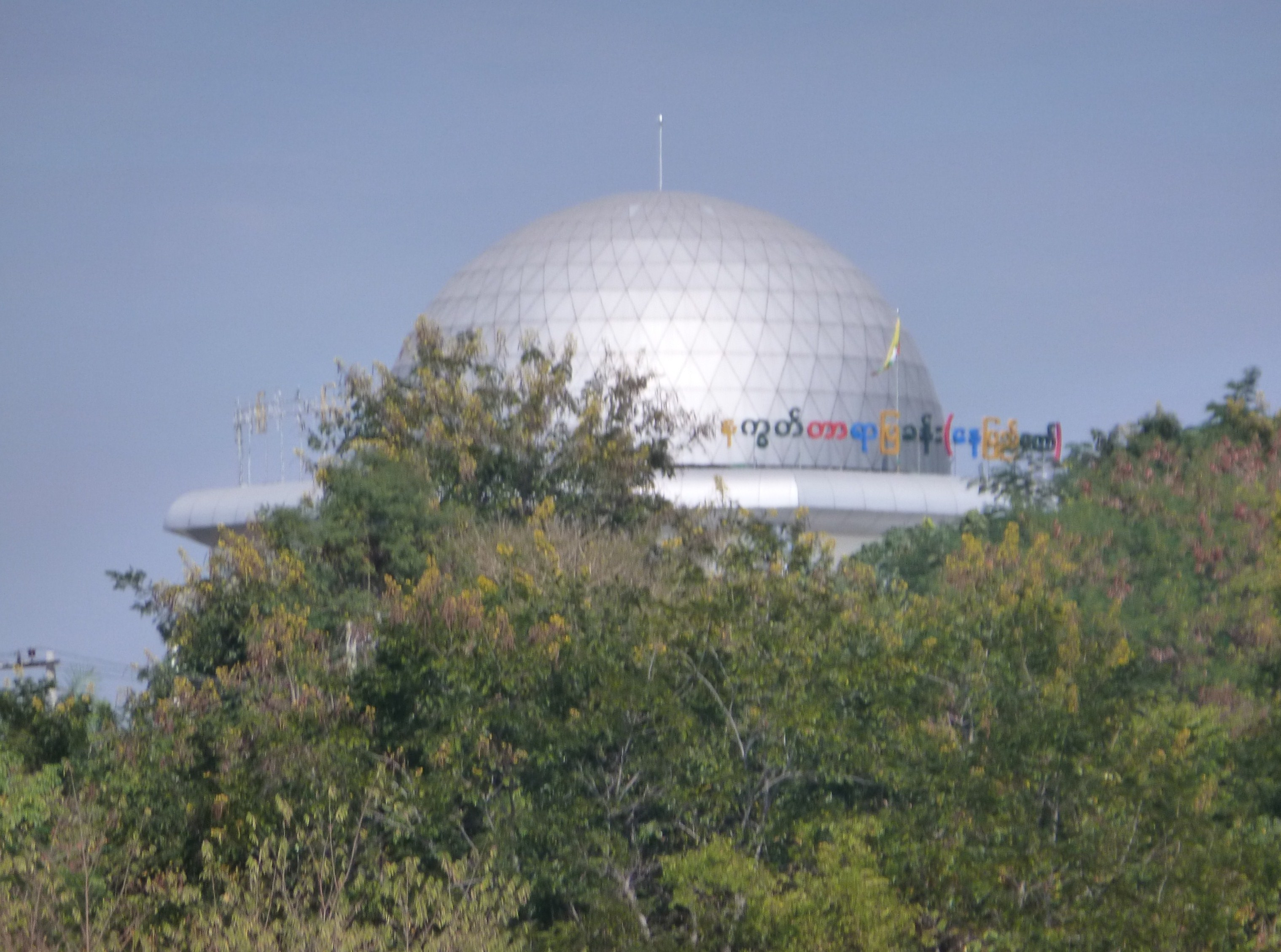
Planetarium

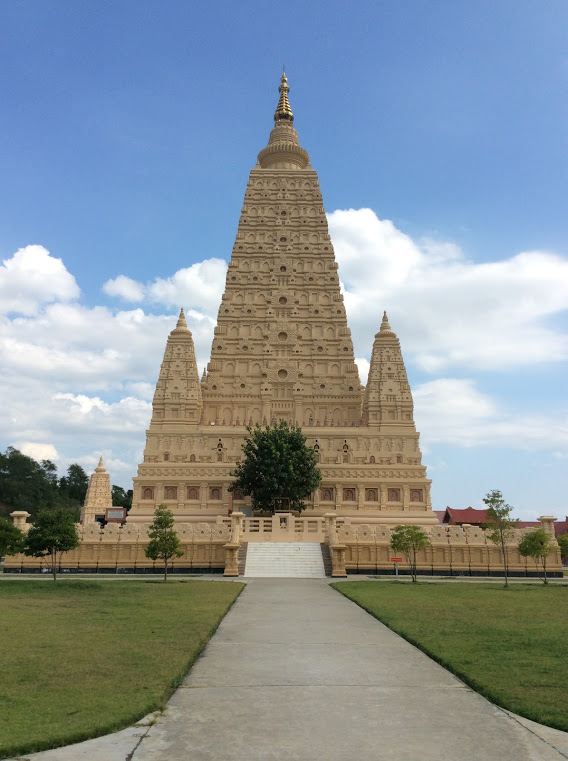
Thatta Thattaha Maha Bawdi Pagoda

Maha Thakya Yan Thi Pagoda

Naypyidaw Gems Museum

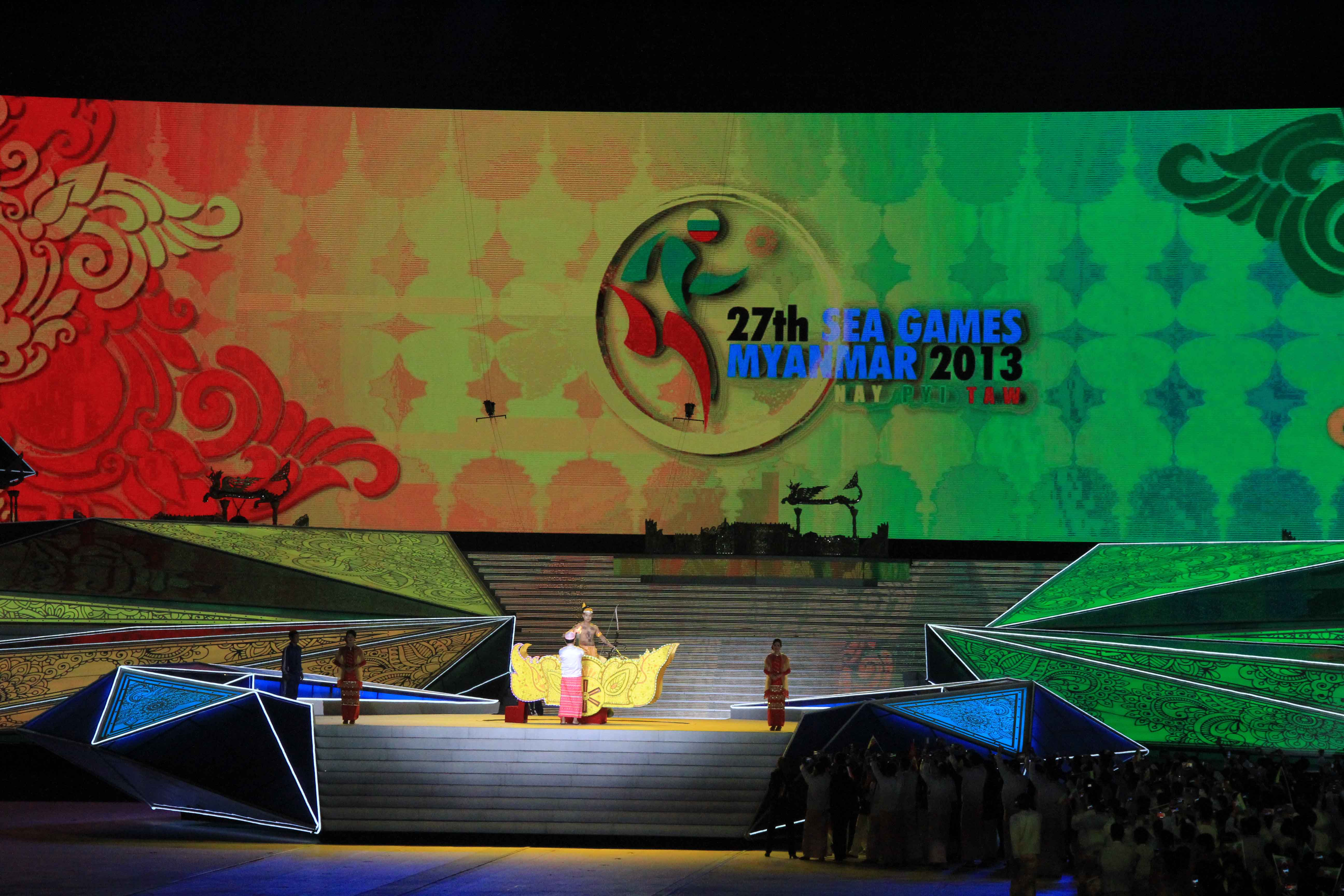
Naypyidaw hosting the 2013 Southeast Asian Games

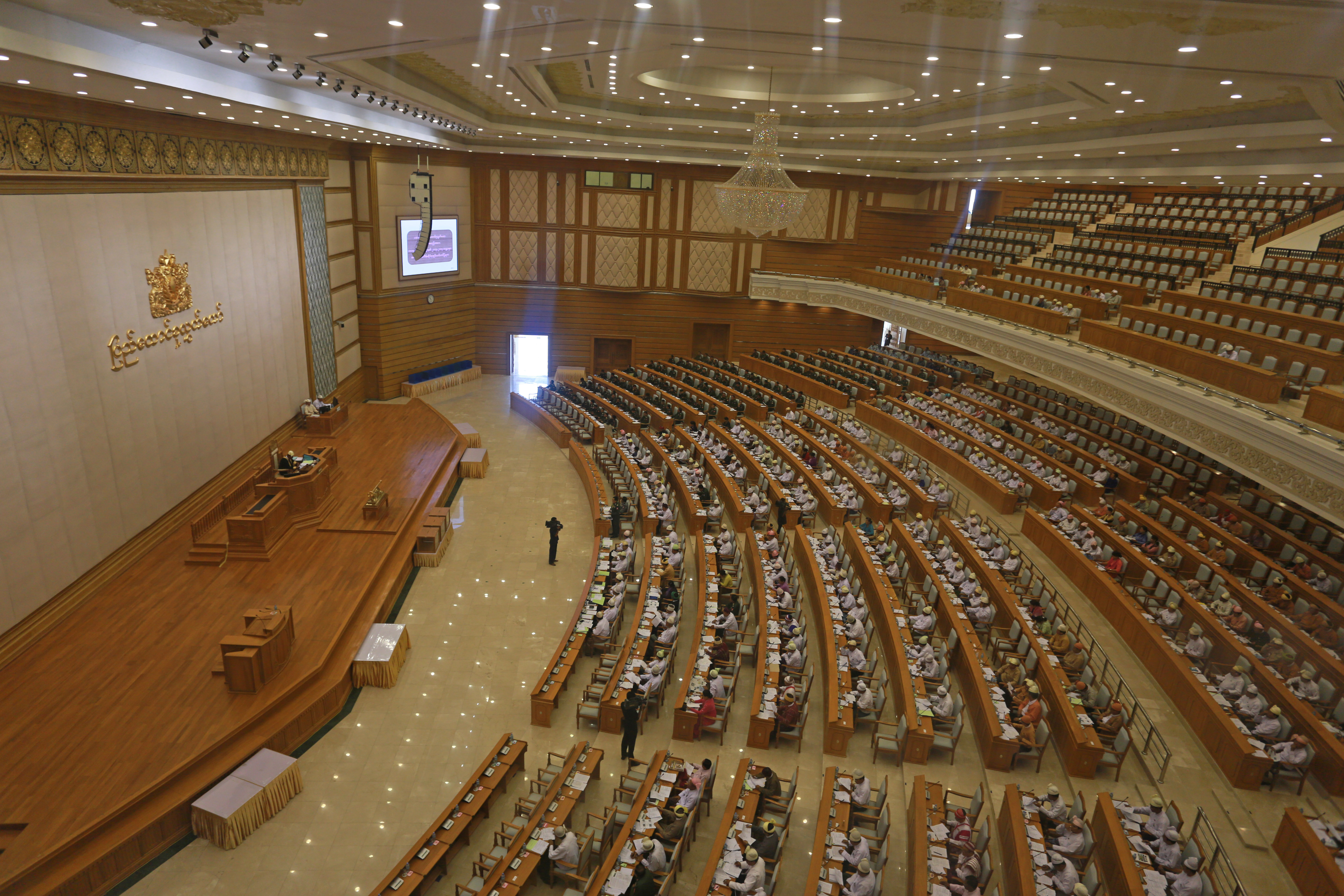
Union Parliament (Interior View)

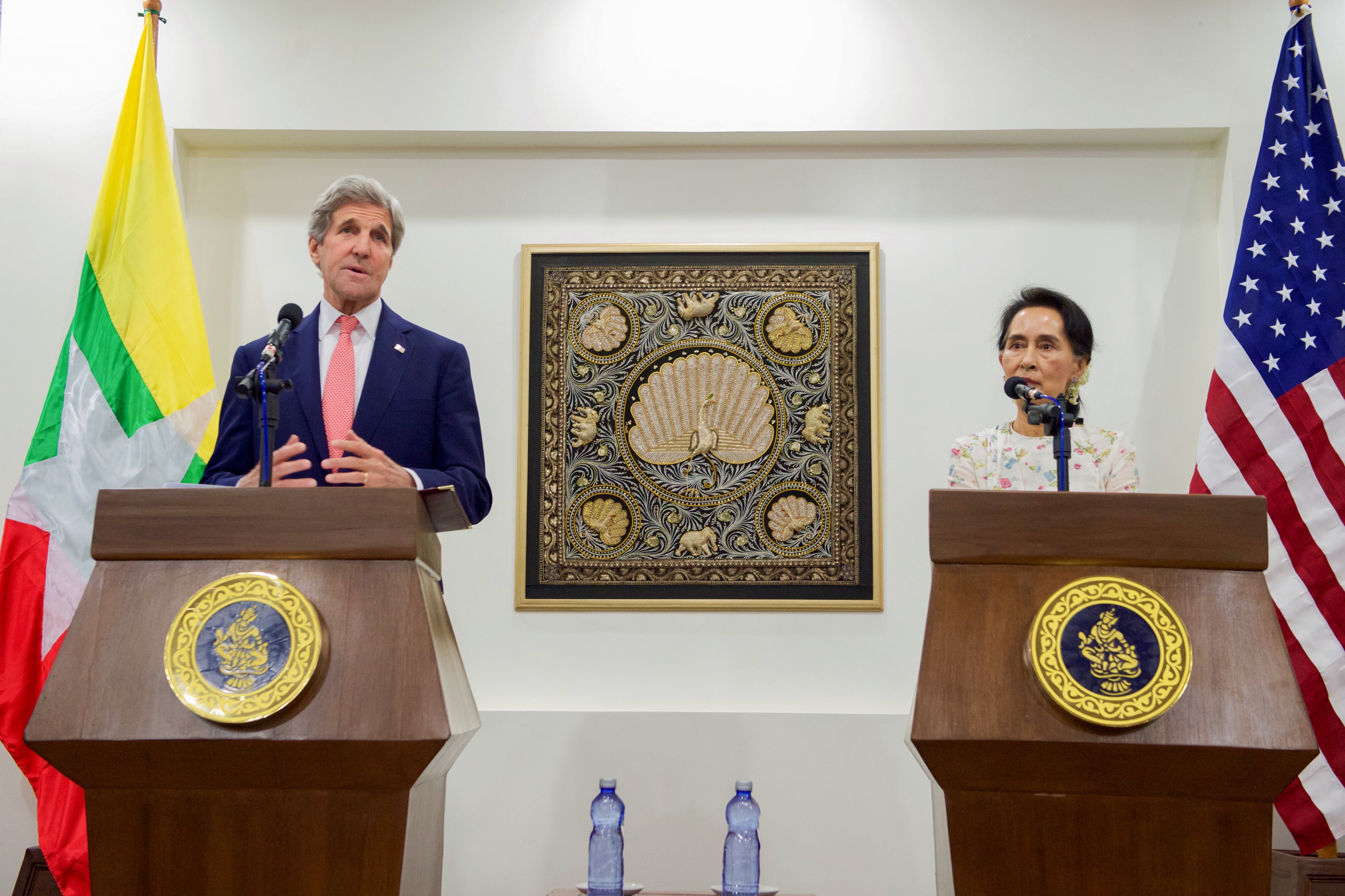
A press conference in Naypyidaw

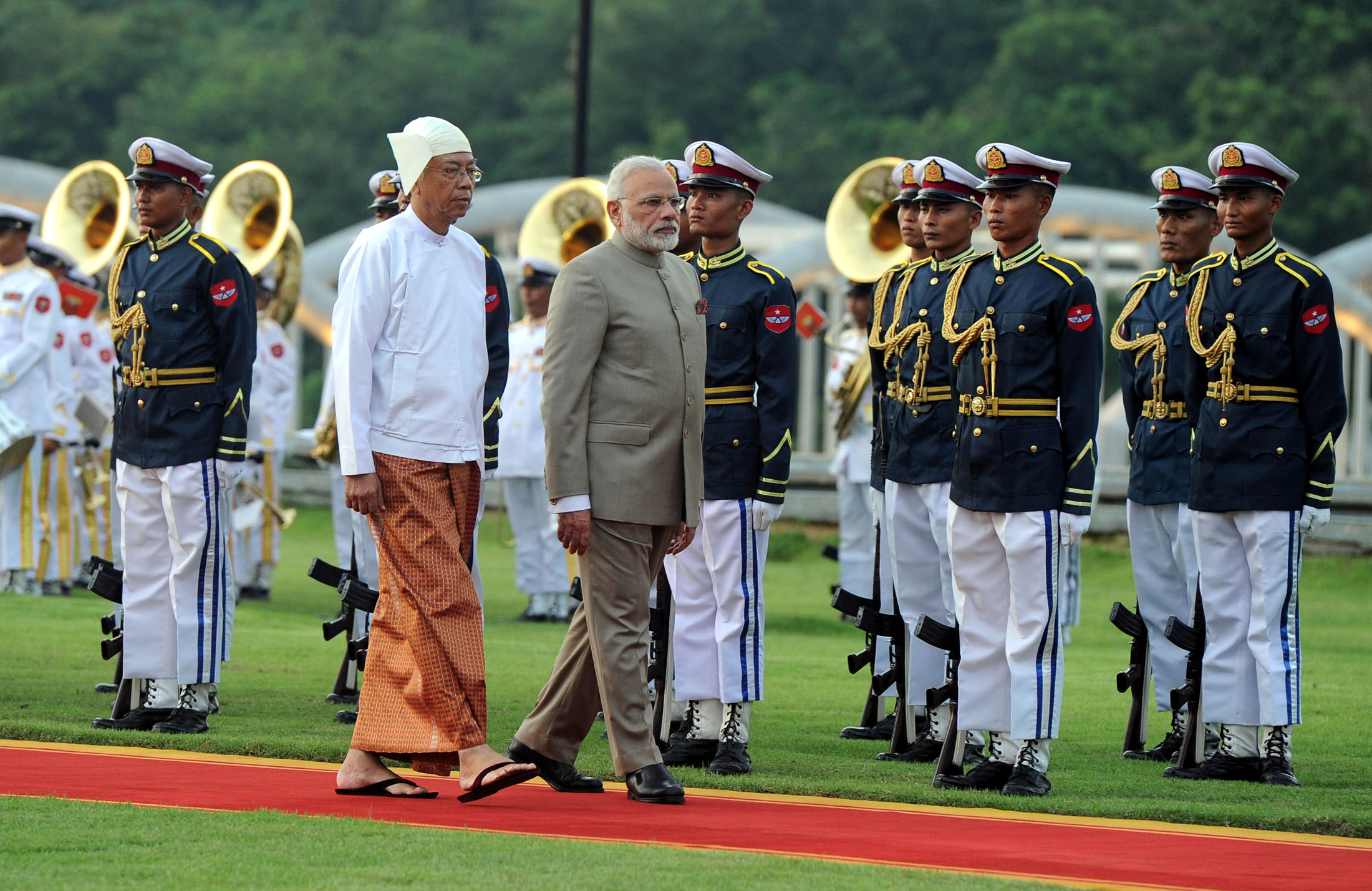
A ceremonial reception in Naypyidaw

== See also ==
- List of purpose-built national capitals
- List of capitals of Myanmar
- Naypyidaw Victoria rape case

== Notes ==
Naypyidaw
Preceded by Rangoon	Capital of Myanmar; 6 January 2005 – present	Succeeded by Current
Preceded by 2011 Palembang, Indonesia and Jakarta, Indonesia	Southeast Asian Games host 2013	Succeeded by 2015 Singapore
