= List of museums in Yangon =

This is a list of museums in Yangon, Myanmar.

- Bogyoke Aung San Museum
- Myanmar Gems Museum
- Myanmar Motion Picture Museum
- National Museum of Myanmar
- Planetarium (Burma)
- Yangon Drugs Elimination Museum
- Shwedagon Pagoda Museum
- Space Museum (Yangon)

== See also ==
- List of museums in Burma
