= Naypyidaw Zoological Gardens =

Naypyidaw Zoo
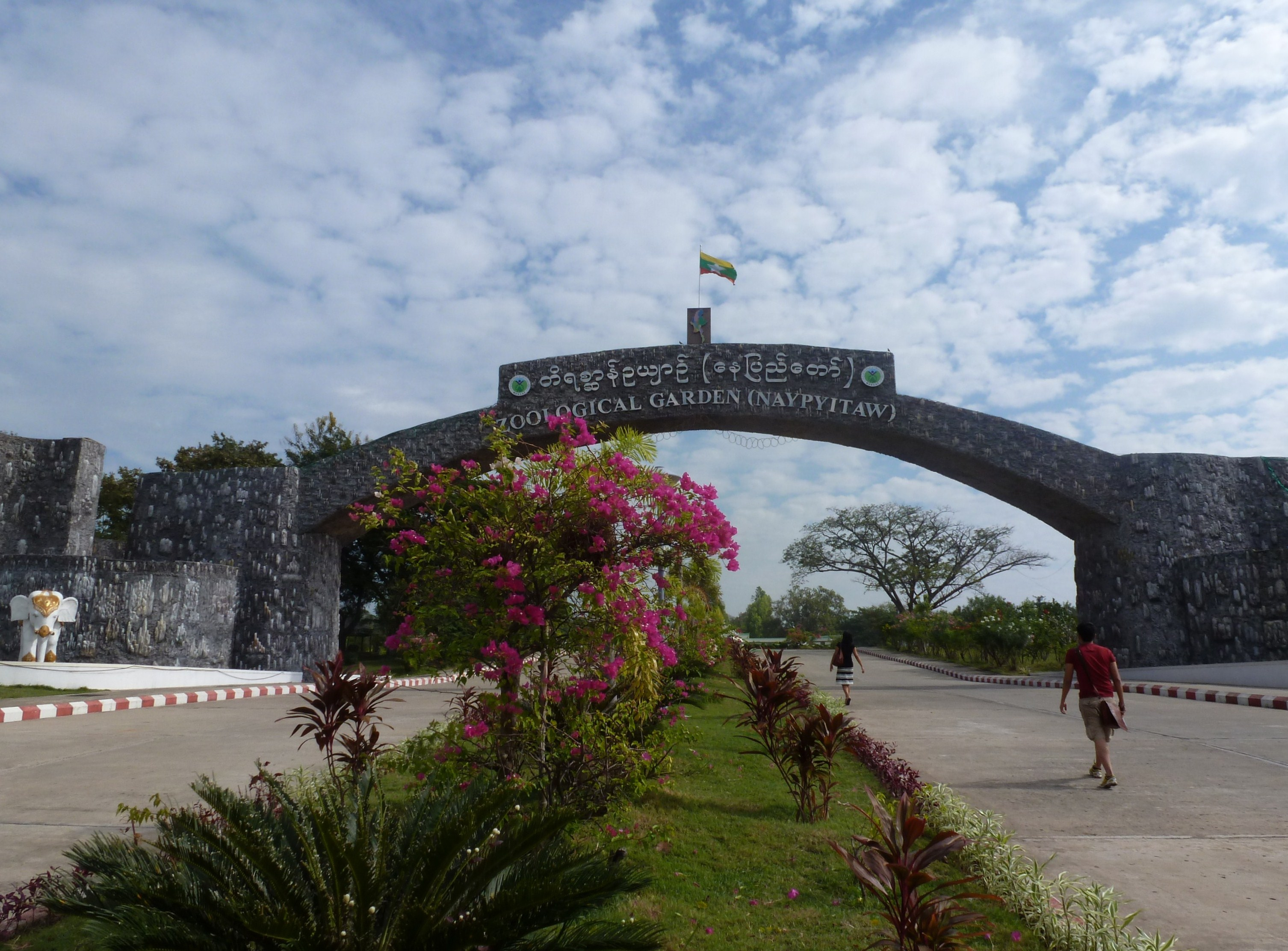
- Naypyidaw Zoo
- Interactive map of Naypyidaw Zoo
- 19.863937°N 96.255815°E
- Date opened: 27 March 2008
- Location: Naypyidaw; Mandalay Region, Myanmar
- Land area: 612 acres (247 hectares)
- No. of animals: 634 (2009)

The Naypyidaw Zoological Gardens (pronounced [nèpjìdɔ̀ təɹeiʔsʰàɰ̃ ʔṵjɪ̀ɰ̃]) located in Naypyidaw is the largest zoo in South East Asia. Located on the Yangon-Mandalay highway about 250 miles (400 km) north of Yangon, the 612-acre (247-hectare) zoo opened on Myanmar's Armed Forces Day (27 March) in 2008 with about 420 animals transferred from the Yangon Zoological Gardens.

The zoo has elephants, crocodiles, tigers, deer, leopards, monkeys, white tigers, zebras, kangaroos and a hippopotamus. It also has an air-conditioned penguin house.

In December 2009, the zoo had 634 animals of 89 species, including 304 from 34 species of mammals; 265 from 44 bird species; and 65 from 11 reptile species.

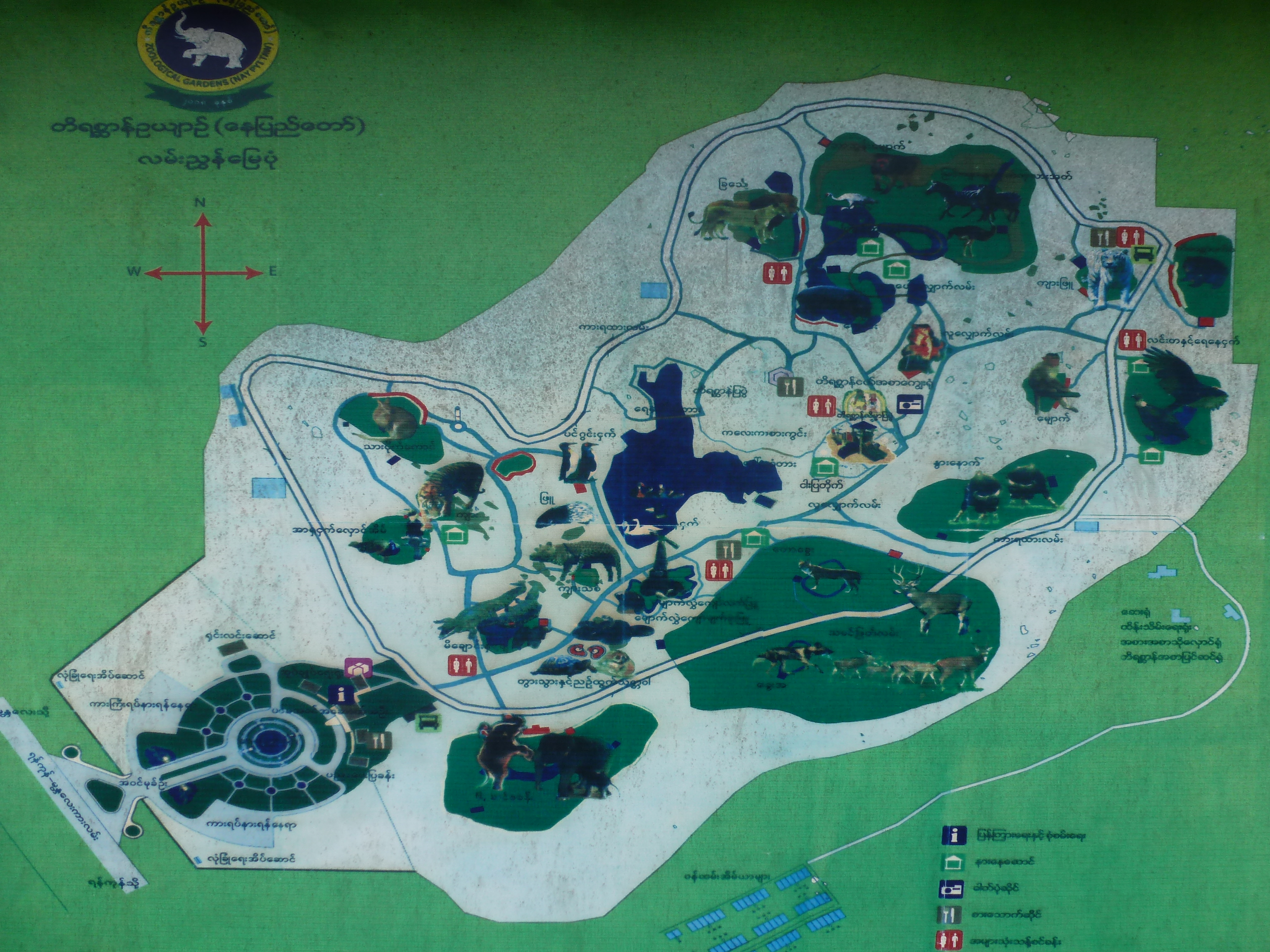
Map of the zoo

== See also ==
- National Herbal Park
- Naypyidaw Safari Park
- Naypyidaw Water Fountain Garden
- Yadanabon Zoological Gardens
- Yangon Zoological Gardens
