= Ngalaik Dam =

Dam in Naypyidaw territory, Myanmar

Coordinates: 19°51′33.8″N 96°00′39.1″E

Ngalaik Dam is a dam and reservoir on Ngalaik Creek in the Pyinmana Township of the Mandalay Region of central Burma, near the capital of Naypyidaw. It was constructed between 1978 and 1987.

The dam is approximately 82 feet (25 m) high and 3,980 feet (1,210 m) in length. The full capacity of the reservoir is 75,000 acre-feet (93,000,000 m^{3}), which is enough to irrigate 21,100 acres (85 km^{2}) of land for agricultural purposes. The main canal of the reservoir is 13.32 miles (21.44 km) in length, and its distributary canals are in total 51.68 miles (83.17 km) long.

The dam and surrounding areas also provide recreation facilities for the public from the nearby capital of Naypyitaw. Facilities for some boating, especially rowing, exist at the dam, although the facilities are generally not well-maintained. There is a small restaurant and an eco lodge at the site which provides facilities for the public.
