= National Herbal Park =

Park in Naypyidaw, Myanmar

Coordinates: 19°44′58.27″N 96°6′28.55″E

- အမျိုးသား ဆေးဖက်ဝင် အပင်များ ပန်းခြံ
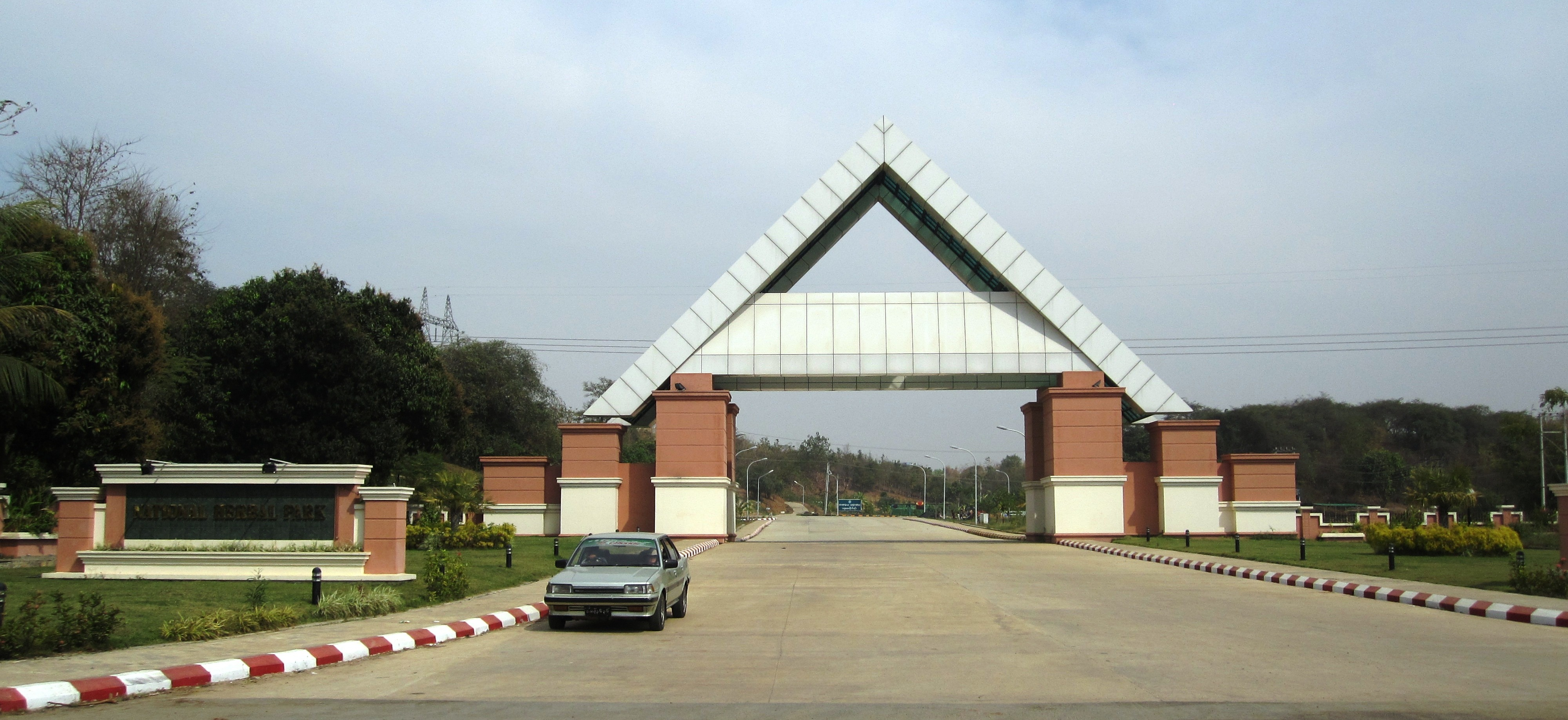
- Entrance to the park
- Interactive map of National Herbal Park
- Type: Urban park
- Location: Naypyidaw
- Area: 200 acres (0.81 km^{2})
- Created: 2008
- Status: Open all year

The National Herbal Park (Burmese: အမျိုးသား ဆေးဖက်ဝင် အပင်များ ပန်းခြံ) is a 200-acre (0.81 km^{2}) park located near the Naypyidaw-Taungnyo Road in Naypyidaw, Myanmar. Over 20,000 herbal and medicinal plants, representing over 700 species from the various states and regions of Myanmar, are grown in the park. The forms part of the government's efforts to protect and preserve the herbs from depletion and extinction and to sustain the country's traditional system of medicine. It opened on 4 January 2008. There is no entry fee.

== See also ==
- Naypyidaw Safari Park
- Naypyidaw Water Fountain Garden
- Naypyidaw Zoological Gardens
