= Naypyidaw Water Fountain Garden =

Garden in Myanmar

Coordinates: 19°44′50″N 96°7′25″E

- နေပြည်တော် ရေပန်း ဥယျာဉ်
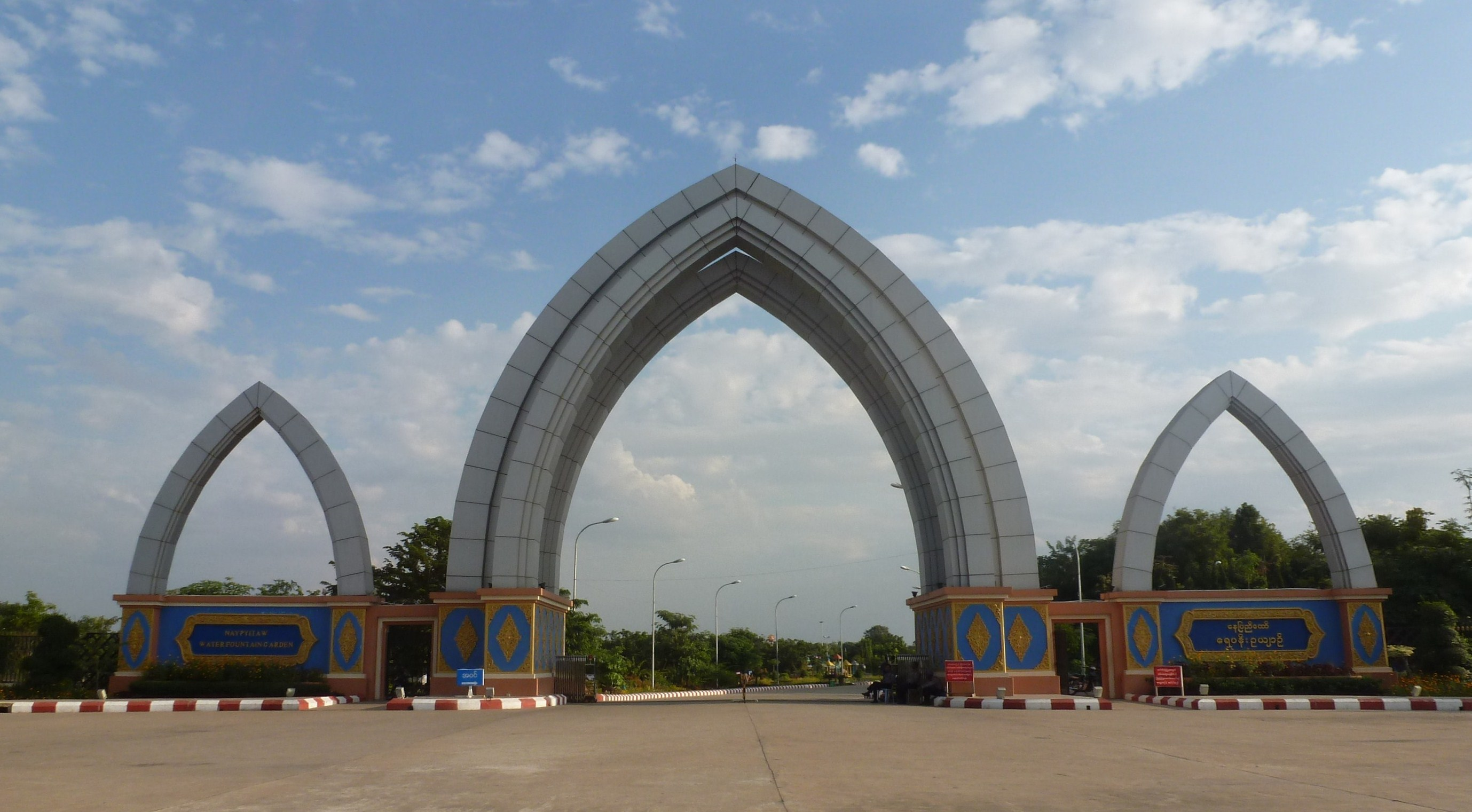
- The front gate
- Interactive map of Naypyidaw Water Fountain Garden
- Type: Urban park
- Location: Naypyidaw
- Area: 165 acres (0.67 km^{2})
- Created: 2008
- Status: Open all year

The Naypyidaw Water Fountain Garden (Burmese: နေပြည်တော် ရေပန်း ဥယျာဉ်) is a garden in Naypyidaw, Myanmar. The 165-acre (67 ha) garden is situated near the Naypyidaw City Hall with a steel structure arch-way. The garden houses a main pond with three fountains and 11 small ponds with 13 different fountains, a 30-foot (9.1 m) high clock tower, nine recreation centres, two small gardens, two stone gardens, a 10-foot wide buggy road and footpaths. The garden was set up near the Naypyidaw-Taungnyo Road.

== See also ==
- National Herbal Park
- Naypyidaw Safari Park
- Naypyidaw Zoological Gardens
