= Naypyidaw Safari Park =

Wildlife park in Myanmar

Coordinates: 19°52′17″N 96°15′15″E

- နေပြည်တော် ဆာဖာရီ ဥယျာဉ်
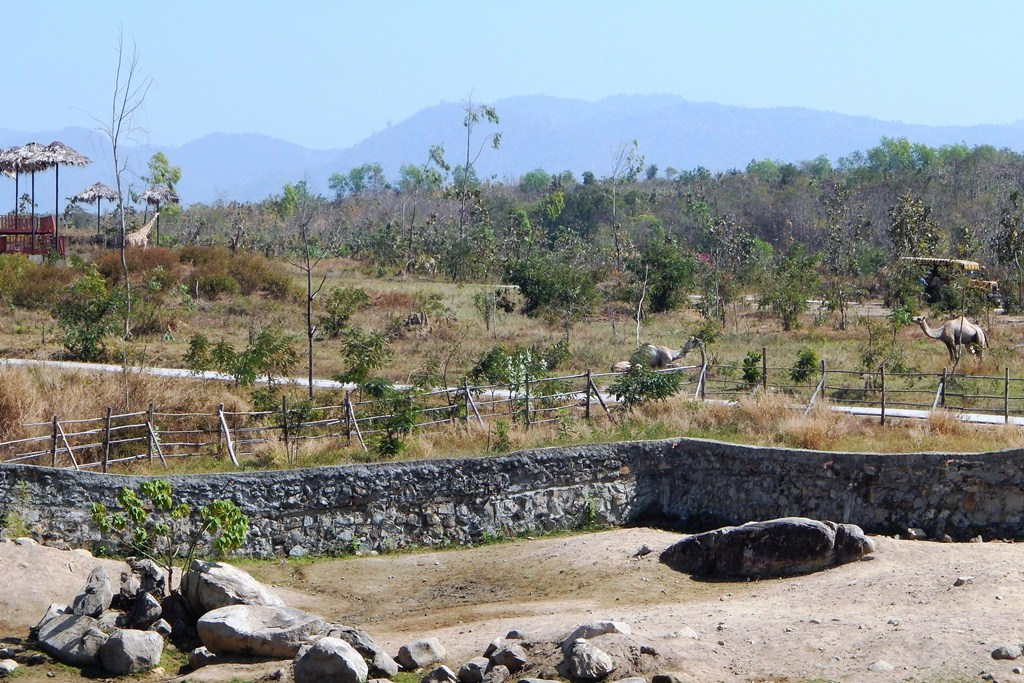
- Interactive map of Naypyidaw Safari Park
- Type: Urban park
- Location: Naypyidaw
- Area: 98.27 acres (39.77 ha)
- Created: 12 February 2011
- Operator: Ministry of Forestry
- Status: Open all year

The Nay Pyi Taw Safari Park (Burmese: နေပြည်တော် ဆာဖာရီ ဥယျာဉ်) is a wildlife park, located in Naypyidaw, Myanmar (Burma). The park consists of a 35.1 acres (14.2 ha) Asian safari, a 3.53 acres (1.43 ha) Australian safari and a 59.64 acres (24.14 ha) African safari. The Asian safari has over 100 rare animals including the domesticated wild oxen, sambur, and different kinds of deer. The Australian one features various types of leopards and the African one various African deer, camels, goats, lions, tigers, rhinos, ostriches, giraffes, zebras and ponies. Visitors can see the wildlife by buggy.

The construction of the park began in November 2010.

== See also ==
- National Herbal Park
- Naypyidaw Water Fountain Garden
- Naypyidaw Zoological Gardens
