= Yangon Zoological Gardens =

Yangon Zoo ရန်ကုန် တိရစ္ဆာန် ဥယျာဉ်
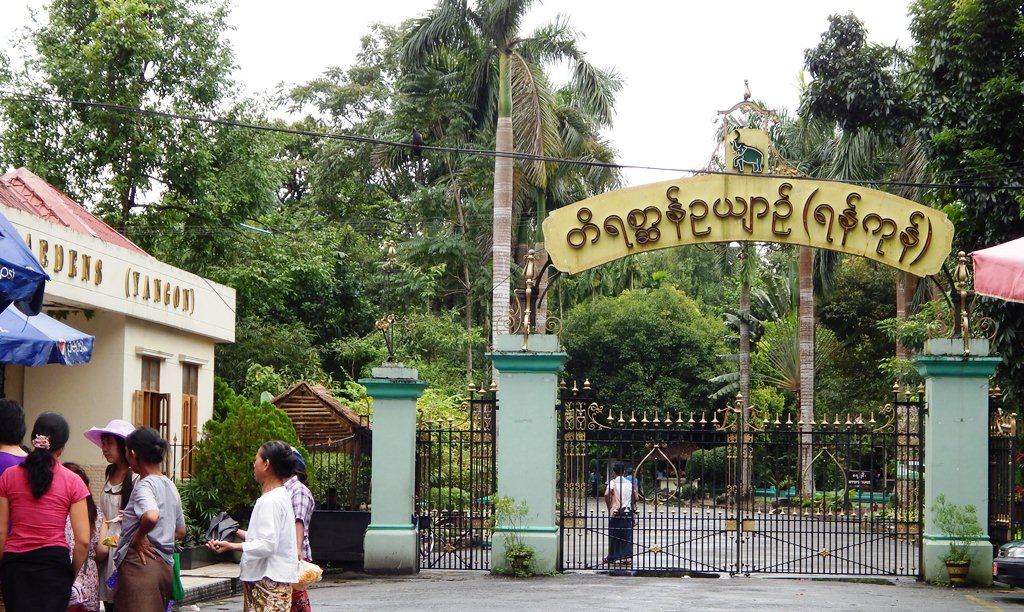
- Zoo entrance
- Interactive map of Yangon Zoo ရန်ကုန် တိရစ္ဆာန် ဥယျာဉ်
- 16°47′30″N 96°9′34″E
- Date opened: 25 January 1906
- Location: 40 Kaba Aye Pagoda Road; Yangon; Yangon Division, Myanmar
- Land area: 69.25 acres (280,200 m^{2})
- No. of animals: 1100 (2006)
- No. of species: 200 (2006)
- Memberships: WAZA, SEAZA

The Yangon Zoo (Yangon Zoo) (Burmese: ရန်ကုန် တိရစ္ဆာန် ဥယျာဉ် [jàɰ̃ɡòʊɰ̃ təɹeɪʔsʰàɰ̃ ʔṵjɪ̀ɰ̃]) is the oldest and the second largest zoo in Myanmar. Located immediately north of downtown Yangon near Kandawgyi Lake, the 70-acre (28 ha) recreational park also includes a museum of natural history, an aquarium and an amusement park. With a collection of nearly 200 species and 1,100 animals, the zoo draws nearly 2.2 million visitors annually. The zoo was operated by the Forest Department under the Ministry of Forestry until April 2011, and is now operated by a private firm.

Yangon Zoo is open from 8 AM to 6 PM daily.

== History ==
The first collection of wild animals in Yangon began in 1882 in connection with Phayre's Museum, then situated where the Yangon General Hospital now stands. Funded by a public donation of 240,000 kyats(approximately US$240,000 then) construction started at the present site near the Royal Lake (Kandawgyi Lake) in 1901. The newly established 42-acre (17 ha) zoological gardens were formally opened as the Victoria Memorial Park and Zoological Gardens in honor of Queen Victoria. The major attraction at the opening was the white elephant of King Thibaw, the last king of then Burma, whom the British had exiled to India only 20 years earlier. In 1908 the Victoria Memorial Park and Zoological Gardens Act was passed giving the establishment a legal recognition.

The zoo was vandalized and looted during World War II. In 1951, the then Burmese government changed the name to “Rangoon Zoological Gardens and Parks.” In 1962, the zoo's area was enlarged to the present size of 69.25 acres (28.02 ha). The enlarged compound opened doors to new attractions: a museum of natural history on 4 May 1966, an amusement park on 7 October 1997 and an aquarium on 1 October 1998. The aquarium is operated by the Department of Fisheries.

Between 2003 and 2006, the zoo underwent a MMK600M (approximately US$600K) renovation program, resulting in an increase in the number of visitors from 1.1 million in 2003-2004 and 1.8 million in 2004–2005 to 2.2 million in 2005–2006.

A large number of animals at Yangon Zoo, including elephants, monkeys, rhinos, and bears, were relocated to the Naypyidaw Zoo in February 2008.

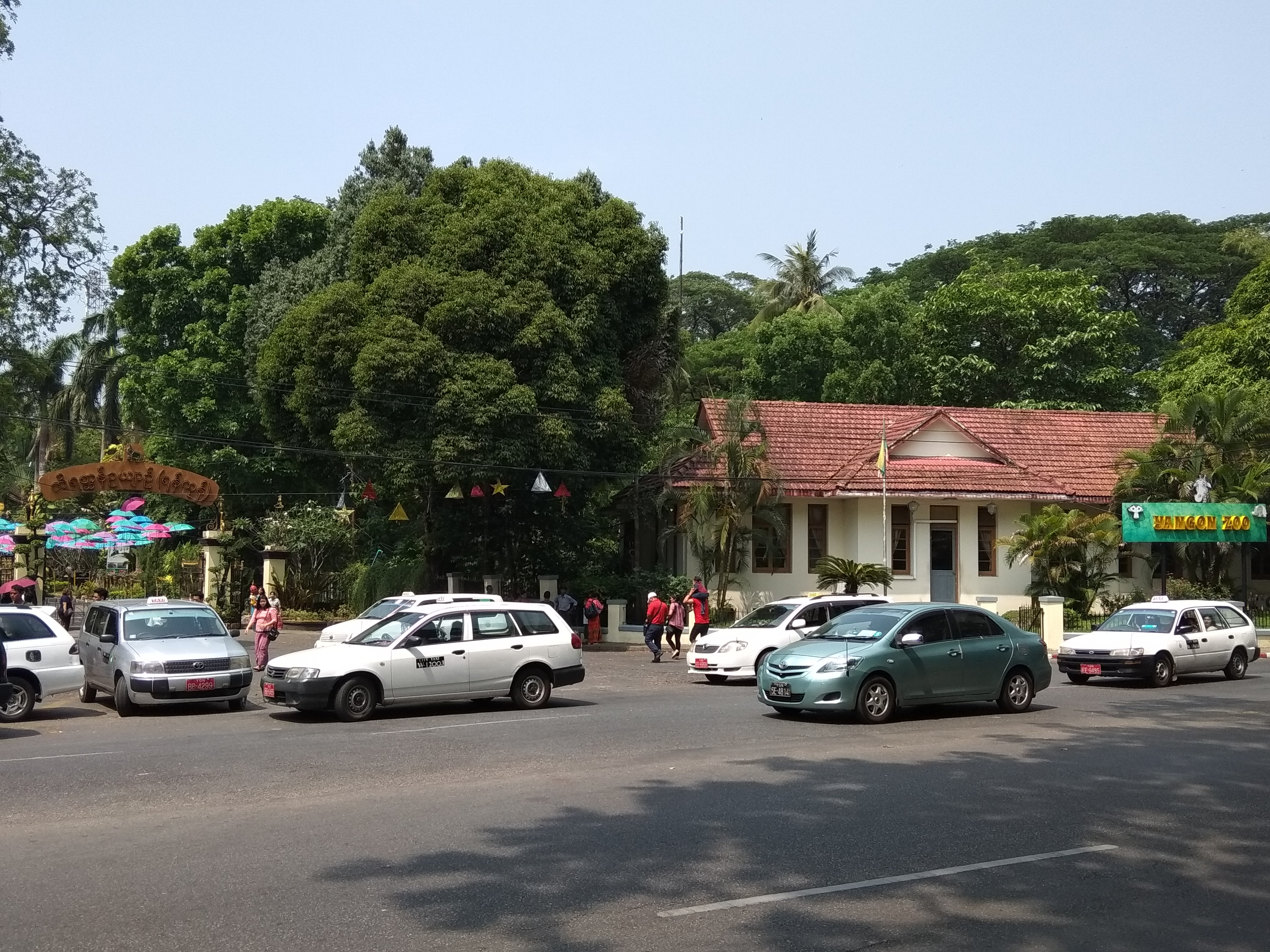
The view from the sidewalk

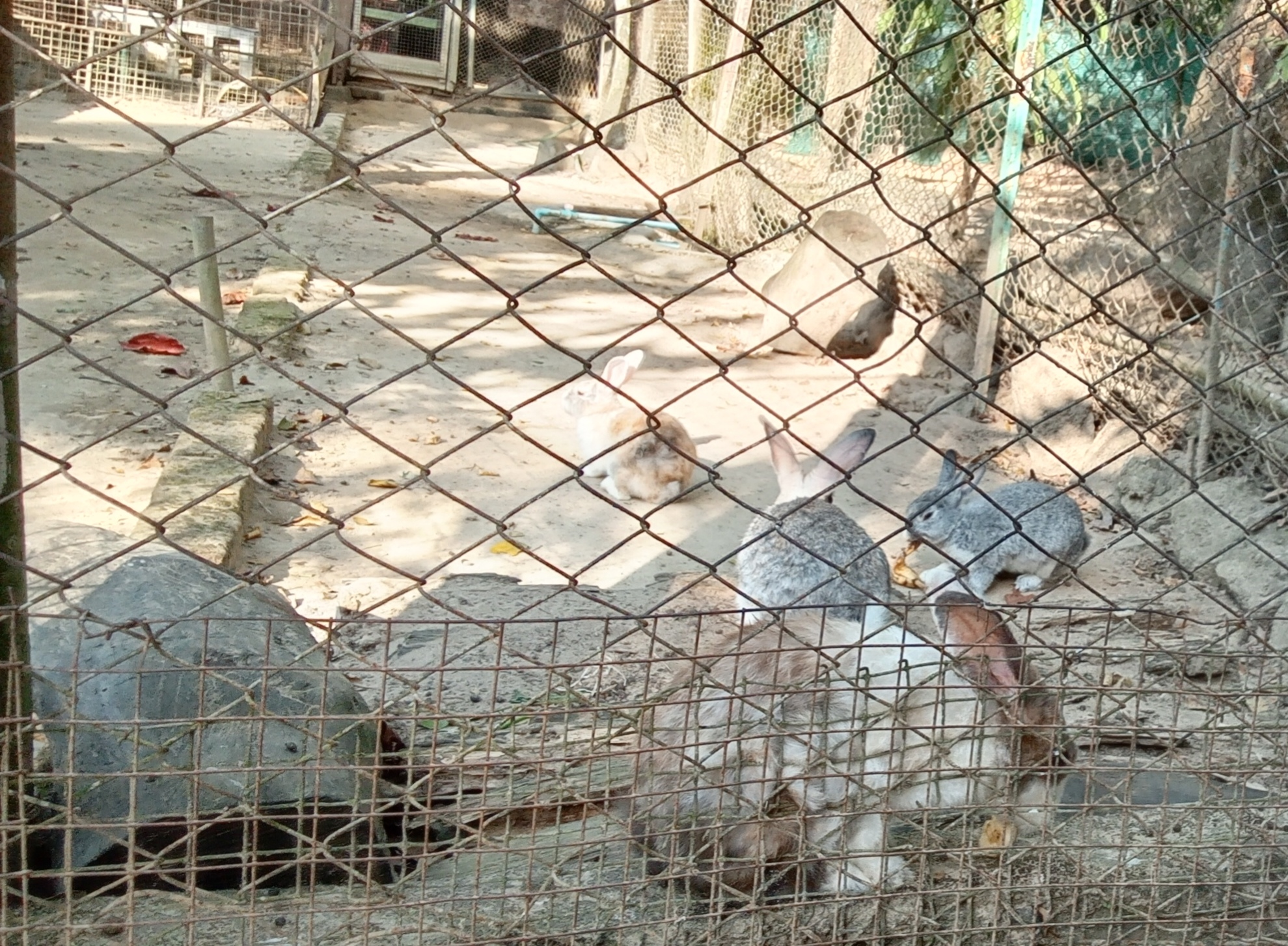
Rabbits in Yangon Zoo

== Attractions ==
=== Land animals ===
The zoo has 145 species of land animals, including 8 endangered species (the tiger, the takin, Asian elephant, the Burmese large tortoise, the great hornbill, the marsh crocodile and the eld's deer). In 2000, the number of land animals in the zoo was 1203 while that in 2006 was 1100.

Group	Number of species	Number of animals
Mammals	60	610
Birds	67	425
Reptiles	18	168
Total land animals	145	1203

=== Flora ===
In 2000, the zoo had over 300 species of flora totaling over 15,000 pieces.

Group	Number of species
Tree and plants	170
Coconut and palm	19
Bamboo and grass	23
Shrub and vine	69
Seasonal Flowers	24

=== Museum of Natural History ===
The Natural History Museum, located in the southern end of the park, houses exhibits of taxidermy, specializing in rare species of Burmese fauna with explanatory charts and captions. Many of the curators are postgraduate students of zoology from the University of Yangon.

=== Animal Performance Shows ===
Various animal shows are performed on weekends and public holidays during the fall and summer seasons (November to April).

=== Aquarium ===
Opened in 1998, the aquarium is the first large scale aquarium in the country.

=== Amusement Park ===
The amusement park has a number of rides including roller coaster 2027.
