= Yangon Space Museum =

- Established: 30 November 2025; 8 months ago
- Location: People's Square, Dagon Township, Yangon, Myanmar
- Coordinates: 16.7947°N 96.1428°E
- Type: Aerospace museum

The Yangon Space Museum is a science museum and exhibition centre located in Yangon, Myanmar. It was inaugurated in early December 2025 and aims to educate and inspire visitors, especially young people, about space science and related technologies. It is located in the People’s Park of Dagon Township in Yangon.

The museum is housed in the former Yangon Planetarium building within People’s Park which is a public recreational area.

== History ==
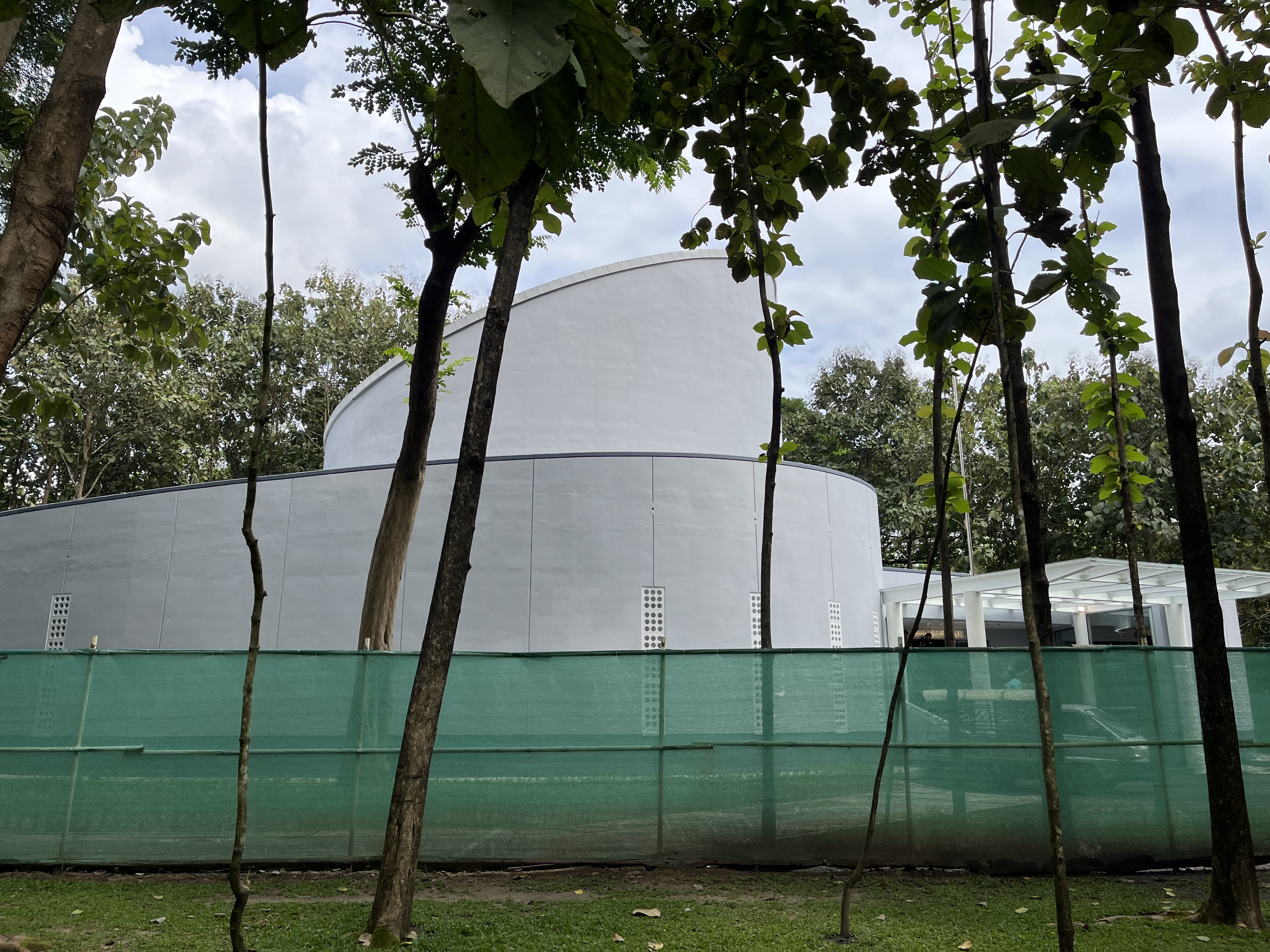
Yangon Planetarium

Originally, this site was the Yangon Planetarium (Burmese: ရန်ကုန်နက္ခတ်တာရာပြခန်း) which was built in 1986–1987 as a gift from Japan and operated for many years as a facility showing star shows under a dome. It presented a half-hour star show illuminated against the planetarium's domes ceiling. On the grounds, there was also a 1970s-era Myanma Airways plane exhibited as a walk-through exhibit.

In 2024–2025, the facility was upgraded and renovated, transforming it into a modern Space Museum with expanded educational exhibits and interactive displays.

The museum was formally opened in December 2025 by Senior General Min Aung Hlaing. He claimed the museum's role is to inspire young people's creativity and support national development through science education. The opening ceremony included visits to multiple areas of the museum and demonstrations of model satellites including space station displays.

== Features ==
The museum exhibits a Deep Space Exploration Gallery that explores deep space probes within the solar system. It has a space station gallery that displays information about space stations, and a Spiral Walkway Gallery that presents the thoughts and theories of ancient Greek scholars along with their theoretical discoveries and the history of rockets. The main gallery includes a dome video clip that shows the history of Earth’s formation, information about the planets in the solar system and discoveries made in the universe.

== See also ==
- List of museums in Yangon
