= Myanmar Gems Museum =

Museum in Yangon, Myanmar

- Location: 66 Kaba Aye Pagoda Road, Mayangon, Yangon, Myanmar
- Coordinates: 16°51′18″N 96°09′23″E

Myanmar Gems Museum, in Yangon, Myanmar, is a museum dedicated to precious Burmese gem stones. The museum is located on the third floor of a four-story building, located near Kaba Aye Pagoda.

The building also houses the Gems Mart, which consists of 82 stores on three floors, and sells high-quality raw and finished gem products, offering rubies, sapphires, pearls, jade and more. The mart is open from 9 am to 5 pm Tuesday through Sunday. The museum building is the site of semi-annual Myanmar Gems Emporium, attended by gems and jewellery merchants from around the world.
