= Kyaw Kyaw Min =

Burmese politician

Colonel Kyaw Kyaw Min

Regional Minister of Security and Border Affairs of Mandalay Region Government
- Incumbent
- Assumed office 1 August 2021
- Chief Minister: Maung Ko
- In office 6 July 2017 – 1 February 2021
- Chief Minister: Zaw Myint Maung
- Preceded by: Col Myo Min Aung
- Succeeded by: Himself

Member of Mandalay Region Administration Council
- In office 12 February 2021 – 1 August 2021

Personal details
- Born: 24 October 1966 (age 59) Kyaukpadaung, Myanmar
- Spouse: Khaing Ni San
- Children: 3
- Parent(s): Ba Whei (father); Khin Hnin Yi (mother)

Kyaw Kyaw Min is a Burmese politician who currently serves as a minister of Security and Border Affairs for the Mandalay Region. He also served as a member of Pyithu Hluttaw. He is also a member of Mandalay Region Administration Council from 12 February 2021 to 1 August 2021.

== Political career ==
He is a colonel in the Burmese military. He was elected as a Pyithu Hluttaw MP elected representative from the military at the 2015 Myanmar general election.

He is one of the ministers of the Mandalay Region Government. He serves as a minister of Security and Border Affairs for the Mandalay Region.
