= Ywet Nu Aung =

Burmese human rights lawyer (c.1979-)

- ရွက်နုအောင်
- Born: c. 1979 (age 45–46); Mandalay, Myanmar
- Occupation: Lawyer
- Notable work: Naypyidaw Victoria rape case

Ywet Nu Aung (Burmese: ရွက်နုအောင်; born c. 1979) is a Burmese human rights lawyer known for taking on legal challenges against Buddhist nationalists. She was a member of the Mandalay Region's Central Executive Committee of the National League for Democracy and the party's legal adviser.

== Career ==
In 2017, Ywet Nu Aung represented Swe Win, editor-in-chief of Myanmar Now, in a defamation lawsuit filed by supporters of Wirathu. As a result of working on Swe Win's case, she was threatened both online and physically by members of a Buddhist nationalist group Ma Ba Tha.

In 2019, she gained prominence after representing the family of a toddler who was sexually assaulted at a private primary school in Naypyitaw. In response to this case, there was a wide-ranging investigation and lawsuit that quickly garnered national attention. Ywet Nu Aung was named in The Irrawaddy's "Ten Myanmar Women Who Inspired Us in 2020" for her "outstanding legal work".

In the aftermath of the coup d'état in Myanmar in 2021, she represented a number of prominent arrested politicians. She was a member of the legal defense team for detained State Counsellor Aung San Suu Kyi, National League for Democracy (NLD) patron Win Htein, and former Mandalay Region Chief Minister Zaw Myint Maung who was arrested on multiple charges.

Following a court hearing in Obo Prison for Zaw Myint Maung's case, Ywet Nu Aung was arrested by the military junta on 27 April 2022. She was convicted of violating Section 50 (J) of the Counter-Terrorism Act for allegedly providing financial support to the People’s Defense Force (PDF). The junta-controlled court sentenced her to 15 years in prison with hard labor on 27 December 2022.

In May 2024, she was the prizewinner of the Ludovic Trarieux International Human Rights Prize for 2024.
