= Chief Minister of Mandalay Region =

Chief Minister of the Mandalay Region
- မန္တလေးတိုင်းဒေသကြီး ဝန်ကြီးချုပ်
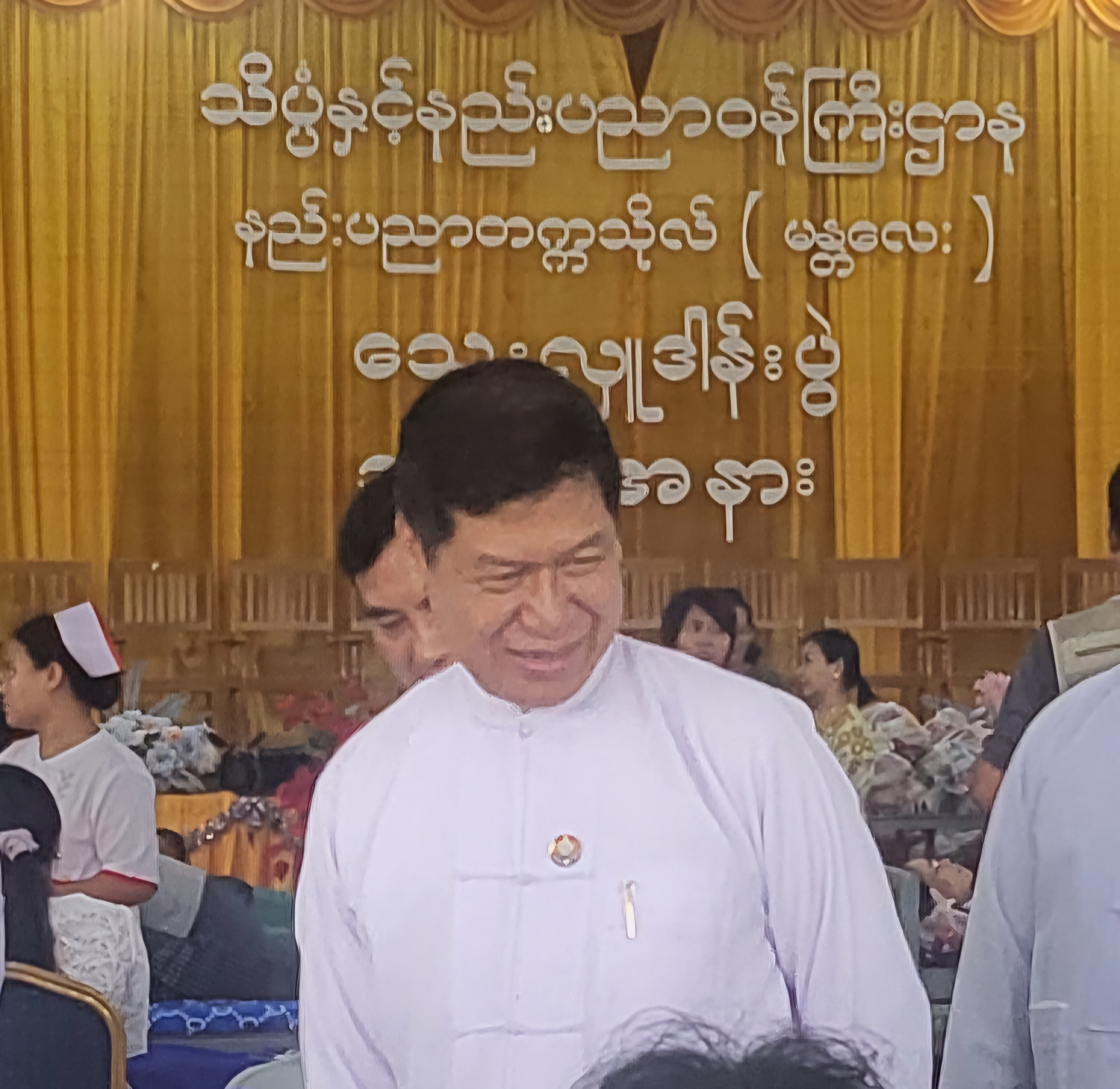
- Incumbent; Myo Aung since 1 February 2023
- Nominator: Mandalay Region Hluttaw
- Appointer: President of Myanmar
- Term length: Five years, renewable once
- Constituting instrument: Constitution of Myanmar
- Inaugural holder: Ye Myint
- Formation: March 30, 2011
- Website: www.mdyregion.gov.mm

The chief minister of the Mandalay Region is the Head of the Mandalay Region Government, which is a sub-cabinet of the Government of Myanmar and the regional government of Mandalay Region The current chief minister is Maung Ko appointed by Min Aung Hlaing.

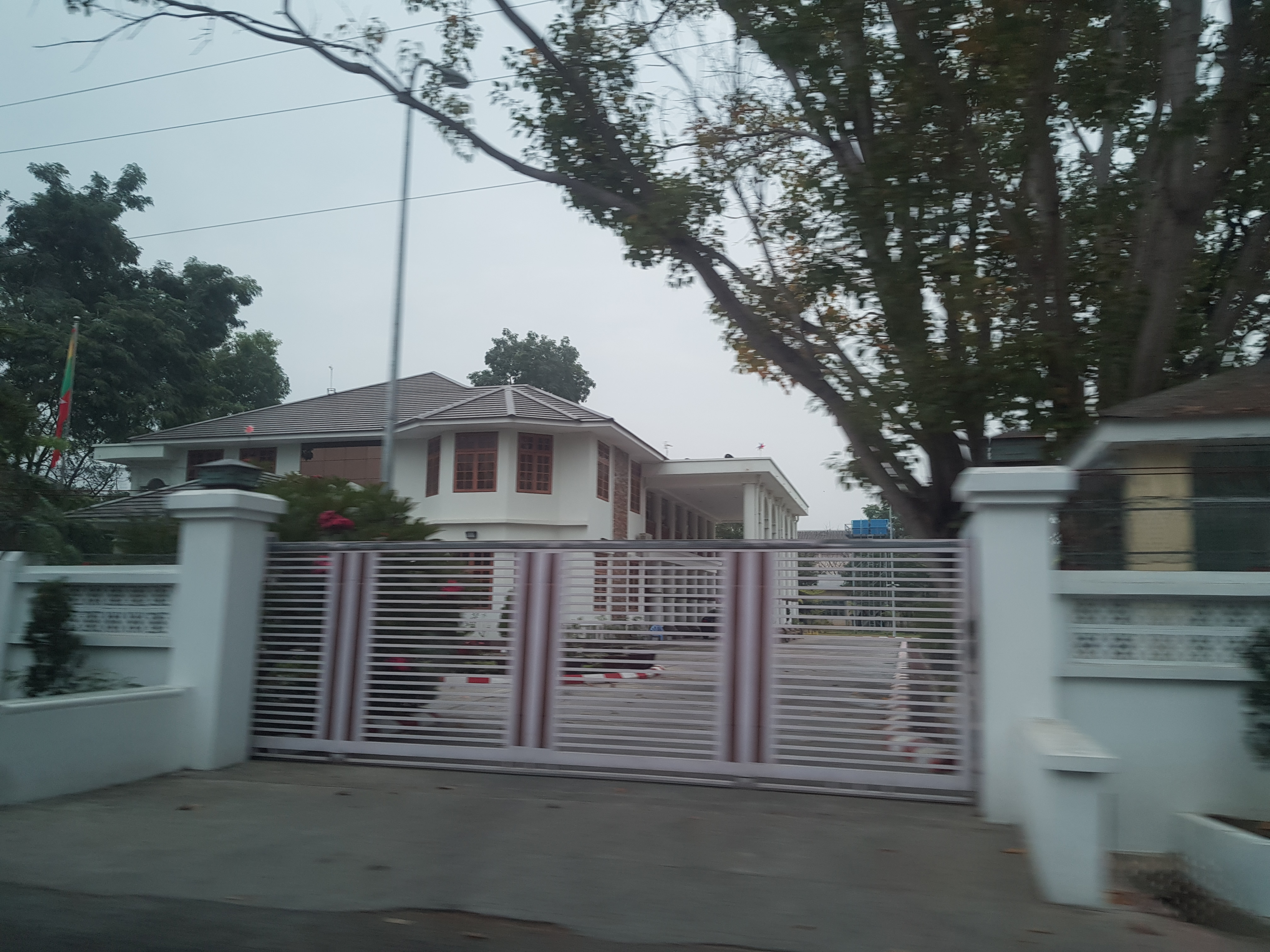
official residence

== Executive authority ==
The executive power of the Region or State Government by the Region or State Legislative Affairs extends to all areas that are not covered with the provisions of the Constitution. Moreover, federal law allows the Region or State Government extend into matters.

== Government office ==
Region or State Administration Department position as chief secretary of the relevant Region or State Government. In addition, the Region or State Department of General Administration is also the office of the relevant Region or State Mission.

The government office of the Mandalay Region is situated in Aungmyethazan Township, corner of 24th and 64th street.

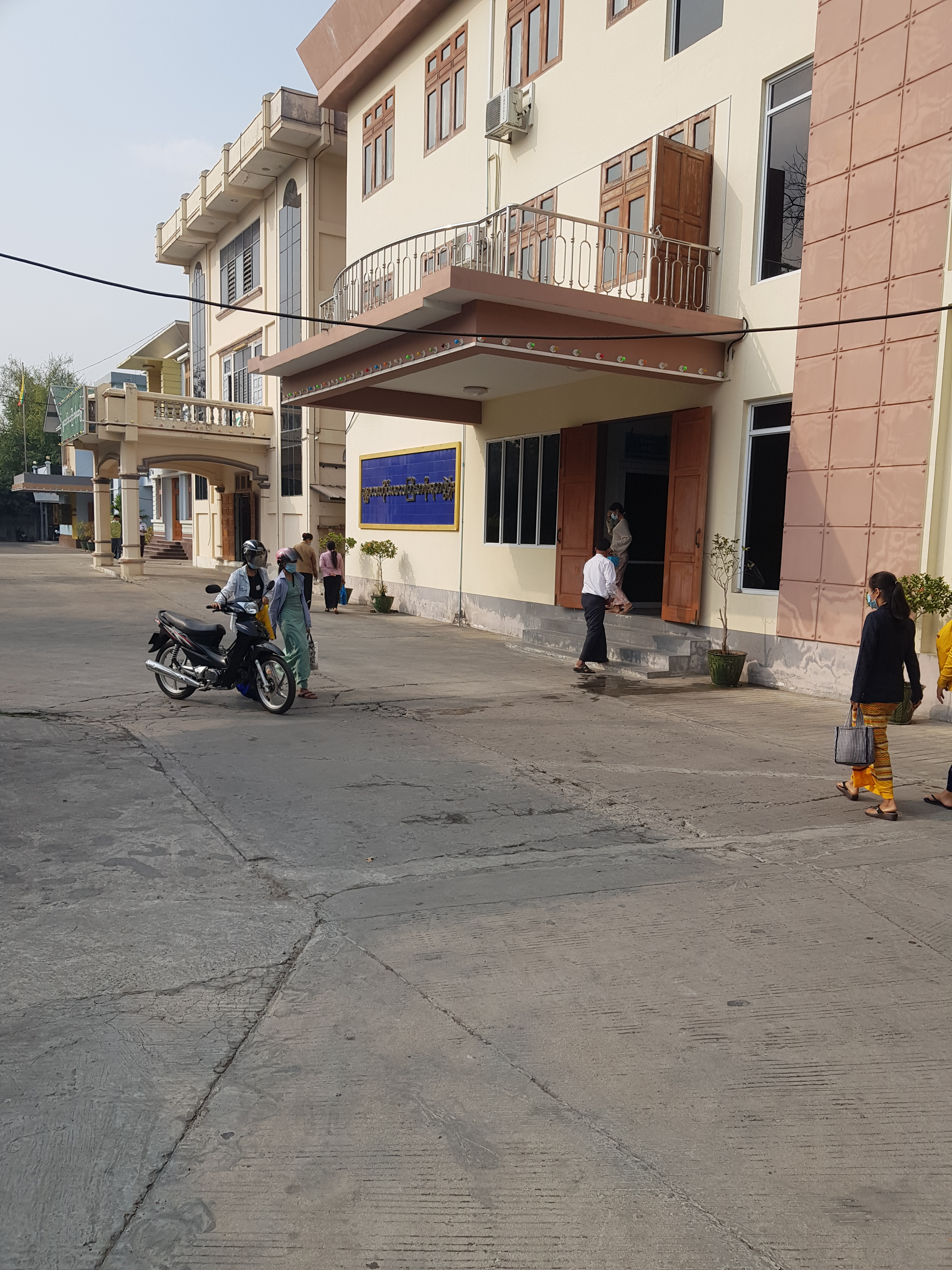

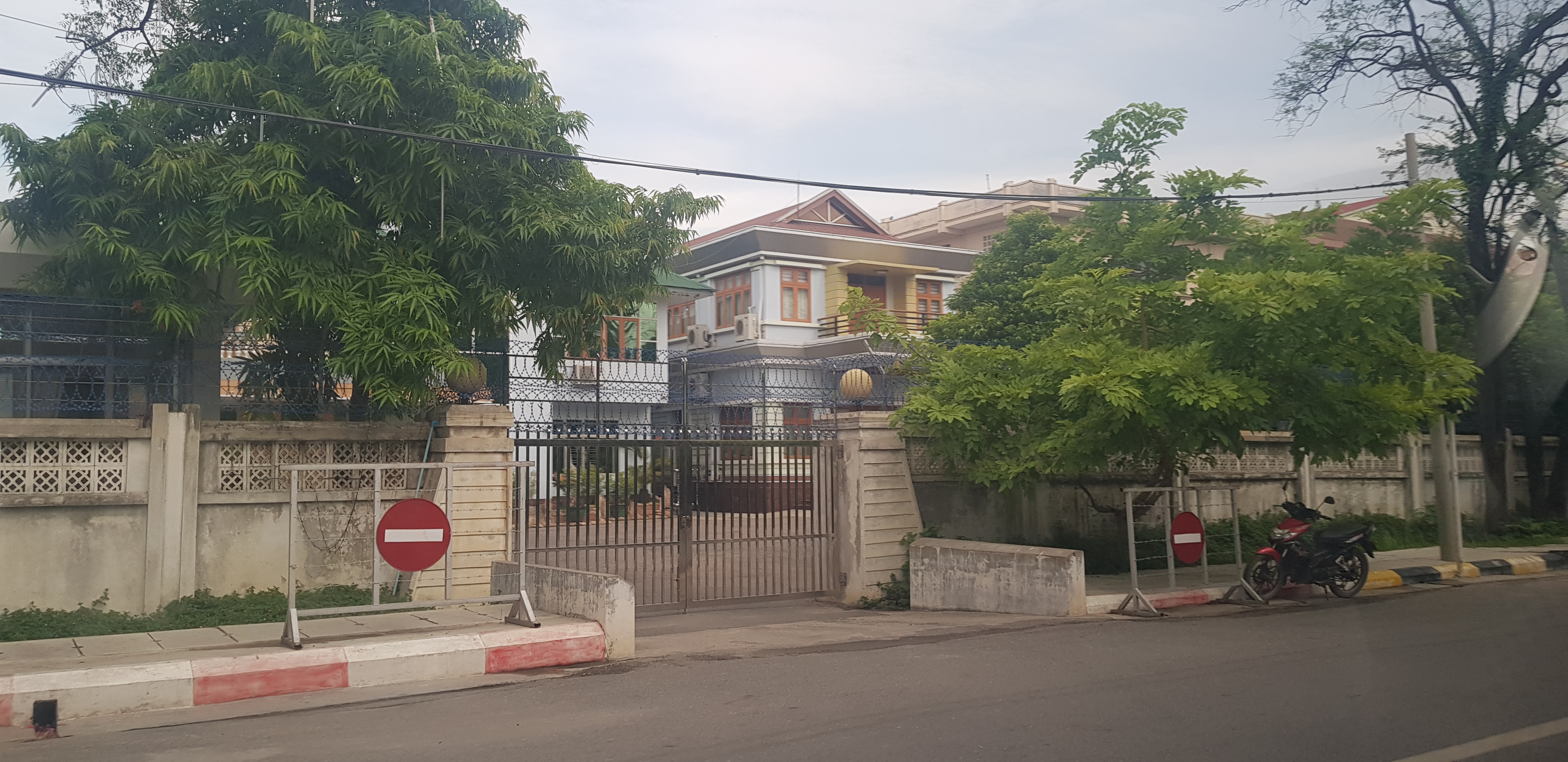
headquarters

== List of chief ministers (2011–present) ==
No.	Portrait	Name (Born–Died)	Term of office			Political party	Cabinet		Assembly
No.	Portrait	Name (Born–Died)	Took office	Left office	Days	Political party	Cabinet		Assembly
1		Ye Myint	30 March 2011	30 March 2016	1827	Union Solidarity and Development Party	I	USDP—Mil.	1 (2010)
1		Ye Myint	First democratically elected Chief Minister.						
2		Zaw Myint Maung (1951–2024)	30 March 2016	1 February 2021	1769	National League for Democracy	II	NLD—Mil.	2 (2015)
2		Zaw Myint Maung (1951–2024)	He was detained in 2021 Myanmar coup d'état						
3		Maung Ko	1 August 2021	1 February 2023	549	Independent	III	Mil.	the caretaker government era
3		Maung Ko	He was appointed by Min Aung Hlaing				III	Mil.	the caretaker government era
4		Myo Aung	1 February 2023	Incumbent	1314	Independent			

== See also ==
- Mandalay Region Government
- Mandalay Region Hluttaw
- Chief Minister of Myanmar
