= Nyi Min Han =

Burmese politician

- ညီမင်းဟန်

Member of the Mandalay Region Hluttaw for Aungmyethazan Township
- In office 3 February 2016 – 1 February 2021
- Constituency: Aungmyethazan Township № 1
- Majority: 38,872 votes

Personal details
- Born: 17 May 1987 (age 39) Natmauk, Magway Division, Myanmar
- Party: National League for Democracy
- Spouse: Mya Marlar
- Children: 2
- Parent: Han Tin (father)
- Education: University of Medicine, Magway

Nyi Min Han (Burmese: ညီမင်းဟန်; born 17 May 1987) is a Burmese politician who served as a member of parliament in the Mandalay Region Hluttaw for Aungmyethazan Township No. 1 Constituency.

== Early life and education ==
Nyi Min Han was born on 17 May 1987 in Natmauk in Magway Division of Myanmar. He graduated from University of Medicine, Magway with medical degree on 2013.

== Political career ==
He is a member of the National League for Democracy Party. In the 2015 Myanmar general election, he contested the Mandalay Region Hluttaw from Aungmyethazan Township No. 1 parliamentary constituency, winning a majority of 38,872 votes.
