= Mandalay Region Government =

- မန္တလေးတိုင်းဒေသကြီးအစိုးရအဖွဲ့
- Seal of Government

- Flag of Mandalay Region

Government overview
- Formed: 30 March 2011
- Jurisdiction: Mandalay Region Hluttaw
- Headquarters: Mandalay, Mandalay Region; 21.9846900°N 96.1095196°E
- Government executive: Maung Ko, Chief Minister
- Parent department: Government of Myanmar
- Website: www.emandalay.gov.mm

The Mandalay Region Government is responsible for leading the Mandalay Region. The cabinet is led by chief minister Maung Ko.

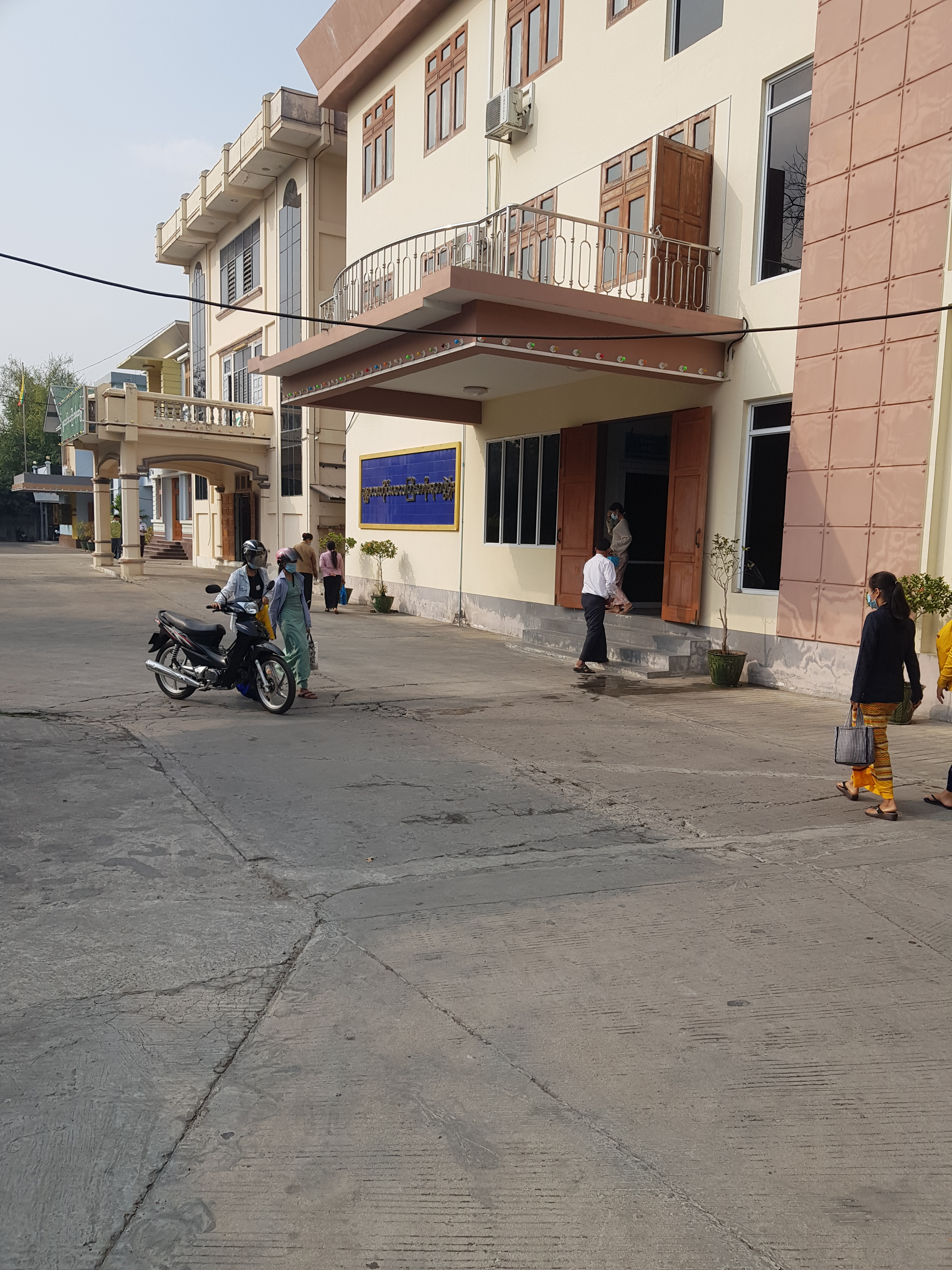
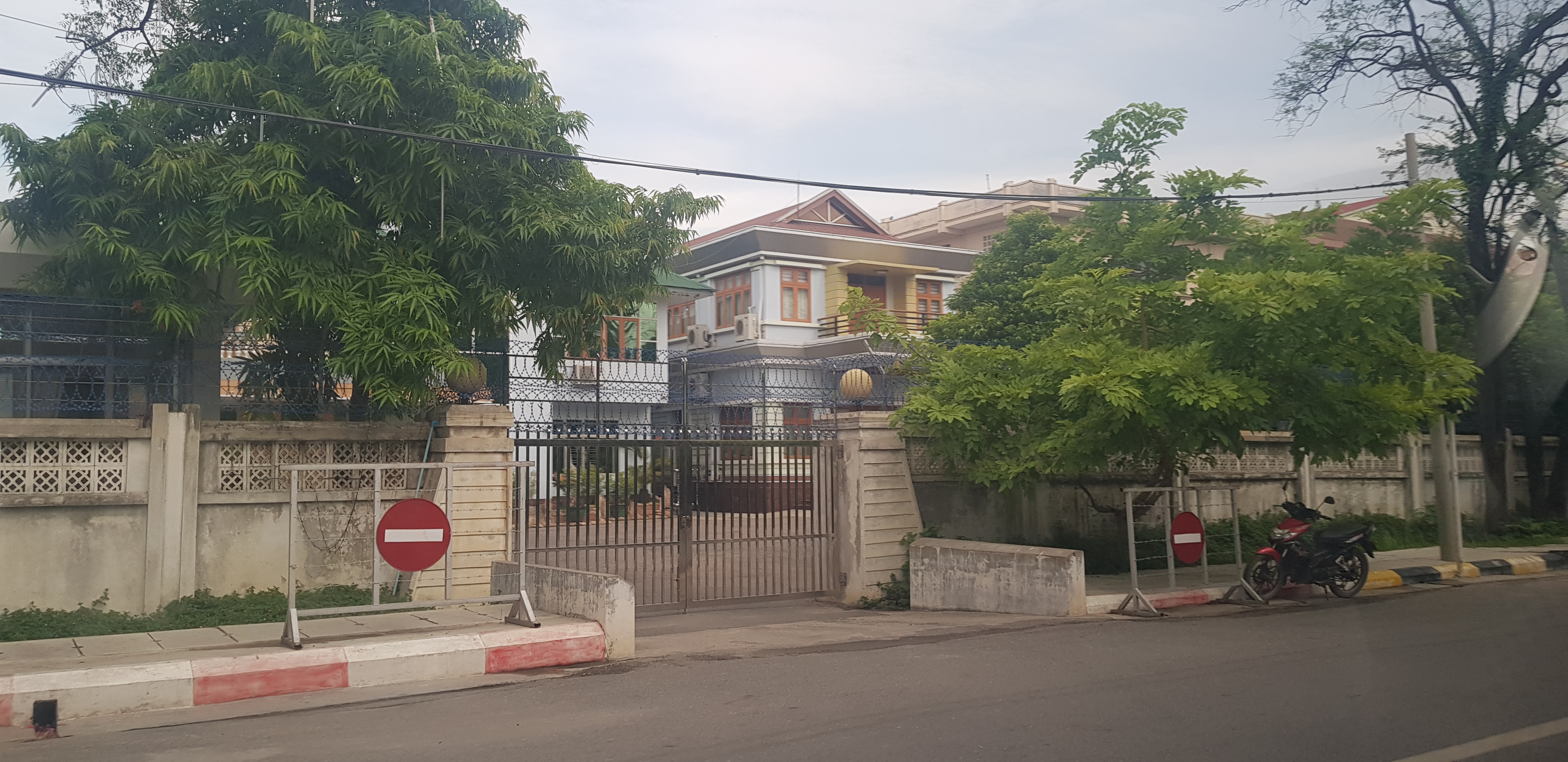
Headquarters

== Cabinet (2021 - current) ==
No	Name	Term of service			Ministry
No	Name	Took office	Left office	Days	Ministry
1	Maung Ko	1 August 2021	Incumbent	1742	Chief Minister
2	Col Kyaw Kyaw Min	1 August 2021	Incumbent	1742	Ministry of Security and Border Affairs
3	Thein Htay	1 August 2021	Incumbent	1742	Ministry of Commerce
4	Myo Aung	1 August 2021	Incumbent	1742	Ministry of Natural Resources
5	Yin Htwe	1 August 2021	Incumbent	1742	Ministry of Social Affairs
6	Police Brigadier General Sein Lwin	1 August 2021	Incumbent	1742	Ministry of Roads and Communication
7	Sai Nwam	1 August 2021	Incumbent	1742	Ministry of Ethnic Affairs
8	Kyaw San	1 August 2021	Incumbent	1742	Ministry of Municipal
9					Region Advocate

== Cabinet (2016–2021) ==
No	Name	Term of service			Ministry
No	Name	Took office	Left office	Days	Ministry
1	Zaw Myint Maung	30 March 2016	1 February 2021	1769	Chief Minister
2	Col Myo Min Aung	5 April 2016	6 July 2017	457	Ministry of Security and Border Affairs
2	Col Kyaw Kyaw Min	6 July 2017	1 February 2021	1306	Ministry of Security and Border Affairs
3	Soe Than	5 April 2016	1 February 2021	1763	Ministry of Agriculture, Livestock and Irrigation
4	Zarni Aung	5 April 2016	1 February 2021	1763	Ministry of Electricity, Energy and Construction
5	Myo Thit	5 April 2016	1 February 2021	1763	Ministry of Natural Resource and Environment
6	Myat Thu	5 April 2016	1 February 2021	1763	Ministry of Planning and Finance
7	Ye Lwin	5 April 2016	1 February 2021	1763	Ministry of Municipal
8	Sai Kyaw Zaw	30 March 2016	16 January 2018	657	Ministry of Shan Ethnic Affairs
8	Sai Parn Seng	18 December 2018	1 February 2021	776	Ministry of Shan Ethnic Affairs
9	Aung Win	7 April 2016	-	-	Region Advocate
10	Khin Aye Swe	7 April 2016	-	-	Region Auditor

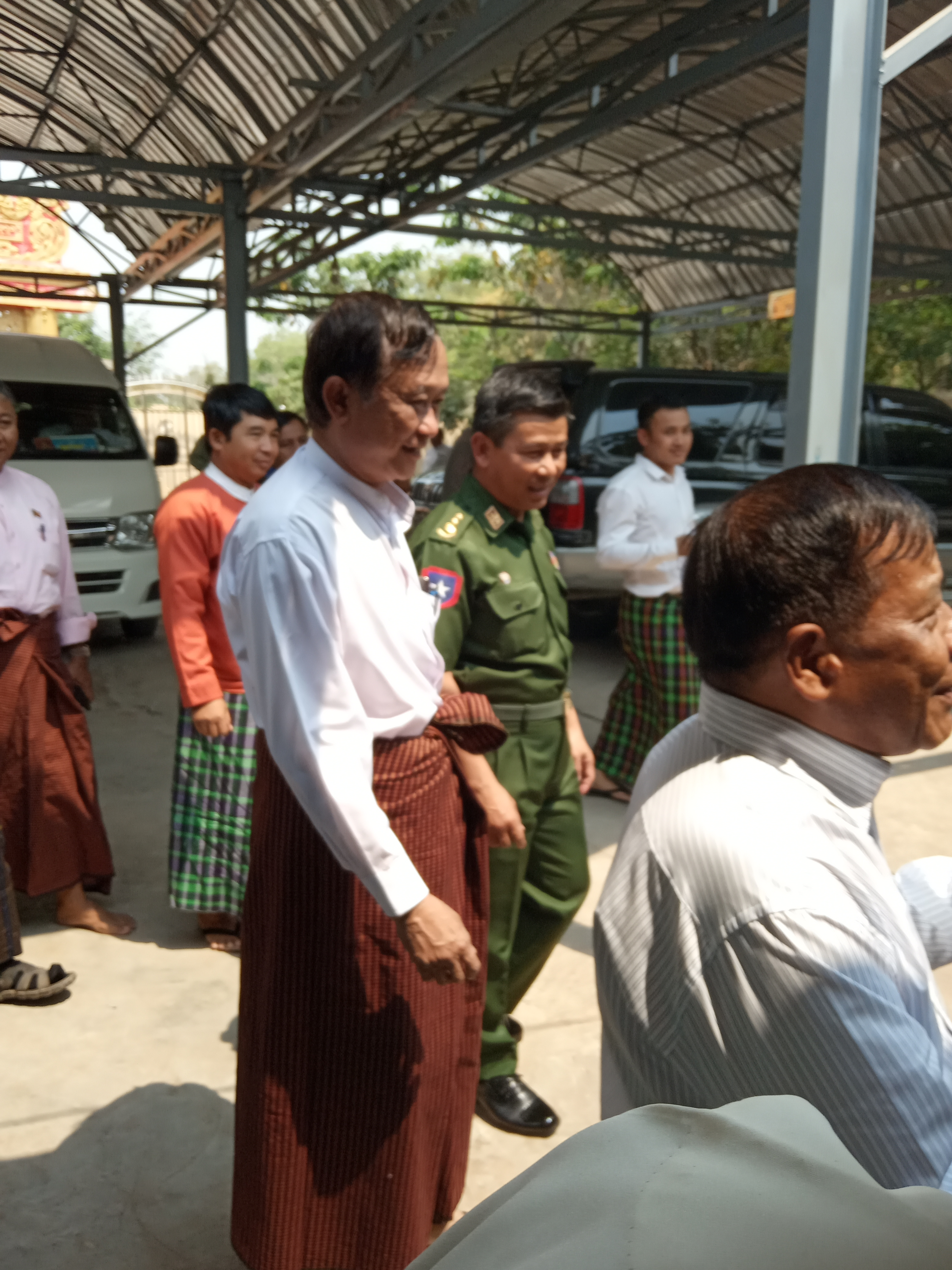
Cabinet Members

== Cabinet(2011-2016) ==
No	Name	Ministry
(1)	Ye Myint	Chief Minister
(2)	Col Aung Kyaw Moe	Ministry of Security and Border Affairs
(3)	Myint Kyu	Ministry of Finance
(4)	Myint Than	Ministry of Agriculture and Livestock Breeding
(5)	Than Soe Myint	Ministry of Forestry and Mines
(6)	Aung Zan	Ministry of Planning and Economics
(7)	Kyaw Hsan	Ministry of Transport
(8)	Kyaw Myint	Ministry of Electric Power and Industry
(9)	Aung Maung	Ministry of Development Affairs
(10)	Win Hlaing	Ministry of Social Affairs
(11)	Maung Hla	Ministry of National Races Affairs

The former Development Affairs minister is Phone Zaw Han who was replaced with Aung Maung.
