= Squatting in Myanmar =

Myanmar on globe

Following the 1962 coup d'état, Myanmar was ruled by a military dictatorship under which squatters were often evicted. In 2016, Aung San Suu Kyi led a civilian government and the first major eviction of squatters took place the following year at Hlegu Township, located northeast of Yangon; these squatters claimed they had bought their land legally.

Hlaing Tharyar Township was founded in 1989 as a place in western Yangon where refugees and displaced squatters could be housed. It expanded dramatically after Cyclone Nargis hit Myanmar in 2008 and by 2021, it was estimated to contain 181 informal settlements with around 124,000 inhabitants. Following the 2021 coup d'état, squatters protested against military intervention and were punished by evictions. Between 50 and 100 squatters were killed by State Administration Council (SAC) forces in February and by October, 8,000 families were facing eviction. Squatters under the Bayinnaung Bridge were evicted. In another township in eastern Yangon known as Dagon Seikkan, there were 53,358 squatters in 2020.

The Department of Urban and Housing Development stated in 2017 that Yangon had over than 440,000 squatters, living mainly in Dagon Seikkan and Hlaing Tharyar. The Yangon Region Government announced in 2021 that it was building 6,000 homes in which to rehouse squatters, who would pay for the construction by monthly repayment. The Mandalay Region Government said there were thousands of squatters living beside streams, roads and railways in places such as Amarapura, Chanmyathazi Township and Pyigyidagun Township.
