= Hla Moe =

Burmese politician

- လှမိုး
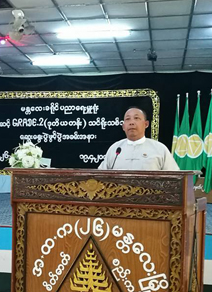

Member of the House of Representatives
- Incumbent
- Assumed office February 3, 2016
- Constituency: Aungmyethazan Township
- Majority: 87375 votes

Personal details
- Born: August 28, 1968 (age 58) Mandalay, Myanmar
- Party: National League for Democracy
- Spouse: Ohmar Kyaw
- Parent(s): Ngwe Thaung (father); Kyin Myaing (mother)
- Education: Mandalay University
- Occupation: Politician

Hla Moe (Burmese: လှမိုး; born on August 28, 1968) is a Burmese politician currently serving as a House of Representatives MP for Aungmyethazan Township. He is a member of the National League for Democracy.

== Early life and education ==
Hla Moe was born in Mandalay, Myanmar on August 28, 1968. In 1987–1997, he graduated with BSc, MSc and also PhD from Mandalay University in 2005. He also studied in Ph D, Sandwich Program, Philipps University, Germany. He would be a University teacher and writer.

== Political career ==
He is a member of the National League for Democracy. In the 2015 Myanmar general election, he contested the Aungmyethazan Township constituency for a seat in the Pyithu Hluttaw, the country's lower house, winning a majority of 87375 votes.
