= Naypyidaw Victoria rape case =

2019 criminal incident in Myanmar

Demonstration outside Criminal Investigation Department in Insein Township, Yangon, Myanmar on 6 July 2019 for Naypyidaw Victoria Rape Case

Naypyidaw Victoria Rape Case refers to the rape of a 2-year-and-11-month-old girl, nicknamed Victoria, believed to have occurred at Wisdom Hill Nursery School in Naypyidaw, Myanmar, which sparked national outrage. The police filed a case in court against a driver who worked in a nursery, but DNA evidence obtained during the investigation did not match him. Thousands of people marched to Criminal Investigation Department on 6 July 2019 to show their dissatisfaction with the police handling of the case. State leaders have verbally instructed officials from the Ministry of Home Affairs and Myanmar Police Force (MPF) to bring the case before the courts.

== Incident ==
Victoria came back from school, Wisdom Hill Private Pre-School, on 16 May 2019 with injuries that a doctor from a public hospital confirmed were the result of rape. Her mother filed a complaint with the police the following day.

== Aftermath ==
The government closed seven nurseries in Naypyidaw following the case. Win Ko Ko Thein, a senior official at the Ministry of Health and Sports, launched a "Justice for Victoria" campaign two weeks later, outlining the case's alleged discrepancies. He was detained and charged with defamation. Many local celebrities supported the cause. Many citizens changed their Facebook profile pictures to a silhouette of a little girl with the title "Justice for Victoria" to demand justice be served in the case. Rising public pressure on social media forced the government to pledge that the case would be resolved in a timely manner.

The President of Myanmar Win Myint, issued a directive to the Supreme Court of the Union, the Ministry of Home Affairs, and the Office of the Union Attorney-General, to investigate the case according to legal protocols to ascertain the facts, hold those responsible accountable, and make the results of the investigation known to the public.

On 1 July 2019, the Department of Social Welfare closed down 15 nurseries across Naypyitaw that were operating without proper licenses, including Wisdom Hill.

The case led to a wide-ranging investigation and lawsuit that quickly garnered national attention. Ywet Nu Aung, gained national prominence, after representing the family of Victoria as a lawyer. She was named in The Irrawaddy's "Ten Myanmar Women Who Inspired Us in 2020" for her legal work.

Soon after the crime was reported, an arrest was made, and the case was heard for nearly five months before the suspect was released in December, citing insufficient evidence. The accused was the Wisdom Hill school supervisor's driver. However, DNA evidence was inconclusive, and the nursery staff disputed that it was him. Victoria's father told BBC Burmese that when he showed her the CCTV footage from outside the nursery, she pointed out the man who assaulted her, saying, "Ko Ko did it at school," using the colloquial Burmese name for a young man. Based on the allegations of the victim and her parents, most members of the public appear to believe the supervisor's two teenage boys are the true offenders, and the suspected driver was a scapegoat. Nonetheless, authorities maintained that the driver was the only likely culprit in the case and denied that the two teenage brothers were the perpetrators. The brothers, whose father is a police lieutenant, were not called as witnesses in court. According to legal counsel Khin Maung Myint, who has been closely following the case, the truth has not come out because those in charge of the investigation have failed to execute their obligations.

The police force has been widely criticized for their treatment of the case, particularly for false allegations, mishandling evidence, and exposing the identities of the girl and her parents in violation of the Child Rights Act.

== Nationwide protests ==
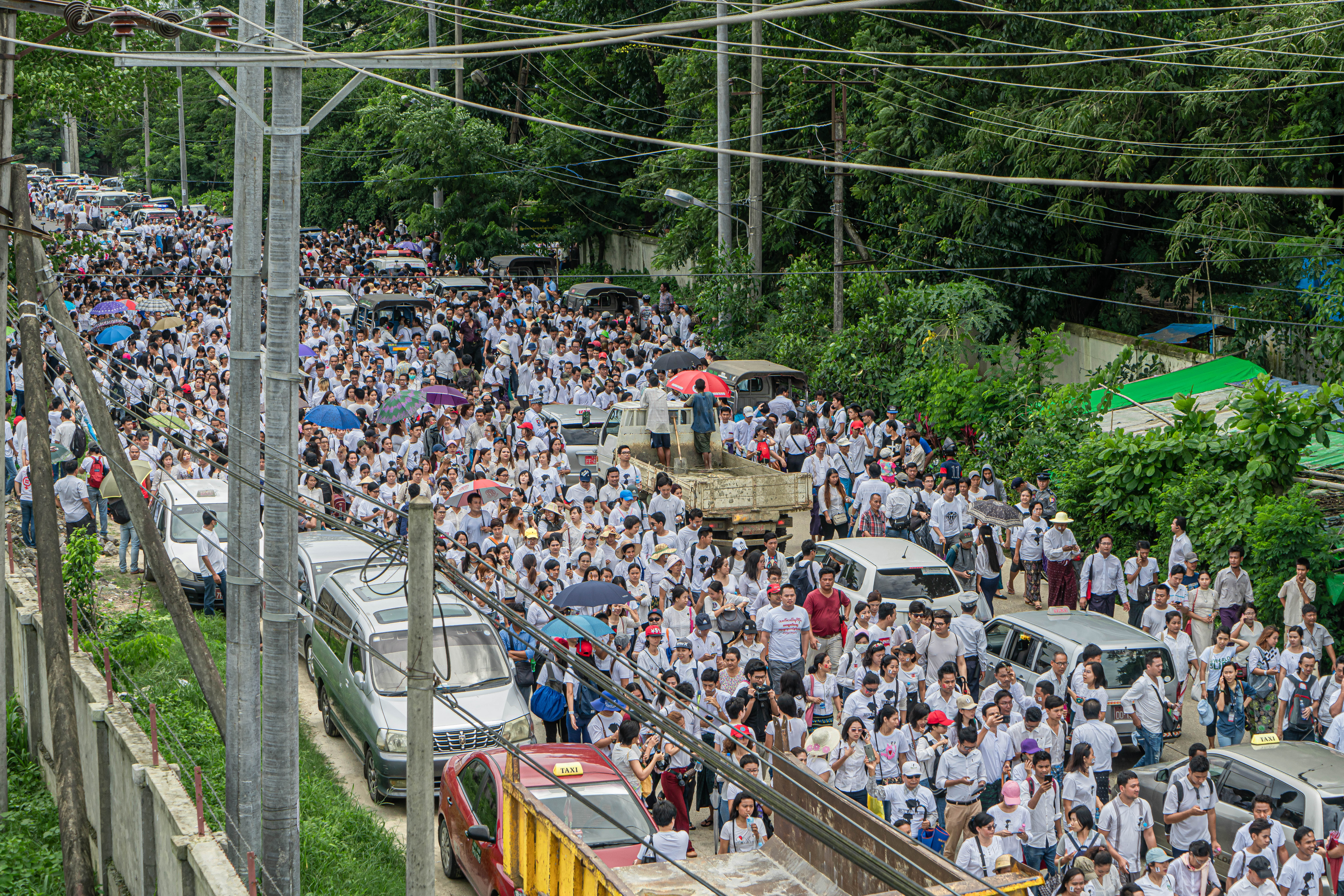
The march to demand the justice for Victoria, in Yangon

Social media users have criticized the lack of haste and professionalism of the police response, underscoring a lack of trust in the authorities in a country still emerging from decades of military rule. Nationwide protests began in major cities around Myanmar after a public campaign escalated into wider protests in response to the girl's father speaking to local media and venting his anger at the progress of the inquiry. Many people in Myanmar took to Facebook to say Aung Gyi was wrongfully accused, and that the actual culprit was at large.

On 6 July 2019, thousands of protesters marched to a police office in Yangon, demanding speedy and transparent justice in a child-rape case that has sparked national outrage. Organisers estimated as many as 6,000 protesters gathered at the Yangon office of the Criminal Investigation Department (CID) wearing white T-shirts, some printed with the words "Justice for Victoria".

On July 8, roughly 1,000 people demonstrated in Mandalay. Over 80 tricycles also joined the protest. At the protest, demonstrators chanted for the reduction and elimination of child rape cases, for the rule of law to be preserved, and for no more Victorias. On July 14, protests were staged in other major cities such as Magwe, Pathein, Hpa-an, Lashio, and Pakokku in response to the emergence of the Victoria rape case.
