= Man Thida Park =

Park in Mandalay, Myanmar

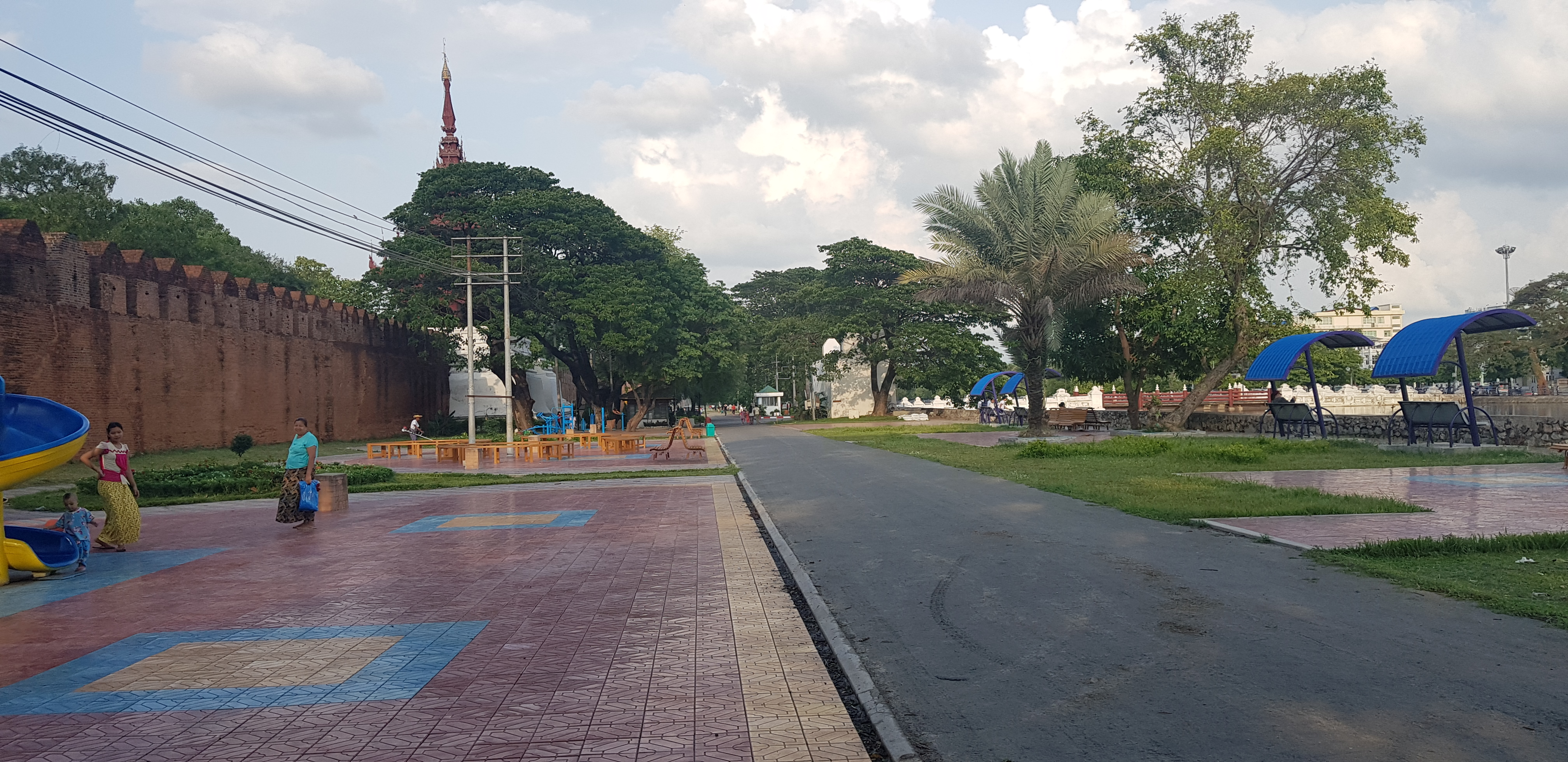
- Interactive map of Man Thida Park
- Type: Urban park
- Location: Mandalay Palace, Mandalay
- Coordinates: 21°59′00″N 96°05′42″E
- Status: Open all year: 6:30 to 17:30

Man Thida Park (Burmese: မန်းသီတာ ဥယျာဥ်) is the largest modern park in Mandalay.

== History ==
Originally built in 1959, it was demolished in 1993 before being subsequently rebuilt and re-opened it as a public park in 2018. A proposal to rebuild the park was initially introduced in the '100 Day Projects of Mandalay' by President new cabinet, but stalled due to insufficient funding. Afterwards, the Mandalay City Development Committee submitted a proposal for the project to the Security Committee, and the Hluttaw approved 300 million for the project in 2017-2018 Budget. The Central Command of Tatmadaw then declared that they would take control of rebuilding the park out of concern for maintaining the security of the palace. Rebuilding began from the Southern gate of the Mandalay Palace.

=== Location ===
The park is situated between 66th Road and 80th Road, and between 26th Road and 24th street, on the grounds between the moat and the wall of Mandalay Palace.

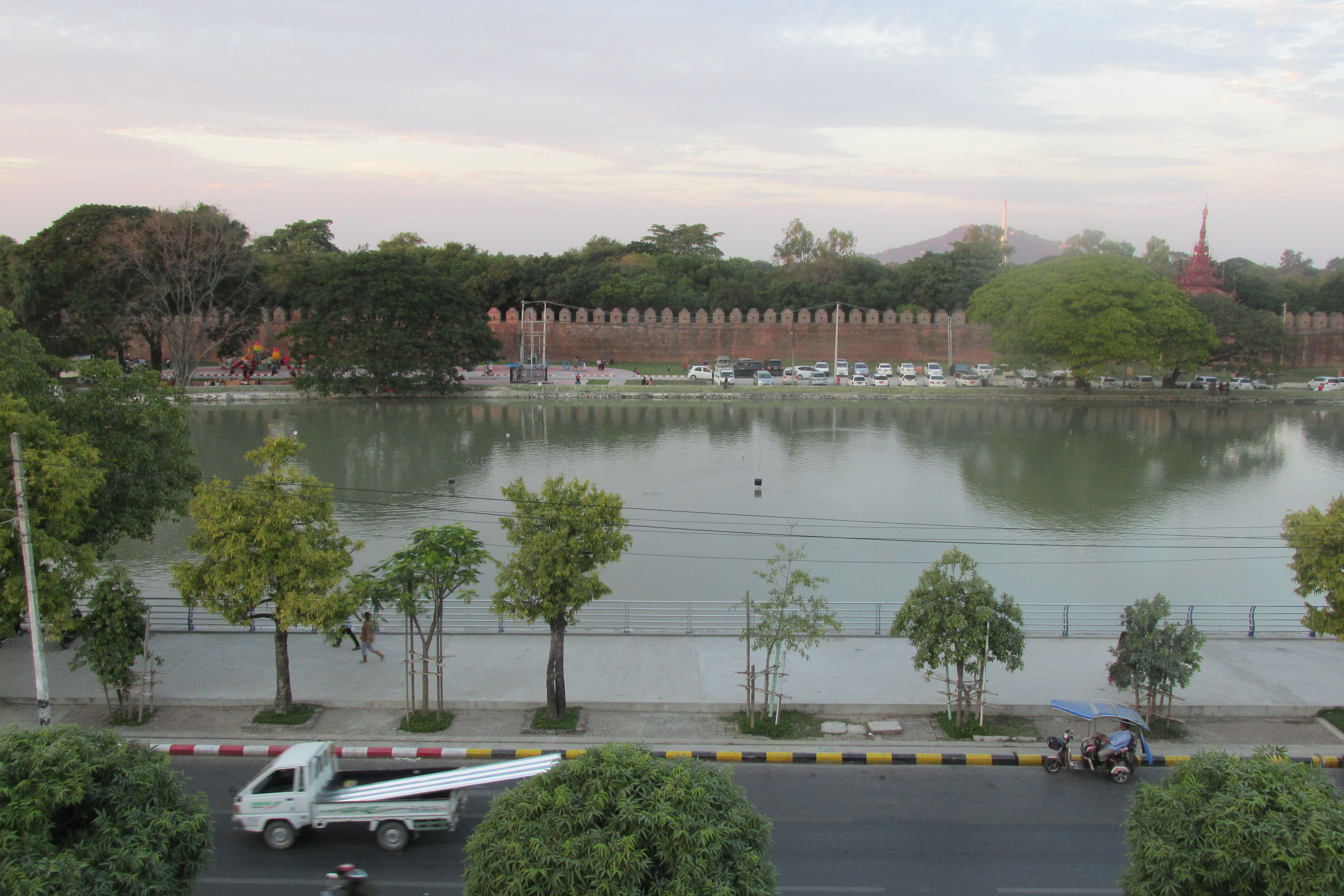
Park with Moat, Wall and Mandalay Hill

A small bridge called Myittar Paung Kuu Bridge (Pat bridge) was built across the moat.

=== Facilities ===
There is a playground and a library located in the park, as well as a statue of General Aung San by the water.
