= State and Region Government of Myanmar =

State and Region Governments of Myanmar
- ပြည်နယ်နှင့်တိုင်းဒေသကြီးအစိုးရအဖွဲ့များ

Government overview
- Formed: 30 March 2011
- Jurisdiction: State and Regional Hluttaws
- Headquarters: Myanmar
- Parent department: Union Government

The State and Region Governments (Burmese: ပြည်နယ်နှင့်တိုင်းဒေသကြီးအစိုးရအဖွဲ့များ) are the sub-cabinet of each states and regions of Myanmar. The Head of the state or region cabinet is Chief Minister (Burmese: ဝန်ကြီးချုပ်). The Member of cabinet is Minister of the state or region. The cabinet is formed with Chief Minister, Ministers and State/Region Advocate. With the agreement of State and Regional Hluttaws, the President can set the number of ministries.

== Executive Authority ==
Not contradict with the provisions of the Constitution, the executive power of the Region or State Government by the Region or State Legislative Affairs extends. Moreover, under the federal law allows the Region or State Government extends into matters.

== Government Office ==
Region or State Administration Department position as chief secretary of the entity, the relevant Region or State Government. In addition, the Region or State Department of General Administration is also the office of the relevant Region or State Mission.

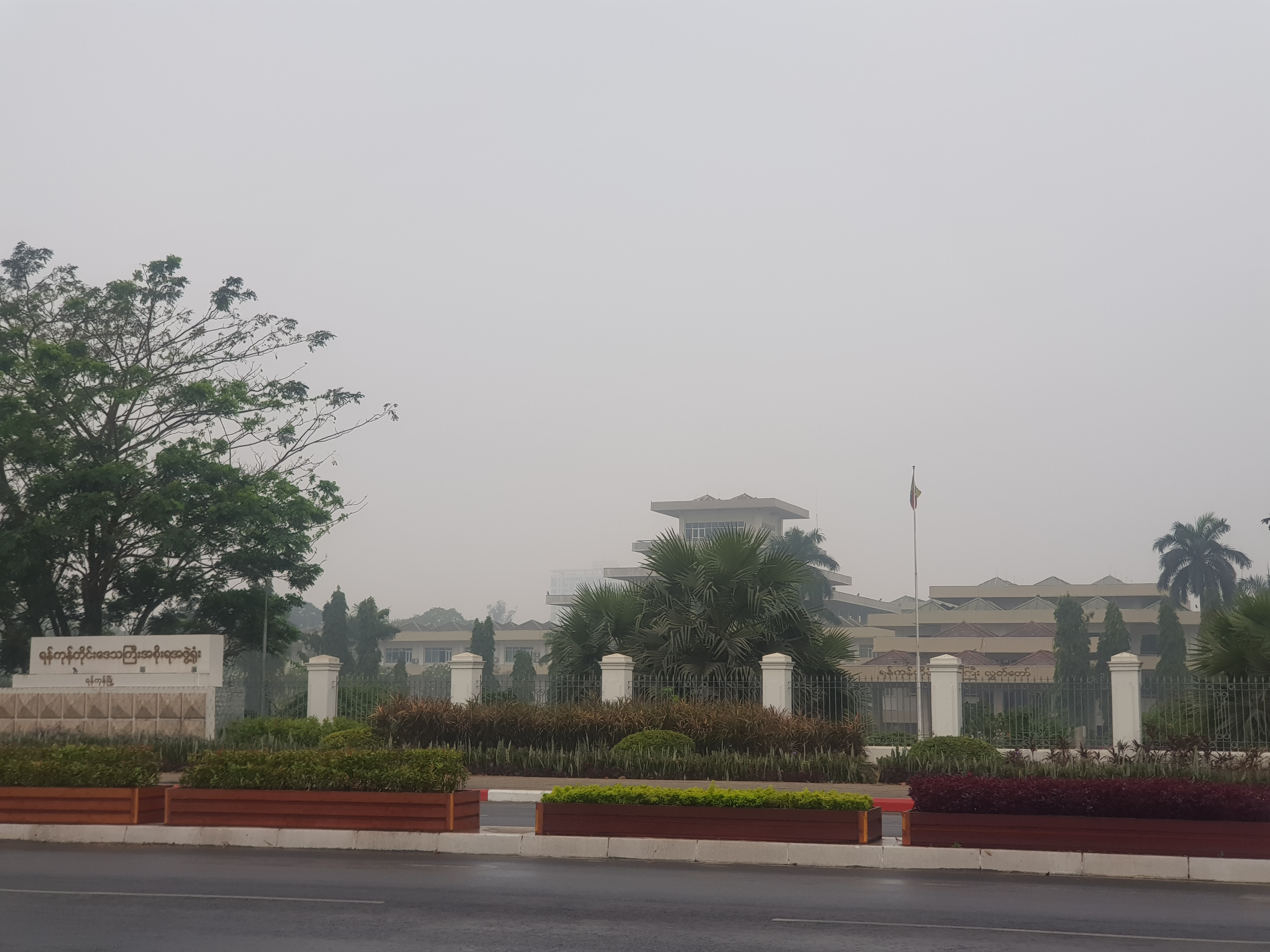
Yangon Region

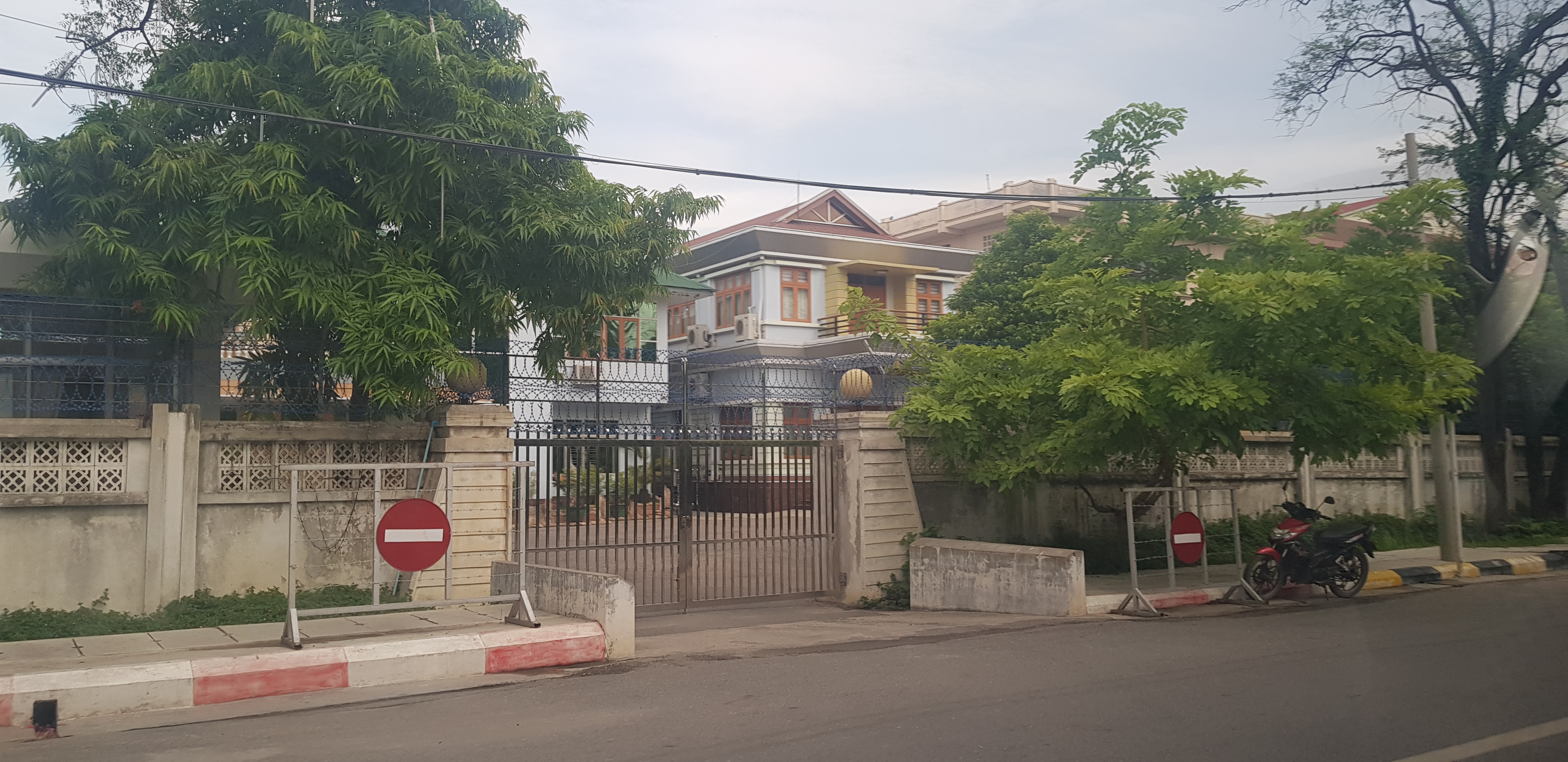
Mandalay Region

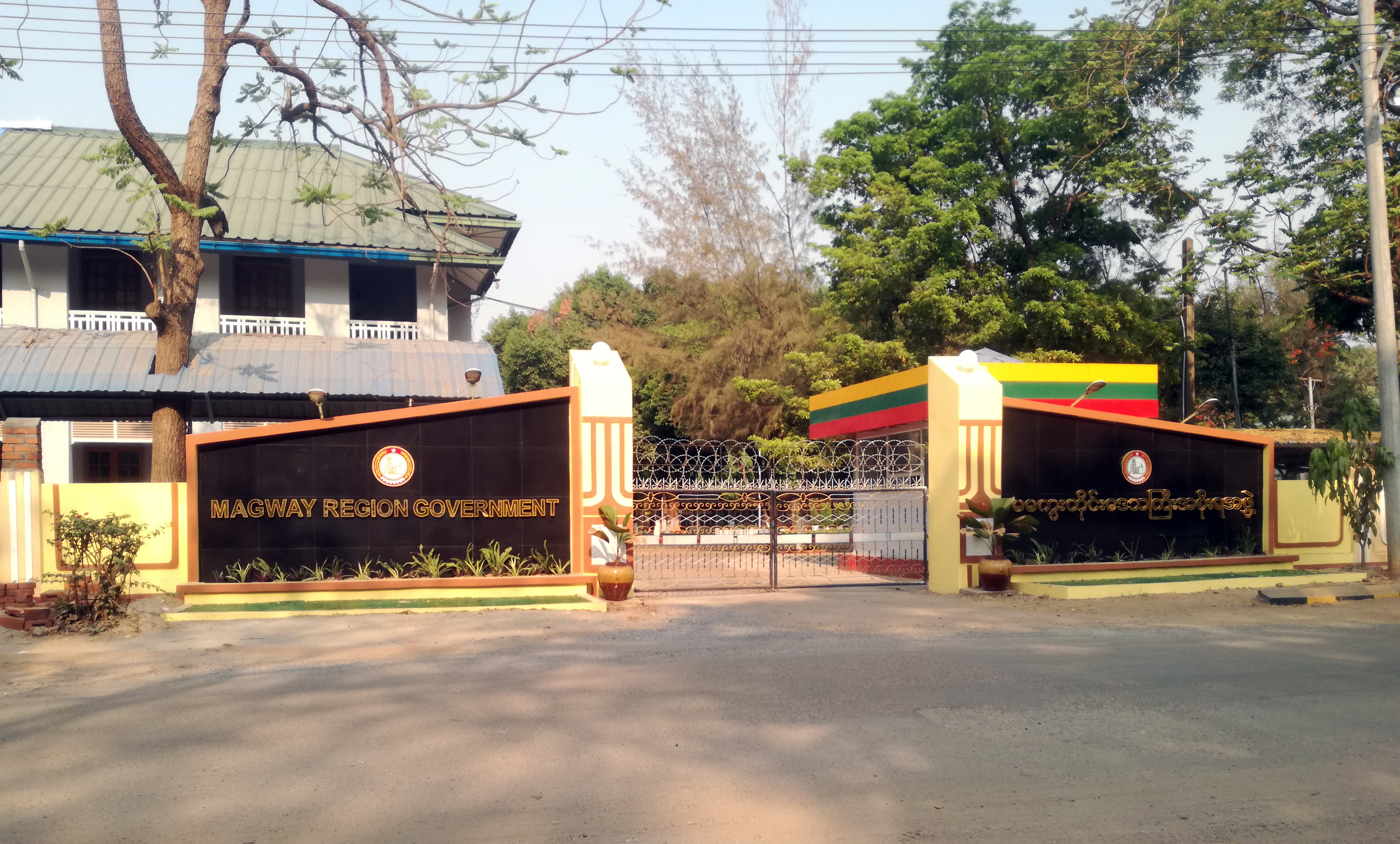
Magway Region

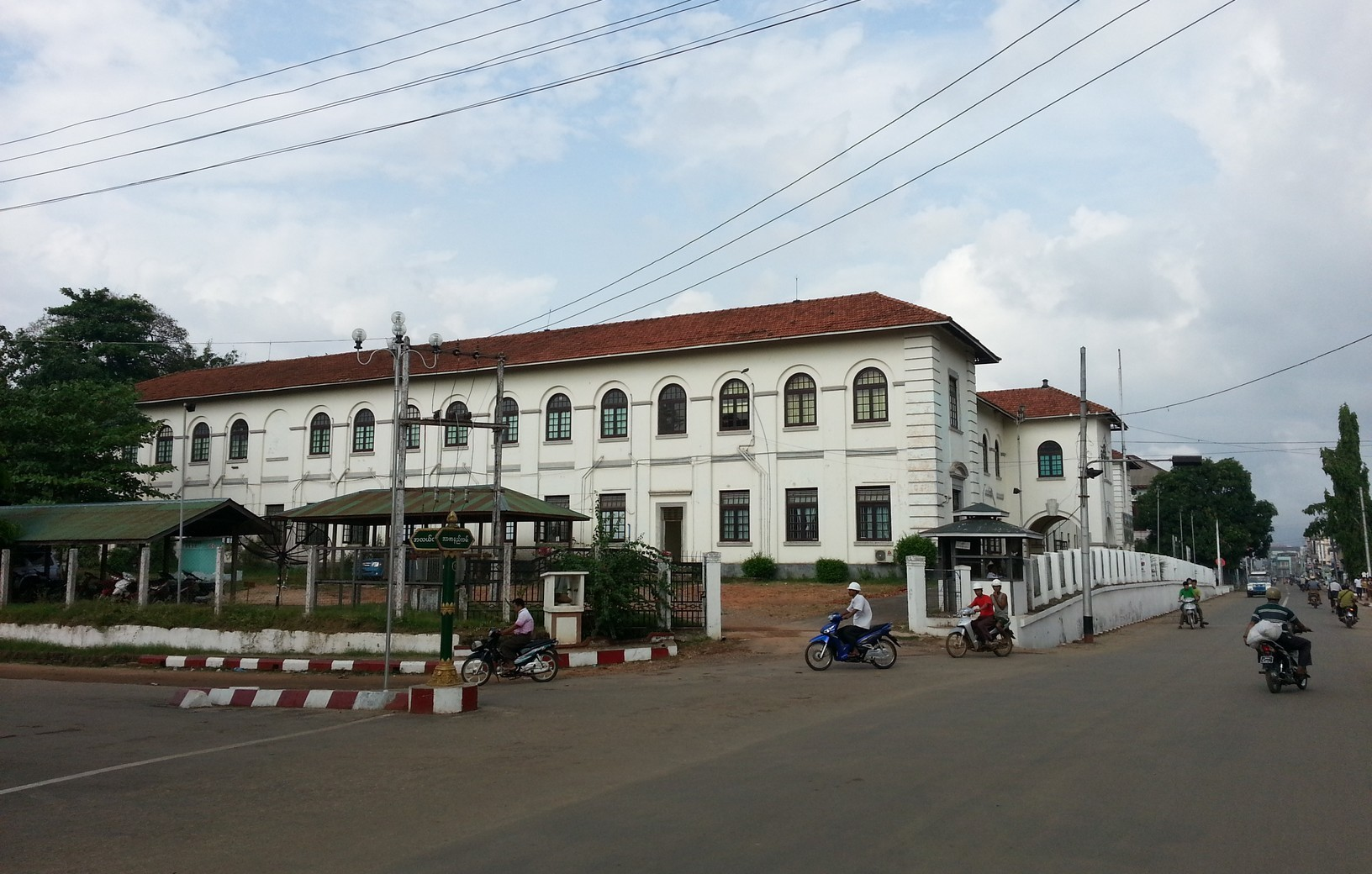
Tanintharyi Region

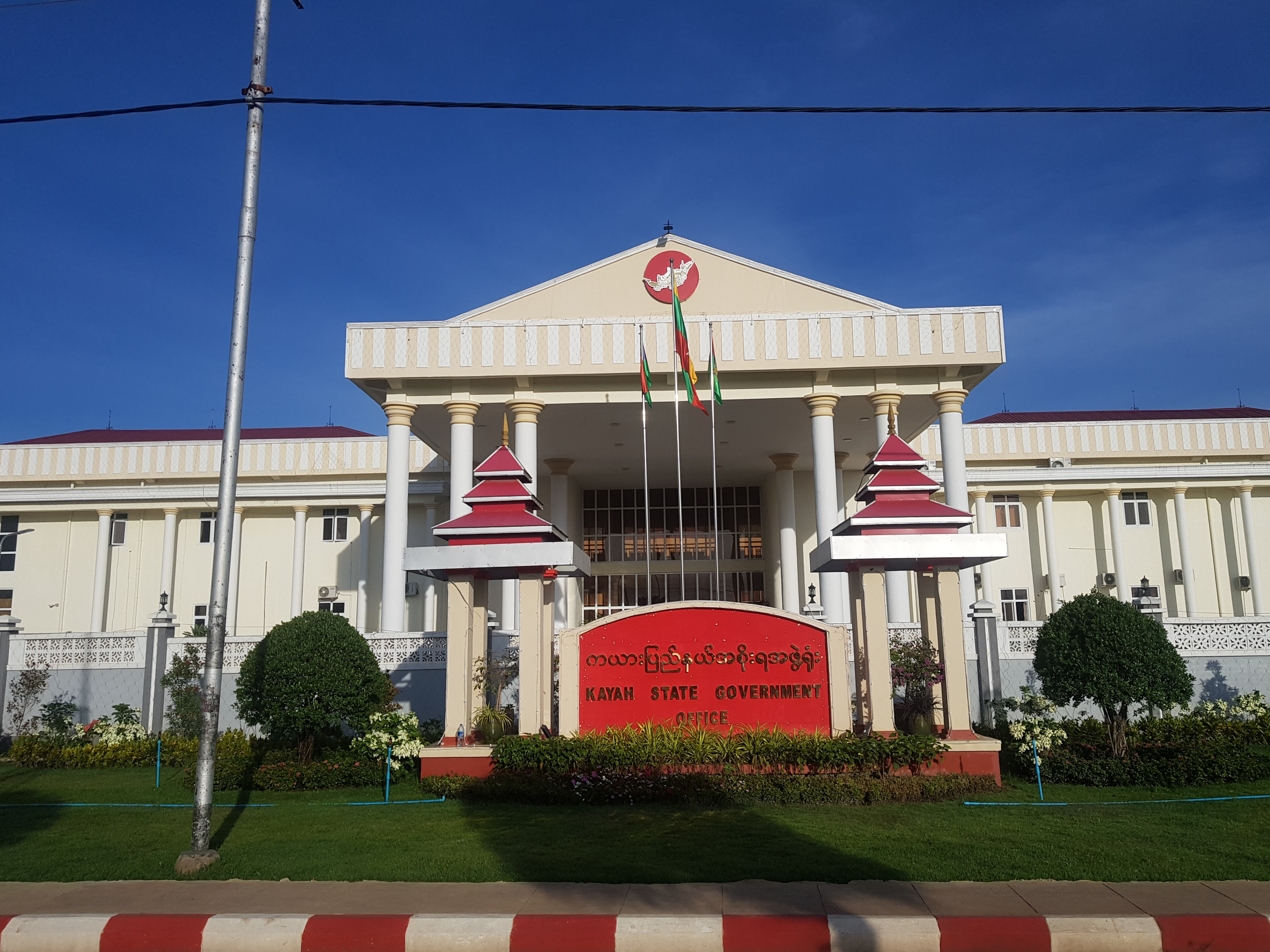
Kayah State

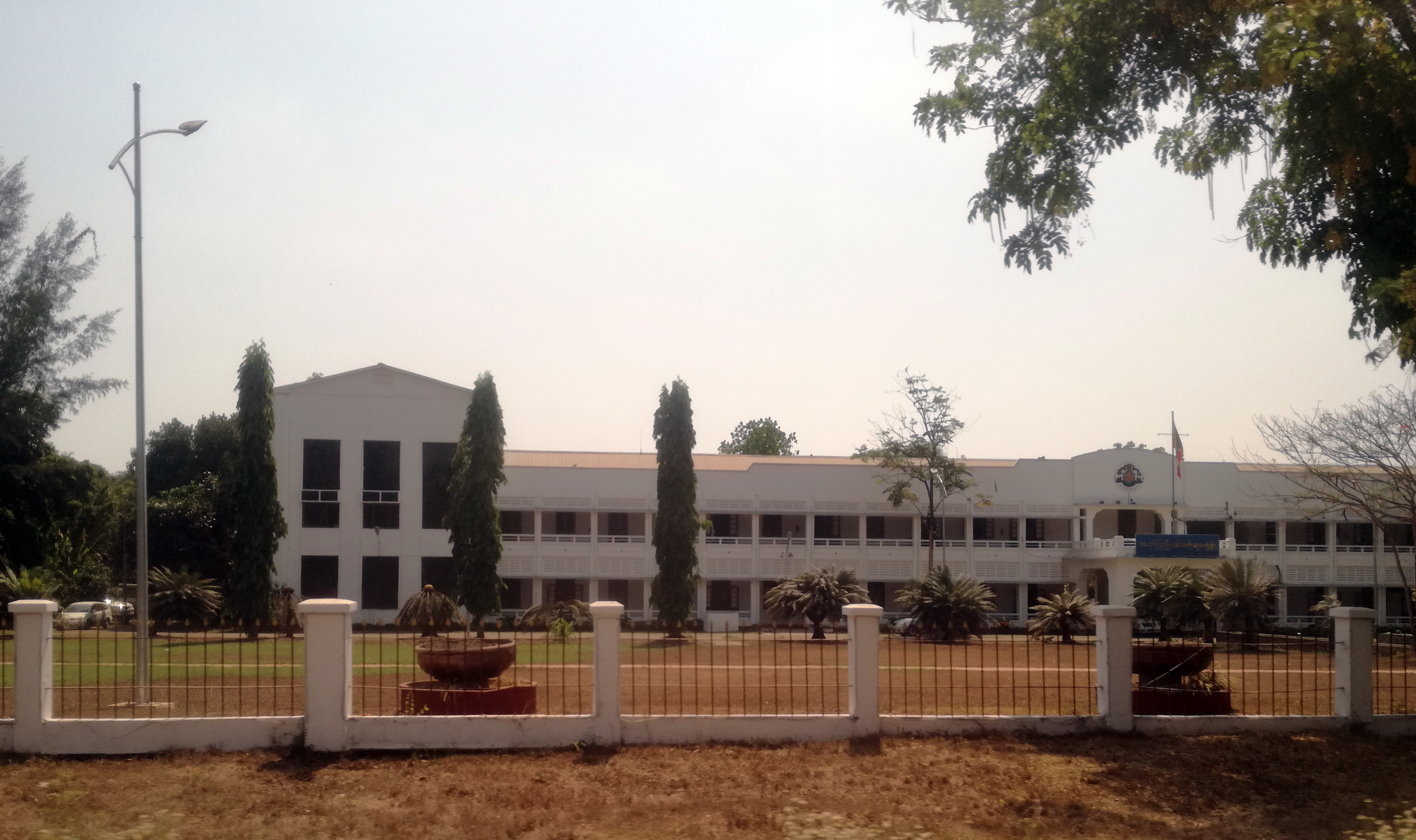
Kayin State

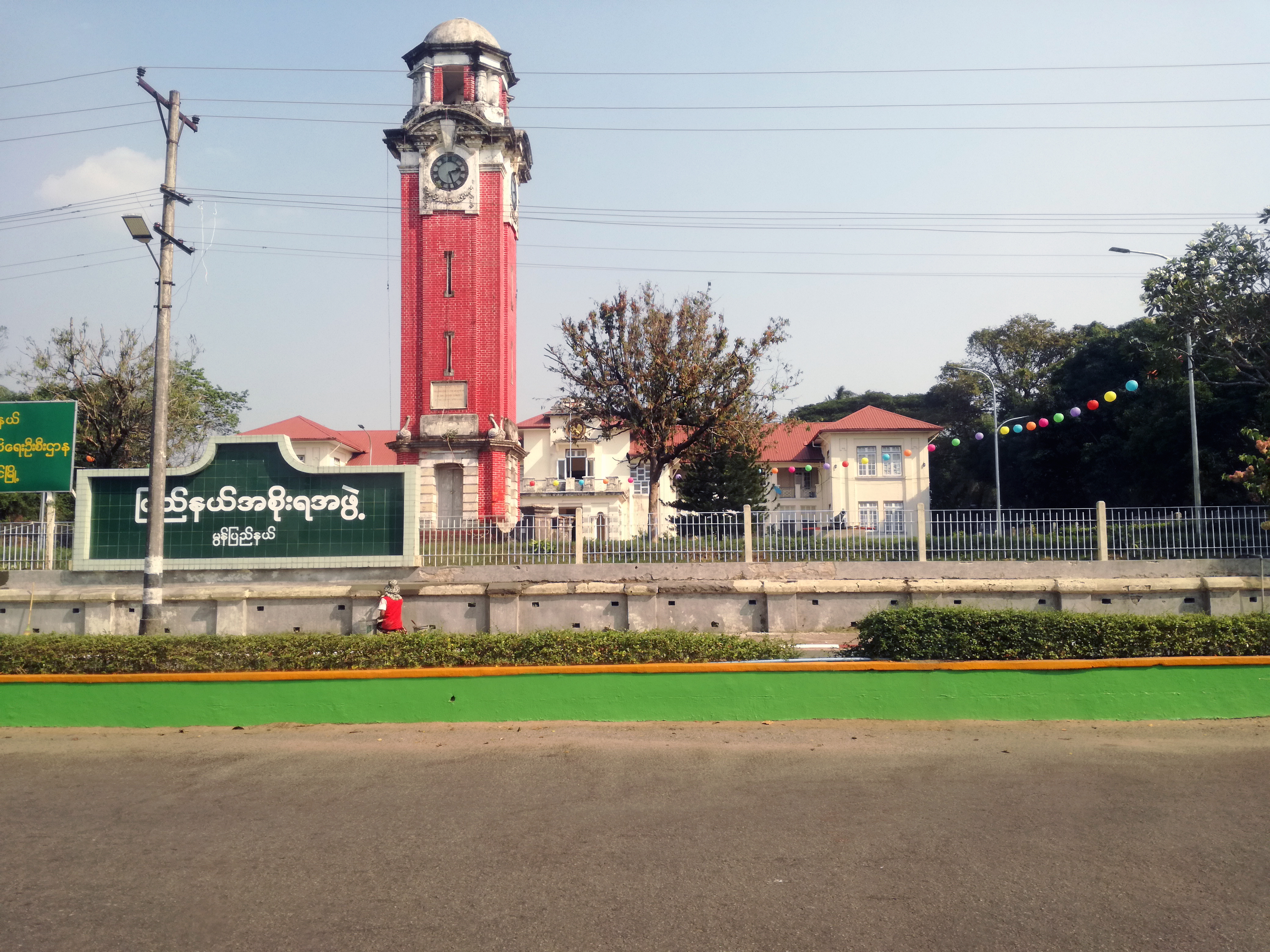
Mon State

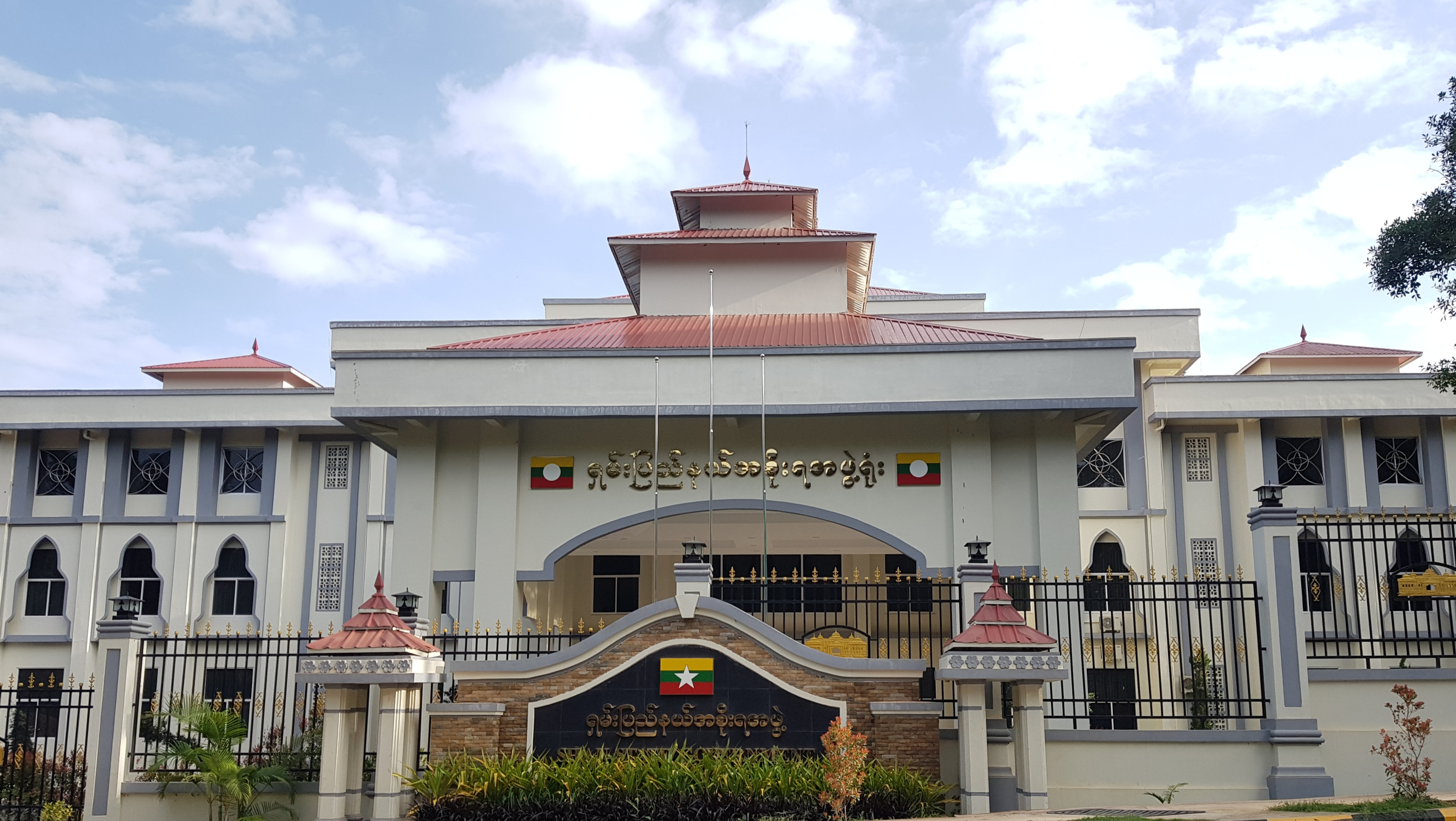
Shan State

== Cabinets ==
=== Regions ===
- Ayeyarwady Region Government
- Bago Region Government
- Magway Region Government
- Mandalay Region Government
- Sagaing Region Government
- Tanintharyi Region Government
- Yangon Region Government

=== States ===
- Kachin State Government
- Kayah State Government
- Kayin State Government
- Chin State Government
- Mon State Government
- Rakhine State Government
- Shan State Government

== Heads ==
The heads of the governments are chief ministers.

No	Name	Division
1	Phyo Min Thein	Yangon Region
2	Dr Zaw Myint Maung	Mandalay Region
3	Aung Moe Nyo	Magway Region
4	Dr Myint Naing	Sagaing Region
5	Win Thein	Bago Region
6	Hla Moe Aung	Ayeyarwady Region
7	Myint Maung	Tanintharyi Region
8	Dr Khat Aung	Kachin State
9	Boss Ko (acting)	Kayah State
10	Nan Khin Htwe Myint	Kayin State
11	Salai Lian Luai	Chin State
12	Aye Zan, Dr.	Mon State
13	Nyi Pu	Rakhine State
14	Dr Linn Htut	Shan State

== Logos ==
Mandalay Region

Yangon Region

Bago Region

Kachin State

Kayah State

Kayin State

Chin State

Mon State

Shan State

Tanintharyi Region

Ayeyarwady Region

Magway Region
