= Ye Myint =

- ရဲမြင့်

1st Chief Minister of Mandalay Region
- In office 30 March 2011 – 30 March 2016
- Preceded by: Office established
- Succeeded by: Zaw Myint Maung

Representative of Mandalay Region Hluttaw
- In office 30 March 2011 – 30 March 2016
- Preceded by: Office established
- Constituency: Pyinoolwin Township No. 2

Personal details
- Born: Burma
- Party: Union Solidarity and Development Party

Military service
- Branch/service: Myanmar Army
- Rank: Lieutenant general

Ye Myint (Burmese: ရဲမြင့်) was the chief minister of Mandalay Region, Myanmar, from 2011 to 2016. He is a former lieutenant general in the Myanmar Army and former chief of Military Affairs Security.

A member of the Union Solidarity and Development Party, he was elected to represent Pyinoolwin Township Constituency No. 2 as a Mandalay Region Hluttaw representative in the 2010 Burmese general election.

== Terrorist attack and fire ==
In January 2014, a convoy carrying Ye Myint and two other regional ministers was hit by a landmine explosion, at Naungcho, on the Mogok-Pyinoolwin highway, on the way back to Mandalay. On 19 April 2014, Ye Myint's Mandalay home caught fire, caused by an overheated surge protector connected to an air conditioning unit. On 22 April 2014, he was charged under Article 285 of the Myanmar Penal Code for negligence in a fire.
