= University of Traditional Medicine, Mandalay =

Burmese university

Coordinates: 22.0207°N 96.1011°E

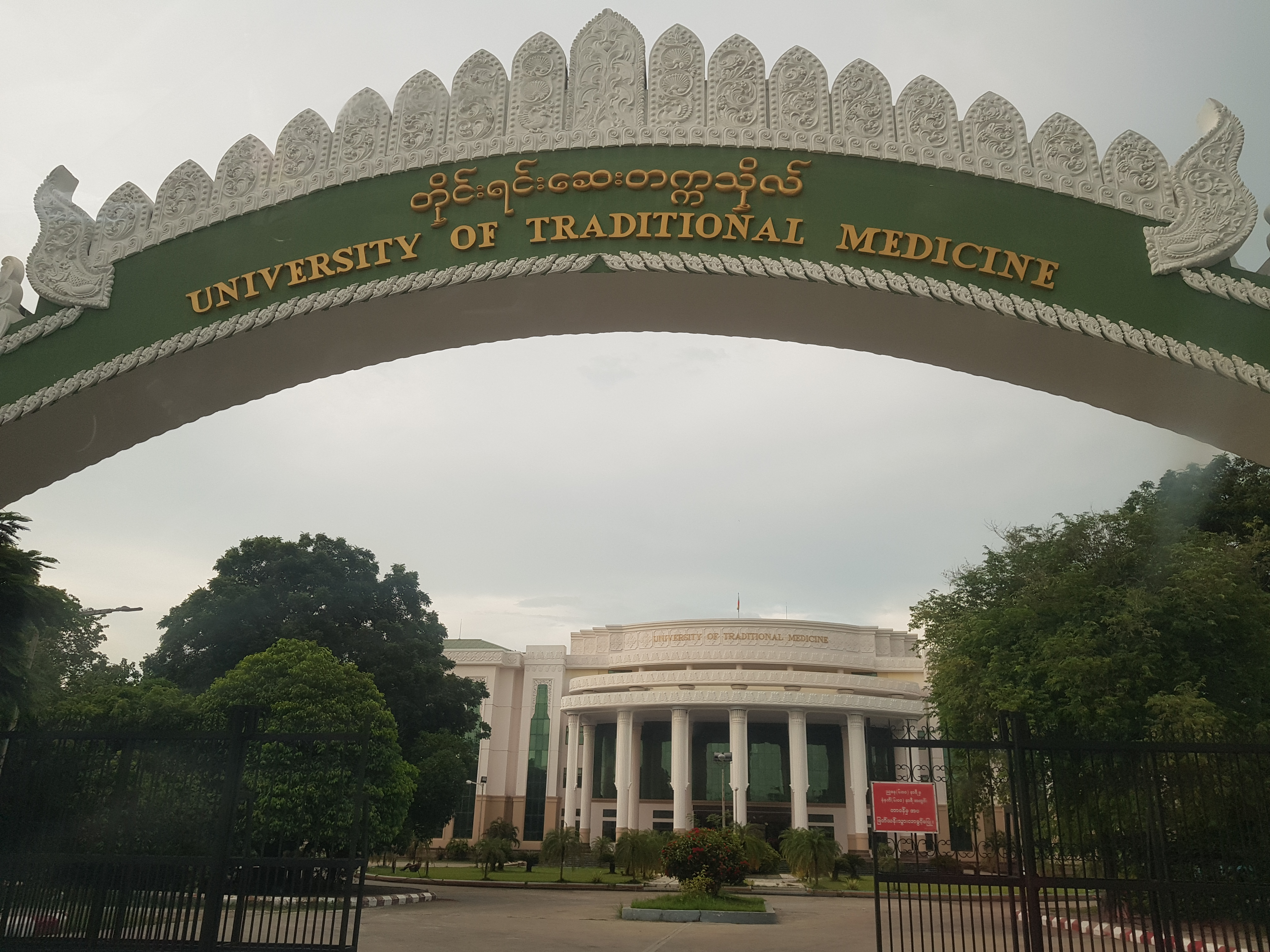
- Type: Public
- Established: 19 December 2001; 24 years ago1
- Affiliations: Ministry of Health
- Rector: Prof. Dr Thein Zaw Linn
- Undergraduates: 1875 (2026)
- Postgraduates: 133 (2026)
- Location: Aungmyethasan, Mandalay, Mandalay Division, Myanmar
- Campus: Urban

The University of Traditional Medicine, Mandalay (UTM), in Aungmyethazan, Mandalay, is a public university of Burmese traditional medicine in Myanmar. The Ministry of Health-administered university under the Department of Traditional Medicine offers a five-year Bachelor of Myanmar Traditional Medicine degree program and accepts about 150 students a year.

== History ==
UTM was established in 2002 Jan 9th on an 11.42-acre (6.98-acre) campus. Its present building complex was completed in 2004 December.

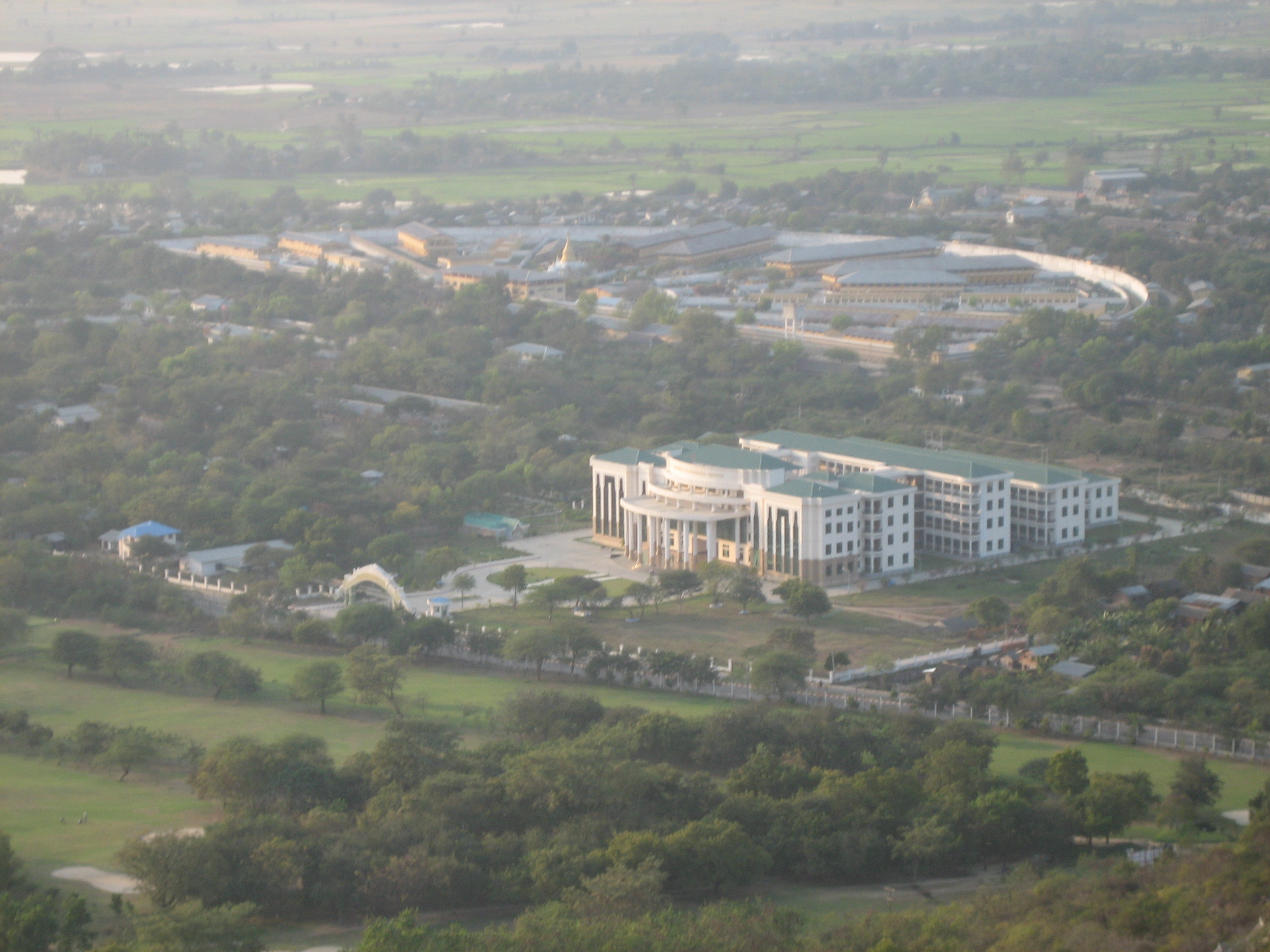

== Program ==
The university accepts about 150 students annually, based solely on their university entrance exam scores. The total enrollment is 602 for the 2008 academic year. The university offers a five-year program including a one-year internship and confers a BMTM (Bachelor of Myanmar Traditional Medicine) degree.

- First year: literature and basic science subjects such as Burmese, English, Pali and Sanskrit (Oriental Studies), botany, behavioral science and Pharmacology(TM), computer science, Digitalization and AI.
- Second year: Basic Medical Sciences (Western) subjects—anatomy, physiology, biochemistry, pathology and microbiology, and Basic Medical Science (Traditional) subjects—anatomy, physiology, pharmacology, medicinal plants, principles of traditional medicine, pharmacognosy, English and traditional clinical methods.
- Third year: Traditional clinical subjects such as internal medicine, gynecology, child health, ulcers and sores, physical medicine, orthopedics, panchakarma and Chinese acupuncture, and Western pharmacology, preventive and social medicine, Basic Herbal Research and clinical methods.
- Fourth year: Continuation of traditional clinical subjects plus additional subjects like research methodology and forensic medicine.
- Fifth year: Internship in Traditional Medicine Teaching Hospitals.
