= Maung Ko =

Member of SAC of Myanmar

Thiri Pyanchi Maung Ko မောင်ကို

Member of State Administration Council
- In office 1 February 2023 – 2 August 2023

3rd Chief Minister of Mandalay Region
- In office 1 August 2021 – 1 February 2023
- Preceded by: Himself (chairman of RAC)
- Succeeded by: Myo Aung

Chairman of Mandalay Region Administration Council
- In office 2 February 2021 – 1 August 2021
- Preceded by: Zaw Myint Maung (chief minister)
- Succeeded by: Himself (chief minister)

Personal details
- Awards: Thiri Pyanchi; Wunna Kyawhtin

Maung Ko is a former member of State Administration Council of Myanmar. He has also been a former chief minister of Mandalay Region. He has served as chairman of Mandalay Region Administration Council, sub-council of State Administration Council, from 2 February 2021 to 1 August 2021. He is also a patron of the Mandalay Region Chamber of Commerce and Industry (MRCCI).

== Political career ==
He was appointed the chairman of Mandalay Region Administration Council by SAC Chairman Min Aung Hlaing. On 1 August 2021, the State and Region Administration Councils were dissolved and the State and Region Governments were reformed. Maung Ko was appointed the head of Mandalay Region Government and became the 3rd Chief Minister of Mandalay Region.

== US sanctions ==
On 10 December 2021, the U.S. Department of the Treasury added Maung Ko to its Specially Designated Nationals (SDN) sanctions list. Individuals on the list have their assets blocked and U.S. citizens are generally prohibited from doing business with them.
