= Win Htein =

Burmese politician (born 1941)

- ဝင်းထိန်
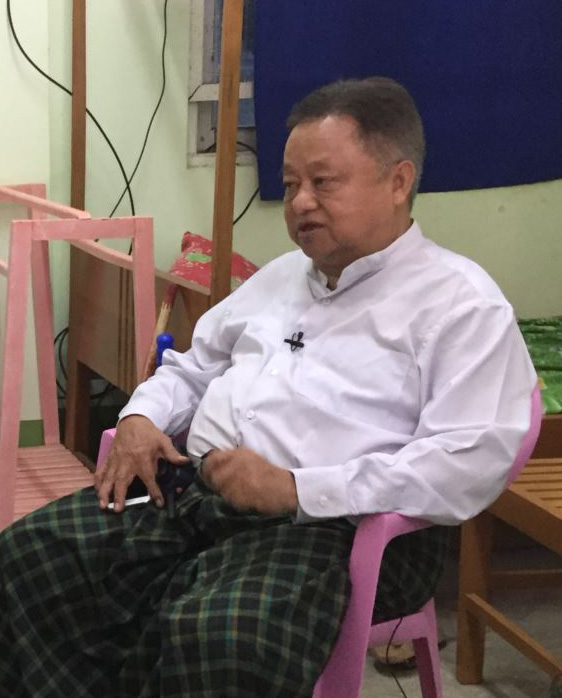
- Win Htein on 2015

Member of the Pyithu Hluttaw
- In office 2 May 2012 – 29 January 2016
- Preceded by: Thein Aung
- Succeeded by: Maung Thin
- Constituency: Meiktila Township

Personal details
- Born: 24 December 1941 (age 84) Sel Kone Village, Meiktila, Burma
- Party: National League for Democracy
- Spouse: Thein Myint Kyi
- Children: 4
- Education: Defence Services Academy, Rangoon Arts and Science University
- Occupation: Politician

Military service
- Allegiance: Myanmar
- Branch/service: Myanmar Army
- Years of service: 1959–1977
- Rank: Captain

Win Htein (Burmese: ဝင်းထိန် [wɪ́ɴ tʰèiɴ]) is a Burmese politician and former inmate who served as a Pyithu Hluttaw MP for Meiktila Township. He is a patron and member of the Central Executive Committee of National League for Democracy (NLD), for which he acts as official spokesperson. Win Htein is considered to be one of the closest confidantes of NLD chairperson Aung San Suu Kyi. On the morning of 5 February 2021, he was charged with sedition and moved to the capital of Naypyidaw On 29 October 2021, he was sentenced to 20 years in prison and he was transferred from a Naypyitaw detention centre to Obo Prison in Mandalay.

== Early life and career ==
Win Htein was born in Sel Kone Village, Meiktila, Mandalay Region, Burma to parents Hla Tun and Khin Su. He joined the Tatmadaw in 1959, graduating at the top of his class in 1963 from the fifth intake of the Defence Services Academy. Attaining the rank of captain, he participated in a number of counterinsurgency operations before taking a staff position at the Ministry of Defence. He was dismissed from the armed forces in 1977, apparently because of his association with former general and later National League for Democracy cofounder Tin Oo, and embarked on a new career as a businessman and consultant after he was awarded a science degree from Rangoon Arts and Science University.

== National League for Democracy and imprisonment ==
Following the 8888 Uprising in 1988, Tin Oo sought out Win Htein and asked him to join the National League for Democracy, where he was assigned to the personal staff of Aung San Suu Kyi. Along with dozens of other NLD members, he was arrested in July 1989, subjected to physical torture during interrogations and held in solitary confinement at Yangon's notorious Insein Prison.

Released in 1995 under a general amnesty for political prisoners, he was arrested again the following year and charged with "instructing" Maung Tin Hlaing, a bodyguard of Aung San Suu Kyi, to speak about the torture of political prisoners in Myanmar's jails during an interview with the Australian Broadcasting Corporation, and organising farmers to collect agricultural statistics. Released from Katha Prison in 2008, he was arrested again less than 24 hours later.

He was released from prison a third and final time on July 15, 2010.

== Parliamentary career ==
Win Htein was elected to the Pyithu Hluttaw seat of Meiktila Township, his hometown, to represent the NLD after the Myanmar by-elections in April 2012. He replaced Thein Aung, who vacated his seat to take the post of Deputy Minister for Industry in the government of President Thein Sein.

In March 2013, Meiktila was the site of anti-Muslim riots that left more than 40 people dead, including 32 teenage students at the Mingalar Zayone Islamic Boarding School. Win Htein, who attempted to intervene to stop the riots, later said the violence made him "ashamed to be from Meiktila", prompting anger from Buddhist constituents and a failed attempt to recall him from the Pyithu Hluttaw.

Win Htein did not recontest his seat in the 2015 election. He told the Financial Times he would focus on internal NLD party matters into the future, following the party's landslide election win.

On 29 October 2021, Win Htein was sentenced by the military junta to 20 years in prison in Mandalay's Obo Prison, purportedly for making remarks after the 2021 Myanmar coup d'état. He was found guilty of sedition, under Section 124(A) of the Myanmar Penal Code, which recently had been amended by the military junta shortly after his arrest to increase the maximum term from 3 years to 20 years, and expanded to “Defense Services or Defense Services Personnel.”

== Personal life ==
He married Thein Myint Kyi and the couple has two sons and two daughters.

Years in prison have taken a toll on the health of Win Htein. In 2014, he collapsed on the floor of parliament and requires an oxygen tank to sleep at night because of a chronic heart condition. A brief hospitalisation in February 2016 led to widely circulated and false rumours of his death.
