= Mandalay Central Prison =

Prison in Mandalay, Myanmar

- Interactive map of Mandalay Central Prison
- Location: Mandalay, Myanmar; 22°01′24″N 96°05′48″E
- Status: Active
- Capacity: 4,833
- Opened: 1992; 34 years ago
- Managed by: Ministry of Home Affairs

Mandalay Central Prison (Burmese: မန္တလေးဗဟိုအကျဉ်းထောင်), informally known as Obo Prison (အိုးဘိုအကျဉ်းထောင်), is a major prison located in Aungmyethazan Township, Mandalay, Myanmar (formerly Burma). The prison is adjacent to the Obo railway station, and located northeast of the city centre, at the foot of Mandalay Hill. The prison has a capacity of 4,833 inmates. Mandalay Central Prison has housed many prominent political prisoners, including Zaw Myint Maung, Ye Lwin, and Win Htein.

== History ==
King Mindon founded Mandalay in 1857 as the new royal capital of the Konbaung dynasty. It was Burma's last royal capital before the British Empire annexed the kingdom in 1885.

The picture of the prison was taken in 1903 by the Archaeological Survey of India under Lord Curzon, Viceroy of India from 1899 to 1905. In this prison, heavily-guarded Netaji Subhas Chandra Bose was brought on 25 January 1925, at midnight and spent almost three years there. Bose considered it as a privilege as Bal Gangadhar Tilak (imprisoned from 1907 to 1913), Lala Lajpat Rai who were imprisoned there once. The jail was located on the banks of the Irrawaddy River shown in the picture in the far background on the right.

A new prison was built in 1992 by the State Law and Order Restoration Council, the ruling military junta, to replace a pre-colonial jail inside Mandalay Palace, amid domestic unrest following the 8888 Uprising. The prison's half-spoke wheel design has been used as a reference model for subsequent prison designs in the country.

In April 2008, 5 inmates at the prison were charged with murder after Kyaw Myo Thu, an inmate was found dead in a jail cell. In the aftermath of the 2021 Myanmar coup d'état, Obo Prison has been used to house numerous political prisoners. In August 2022, several prisoners were shot for staging a hunger strike, in response to the high-profile execution of anti-coup political activists, including Kyaw Min Yu and Phyo Zeyar Thaw.

In March 2025, Mandalay was struck by the 2025 Myanmar earthquake. Obo Prison was severely damaged, and several buildings incurred significant structural damage. At least 64 inmates, including 41 political prisoners, were killed.

== Notable prisoners ==
- Zaw Myint Maung
- Ye Lwin
- Win Htein
- Subhas Chandra Bose
- Bal Gangadhar Tilak
- Lala Lajpat Rai
- Sardar Ajit Singh
