= Aungmyethazan Township =

Aungmyethazan Township အောင်မြေသာစံ မြို့နယ်
- Township
- Aungmyethazan Township
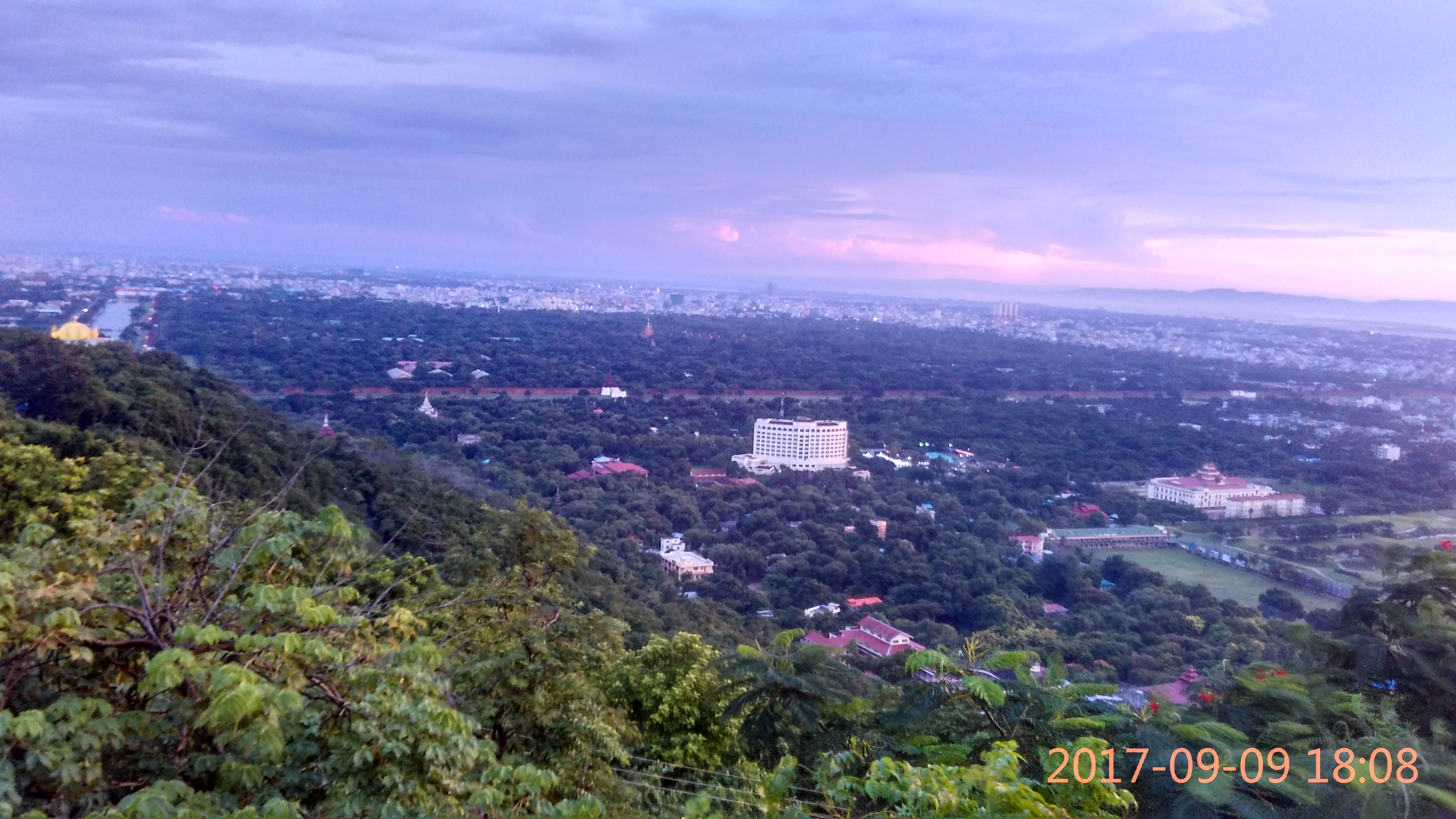

- Aungmyaythazan in Mandalay District

- Location within Myanmar
- Coordinates: 22°0′0.6″N 96°5′39.84″E
- Country: Myanmar
- Region: Mandalay
- City: Mandalay
- District: Aungmyethazan
- Time zone: UTC6:30 (MST)
- Area codes: 2 (mobile: 69, 90)

Aungmyethazan Township (also Aungmyethasan Township; Burmese: အောင်မြေသာစံ မြို့နယ် ) is the northernmost (and city centre core) township of Mandalay, Myanmar. The township is bounded by the Ayeyarwady river in the west, Patheingyi Township in the east, Chanayethazan Township in the south. Aungmyethazan is home to many of city's famous sites, including the Mandalay Palace and the Mandalay Hill.

== Notable places ==
- Atumashi Monastery
- Kuthodaw Pagoda
- Kyauktawgyi Buddha Temple
- Mandalay Hill
- Mandalay Palace
- Mandalay Workers' Hospital
- Nandawun Park
- Man Thida Park
- University of Traditional Medicine, Mandalay
- Yadanabon Zoological Gardens (Mandalay Zoo)
- Mandalay Central Prison
