= Zaw Myint Maung =

Burmese politician (1951–2024)

His Excellency Zaw Myint Maung
- ဇော်မြင့်မောင်
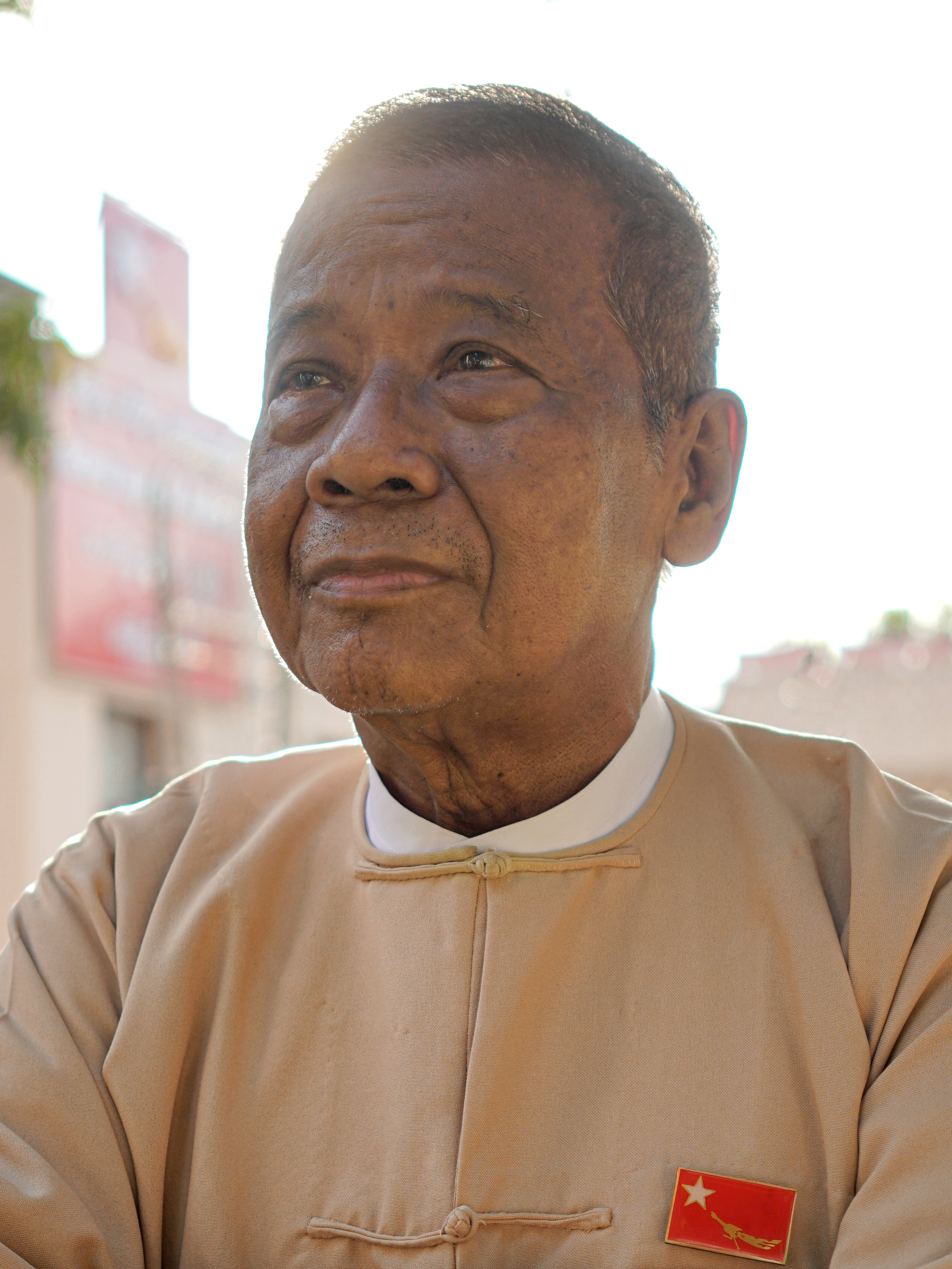
- Maung in 2020

2nd Chief Minister of the Mandalay Region
- In office 30 March 2016 – 1 February 2021
- Preceded by: Ye Myint
- Succeeded by: Maung Ko (chairman of RAC)

Member of the Mandalay Region Hluttaw
- In office 8 February 2016 – 31 January 2021
- Constituency: Amarapura Township № 1

Member of the Pyithu Hluttaw
- In office 2 May 2012 – 29 January 2016
- Preceded by: Hla Tun
- Succeeded by: Shwe Ko
- Constituency: Kyaukpadaung Township

Member-elect of the Pyithu Hluttaw
- Preceded by: Constituency established
- Succeeded by: Constituency abolished
- Constituency: Amarapura Township No. 1
- Majority: 21,119 (66%)

Personal details
- Born: 11 December 1951 Amarapura, Burma
- Died: 7 October 2024 (aged 72) Mandalay, Myanmar
- Party: National League for Democracy (Vice-president of the party)
- Relations: Chit Maung (father)
- Education: Mandalay Institute of Medicine
- Occupation: Politician, physician

Zaw Myint Maung (Burmese: ဇော်မြင့်မောင်; 11 December 1951 – 7 October 2024) was a Burmese politician, physician and political prisoner who served as Chief Minister of Mandalay Region and Mandalay Region MP for Amarapura Township.

== Early life and education ==
Zaw Myint Maung graduated with a medical degree from the Institute of Medicine, Mandalay, in 1979. During his medical career, he worked in Sagaing Division's Yuthitgyi Hospital and served as a demonstrator in the biochemistry department at the University of Medicine, Mandalay, formerly known as the Institute of Medicine, Mandalay from 1983 to 1988.

== Political career ==
In the 1990 Burmese general election, Maung was elected as a Pyithu Hluttaw MP, winning 21,119 votes (66% of the total cast), but was never allowed to assume his seat.

On 22 November 1990, Maung was arrested under Article 122 of the Myanmar Penal Code and sentenced to 25 years for attending meetings on forming a provisional government. In March 1996, he was sentenced to a further seven years under the 1950 Emergency Provision Act for publishing a magazine celebrating the 75th anniversary of Rangoon University and another called New Blood Wave. In total, he served a 19-year sentence at a prison in Myitkyina. He was released on 21 February 2009. He was the vice-president of the National League for Democracy and acting president of the party.

In the wake of the 2021 Myanmar coup d'état on 1 February, Zaw Myint Maung was detained by the Myanmar Armed Forces. Authorities charged him with corruption, incitement and violating COVID restrictions. Zaw Myint Maung, who had been diagnosed with leukemia in 2019, was imprisoned at Obo Prison in Mandalay.

== Death and funeral ==
Maung died from leukemia at Mandalay General Hospital, on 7 October 2024, at the age of 72.

On 6 October 2024, the day before his death, a statement was released announcing that the military council had granted a full pardon for all the charges for which he had been imprisoned. On the morning of 8 October, at 10 a.m., Zaw Myint Maung's body was taken from his home in Pyigyidagun Township, Mandalay, to the Taung-Inn-Myaung-Inn cemetery for burial. Tens of thousands of locals, with nearly the entire town in attendance, joined the funeral procession. The military council restricted access to the cemetery, permitting only family members and close relatives inside. It is reported that Zaw Myint Maung's funeral was the most significant and crowded in Mandalay, after the grand funeral of Shwe Man Tin Maung.
