= Mandalay Region Hluttaw =

Regional legislature of Mandalay Region

Mandalay Region Hluttaw မန္တလေးတိုင်းဒေသကြီးလွှတ်တော်
- 2nd Mandalay Region Hluttaw

Type
- Type: Unicameral

History
- Founded: 8 February 2016

Leadership
- Speaker: Aung Kyaw Oo, NLD since 8 February 2016
- Deputy Speaker: Khin Maung Htay, NLD since 8 February 2016

Structure
- Seats: 76; 57 elected MPs; 19 military appointees
- Political groups: National League for Democracy (48)* Military (19); Union Solidarity and Development Party (8) Democratic Party (1)

Elections
- Last election: 8 November 2015

Meeting place
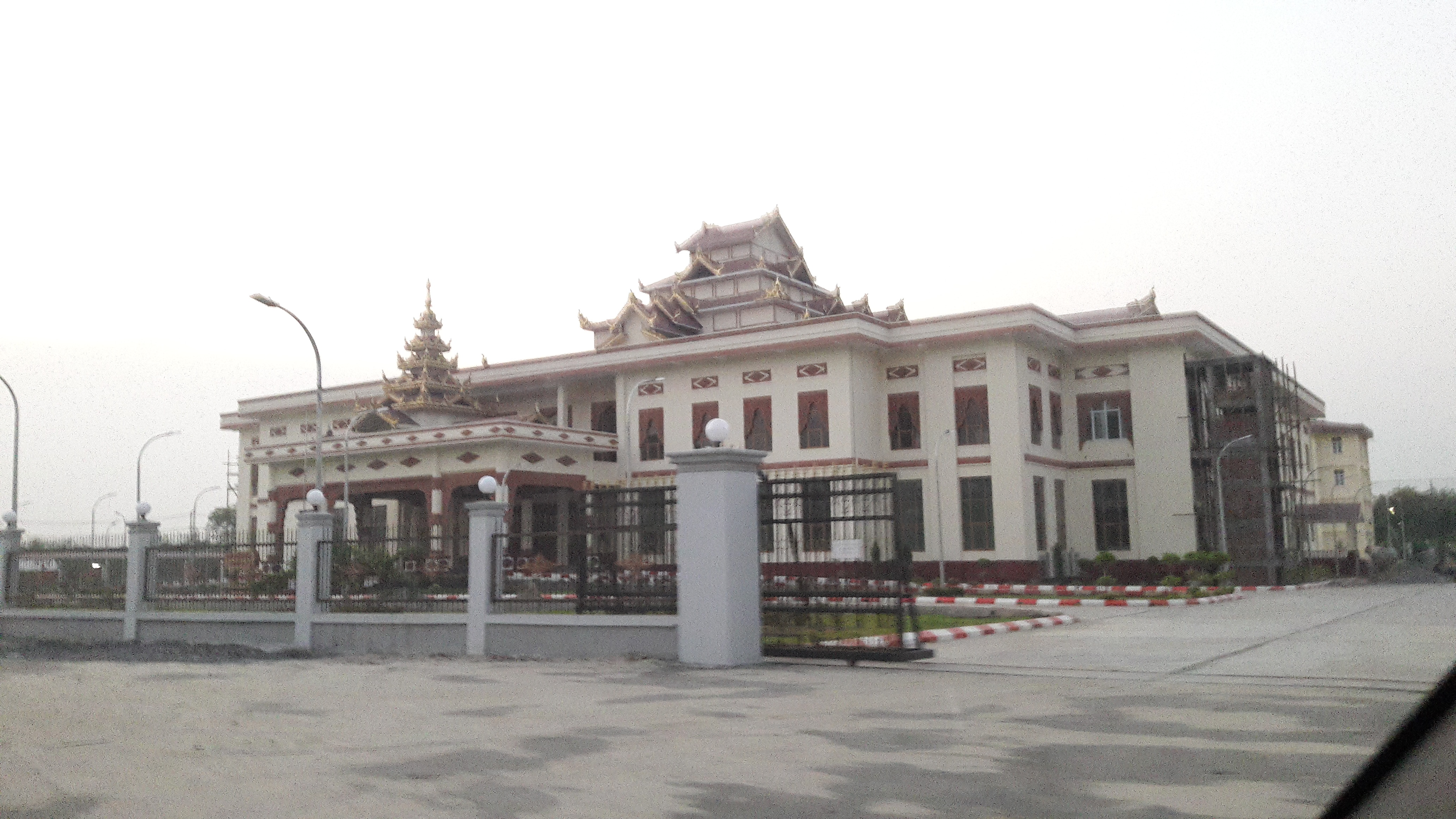
- Region Hluttaw Meeting Hall; Mandalay, Mandalay Region

Website
- mandalayregion.hluttaw.mm

Footnotes
- Includes one 'Ethnic Minister (Shan)' from the NLD.

Mandalay Region Hluttaw (Burmese: မန္တလေးတိုင်းဒေသကြီးလွှတ်တော်; lit. 'Mandalay Region Assembly') is the legislature of the Mandalay Region in Myanmar (Burma). It is a unicameral body, consisting of 76 members, including 57 elected members and 19 military representatives. As of February 2016, the Hluttaw was led by speaker Aung Kyaw Oo of the National League for Democracy (NLD).

As of the 2015 general election, the NLD won the most contested seats (48 out of 57) in the legislature, based on the most recent election results.

== General Election results (Nov. 2015) ==
Party	Seats	+/–
National League for Democracy (NLD)	48	▲48
Union Solidarity and Development Party (USDP)	8	▼47
Democratic Party (DPM)	1	Steady
Shan Nationalities League for Democracy (SNLD)	0	▼1
Military appointed	19	
Total	76	

== See also ==
- State and Region Hluttaws
- Pyidaungsu Hluttaw
- Amyotha Hluttaw
- Pyithu Hluttaw
