= Yegyibauk =

- Village
- Location in Burma
- Coordinates: 21°51′N 96°3′E
- Country: Burma
- Region: Mandalay Region
- District: Mandalay District
- Township: Amarapura Township
- Time zone: UTC+6.30 (MST)

Yegyibauk is a river village on the Myitnge River in Amarapura Township, Mandalay District, in the Mandalay Region of central Burma. It is located just to the southwest of Myitnge. The village was mentioned in the Agricultural Journal of India by the Indian Council of Agricultural Research in 1914.
