= Maha Aungmye District =

Maha Aungmye District မဟာအောင်မြေခရိုင်
- District
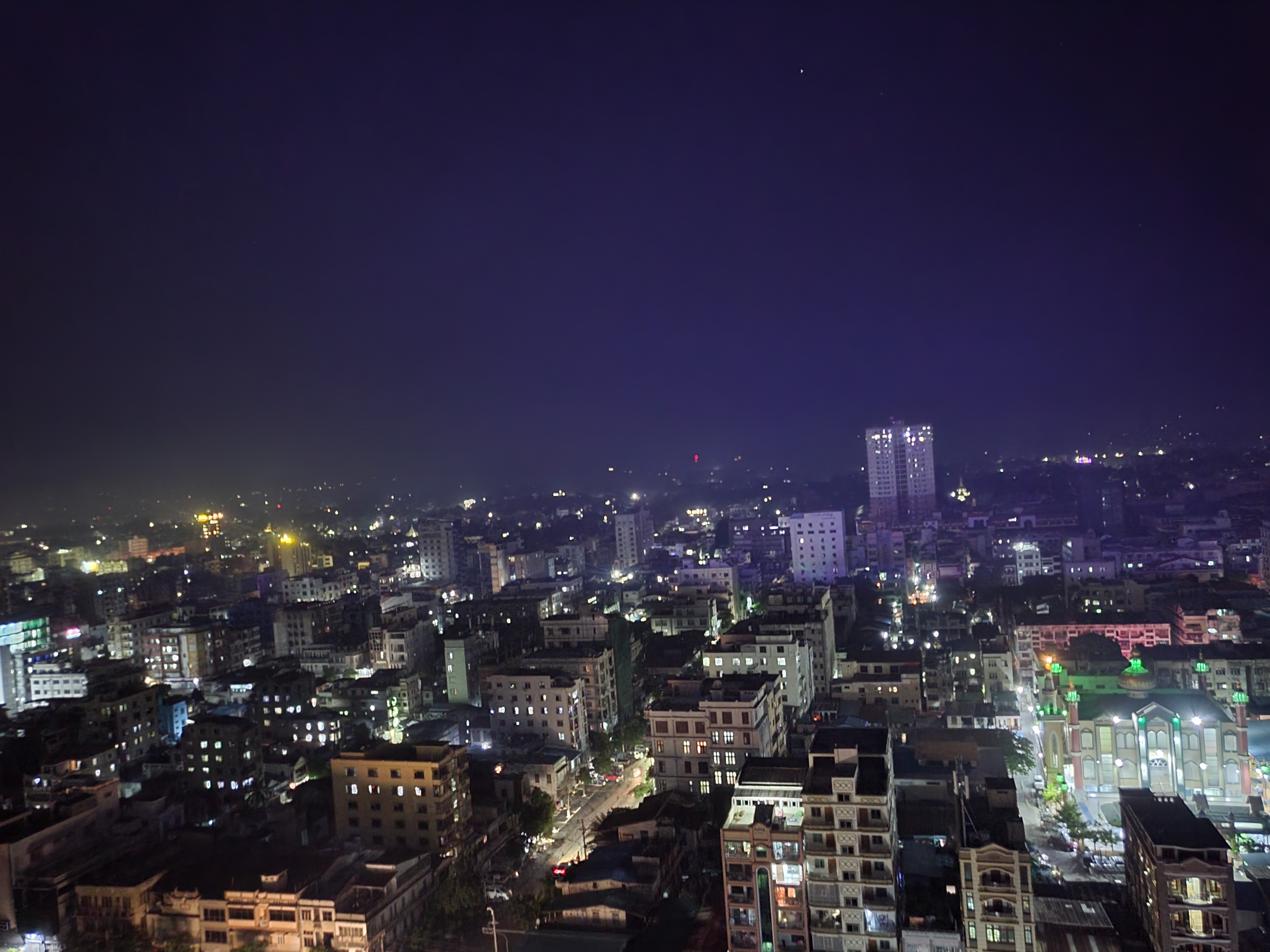
- Cityspace View

- location in Mandalay region

- Location in Burma
- Coordinates: 21°58′0″N 96°06′0″E
- Country: Myanmar
- Region: Mandalay
- Time zone: UTC6:30 (MST)

Maha Aungmye District (Burmese: မဟာအောင်မြေ ခရိုင်) is the district of Mandalay Region, Myanmar. It is included under Mandalay City Development Committee and Mandalay. Its principal township is Maha Aungmye.

== Townships ==
Townships of Maha Aungmye District Maha Aungmye Township Chanayethazan Township Chanmyathazi Township Pyigyidagun Township

The townships, cities, towns that are included in Maha Aungmye District are as follows:

- Maha Aungmye Township
- Chanayethazan Township
- Chanmyathazi Township
- Pyigyidagun Township

== History ==
On April 30, 2022, new districts were expanded and organized. Maha Aungmye, Chanayethazan, Chanmyathazi and Pyigyidagun Townships from Mandalay District were formed as Maha Aungmye District.
