= Sado, Amarapura =

Sado Sartoe
- Village
- Location in Burma
- Coordinates: 21°50′N 96°5′E
- Country: Burma
- Region: Mandalay Region
- District: Mandalay District
- Township: Amarapura Township
- Time zone: UTC+6.30 (MST)

Sado or Sartoe is a river village on the Myitnge River in Amarapura Township, Mandalay District, in the Mandalay Region of central Burma. It is located just to the southeast of Myitnge.

== History ==
During World War II, on March 18, 1944, the Indian 19th Infantry Division, 4th Brigade passed through Sado in which they reportedly faced opposition before later capturing Amarapura and Mandalay.

In campaigning for the 2010 elections in Burma, Democratic Party executive secretary Daw Than Than Nu visited the village in late October 2010 in which she said about the villagers, “What they mostly want from the government is good education for their children and good healthcare for every citizen.”
