= Leiksandin =

- Village
- Location in Burma
- Coordinates: 21°48′15″N 96°0′14″E
- Country: Burma
- Region: Mandalay Region
- District: Mandalay District
- Township: Amarapura Township

Population (1891)
  - Total: 310
- Time zone: UTC+6.30 (MST)

Leiksandin is a village in Amarapura Township, Mandalay District, in the Mandalay Region of central Burma.It is located 8 miles south of Amarapura and had a population of 310 in 1891 and was reported to have paid RS. 390 in thathameda tax.
