= Cannabis in Myanmar =

- Location of Myanmar (dark green)
- Medicinal: Illegal
- Recreational: Illegal

Cannabis in Myanmar (Burma) is illegal but cultivated illicitly. The cannabis plant is considered a narcotic drug under Myanmar law. Historically, cannabis has been used in Myanmar for clothing and traditional medicine.

== History ==
Although less widespread than opium, cannabis was prevalent in precolonial Myanmar.

During British rule in Burma, the import of hemp drugs to Burma by sea was prohibited in 1874. Cannabis was banned in 1891. Despite the ban, there was a high demand for cannabis, particularly among Indian workers in the country. Recognizing this ongoing demand, the Burmese government legalized and taxed cannabis in 1939. This move was primarily aimed at regulating the sale and consumption of the drug and generating revenue for the government.

The legalization of cannabis in Myanmar led to the establishment of government-run dispensaries that sold the drug to users. The dispensaries were established in major cities like Yangon and Mandalay. However, the dispensaries faced several challenges, including poor quality of cannabis and corruption among government officials. As a result, the demand for cannabis continued to be met through the black market.

In April 2019, authorities raided a 20-acre hemp plantation in Nganzun Township, leading to the arrest of its owner, American businessman John Todoroki, along with two Burmese nationals. Todoroki’s attorney stated that their intention was to conduct research rather than to sell or distribute the crop. Todoroki was released on bail in July 2019 due to respiratory issues. Shunlei Myat Noe, a translator at the farm, was freed after a court ruled that she held no responsibility for the farm’s operations. In February 2020, after failing to appear in court, the Myingyan District Court issued an arrest warrant for John Todoroki. If arrested, Todoroki could face 5-15 years in prison. In March 2020, the second employee, Shein Latt, was sentenced to 20 years in prison for violating Myanmar's drug laws.

Since the 2021 Myanmar coup d'état, the country has faced significant challenges related to drug trafficking, and the weak rule of law has led to increased cultivation and export of cannabis. The government has taken steps to combat drug trafficking, including the destruction of cannabis fields and the arrest of drug traffickers. However, the problem persists, and the country continues to struggle with drug use and addiction.

== Legal status ==
Cannabis is illegal in Myanmar. The country's Narcotic Drugs and Psychotropic Substances Law lists the cannabis plant as a narcotic drug, with no distinction made between non-intoxicating hemp. The penalty for marijuana possession is disputed across various sources, but according to the Transnational Institute, the cultivation of cannabis is made punishable with a minimum sentence of five years imprisonment.

== Cultivation ==
Cannabis is reported to be grown in Shan, Kachin, Sagaing, Magway, Mandalay and Ayeyarwady Region. Cannabis has been found growing spontaneously in northern Myanmar at elevations up to 3,000 metres (9,800 ft) above sea level. Cannabis is also cultivated in regions of Bangladesh that directly abut Myanmar, which might contribute to its spread within the country.

== Usage ==
According to official reports, cannabis is the fourth most commonly used substance in Myanmar, behind methamphetamines, opium and heroin. (Note: 1. Heroin; 2. Opium; 3. Methamphetamines; 4. Cannabis) A 2021 study found that cannabis was the third most commonly used substance among adults in Yangon Region, behind heroin and amphetamines.

The Rawang people, who live in northern Kachin State, traditionally dress toddlers in hemp-based clothing, believing it will bring good health. The Palaung people (also known as Ta'ang) traditionally made clothing and bags out of hemp. Buds, roots and seeds from cannabis plants are used as traditional medicine in Kachin State.

== See also ==
- Opium production in Myanmar
- Palaung traditional costume
