= Thingaza Monastery =

Buddhist monastery in Mandalay, Myanmar

Monastery
- မဟာမင်းထင်ကျောင်း
- Location within Myanmar

Religion
- Affiliation: Theravada Buddhism

Location
- Country: Mandalay, Mandalay Region, Burma
- Interactive map of Monastery
- Coordinates: 21.973234°N 96.062698°E

Architecture
- Founder: Mindon Min
- Completed: 1861; 165 years ago

Thingaza Monastery (Burmese: သင်္ဂဇာကျောင်း) is a historic Buddhist monastery in Chanmyathazi Township, Mandalay, Burma. The monastery was established donated by King Mindon Min to the Thingaza Sayadaw in 1861. Thingaza Monastery is listed among the buildings being maintained by the Department of Archaeology. The monastery, built with 232 teak pillars, includes a shrine hall, a donation hall, and a zetawun hall.

== See also ==
- Kyaung
