= Mandalay District =

Former district of Mandalay Region in Myanmar

Mandalay District မန္တလေး ခရိုင်
- District of Mandalay Region
- Mandalay District
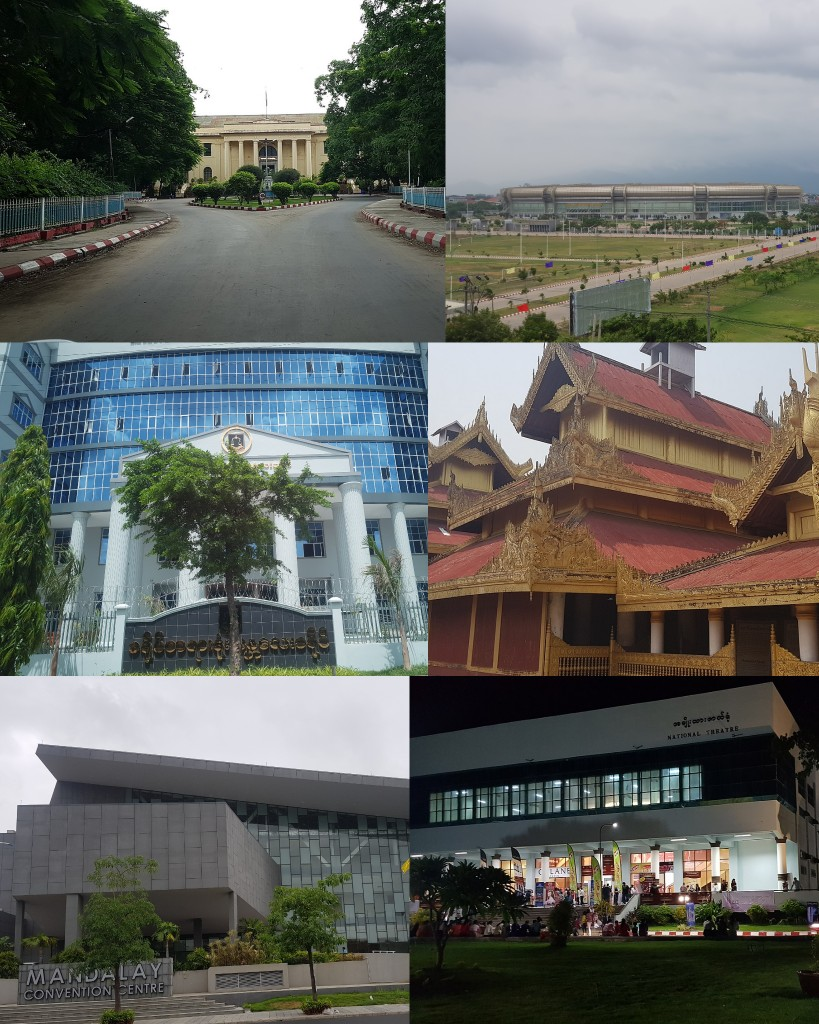
- Left: Mandalay University, Mandalay District Court, Mandalay Convention Center, Right: Mandalay Thiri Stadium, Mandalay Palace, Mandalay National Theater (all item from above to bottom)

- Mandalay district in Mandalay region

- Location in Burma
- Coordinates: 21°58′0″N 96°05′0″E
- Country: Myanmar
- Region: Mandalay Region
- Time zone: UTC6:30 (MST)
- Area codes: 2 (mobile: 69, 90)

Mandalay District (Burmese: မန္တလေး ခရိုင်) was a district of the Mandalay Region in central Myanmar. Though the district used to consist of two cities, Mandalay and Amarapura, today, with the urban sprawl of Mandalay capturing Amarapura and Patheingyi, the district and the city of Mandalay are one and the same. The district was dissolved and formed as Aungmyethazan District, Maha Aungmye District and Amarapura District on 30 April 2022.

== Townships ==
Townships of Mandalay district

Aungmyaythazan
Amarapura
Chanayethazan
Chanmyathazi
Mahaaungmyay
Patheingyi
Pyigyidagun

Mandalay District consists of the following townships and towns.

- Aungmyethazan Township
- Chanayethazan Township
- Chanmyathazi Township
- Maha Aungmye Township
- Pyigyidagun Township
- Amarapura Township
  - Amarapura
  - Myitnge
- Patheingyi Township
  - Patheingyi
