= Kandawgyi Gardens =

Kandawgyi Gardens or Kandawgyi Park may refer to:

- Kandawgyi Gardens, Mandalay, Myanmar
- National Kandawgyi Botanical Gardens, Pyin Oo Lwin, Myanmar
- Kandawgyi Nature Park, Yangon, Myanmar
