= 茶渡 =

茶渡, meaning 'tea, ferry', may refer to:

- Chado Horii (堀井 茶渡; born 1984), Japanese actor who cast in many anime television series, such as HeartCatch PreCure! and Welcome to the Ballroom, etc.
- Yasutora Sado (茶渡 泰虎), fictional character in Japanese manga and anime series Bleach

== See also ==
- Chado, Japanese cultural activity
- Hori (disambiguation)
- Sado (disambiguation)
