= Sado =

Sado can refer to:

== Places ==
=== Asia ===
- Sado Island, an island (佐渡島 Sadogashima) of Japan
  - Sado, Niigata, a city (佐渡市 Sado-shi) of Niigata Prefecture, Japan
  - Sado province (佐渡国 Sado no kuni), a former province of Japan located on the island
- Sado, Amarapura, Burma

=== Europe ===
- Sado (river), a major river in Portugal
- Sado, Setúbal, a parish in the municipality of Setúbal, Portugal

=== Africa ===
- Sado, Benin

== People ==
- Prince Sado, a Joseon Korean crown prince who never acceded
- Yutaka Sado, a Japanese conductor

== Other ==
- Sado (film), a 2015 South Korean film
- Japanese tea ceremony (茶道 Sadō)
- Sado 550, a microcar built in Portugal
- Datsun Sado, a utility vehicle built in Portugal
- Sado, a short story by Osamu Dazai
- Yasutora Sado, a fictional character in the anime and manga series Bleach
- Sadomasochism
