= Tada-U =

Tada-U တံတားဦးမြို့
- Town
- Location in Myanmar
- Coordinates: 21°48′N 95°58′E
- Country: Myanmar
- Region: Mandalay Region
- District: Tada-U District
- Townships: Tada-U Township
- Seat: Tada-U
- Time zone: UTC+6.30 (MMT)

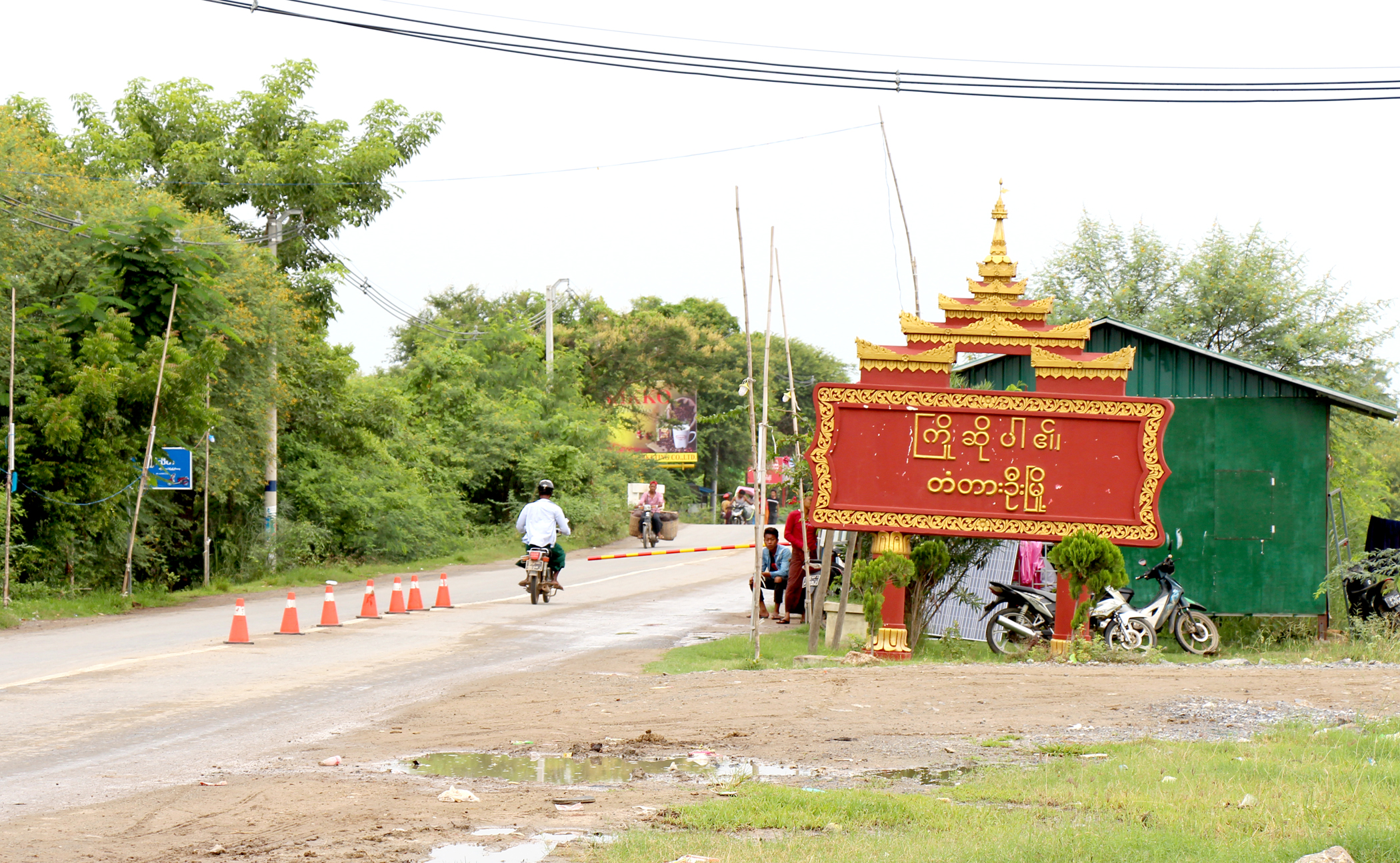
Street of Tada-U

Tada-U (တံတားဦးမြို့) is a town in central Myanmar about 10 km (6.2 mi) from the provincial capital of Mandalay and is the principal town of Tada-U Township and Tada-U District.

There is an air force base located in the town.

== Transport ==
Tada U is also served by a branch line of the Myanmar Railways built in 1994. Tada Oo- Myotha Railway Line ends in Pyithayar Station (Gwaykone) south of the town.

== See also ==
- Transport in Burma
- Tada-U Township
