= Nganzun =

Nganzun ငါန်းဇွန်မြို့ Ngazun, Ngansoon
- Town
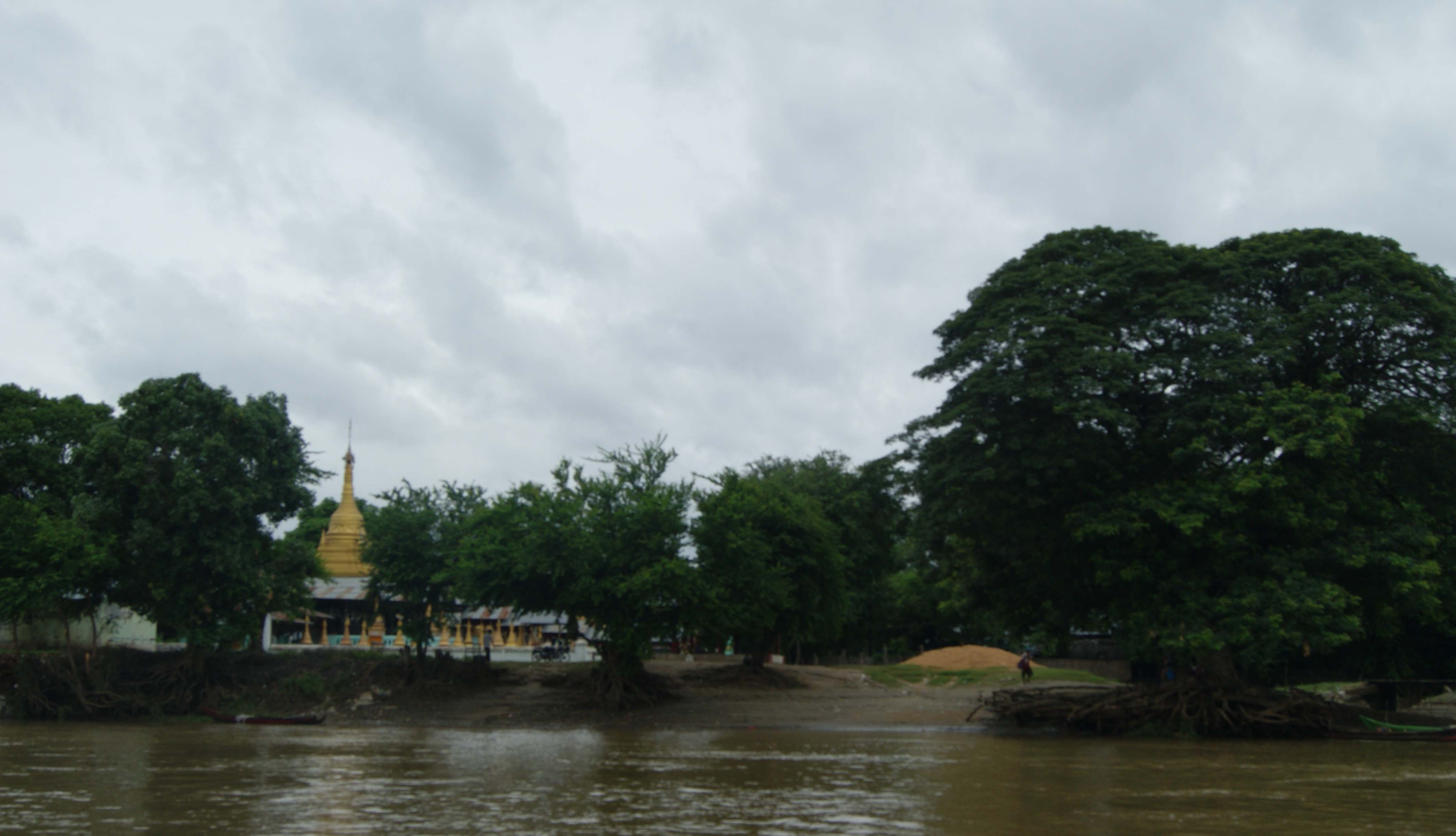
- Ngazun Port

- Location in Myanmar
- Coordinates: 21°53′45″N 95°41′20″E
- Country: Myanmar
- Region: Mandalay Region
- District: Tada-U District
- Township: Nganzun Township

Population (2005)
  - Religions: Buddhism
- Time zone: UTC+6:30 (MST)

Nganzun is a town in the Mandalay Region of central Myanmar. It is the seat of Nganzun Township.
