= Tada-U District =

Tada-U District တံတားဦးခရိုင်
- District
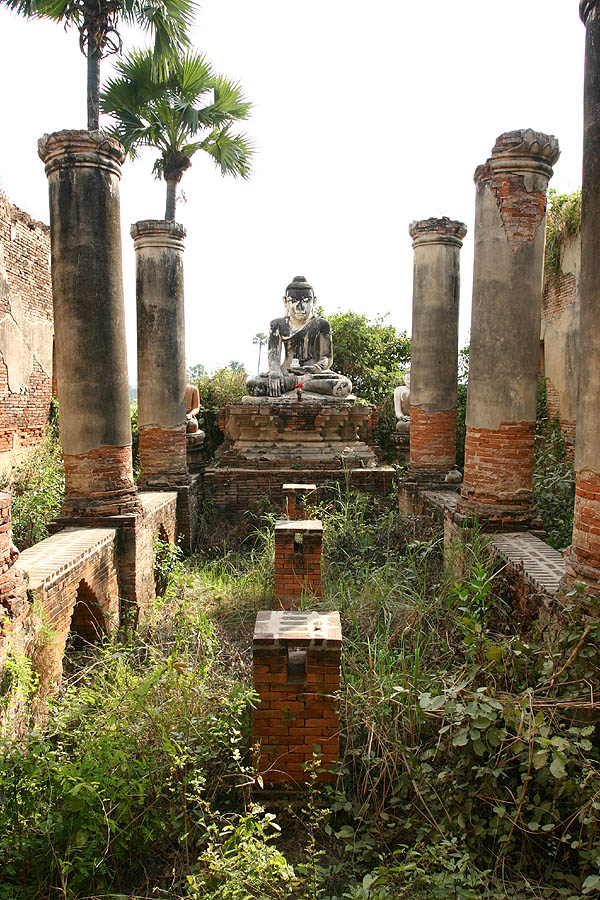
- Innwa Ancient Culture Area

- location in Mandalay region

- Location in Burma
- Coordinates: 21°48′0″N 95°58′0″E
- Country: Myanmar
- Region: Mandalay
- Time zone: UTC6:30 (MST)

Tada-U (Burmese: တံတားဦး ခရိုင်) is the district of Mandalay Region, Myanmar. Its principal town is Tada-U.

== Townships ==
Townships of Tada-U District Tada-U Township Ngazun Township

The townships, cities, towns that are included in Tada-U District are as follows:

- Tada-U Township
  - Tada-U
  - Inwa
- Ngazun Township
  - Ngazun

== History ==
On April 30, 2022, new districts were expanded and organized. Tada-U Township from Kyaukse District and Ngazun Township from Myingyan District were formed as Tada-U District.
