= Tada-U Township =

Tada-U Township တံတားဦးမြို့နယ်
- Township
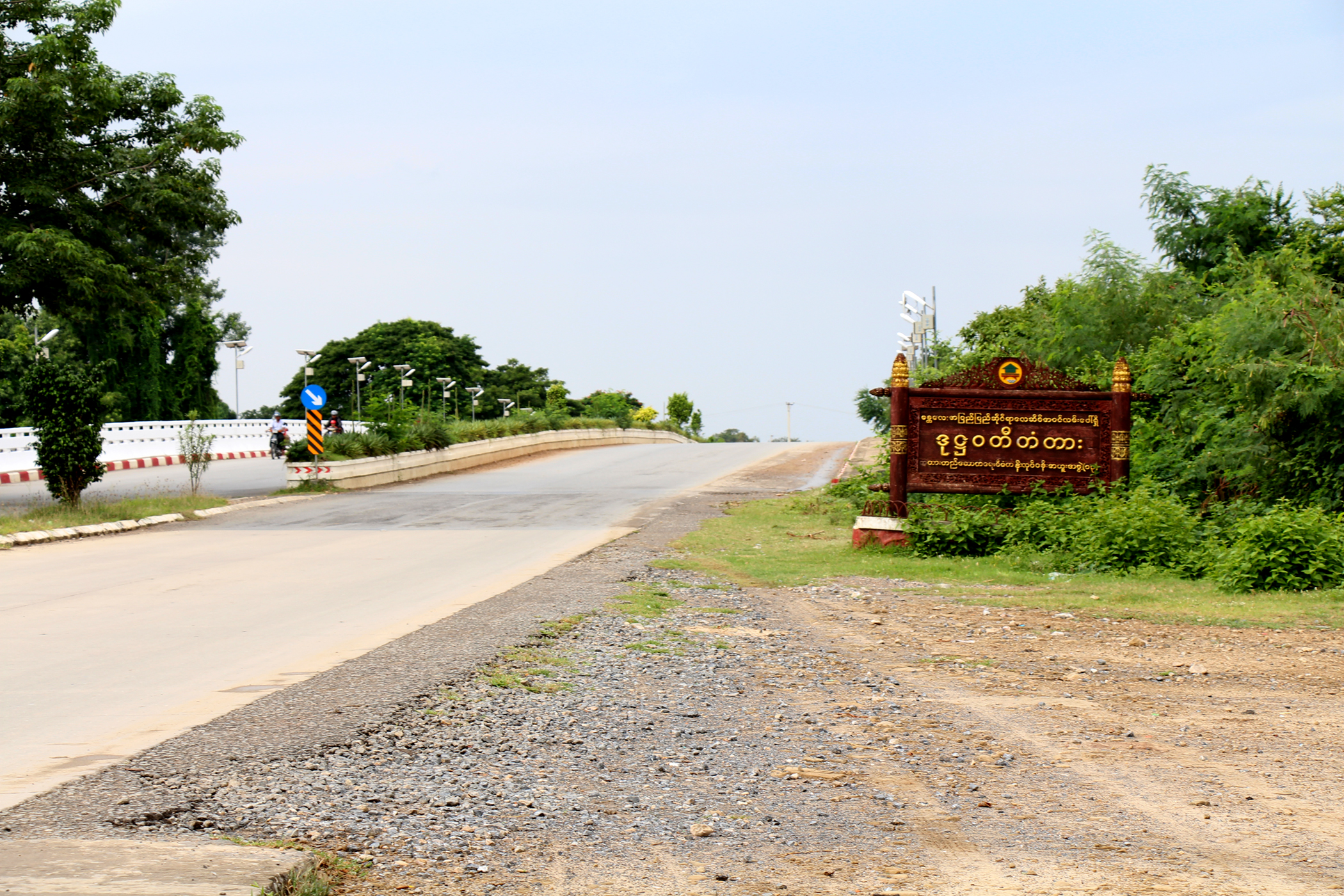

- Location (red) in Tada-U District
- Coordinates: 21°49′08″N 95°58′25″E
- Country: Myanmar
- Region: Mandalay Region
- District: Tada-U District
- Capital: Tada-U

Government
  - Type: Township Municipal
  - MP: Thiha Aung

Area
  - Total: 363.99 sq mi (942.7 km^{2})
- Elevation: 200 ft (61 m)

Population (2023)
  - Total: 152,077
  - Density: 417.81/sq mi (161.32/km^{2})
- Time zone: UTC+6:30 (MMT)
- Postal code: 05131

Tada-U Township (Burmese: တံတားဦးမြို့နယ်) is a township of Tada-U District in central Mandalay Region of Myanmar. The ruins of the ancient city of Inwa is located in the townships' northeastern corner.

Tada-U Township has one town, the principal town of Tada-U, which is sub-divided into 3 wards; while Tada-U Township's rural area is sub-divided into 61 village-tracts, which are further sub-divided into 165 villages.

== Village tracts ==
1. Gwaykone
2. Hta Naung Kaing
3. Zee Kang
4. Thabyegan
5. Taungbyone
6. Kangyi
7. Thaman
8. Thedaw
9. Gaungkwe
10. Myaengu
11. Chaungkwa
12. Myinthe
13. Pyukan
14. Hantharwaddy
15. Zaygyo
16. Zaga-in
17. Zaga-te
18. Zaba twin
19. Aung Thar
20. Myinsaing
