= Mandalay Chanmyathazi Airport =

Mandalay ChanMyatharzi Airport မန္တလေး ချမ်းမြသာစည်လေဆိပ်
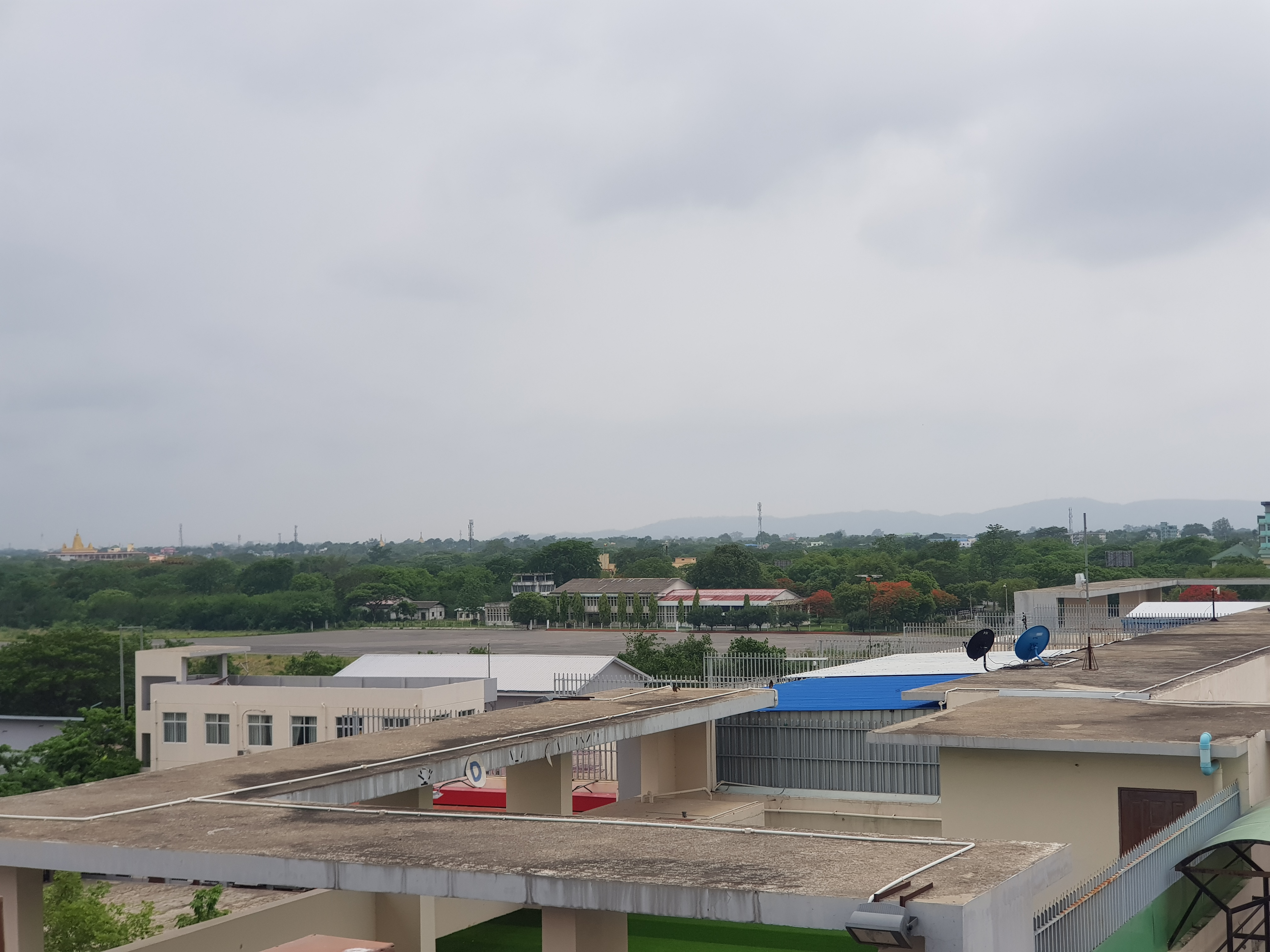
- IATA: VBC; ICAO: VYCZ

Summary
- Airport type: Defunct
- Operator: Civil Government
- Location: Chanmyathazi, Mandalay
- Elevation AMSL: 252 ft (77 m)
- Coordinates: 21°56′25.94″N 96°5′22.51″E
- Interactive map of Mandalay ChanMyatharzi Airport

Runways
Direction	Length		Surface
Direction	ft	m	Surface
01/19	6,549	1,996	Paved

Mandalay Chanmyathazi Airport (IATA: VBC, ICAO: VYCZ) is a domestic airport in Myanmar that served Mandalay and surrounding areas. It was the main airport serving Mandalay until 2000 when it was replaced by Mandalay International Airport. During May 1942, the airport was under control of the Imperial Japanese Army. It was attacked by Allied bombers starting in late 1942, and on March 21, 1945, the British Army 14th Army captured the city and the airport after Japanese resistance ceased.

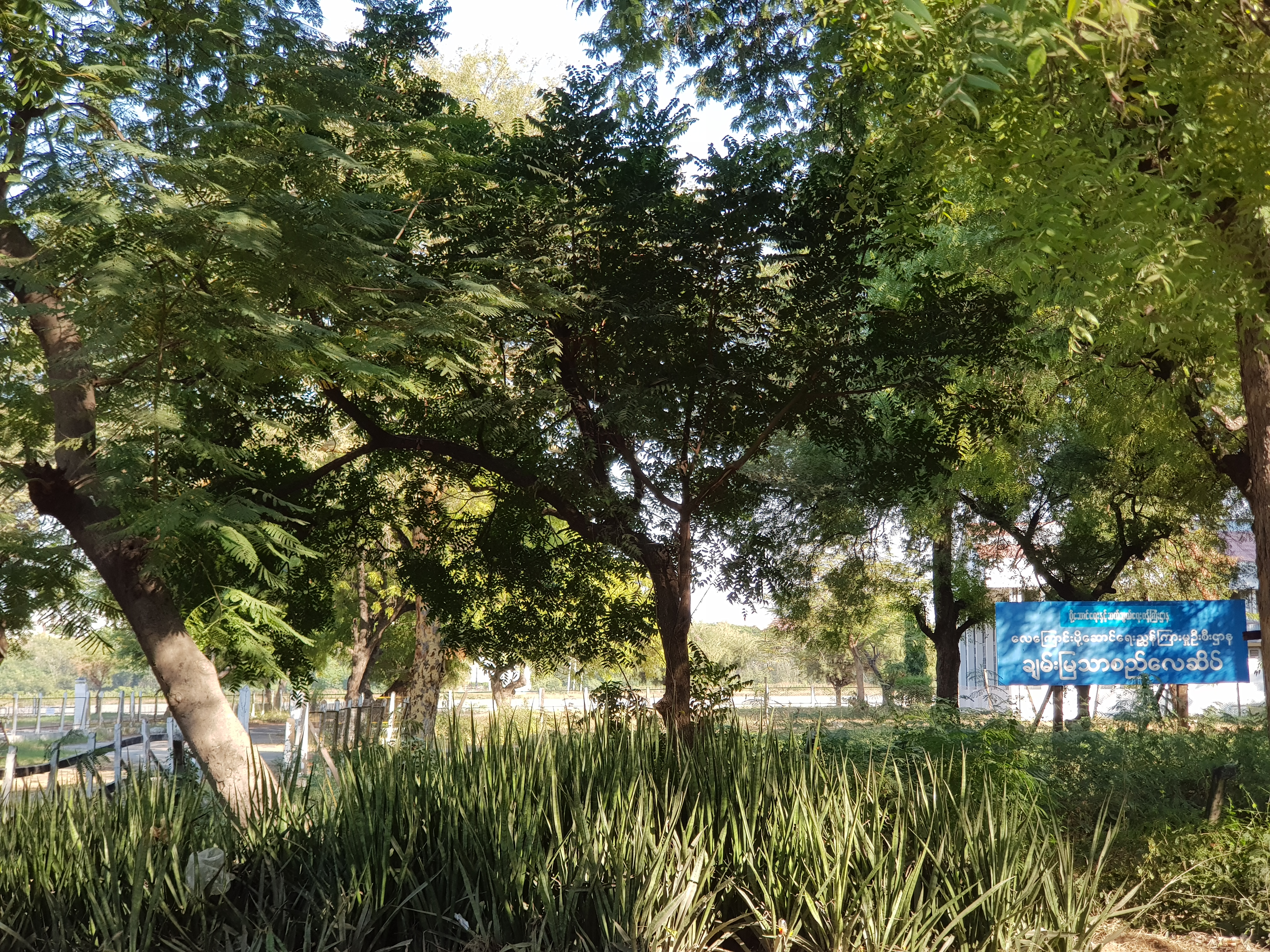
Main Entrance
