= Ngazun Township =

Ngazun Township ငါန်းဇွန်မြို့နယ်
- Township
- Location in Tada-U District
- Coordinates: 21°53′N 95°41′E
- Country: Myanmar
- Region: Mandalay Region
- District: Tada-U District
- Seat: Ngazun
- Time zone: UTC+6.30 (MMT)

Ngazun Township is a township of Tada-U District in central Mandalay Division of Myanmar. Its capital is Ngazun. As of 2014, the total population of Ngazun Township is 124,233.
