= Sado, Benin =

Coordinates: 6.5542°N 2.6616°E

Sado
- Arrondissement
- Interactive map of Sado
- Country: Benin
- Department: Ouémé Department
- Commune: Avrankou

Population (2002)
  - Total: 5,338
- Time zone: UTC+1 (WAT)

Sado is an arrondissement in the Ouémé department of Benin. It is an administrative division under the jurisdiction of the commune of Avrankou. According to the population census conducted by the Institut National de la Statistique Benin on February 15, 2002, the arrondissement had a total population of 5338.
