= Palaung traditional costume =

Traditional Clothing in Myanmar

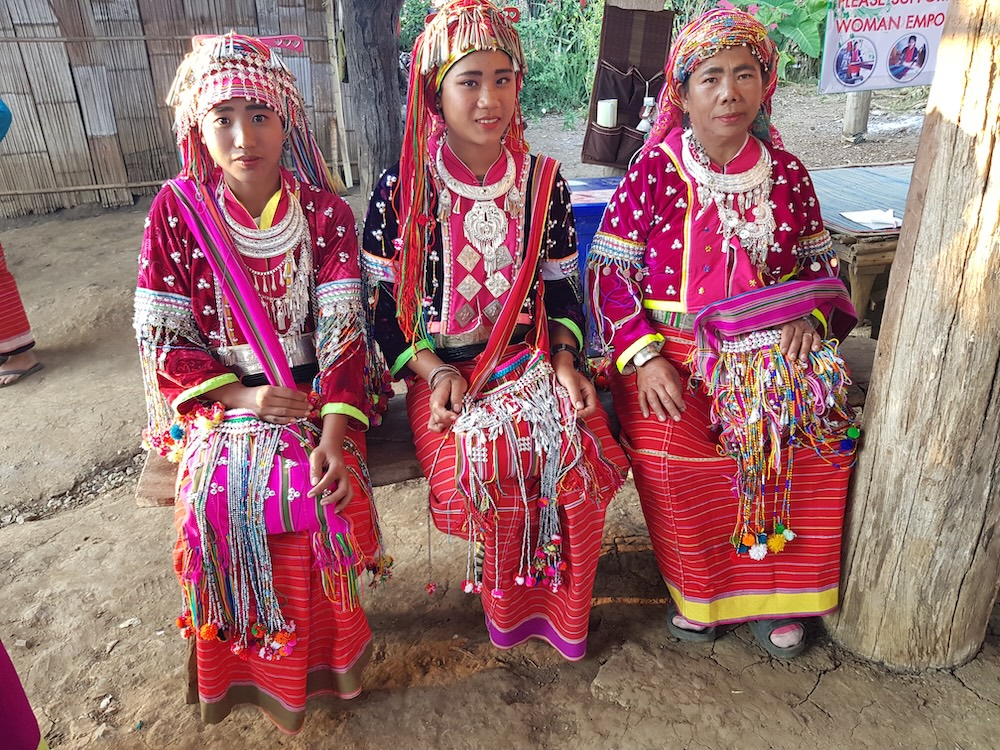
Palaung women dressed in traditional attire (Picture by Frans Betgem)

The Palaung traditional costume refers to the traditional clothing worn by the Palaung people (also known as the Ta'ang), an ethnic group primarily residing in Myanmar with smaller communities in northern Thailand and southern China. The Palaung traditional attire features vibrant colors, intricate embroidery, and silver ornaments reflecting the cultural identity and heritage of the Palaung people.

A traditional Palaung woman's outfit consists of a long-sleeved blouse and a wrap-around skirt known as a longyi, worn with a distinctive belt adorned with silver discs. In contrast, men's clothing is simpler, typically consisting of plain shirts and trousers. The patterns, colors, and accessories often indicate marital status, social standing, or regional identity. Traditional attire is primarily worn during religious ceremonies, festivals and other significant cultural events.

== Women's traditional costume ==
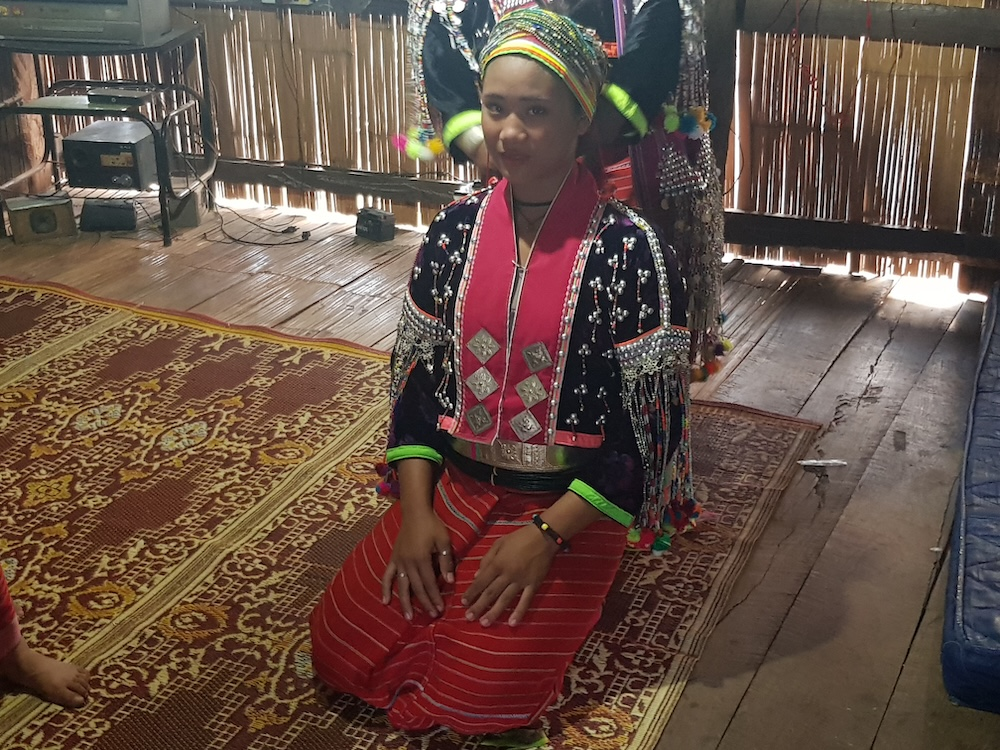
A Palaung girl dressed in traditional women's costume (Picture by Frans Betgem).

Palaung women wear a vibrant colored short blouse known as a salow, paired with a glahng, a long tubular skirt, and a multi-layered belt. Women's traditional blouses are made from shiny commercial fabrics and fastened with a safety pin. It is decorated with sequins, embroidery and brocade, especially along the sleeves and lower back. The glahng is handwoven using a backstrap loom, featuring horizontal multicolored stripes. In Shan State, Myanmar, women's traditional dress tends to reflect individual taste rather than strict age or social classifications. However, among Palaung communities in northern Thailand, age-related distinctions in attire are more common.

A significant feature of the women's traditional attire is the three-part belt system. This includes a plain cotton sash (called nong roh), bamboo hoops (nong von or nong rein), and a silver belt (nong rurh). This three-layered belt system is rooted in the legend of the Keinnari, a celestial being said to have been bound to earth by magical belts in Palaung folklore. Women's headwear ranges from simple turbans to velvet caps. Both Palaung men and women carry handwoven shoulder bags that are decorated with traditional patterns.

== Men's traditional costume ==
Compared to women's attire, Palaung men's clothing is simpler. It typically includes a plain shirt and trousers or a longyi. In some regions, older men wear Chinese-style trousers and head wraps. Handwoven shoulder bags with striped patterns are commonly accessorized by both Palaung men and women, commonly seen in markets such as those in Kalaw.

== Materials and weaving techniques ==
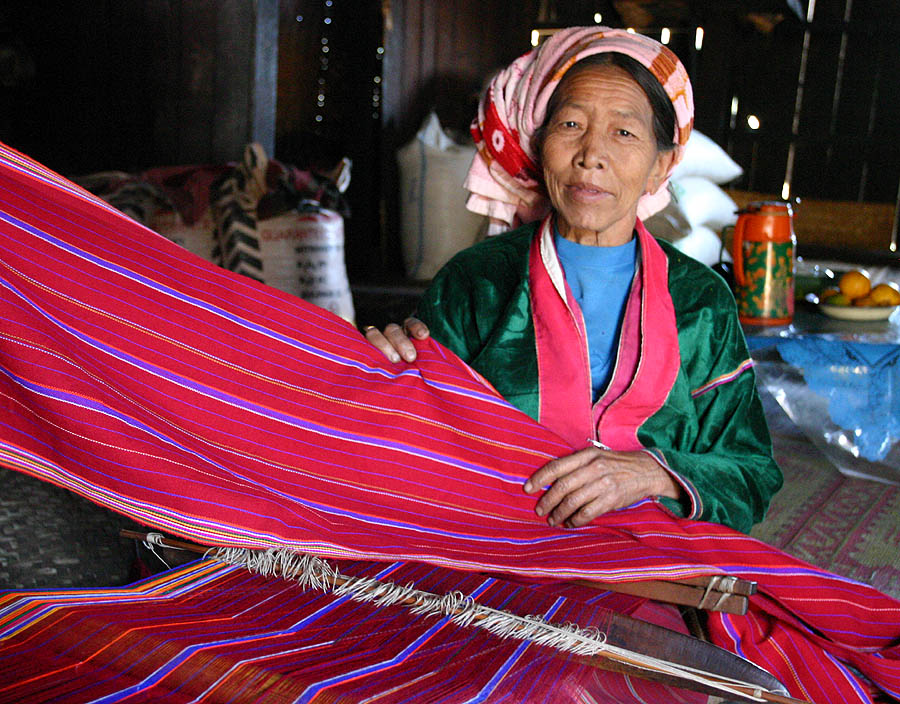
A Palaung woman weaving at the Kalaw market.

The Palaung traditionally cultivated their own cotton and hemp, using cotton for garments and hemp for making bags. Weaving is a seasonal, domestic activity primarily undertaken by women. Traditional weaving uses a backstrap loom with leather or plastic back supports, depending on availability. Leather is more commonly used in Myanmar, while plastic is more often used in Thailand.

== Symbolism and cultural beliefs ==
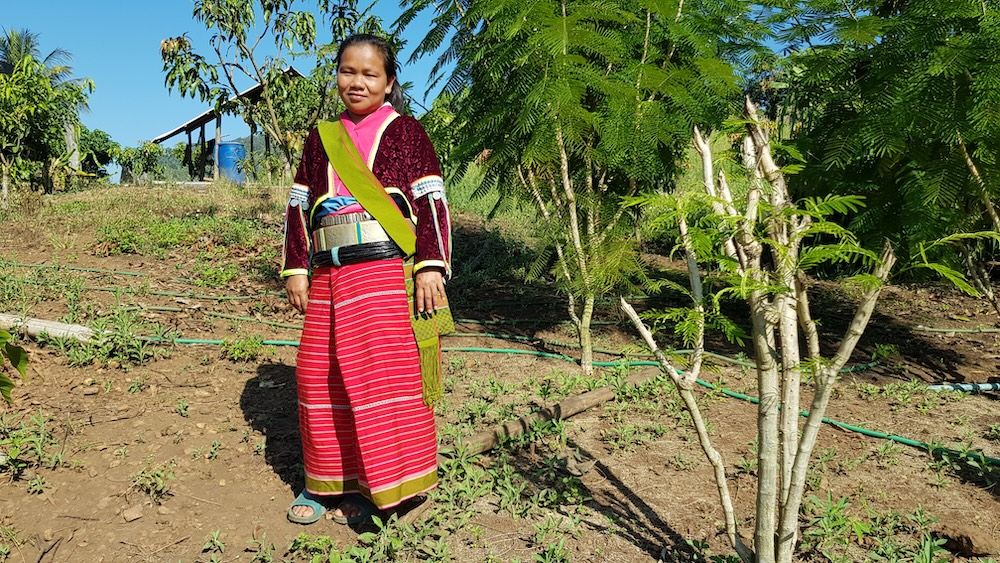
A Palaung woman wearing the three-layered belt inspired by the Keinnari legend, symbolizing the magical belts that bound the celestial being to earth in folklore. (Picture by Frans Betgem)

The Palaung traditional costume is deeply symbolic and tied to cultural beliefs. The three-layered belt system worn by women is associated with the Keinnari legend, a celestial being, known as Keinnari, a half-human and half-bird who was bound to earth by magical belts. Other symbolic elements include the use of safety pins (originally replacing traditional jungle thorns as fasteners) and the high positioning of the sarong, referencing the unique dressing of mythical creatures. The bamboo hoops are worn around the waist as a spiritual protection and to bring good fortune.
