= Kandawgyi Gardens, Mandalay =

Park in Mandalay, Myanmar

Kandawgyi Gardens
- ကန်တော်ကြီး ဥယျာဉ်
- Type: Urban park
- Location: Chanmyathazi, Mandalay
- Area: 800 acres (320 ha)
- Status: Open all year

The Kandawgyi Gardens (Burmese: ကန်တော်ကြီး ဥယျာဉ်, pronounced [kàɰ̃dɔ̀dʑí ʔṵjɪ̀ɰ̃]; also known as Mandalay Kandawgyi Gardens) is a major park in Mandalay, Myanmar. The park consists of over 700 acres (283 hectares) of Kandawgyi Lake and 96 acres (39 hectares) of land area.
