= Maha Aungmye Township =

Maha Aungmye Township မဟာအောင်မြေ မြို့နယ်
- Township of Mandalay
- Maha Aungmye Township
- Mahaaungmye township in Mandalay district

- Location within Myanmar
- Coordinates: 21°57′0″N 96°5′0″E
- Country: Burma
- Division: Mandalay
- City: Mandalay
- Township: Mahaaungmye
- Time zone: UTC6:30 (MST)
- Area codes: 2 (mobile: 69, 90)

Maha Aungmye Township (Burmese: မဟာအောင်မြေ မြို့နယ် [məhà àʊɰ̃ mjè mjo̰nɛ̀], also known as Mahaaungmye Township) is located immediately south of downtown Mandalay, Myanmar. It is the major residential area of Mandalay. The township is bounded by the Ayeyarwady river in the west, Chanayethazan Township in the north, Chanmyathazi Township in the south. The city's main university, Mandalay University is located here.

== Notable places ==
- Mandalay University
