= Pyigyidagun Township =

Pyigyidagun Township ပြည်ကြီးတံခွန်မြို့နယ်
- Township of Mandalay
- Pyigyidagun Township
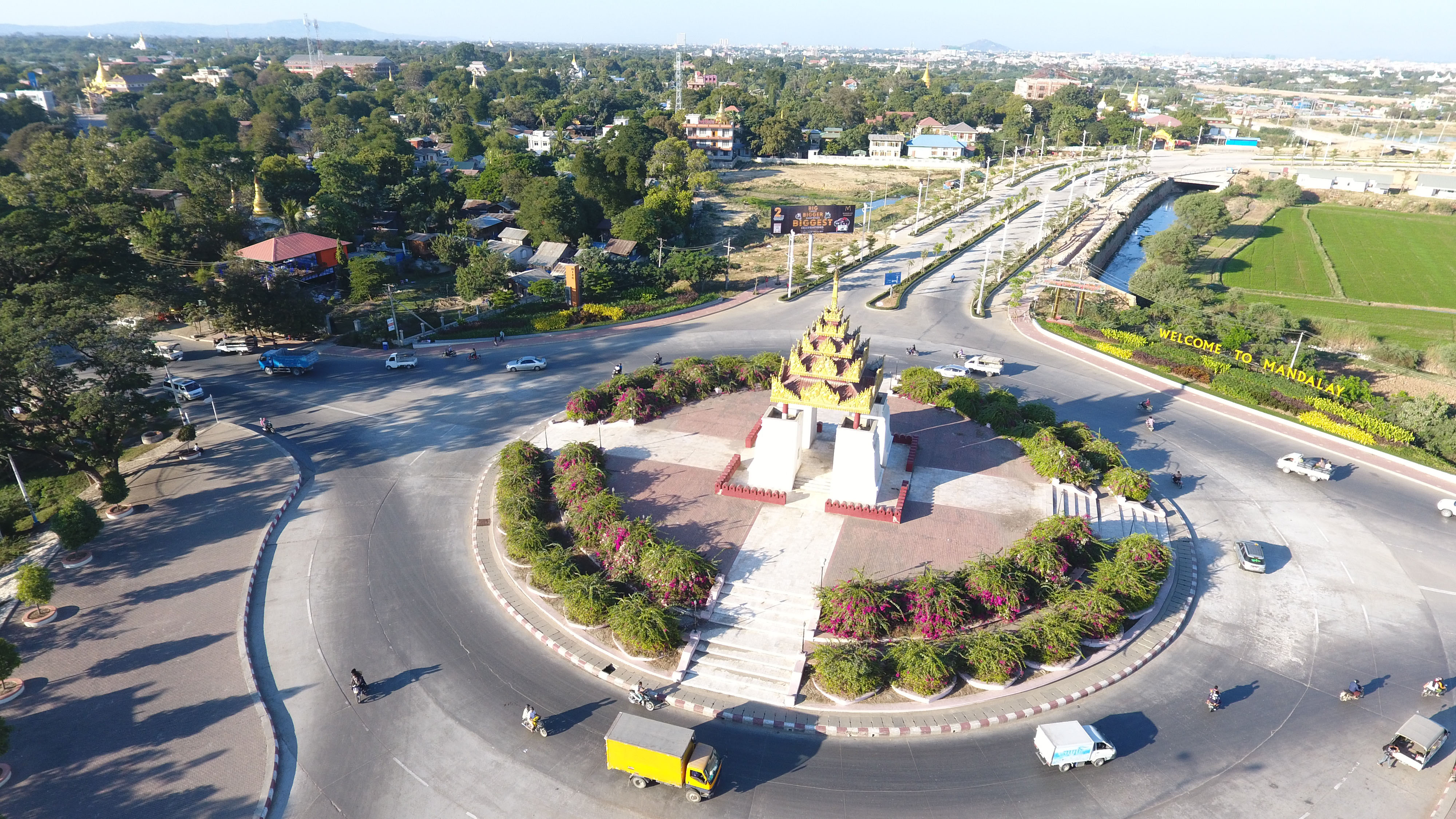

- Pyigyidagun township in Mandalay district

- Location within Myanmar
- Coordinates: 21°55′0″N 96°5′0″E
- Country: Burma
- Division: Mandalay
- City: Mandalay
- Township: Pyigyidagun
- Time zone: UTC6:30 (MST)
- Area codes: 2 (mobile: 69, 90)

Pyigyidagun Township (also spelled Pyigyitagun Township; pronounced [pjìdʑí dəɡʊ̀ɰ̃ mjo̰nɛ̀]) is located in the southern part of Mandalay, Myanmar. The township is bounded by Chanmyathazi Township to the north and the west, and Amarapura to the south.
