= Chanmyathazi Township =

Chanmyathazi Township ချမ်းမြသာစည် မြို့နယ်
- Township of Mandalay
- Chanmyathazi Township
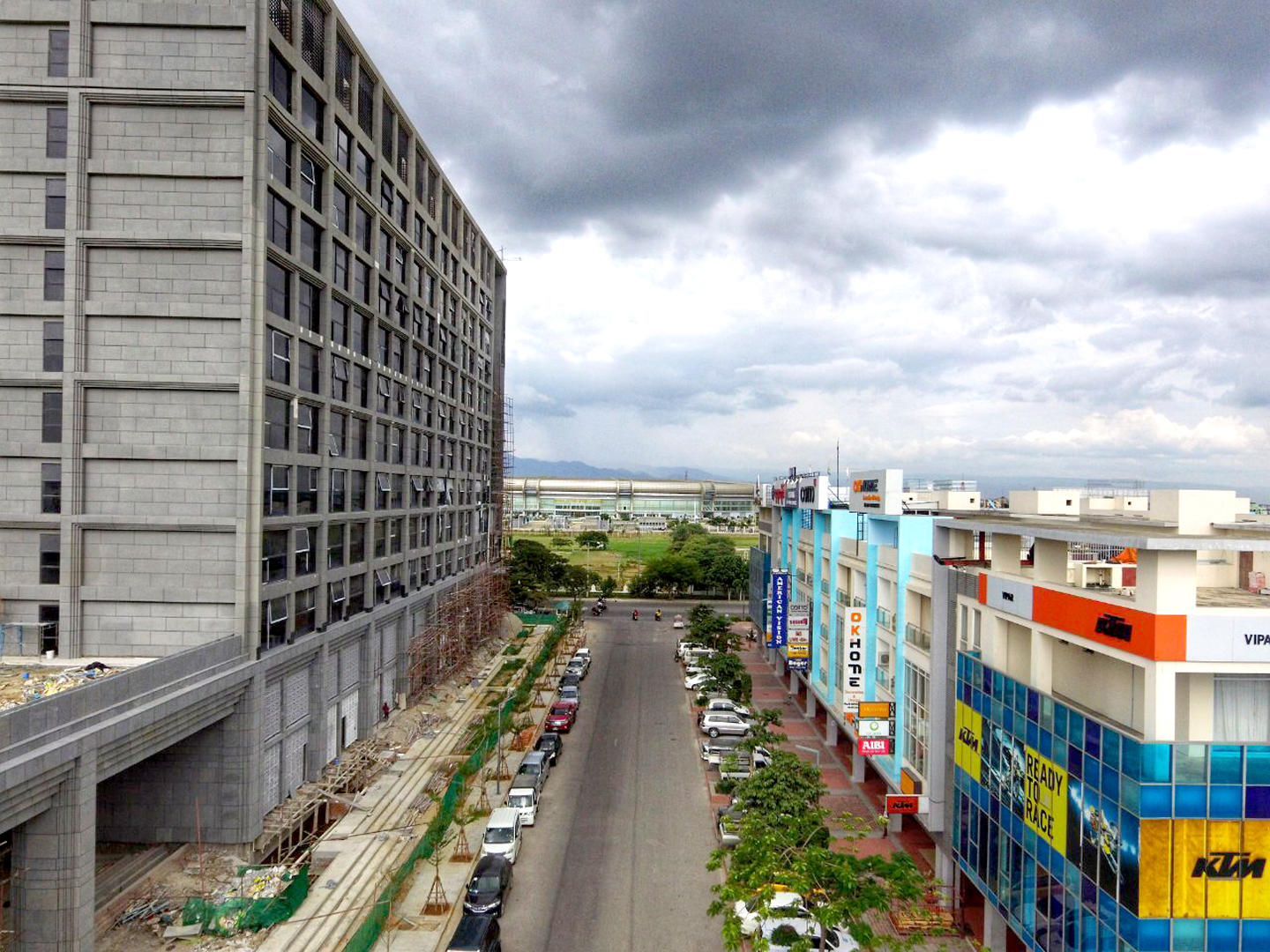

- Chanmyathazi township in Mandalay

- Location within Myanmar
- Coordinates: 21°56′0″N 96°5′0″E
- Country: Burma
- Division: Mandalay
- City: Mandalay
- Township: Chanmyathazi
- Time zone: UTC6:30 (MST)
- Area codes: 2 (mobile: 69, 90)

Chanmyathazi Township (also spelled Chanmyathasi Township; Burmese: ချမ်းမြသာစည် မြို့နယ်, pronounced [tɕʰáɰ̃ mja̰ θà zì mjo̰nɛ̀]) is located in south-central area of Mandalay, Myanmar. Chanmyathazi is bounded by the Ayeyarwady river in the west, Maha Aungmye Township in the north, Pyigyidagun Township in the south. The Mahamuni Buddha, one of the city's main tourist attractions, is located in the township. It is home to University of Dental Medicine, Mandalay.

== Notable places ==
- Chanmyathazi Airport
- Jivitadana Sangha Hospital
- Kandawgyi Gardens (Tatthay Lake)
- Mahamuni Buddha
- Mandalay Institute of Nursing
