= Myitnge =

Myitnge မြစ်ငယ်မြို့
- Town
- Location in Burma
- Coordinates: 21°51′26″N 96°04′12″E
- Country: Myanmar
- Region: Mandalay
- District: Amarapura
- Township: Amarapura
- Time zone: UTC+6.30 (MST)

Myitnge (Burmese: မြစ်ငယ်မြို့) is a town in Amarapura Township in the Mandalay Region of central Burma. It is situated between Amarapura and the Myitnge River and lies along National Highway 1 which connects it to the city of Mandalay in the north.

It has one of Burma's main railway workshops for passenger coaches and freight wagons. The General Strike of 1974 started at the Myitnge railway yard at the end of May spreading to the rest of the country including the capital Rangoon where it ended in bloodshed when the army opened fire on workers at Thamaing textile mill and Simmalaik dockyard.
