= Amarapura District =

Amarapura District အမရပူရခရိုင်
- District
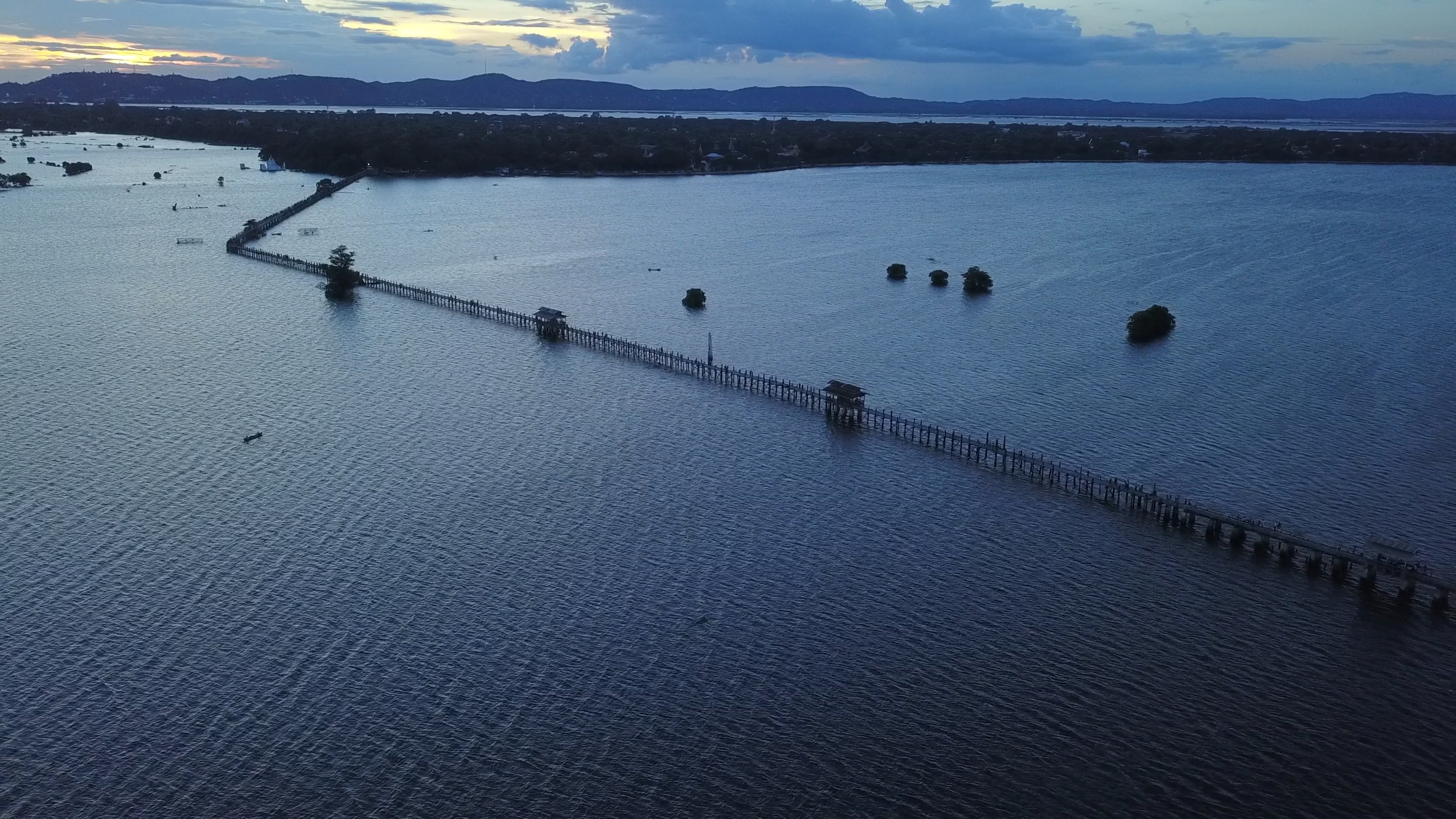
- U Bein Bridge

- Location in Mandalay region

- Location in Burma
- Coordinates: 21°58′0″N 96°06′0″E
- Country: Myanmar
- Region: Mandalay
- Time zone: UTC+6:30 (MST)

Amarapura District (Burmese: အမရပူရ ခရိုင်) is the district of Mandalay Region, Myanmar. Partly included under Mandalay City Development Committee and Mandalay. Its principal town is Amarapura. Amarapura District has only one township.

== Townships ==
Townships of Amarapura District Amarapura Township

The townships, cities, towns that are included in Amarapura District are as follows:

- Amarapura Township
  - Amarapura (part of Mandalay)
  - Myitnge

== History ==
On 30 April 2022, new districts were expanded and organized. Amarapura Township from Mandalay District was promoted as a district.
