= Mandalay Region =

Region of Myanmar

Mandalay Region မန္တလေးတိုင်းဒေသကြီး
- Region

Myanma transcription(s)
  - Burmese: manta.le: tuing: desa. kri:
- Flag Seal

- Location of Mandalay Region in Myanmar
- Coordinates: 21°0′N 95°45′E
- Country: Myanmar
- Region: Upper
- Capital: Mandalay

Government
  - Chief Minister: Myo Aung
  - Cabinet: Mandalay Region Government
  - Legislature: Mandalay Region Hluttaw
  - Judiciary: Mandalay Region High Court

Area
  - Total: 37,945.6 km^{2} (14,650.9 sq mi)
  - Rank: 7th
- Highest elevation (Taungme): 2,302 m (7,552 ft)

Population (2014)
  - Total: 6,165,723
  - Rank: 3rd
  - Density: 162.488/km^{2} (420.843/sq mi)
- Demonym: Mandalayan

Demographics
  - Ethnicities: Bamar, Chinese, Shan, Chin, Kayin, South Asians
  - Religions: Buddhism 95.70%, Islam 3.00%, Christianity 1.10%, and Hinduism 0.2%
- Time zone: UTC+06:30 (MST)
- HDI (2017): 0.570 medium · 5th
- Website: www.mandalayregion.gov.mm

Mandalay Region (Burmese: မန္တလေးတိုင်းဒေသကြီး, pronounced [máɰ̃dəlé táiɰ̃ dèθa̰ dʑí]; formerly Mandalay Division) is a first-level administrative division of Myanmar. It is located in the center of the country, bordering Sagaing Region and Magway Region to the west, Shan State to the east, and Bago Region and Kayin State to the south. The regional capital city is Mandalay. To the south of the region lies the national capital city of Naypyidaw. The region consists of eleven districts, which are subdivided into 28 townships and 2,320 wards and village-tracts.

Mandalay Region is important in Myanmar's economy, accounting for 15% of the national economy. It is under the administration of the Mandalay Region Government.

== History ==
The history of Mandalay Region is the same as that of much of Upper Myanmar except that for much of Burmese history, the political power emanated out of royal capitals located in Mandalay Region. The country's present capital, Naypyidaw, and most former royal capitals of the Burmese nation—Bagan, Ava, Amarapura, Mandalay—are all located here.

Mandalay Region and Naypyidaw Union Territory

The Tibeto-Burman speaking Pyu were the first historical people to dominate the Dry Zone in central Myanmar that includes Mandalay Region as early as the 1st century AD. By the early 9th century, the Pyu were decimated in a series of wars with the Nanzhao kingdom from Yunnan. The Burmans, who had been migrating into the region from Yunnan in the 9th century, founded a city of their own, Pagan, in 849. The Pagan dynasty gradually came to dominate the central zone over the next two centuries, and by the late 11th century, all of present-day Myanmar. The Burmese language and script came to prominence with royal patronage of Pagan kings.

After the fall of Pagan to the Mongols in 1287, parts of central Myanmar came to be controlled by a series of rulers: the Mongols (1287-c.1303), Myinsaing (1298–1313), Pinya (1313–1364), and Sagaing (1315–1364). In 1364, Ava kingdom led by Burmanized Shan kings reunified all of central Myanmar. Central Myanmar was under Ava's control until 1527, and under the Shans of Monhyin (1527–1555). Burmese literature and culture came into its own during this era. Central Myanmar was part of the Taungoo kingdom from 1555 to 1752. Parts of the region fell briefly to the Mons of Pegu (Bago) (1752–1753). Konbaung dynasty ruled the region until December 1885 when it lost all of Upper Myanmar in the Third Anglo-Burmese War.

The British administration organized seven divisions in Upper Myanmar: Mandalay, Meiktila, Minbu, Sagaing, and the Federated Shan States (North and South). Mandalay Division included what is now Kachin State. Circa 1940, Meiktila Division was merged with Mandalay Division. Much of Upper Myanmar, including Mandalay Division, was under Japanese rule during World War II between May 1942 and March 1945. When the country gained independence from the United Kingdom in January 1948, the Myikyina and Bhamo districts were carved out to form Kachin State.

== Administrative divisions ==
Before 2010, Mandalay Region consisted of 8 districts. Later Pyinmana district was formed as Union Territory under the direct administration of president. So Mandalay Region remains 28 townships organized into eleven districts.

=== Districts ===
Aungmyethazan District Maha Aungmye District Amarapura District Pyinoolwin District Thabeikkyin District Kyaukse District Tada-U District Myingyan District Nyaung-U District Meiktila District Yamethin District

=== Townships ===
Maha Aungmye District (မဟာအောင်မြေခရိုင်)	Maha Aungmye Township (မဟာအောင်မြေမြို့နယ်) • Chanayethazan Township (ချမ်းအေးသာစံမြို့နယ်) • Chanmyathazi Township (ချမ်းမြသာစည်မြို့နယ်) • Pyigyidagun Township (ပြည်ကြီးတံခွန်မြို့နယ်)
Aungmyethazan District (အောင်မြေသာဇံခရိုင်)	Aungmyethazan Township (အောင်မြေသာဇံမြို့နယ်) • Patheingyi Township (ပုသိမ်ကြီးမြို့နယ်) • Madaya Township (မတ္တရာမြို့နယ်)
Amarapura District (အမရပူရခရိုင်)	Amarapura Township (အမရပူရမြို့နယ်)
Pyinoolwin District (ပြင်ဦးလွင်ခရိုင်)	Pyinoolwin Township (ပြင်ဦးလွင်မြို့နယ်)
Thabeikkyin District (သပိတ်ကျင်းခရိုင်)	Thabeikkyin Township (သပိတ်ကျင်းမြို့နယ်) • Singu Township (စဉ့်ကူးမြို့နယ်) • Mogok Township (မိုးကုတ်မြို့နယ်)
Kyaukse District (ကျောက်ဆည်ခရိုင်)	Kyaukse Township (ကျောက်ဆည်) • Myittha Township (မြစ်သားမြို့နယ်) • Sintgaing Township (စဥ့်ကိုင်မြို့နယ်)
Tada-U District (တံတားဦးခရိုင်)၊	Tada-U Township (တံတားဦးမြို့နယ်) • Ngazun Township (ငါန်းဇွန်မြို့နယ်)
Meiktila District (မိတ္ထီလာခရိုင်)	Mahlaing Township (မလှိုင်မြို့နယ်) • Meiktila Township (မိတ္ထီလာမြို့နယ်) • Thazi Township(သာစည်မြို့နယ်) • Wundwin Township (ဝမ်းတွင်းမြို့နယ်)
Myingyan District (မြင်းခြံခရိုင်)	Myingyan Township (မြင်းခြံမြို့နယ်) • Natogyi Township (နွားထိုးကြီးမြို့နယ်) • Taungtha Township (တောင်သာမြို့နယ်)
Nyaung-U District (ညောင်ဦးခရိုင်)	Nyaung-U Township (ညောင်ဦးမြို့နယ်) • Kyaukpadaung Township (ကျောက်ပန်းတောင်းမြို့နယ်)
Yamethin District (ရမည်းသင်းခရိုင်)	Pyawbwe Township (ပျော်ဘွယ်မြို့နယ်) • Yamethin Township (ရမည်းသင်းမြို့နယ်)

=== Towns ===
(30) cities and towns of Mandalay Region Region Capital District and Township Capital Township Capital Town

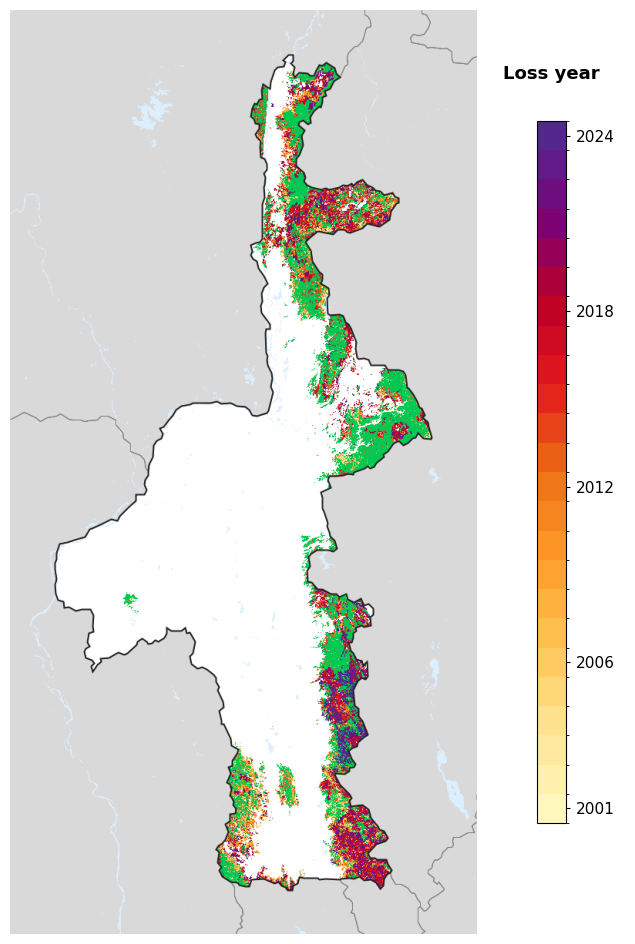
Tree-cover loss year in Mandalay Region, 2001-2024, from the Global Forest Change dataset.

- Mandalay
- Amarapura
- Pyinoolwin
- Thabeikkyin
- Tada-U
- Kyaukse
- Myingyan
- Meiktila
- Nyaung-U
- Yamethin
- Patheingyi
- Madaya
- Mogok
- Singu
- Ngazun
- Myittha
- Sintgaing
- Natogyi
- Taungtha
- Thazi
- Wundwin
- Mahlaing
- Kyaukpadaung
- Pyawbwe
- Myitnge
- Tagaung
- Kume
- Bagan
- Semekon
- Ngathayout

== Government ==
=== Executive ===
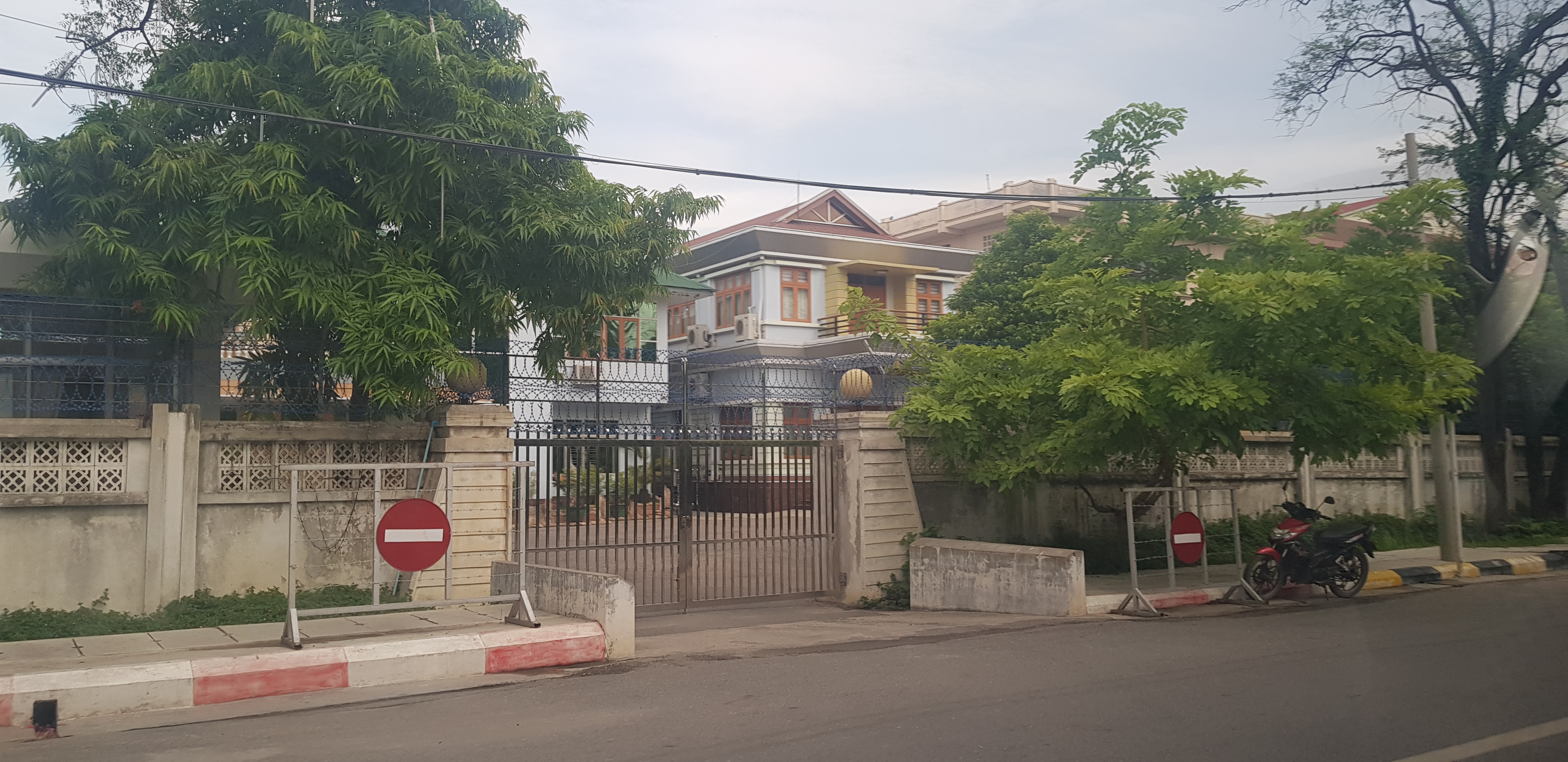
Regional Government Office

During the rule of the State Peace and Development Council, the divisional peace and development committee was the administrative body of Mandalay Region. In 2011, a new government form was introduced, and the Mandalay Region Government became the main administrative body of the region. The government is led by Chief Minister. The Government Office is located in Aungmyaythazan Township.

=== Legislature ===
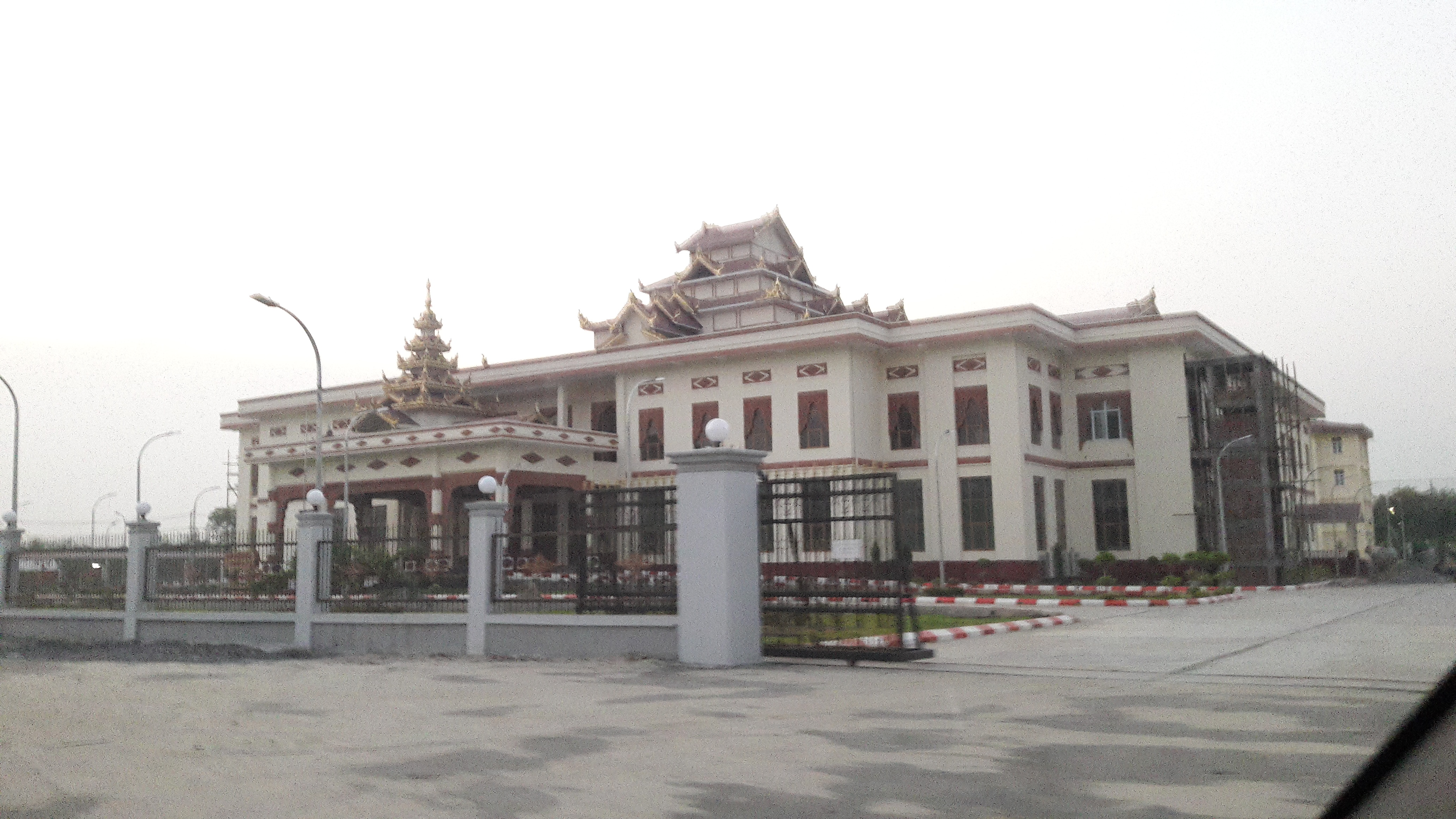
Regional Hluttaw

In 2011, the State and Region Hluttaws were introduced in the new system. Each State and Region has a State Hluttaw or Regional Hluttaw made up of elected civilian members and unelected representatives of the Armed Forces. The number of seats in each State or Region Hluttaw depends on the number of townships (each township constituency has two MPs), as well as ethnic representatives. The Mandalay Region Hluttaw have 57 elected members (include one ethnic affairs minister) and 19 military representatives.

=== Judiciary ===
Under the Mandalay Region High Court, there are eight district courts, Mandalay, Pyin Oo Lwin, Kyaukse, Meithtila, Myingyan, Nyaung Oo, Yamethin and Dakina (for Union Territory). There are 35 township courts including the townships of Union Territory and 5 special courts.

== Demographics ==
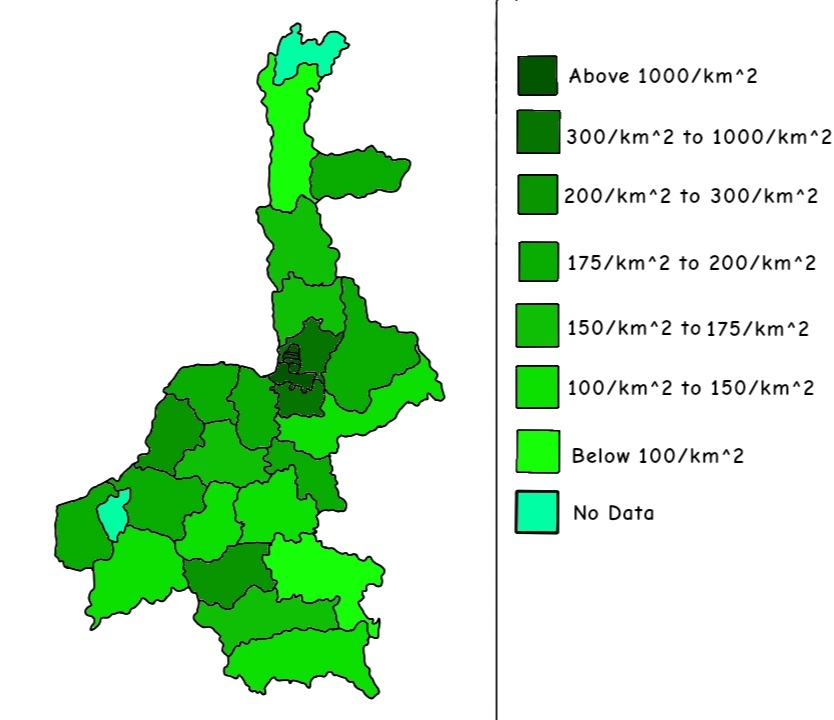
Population density of Mandalay Region as of 2024.

Historical population
Year	Pop.	±%
1973	3,668,493	—
1983	4,577,762	+24.8%
2014	6,165,723	+34.7%
Source: 2014 Myanmar census

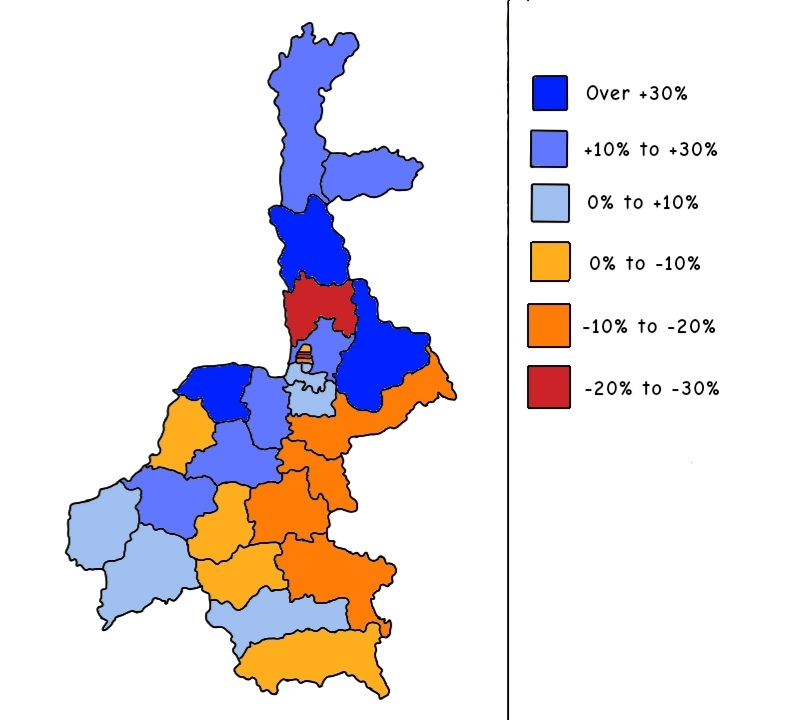
population change of Mandalay Region from 2014 to 2024

In 2014, the region had a population of 6.2 million people. Burmese is the primary language of the division. However, Mandarin Chinese is increasingly spoken in Mandalay and the northern gem mining town of Mogok.

=== Ethnic makeup ===
Ethnic composition of Mandalay Region
Ethnic group	Percentage
Bamar	95.8%
Other	2.3%
Shan	1.0%
Kachin	0.9%
Source: 2019 GAD township reports

The Bamar make up the majority of the region's population. Other groups, like the Shan and Kachin, form small minorities. In the Mandalay metropolitan area, however, a large community of Chinese, most of whom are recent immigrants from Yunnan, now nearly rival the Bamar population. A large community of Indians also reside in Mandalay. A dwindling community of Anglo-Burmese still exists in both Pyinoolwin and Mandalay. A number of Shan people live along the eastern border of the region.

After the 2014 Census in Myanmar, the Burmese government indefinitely withheld release of detailed ethnicity data, citing concerns around political and social concerns surrounding the issue of ethnicity in Myanmar. In 2022, researchers published an analysis of the General Administration Department's nationwide 2018-2019 township reports to tabulate the ethnic makeup of the region.

=== Religion ===
Religion in Mandalay (2015)
1. Buddhism (95.7%)
2. Islam (3.00%)
3. Christianity (1.10%)
4. Hinduism (0.20%)

According to the 2014 Myanmar census, Buddhists make up 95.7% of Mandalay Region's population, forming the largest religious community there. Minority religious communities include Christians (1.1%), Muslims (3%), and Hindus (0.2%) who collectively comprise the remainder of Mandalay Region's population.

According to the State Sangha Maha Nayaka Committee’s 2016 statistics, 99,964 Buddhist monks were registered in Mandalay Region, comprising 18.7% of Myanmar's total Sangha membership, which includes both novice samanera and fully ordained bhikkhu. Mandalay Region is home to Myanmar's largest bhikkhu community. The majority of monks belong to the Thudhamma Nikaya (92.3%), followed by Shwegyin Nikaya (7.1%), with the remainder of monks belonging to other small monastic orders. 8,174 thilashin were registered in Mandalay Region, comprising 13.5% of Myanmar’s total thilashin community.

== Economy ==
Agriculture is the primary economical source of livelihood. Primary crops grown within Mandalay Region are rice, wheat, maize, peanut, sesame, cotton, legumes, tobacco, chili, and vegetables. Industry, including alcoholic breweries, textile factories, sugar mills, and gem mines also exists. Tourism now forms a substantial part of Mandalay Region's economy, as it contains many historical sites including Mandalay, Amarapura, Bagan, Pyin U Lwin, Mount Popa, and Ava. Hardwoods such as teak and thanaka are also harvested.

== Education ==
Educational opportunities in Myanmar are extremely limited outside the main cities of Yangon and Mandalay. According to official statistics, over 1 million students were enrolled in the division's 4,467 primary and secondary schools in 2005. Of the total, the vast majority, about 4,000, were primary schools. Only about 13% of primary school students make it to high school.

AY 2002–2003	Primary	Middle	High
Schools	4,011	231	113
Teachers	19,000	7,200	2,500
Students	690,000	259,000	91,000

The region has some of the best institutions of higher education in Myanmar. As medical, engineering and computer studies are the most sought after in Myanmar, the University of Medicine, Mandalay, the University of Dental Medicine, Mandalay, Mandalay Technological University, and the University of Computer Studies, Mandalay are among the most selective universities in Myanmar. Other highly selective schools are Myanmar Aerospace Engineering University and military academies in Pyinoolwin: Defence Services Academy and Defence Services Technological Academy.

== Health care ==
The general state of health care in Myanmar is poor. The military government spends between 0.5% to 3% of the country's GDP on health care, consistently ranking among the lowest in the world. Although health care is nominally free, in reality patients have to pay for medicine and treatment even in public clinics and hospitals. Public hospitals lack many of the basic facilities and equipment. The following is a summary of the public health system in the division, in the fiscal year 2002–2003.

2002–2003	# Hospitals	# Beds
Specialist hospitals	7	1,725
General hospitals with specialist services	5	1,650
General hospitals	30	1,260
Health clinics	43	688
Total	85	5,323

In 2005, Mandalay Region's public health care system had slightly over 1,000 doctors and about 2,000 nurses working in 44 hospitals and 44 health clinics. Over 30 of the hospitals had less than 100 beds. Since almost all of large public hospitals and private hospitals, and doctors are located in Mandalay, these low numbers for a division with 7.7 million are actually even worse in the rest of the division, though these figures are believed to have improved by the advent of Naypyidaw as the nation's capital in 2006 although the level of improvement remains unreported. The well-to-do bypass the public health system and go to private clinics in Mandalay or Yangon in order to receive quicker medical attention and high-quality service. The wealthy routinely go abroad (usually Bangkok or Singapore) for treatment.

== Gallery ==
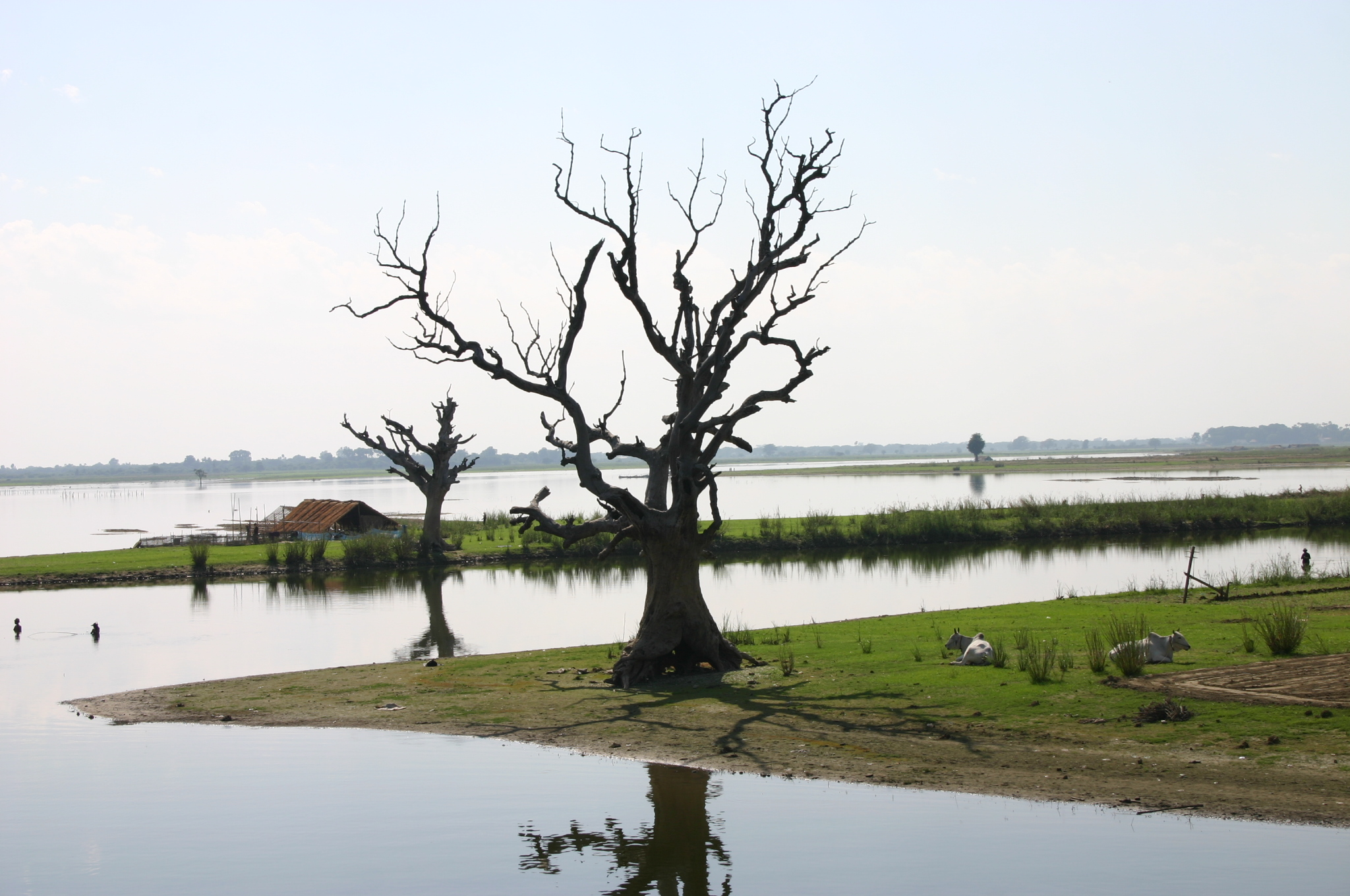
Thaungthaman Lake

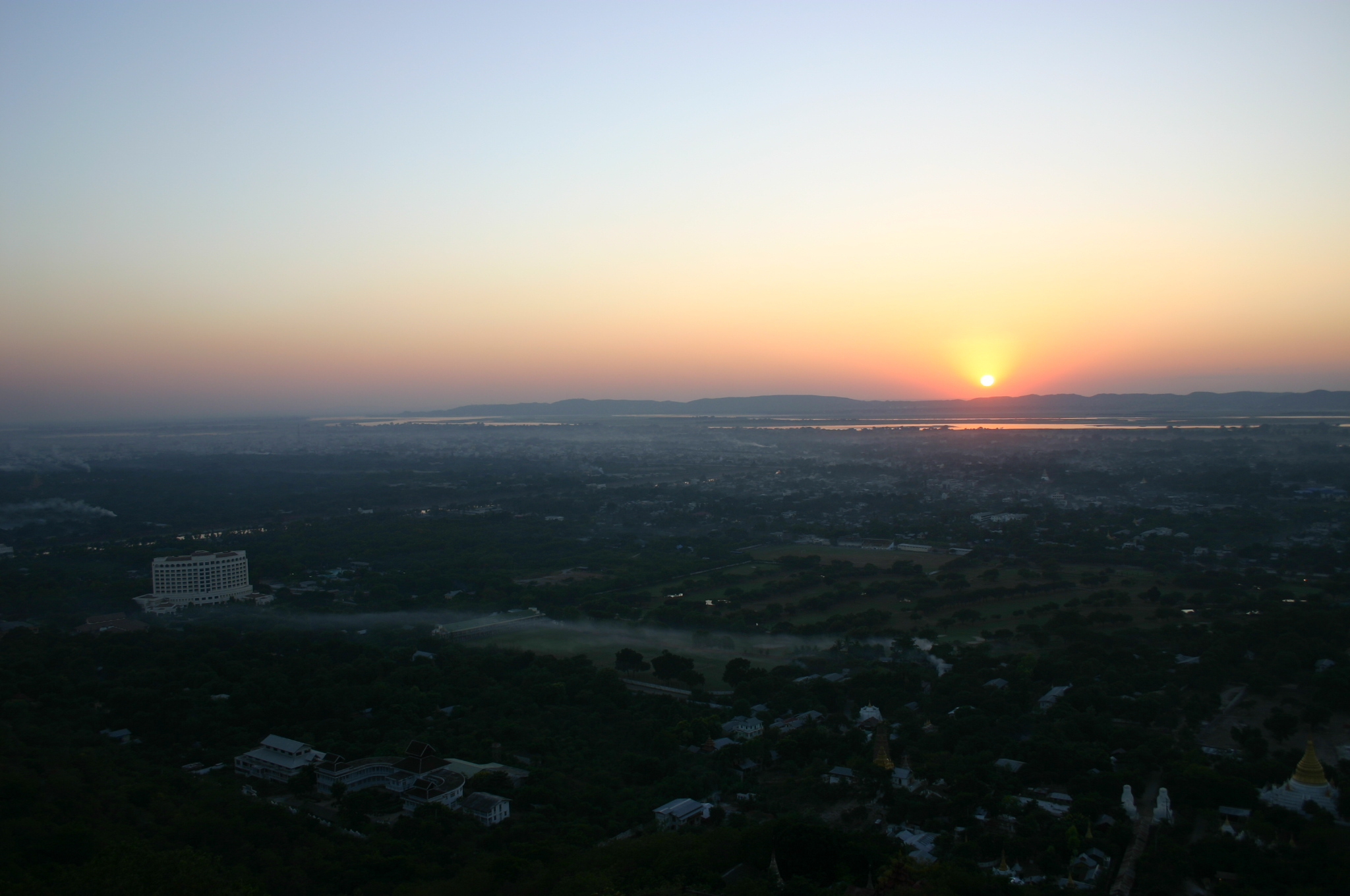
Sunset from Mandalay Hill

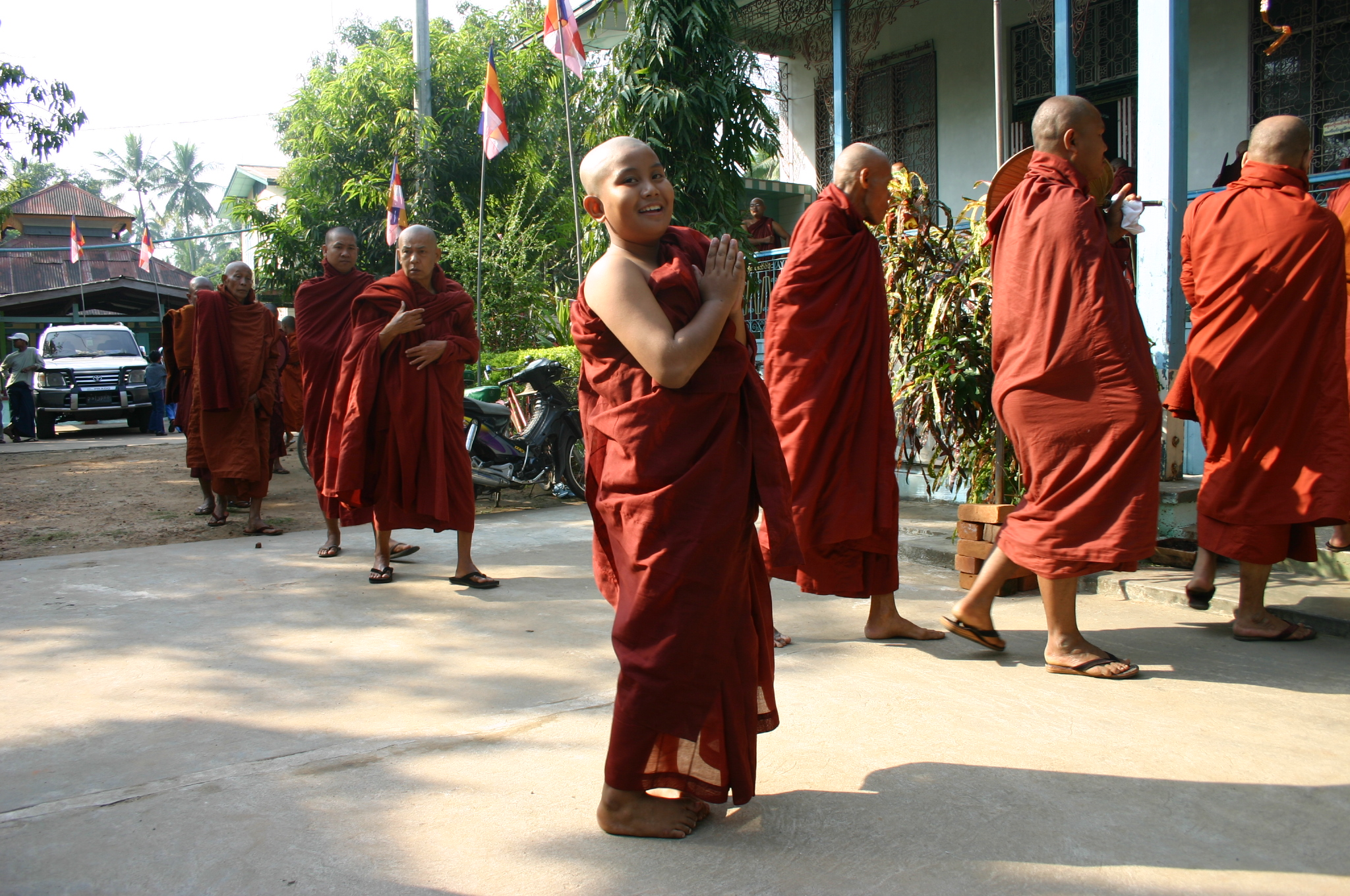
Monks at Buddhist Temple

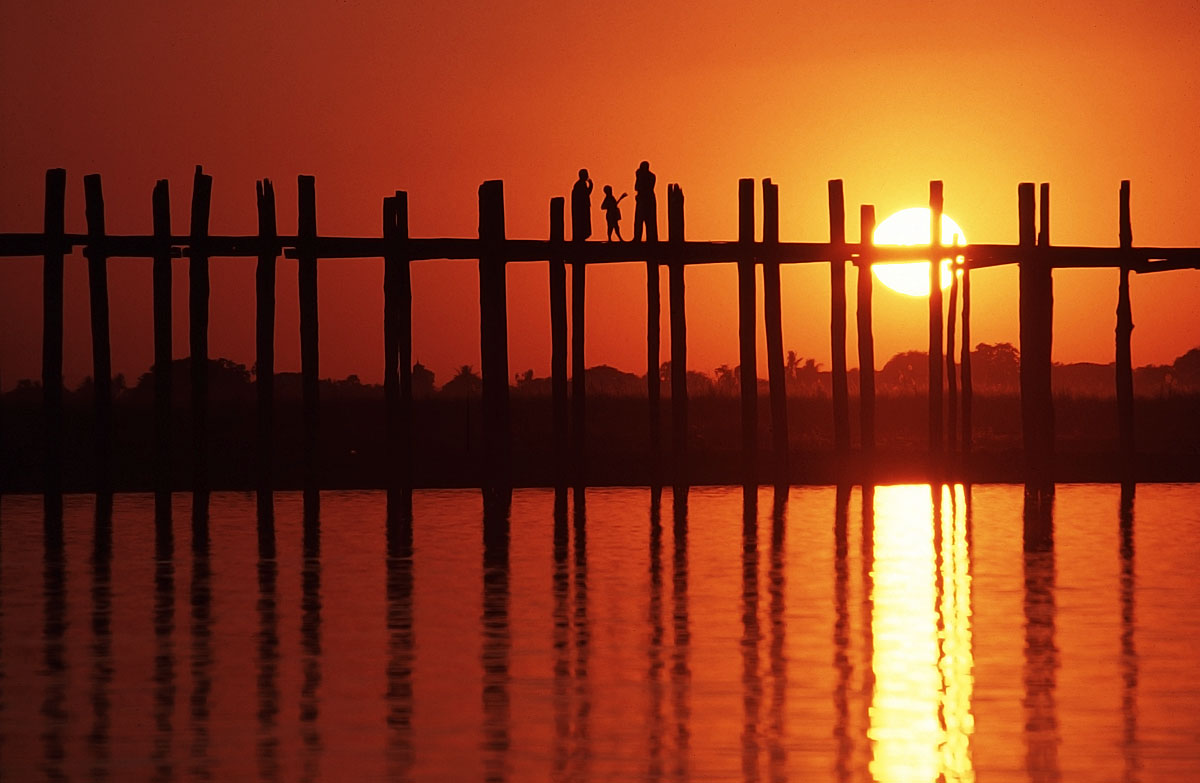
Sunset from U Bain bridge

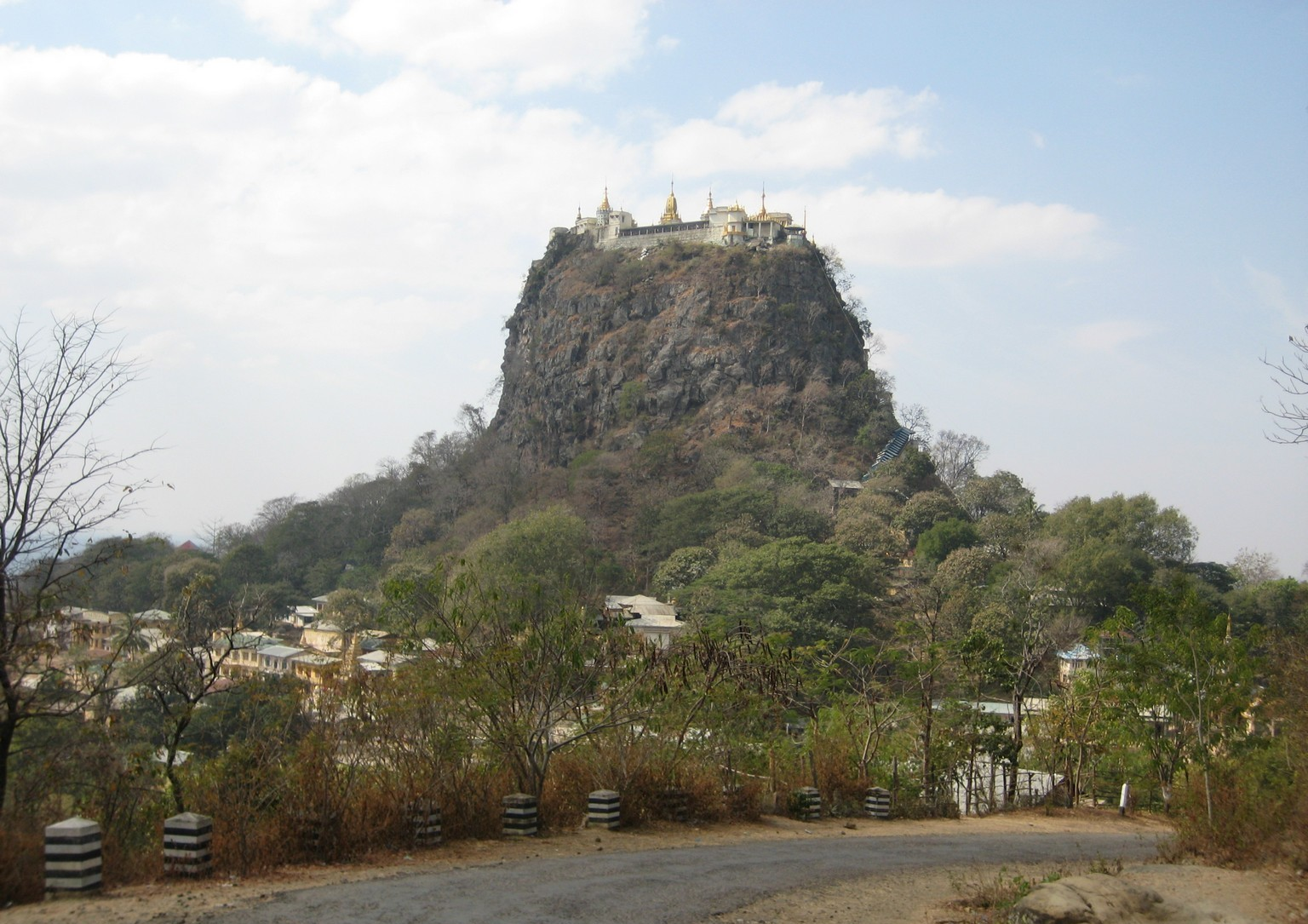
Mt. Popa

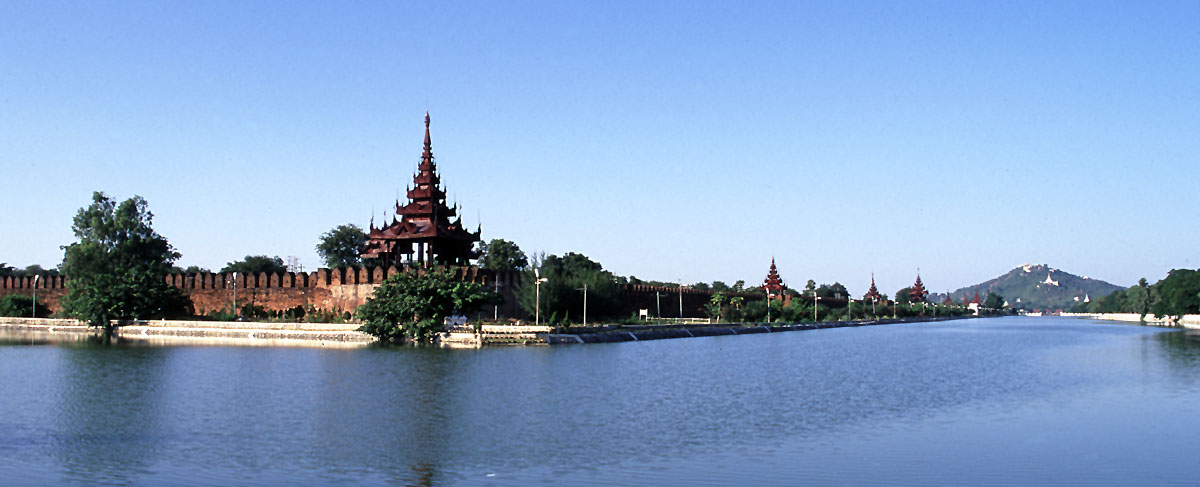
Mandalay Hill, Moat

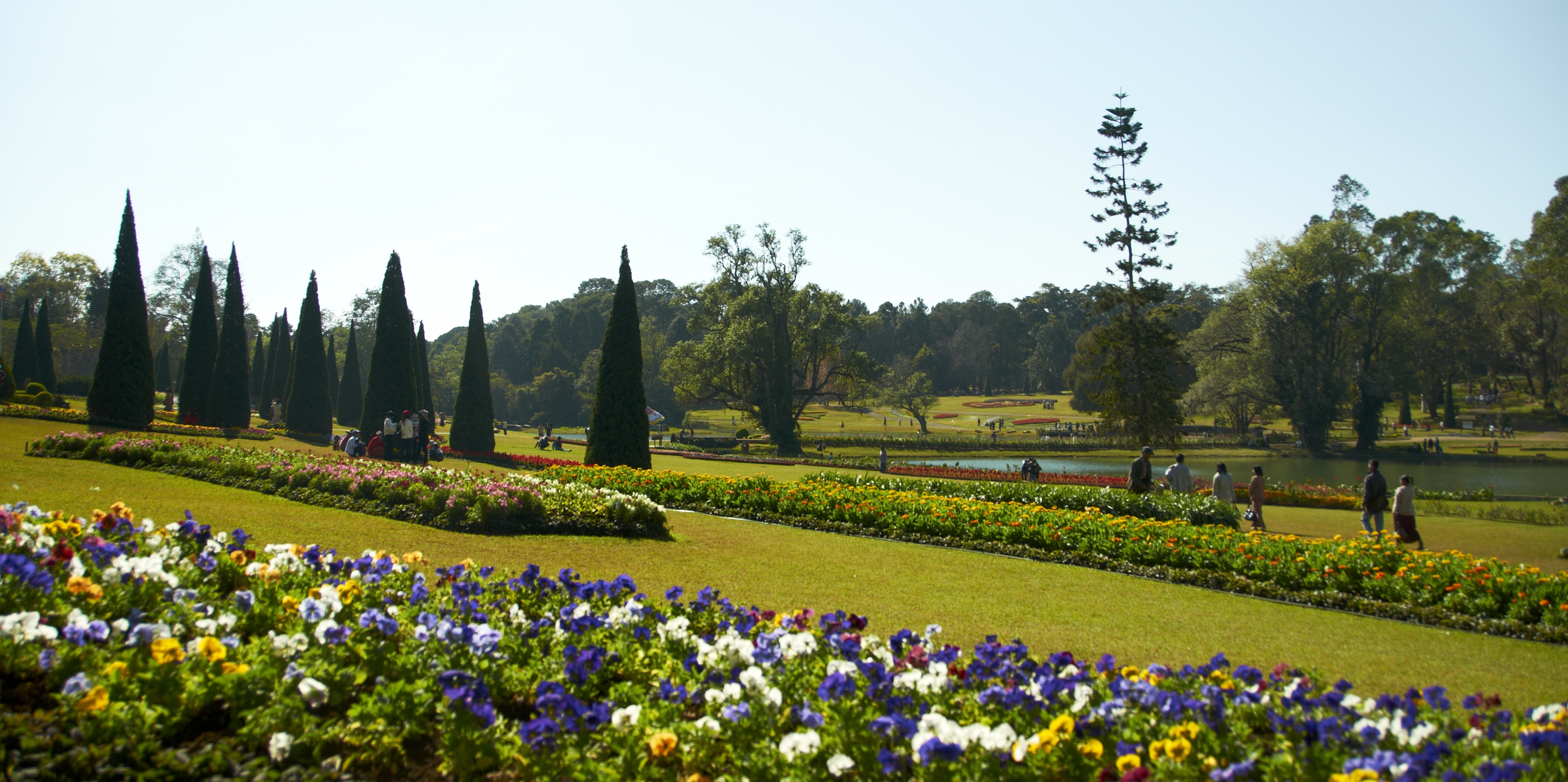
Pyin Oo Lwin National Kandawgyi Garden

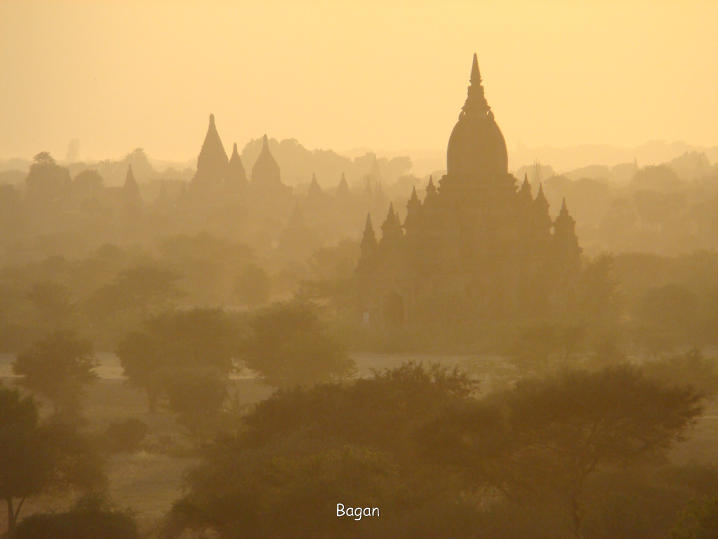
Bagan
