= 2020 Myanmar general election =

- 8 November 2020

315 of the 440 seats in the Pyithu Hluttaw 221 seats needed for a majority 161 of the 224 seats in the Amyotha Hluttaw 113 seats needed for a majority
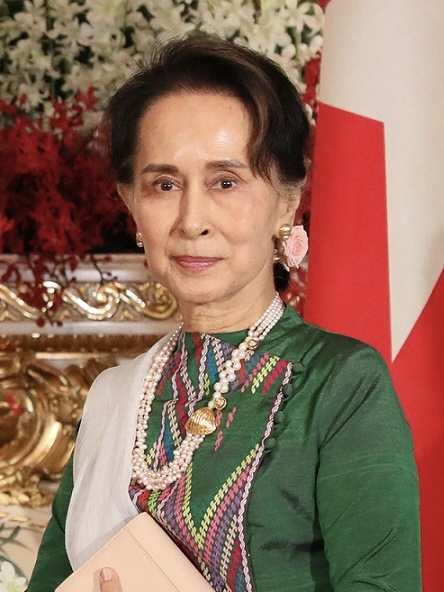

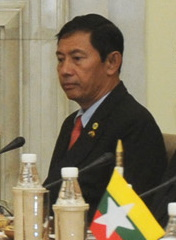
| | First party | Second party |
|---|---|---|
| Leader | Aung San Suu Kyi | Than Htay |
| Party | NLD | USDP |
| Leader since | 27 September 1988 | 23 August 2016 |
| Leader's seat | Kawhmu | Ran in Zeyathiri |
| Last election | 255 R / 135 N | 30 R / 11 N |
| Seats won | 258 R / 138 N | 26 R / 7 N |
| Seat change | ▲3 R / ▲3 N | ▼4 R / ▼4 N |
- Results of the election in the Pyithu Hluttaw, Amyotha Hluttaw, as well as State and Regional Hluttaws
President before election
Win Myint
NLD
President after election
Election results annulled
Myint Swe (USDP) named
Acting President

General elections were held in Myanmar on 8 November 2020. Voting occurred in all constituencies, excluding seats appointed by or reserved for the military, to elect members to both the upper house — the Amyotha Hluttaw (the House of Nationalities) and the lower house — the Pyithu Hluttaw (the House of Representatives) of the Assembly of the Union, as well as State and Regional Hluttaws (legislatures). Ethnic Affairs Ministers were also elected by their designated electorates on the same day, although only select ethnic minorities in particular states and regions were entitled to vote for them. A total of 1,171 national, state, and regional seats were contested in the election, with polling having taken place in all townships, including areas considered conflict zones and self-administered regions.

On 1 February 2021, the Tatmadaw (Myanmar Armed Forces) baselessly claimed the results of the election were illegitimate and launched a coup d'état that deposed State Counsellor Aung San Suu Kyi and President Win Myint, causing military-affiliated Vice President Myint Swe to become Acting President. Myint Swe was then able to formally hand power to coup leader Min Aung Hlaing under the Constitution's state of emergency provisions. The military later annulled the results of the 2020 election, and pledged to hold new elections by 2023, though it later controversially prolonged the state of emergency, further delaying the elections. The next election occurred in December 2025-January 2026, in which the NLD did not participate.

== Background ==
The prior elections in 2015 were only the second to be considered at least semi-democratic in the country since 1960 (the first being in 1990, which the military invalidated), as for a majority of its independent history, it was either controlled by a totalitarian dictatorship or a military junta. The National League for Democracy, led by Aung San Suu Kyi, won a majority of seats and votes, taking 86 percent of the seats in the Assembly of the Union (235 in the House of Representatives and 135 in the House of Nationalities), well more than the 67 percent supermajority needed to ensure that its preferred candidates would be elected president and second vice president in the Presidential Electoral College. The party technically also needed at least 67 percent to outvote the combined pro-military bloc in the Presidential Electoral College (the Union Solidarity and Development Party and the appointed legislators representing the military). Although NLD leader Aung San Suu Kyi is constitutionally barred from the presidency (as both her late husband and her children are foreign citizens), she was the de facto head of government, after being appointed to a newly created office, the State Counsellor of Myanmar, a position akin to a Prime Minister. Most political parties in the country are ethnically-based, with only two (the NLD and the USDP) having large sway at the national level, although both are dominated by the ethnic Bamar majority. Parties also tend to be based more on personality (based on the attitudes and personality of their leaders) rather than a stable ideological platform.

Statistics for share of the popular vote appear not to be available.

The election took place during the COVID-19 pandemic, as well as both the Rohingya conflict and the Rohingya genocide (alongside international condemnation for these events). In addition, the government has also been criticised for restricting press freedom and having failed to deal with the country's economic issues, putting dents in its electoral promise of reform.

=== Rohingya conflict ===
Aung San Suu Kyi and the National League for Democracy's actions since being elected in 2015 have been described by international media and international organisations including the United Nations, International Criminal Court, and Amnesty International as failing to stop the persecution of the Rohingya people, a Muslim minority group mainly in Rakhine State, although it is unclear how much say they actually have, regardless of their relative silence on the matter. The actions of the military, who are said to hold the real power in the region, have been described as crimes against humanity and a genocide. Over 25,000 people have been killed in the conflicts, with tens of thousands more being injured or subjected to sexual violence, in addition to over 725,000 people having fled the country, mostly to neighboring Bangladesh. Media activity in the province is heavily restricted by the government. The Rohingya are currently classed as stateless people, as Myanmar refuses to give them citizenship, claiming they are illegal immigrants from Bangladesh, despite evidence suggesting they have been present in the area for centuries. In the rare cases that Rohingya individuals do possess citizenship, the government routinely refuses to acknowledge the validity of documents they provide.

=== Economic issues ===
According to the IMF:

- Myanmar has seen a sharp decline in exports, remittances, and tourist arrivals due to the COVID-19 pandemic. Domestic economic activity has also been constrained by measures taken to control the spread of the virus. Additionally, nearly four out of five workers in Myanmar are employed in the informal sector, with limited access to social safety nets to help cope with any economic fallout.
- Natural gas comprised 40 percent of exports and 20 percent of government revenues in fiscal year 2018/19, and due to a drop in prices in 2020, the current account and fiscal position of the country became even more strained.
- The Burmese kyat, in contrast to trends elsewhere in the region, has appreciated in value. "The country's trade deficit had narrowed for about a year, leading to exchange rate appreciation pressures. This trend has now started to unwind. This may continue as imports pick up and the economy is projected to recover. At the same time, Myanmar’s foreign exchange intervention rule, adopted late last year, has facilitated accumulation of foreign exchange reserves, which remain inadequate."

In addition, some construction and infrastructure projects have been either delayed or cancelled due to supply and demand shocks as a result of the COVID-19 pandemic, including the US$1 billion Yangon Elevated Expressway and the development of the US$8–10 billion Dawei Special Economic Zone and accompanying US$137.1 million Dawei-Htee Kee Road linking the zone to Ratchaburi in Thailand. The government has also not been able to muster up enough funds to put together a stimulus package, only allocating the equivalent of around US$72 million to assist small- and medium-sized enterprises compared to the tens of billions allocated in nearby countries like Thailand. Prior to the pandemic, some areas of the country's economy had been highlighted as trouble spots, including bank lending and tourism. GDP growth is expected to decline nearly 7% from the prior year, with overall GDP expected to about break even with the prior year due to the pandemic.

=== COVID-19 pandemic ===
Despite only reporting around 300 confirmed cases of COVID-19 nationwide as of early July 2020, Myanmar has limited testing capacity, so the true extent of the spread of the virus is still unknown. Regardless, authorities implemented strict containment measures early on, including travel restrictions, closure of land borders, and bans on mass public gatherings. Nevertheless, the number of confirmed cases has ballooned to more than 50,000 by November 2020.

=== Constitutional reform ===
In January 2019, the National League for Democracy pushed for constitutional reform, but was unsuccessful because any changes required 75% approval in the legislature, and 25% of seats are reserved for the military. Outside of these seats, the pro-military USDP was also unlikely to go along (as well as other minor parties potentially being unwilling), meaning any proposals were dead on arrival.

== Electoral system ==
All offices elected by popular vote are contested under a first-past-the-post system, in which a candidate needs only a plurality of votes in a constituency to be elected. All candidates must be citizens of Myanmar. One-quarter of seats in both houses of the Assembly of the Union and one-third of seats in state and regional legislatures are reserved for the military under the 2008 Constitution, and three ministries (Home Affairs, Border Affairs, and Defense) of the national government formed following the election must be headed by a military appointee. After the new legislators take office, the President and the two Vice Presidents of Myanmar are elected by the Presidential Electoral College, made up of MPs from three committees: one of elected members from each house of the Assembly of the Union, and one from the military-appointed members. Each committee recommends one candidate, and the Assembly then holds a vote. The position the candidates are elected to depends on their overall vote total (the highest vote-getter becomes President, while the second-highest becomes First Vice President, and the remaining candidate becomes Second Vice President). People married to a non-Burmese citizen and/or who have children without Burmese citizenship are barred from being elected to any presidential position. Elected officials will take office in March 2021. For a majority, a party or coalition(s) require 221 seats in the House of Representatives and 113 seats in the House of Nationalities.

On 29 June 2020, the Union Election Commission (UEC) announced the constituency reapportionment for the 168 non-appointed seats of the House of Nationalities (Amyotha Hluttaw), 330 non-appointed seats of the House of Representatives (Pyithu Hluttaw), 644 non-appointed seats of the State and Regional Hluttaws and 29 Ethnic Affair Ministers. The UEC also announced in which constituencies elections would be fully or partially cancelled on 16 October 2020 and 27 October 2020. Elections were fully cancelled in 15 townships and partially in 41.

Elections were fully cancelled in:

- 9 townships in Rakhine State
- 6 townships in Shan State

Elections were partially cancelled in:

- 2 townships and 42 village-tracts in Bago Region
- 1 township and 94 village-tracts in Chin State
- 11 townships and 192 village-tracts in Kachin State
- 6 townships and 53 village-tracts in Kayin State
- 1 township and 1 village-tract in Mon State
- 4 townships, 15 wards and 130 village tracts in Rakhine State
- 16 townships, 8 wards and 130 village tracts in Shan State

Constituencies of the 2020 Myanmar general election
| | Pyithu Hluttaw (House of Representatives) constituencies allocated | Amyotha Hluttaw (House of Nationalities) constituencies allocated | State and Regional Hluttaws (State and Regional Assemblies) constituencies allocated | Ethnic Affairs Ministers constituencies allocated |
|---|---|---|---|---|
| Ayeyarwady Region | 26 | 12 | 52 | 2 |
| Bago Region | 28 | 12 | 56 | 1 |
| Chin State | 9 | 12 | 18 | 0 |
| Kachin State | 18 | 12 | 36 | 4 |
| Kayah State | 7 | 12 | 14 | 1 |
| Kayin State | 7 | 12 | 14 | 3 |
| Magway Region | 25 | 12 | 50 | 1 |
| Mandalay Region (Note: Including Naypyidaw Union Territory) | 36 | 12 | 56 | 1 |
| Mon State | 10 | 12 | 20 | 3 |
| Rakhine State | 17 | 12 | 34 | 1 |
| Sagaing Region | 37 | 12 | 74 | 2 |
| Shan State | 55 | 12 | 110 | 7 |
| Tanintharyi Region | 10 | 12 | 20 | 1 |
| Yangon Region | 45 | 12 | 90 | 2 |
| Total | 330 | 168 | 644 | 29 |

== Opinion polls ==
Opinion polling is generally rare in Myanmar, meaning there is not much data on public opinion, although questions have occasionally been asked on political and other matters.

Question: In general, would you say our country is heading in the right or wrong direction?

| Date | Polling firm | Publisher | Right direction | Wrong direction | Don't know / No response |
|---|---|---|---|---|---|
| July 2019 | Center for Insights in Survey Research | International Republican Institute | 77 | 19 | 5 |
| April 2017 | Center for Insights in Survey Research | International Republican Institute | 75 | 16 | 9 |

The main item a majority felt the country was headed in the right direction with was infrastructure, while the main reasons people felt the country was headed in the wrong direction included increasing prices of goods, continuing poor economic conditions, and ethnic violence. Illicit drug use and crime were also cited as major problems in the 2019 poll.

Question: How would you describe the current economic situation in the country?

| Date | Polling firm | Publisher | Very good | Somewhat good | Somewhat bad | Very bad | Don't know / No response |
|---|---|---|---|---|---|---|---|
| July 2019 | Center for Insights in Survey Research | International Republican Institute | 10 | 51 | 25 | 9 | 5 |
| April 2017 | Center for Insights in Survey Research | International Republican Institute | 10 | 53 | 22 | 9 | 6 |

Question: As of now, in order to amend the Constitution it would require the support of more than 75% of parliament. Do you support or oppose making it easier to change the Constitution by amending this requirement?

| Date | Polling firm | Publisher | Strongly support | Somewhat support | Somewhat oppose | Strongly oppose | Don't know / No response |
|---|---|---|---|---|---|---|---|
| July 2019 | Center for Insights in Survey Research | International Republican Institute | 43 | 37 | 4 | 5 | 11 |
| April 2017 | Center for Insights in Survey Research | International Republican Institute | 48 | 32 | 4 | 5 | 11 |

Most respondents who supported making it easier to change the Constitution also supported changing the requirement that spouses and any children of a candidate be citizens in order to be eligible for the presidency.

Question: Do you support giving the states and regions more autonomy and power so that they can make decisions for themselves, or do you think that all power and decisions should be centralized and made by the union government?

| Date | Polling firm | Publisher | More regional autonomy | Centralized power | Don't know / No response |
|---|---|---|---|---|---|
| July 2019 | Center for Insights in Survey Research | International Republican Institute | 22 | 70 | 8 |
| April 2017 | Center for Insights in Survey Research | International Republican Institute | 23 | 67 | 10 |

Despite most respondents preferring more centralized power at the national level, slightly over half felt that states/regions should have more control over natural resources located within their boundaries.

== Conduct ==
A month before the November elections, Human Rights Watch issued a report noting multiple issues with the upcoming election, characterizing it as "fundamentally flawed." Its report noted the NLD government's extensive use of state media to promote its political platform, while opposition parties were not given as many chances to do so. Of the opposition campaign materials that were broadcast on state media, some had portions censored by the election commission, which was controlled by the NLD government. Residents without citizenship documents were barred from voting in the election, which disproportionately affected the Rohingya, Burmese Indians and Sino-Burmese communities. Townships in conflict areas faced denial of internet access for months before the election. The report additionally took issue with 25% of the seats in parliament being reserved for the military.

The 2020 election was observed by domestic and international election observers. In total, the Union Election Commission accredited 7,232 observers from 13 domestic groups at the union-level, an additional 985 observers from 23 groups at the state and region levels. International observers included the Asian Network for Free Elections (ANFREL), the Carter Center, the European Union, and the government of Japan, totaling 61 international observers, 182 diplomatic observers, and 53 staff from IFES and International IDEA.

A coalition of 12 domestic election observer groups found the election results credible, reflecting the will of the majority of voters. The coalition also noted weaknesses in Myanmar's electoral legal framework, including the 2008 Constitution, and found some inconsistencies in electoral administration and election administration amid the ongoing pandemic.

The Carter Center assessment did not find any major irregularities with conduct at polling stations. A team of 43 observers had visited 234 polling stations across 10 of Myanmar's 14 states and regions. The Carter Center praised the Union Election Commission's efforts to update the voter roll, train election officials, and adapt procedures for older voters during the COVID-19 pandemic. It also noted the UEC's failure to provide timely access to election data, and that election postponements and cancellations stopped voting for 1.4 million citizens, leaving 24 seats vacant.

== Results ==
=== Amyotha Hluttaw ===
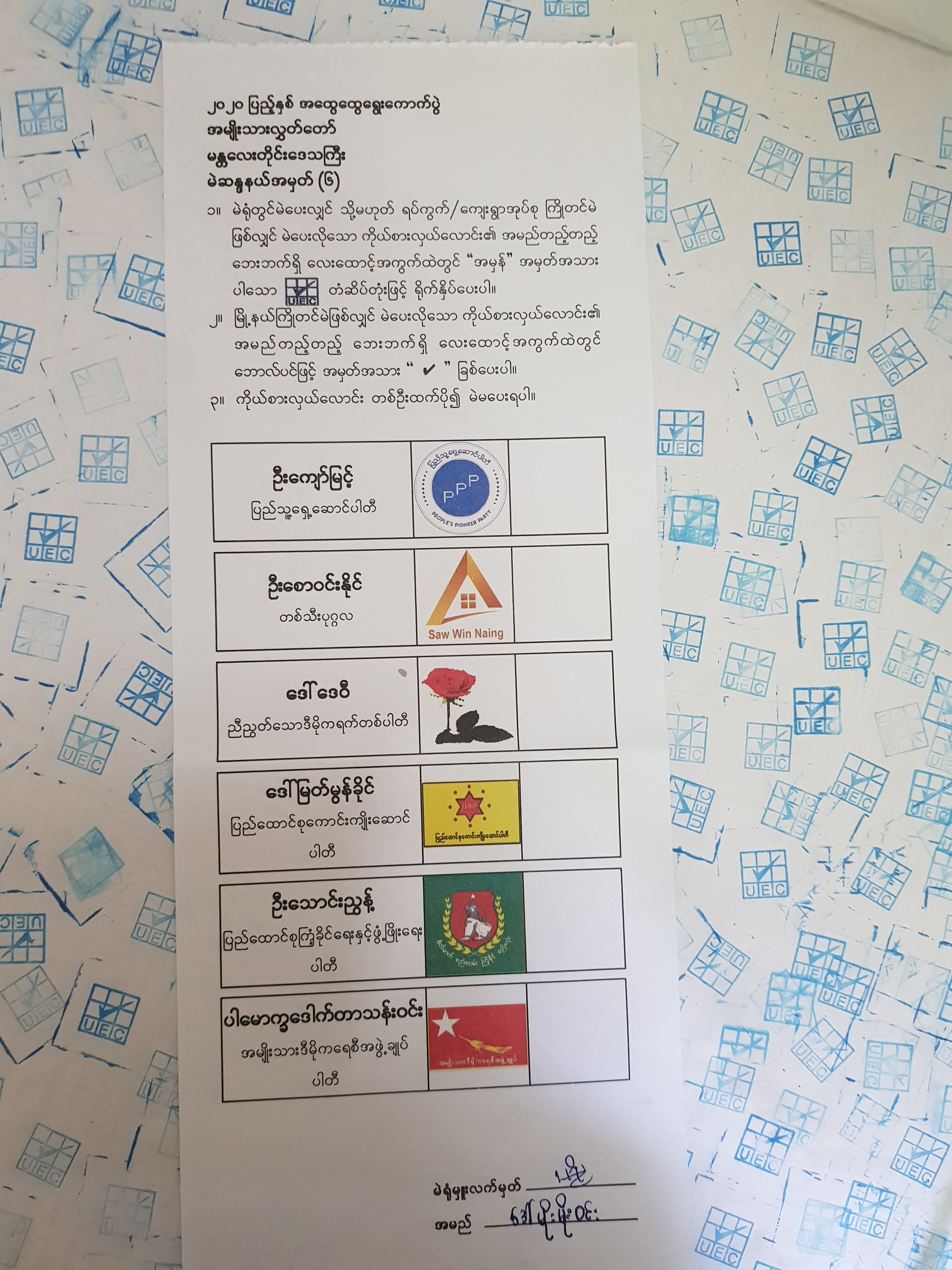
A ballot paper for the Mandalay No. 6 House of Nationalities constituency

| Party | Votes | % | Seats |
|---|---|---|---|
| National League for Democracy | 18,259,248 | 68.31 | 138 |
| Union Solidarity and Development Party | 5,923,457 | 22.16 | 7 |
| Shan Nationalities League for Democracy | 414,073 | 1.55 | 2 |
| Union Betterment Party | 385,116 | 1.44 | 0 |
| Mon Unity Party | 281,933 | 1.05 | 3 |
| Pa-O National Organisation | 171,255 | 0.64 | 1 |
| Kayin National Democratic Party | 109,952 | 0.41 | 0 |
| Ta'ang National Party | 102,894 | 0.38 | 2 |
| Arakan National Party | 102,201 | 0.38 | 4 |
| Shan Nationalities Democratic Party | 99,853 | 0.37 | 0 |
| Kachin State People's Party | 94,277 | 0.35 | 0 |
| Chin National League for Democracy | 70,673 | 0.26 | 0 |
| National Unity Party | 64,193 | 0.24 | 0 |
| People's Pioneer Party | 60,444 | 0.23 | 0 |
| Tai-Leng Nationalities Development Party | 54,398 | 0.20 | 0 |
| Union Pa-O National Organization | 44,302 | 0.17 | 0 |
| Kayin People's Party | 37,623 | 0.14 | 0 |
| Shan-ni Solidarity Party | 36,968 | 0.14 | 0 |
| Kayah State Democratic Party | 30,298 | 0.11 | 3 |
| Arakan League for Democracy Party | 27,656 | 0.10 | 0 |
| Arakan Front Party | 27,099 | 0.10 | 0 |
| National Political Democratic Party | 24,224 | 0.09 | 0 |
| Lisu National Development Party | 23,797 | 0.09 | 0 |
| National Democratic Force | 22,017 | 0.08 | 0 |
| Kayan National Party | 19,280 | 0.07 | 0 |
| Public Contribute Students Party | 16,699 | 0.06 | 0 |
| Danu National Democracy Party | 15,814 | 0.06 | 0 |
| People's Party | 15,325 | 0.06 | 0 |
| People's Party of Myanmar Farmers and Workers | 15,308 | 0.06 | 0 |
| Zomi Congress for Democracy | 14,275 | 0.05 | 0 |
| Naga National Party | 13,624 | 0.05 | 0 |
| Wa National Party | 13,621 | 0.05 | 0 |
| Myanmar New Society Democratic Party | 11,486 | 0.04 | 0 |
| United Nationalities Democracy Party | 9,554 | 0.04 | 0 |
| New Democratic Party (Kachin) | 9,245 | 0.03 | 1 |
| Ethnic National Development Party | 7,493 | 0.03 | 0 |
| Lahu National Development Party | 6,670 | 0.02 | 0 |
| Kachin National Party | 6,365 | 0.02 | 0 |
| Kachin National Congress | 5,243 | 0.02 | 0 |
| Federal Union Party | 4,766 | 0.02 | 0 |
| Democratic Party | 4,394 | 0.02 | 0 |
| Alliance of Myanmar's Worker and Farmer Party | 3,687 | 0.01 | 0 |
| Lhaovo National Unity and Development Party | 3,234 | 0.01 | 0 |
| National United Democratic Party | 2,797 | 0.01 | 0 |
| Myanmar Farmers Development Party | 2,770 | 0.01 | 0 |
| Yeomanry Development Party | 2,734 | 0.01 | 0 |
| Shan State Kokang Democratic Party | 2,310 | 0.01 | 0 |
| Rakhine State National United Party | 1,844 | 0.01 | 0 |
| Public of Labour Party | 1,055 | 0.00 | 0 |
| Danu National Organization Party | 817 | 0.00 | 0 |
| 88 Generation Democracy Party | 792 | 0.00 | 0 |
| Karen National Party | 670 | 0.00 | 0 |
| Khumi (Khami) National Party | 624 | 0.00 | 0 |
| Union Farmer-Labour Force Party | 601 | 0.00 | 0 |
| Zo National Region Development Party | 236 | 0.00 | 0 |
| Independent | 48,874 | 0.18 | 0 |
| Cancelled due to insurgency | | | 7 |
| Military appointees | | | 56 |
| Total | 26,730,158 | 100.00 | 224 |
| Valid votes | 26,730,158 | 97.22 | |
| Invalid/blank votes | 765,397 | 2.78 | |
| Total votes | 27,495,555 | 100.00 | |
| Registered voters/turnout | 38,271,447 | 71.84 | |
Source: UEC

The list of military appointees was published as the UEC Announcement 2/2016.

==== By constituencies ====
House of Nationalities (Amyotha Hluttaw) results by constituency
| Constituency | NLD | USDP | SNLD | UBP | MUP | PNO | KNDP | TNP | ANP | SNDP | KSPP | CNLD | NUP | PPP | TLNDP | UPNO | KPP | SNSP | KSDP | ALDP | AFP | NPDP | LNDP | NDF | KNP | PCSP | DNDP | PP | PPMFW | ZCD | NNP | WNP | MNSDP | UNDP | KNDP | ENDP | LNDP | KNP | KNC | FUP | DP | AMWFP | LNUDP | NUDP | MFDP | YDP | SSKDP | RSNUP | PLP | DNOP | 88GDP | KNP | KNP | UFLFP | ZNRDP | Ind | Invalid | Electorate |
|---|---|---|---|---|---|---|---|---|---|---|---|---|---|---|---|---|---|---|---|---|---|---|---|---|---|---|---|---|---|---|---|---|---|---|---|---|---|---|---|---|---|---|---|---|---|---|---|---|---|---|---|---|---|---|---|---|---|---|
| Kachin No. 1 | 14,226 | 14,496 | | | | | | | | | 8,878 | | 6,239 | | | | | | | | | | 4,713 | | | | | | | | | | | | | | | | | | | | | | | | | | | | | | | | | | 1,389 | 61,764 |
| Kachin No. 2 | 37,944 | 16,837 | | 565 | | | | | | 3,527 | 5,518 | | | 870 | 4,159 | | | | | | | | | | | | | | | | | | | | | | | | | | | | | | | | | | | | | | | | | | 1,685 | 94,244 |
| Kachin No. 3 | 41,501 | 22,668 | | 1,783 | | | | | | 4,238 | 6,278 | | 1,711 | | | | | | | | | | | | | | | | | | | | | | | | | | | | | | | | | | | | | | | | | | | | 5,328 | 108,269 |
| Kachin No. 4 | 10,566 | 6,053 | 6,168 | | | | | | | 1,606 | 3,365 | | | | 2,882 | | | | | | | | | | | | | | | | | | | | | | | | 3,107 | | | | | | | | | | | | | | | | | | 1,193 | 50,300 |
| Kachin No. 5 | 65,229 | 11,575 | | | | | | | | | 19,579 | | | | 4,208 | | | | | | | | | | | | | | | | | | | | | | | | | | | | | | | | | | | | | | | | | | 2,775 | 184,062 |
| Kachin No. 6 | 35,130 | 17,914 | | 891 | | | | | | | 9,541 | | | | 5,159 | | | | | | | | | | | | | | | | | | | | | | | | | | | | | | | | | | | | | | | | | | 1,571 | 104,535 |
| Kachin No. 7 | 37,001 | 8,450 | | 441 | | | | | | | 1,351 | | 619 | | 6,247 | | | 3,135 | | | | | | | | | | | | | | | | | | | | | | | | | | | | | | | | | | | | | | | 1,168 | 82,894 |
| Kachin No. 8 | 27,368 | 8,665 | | 551 | | | | | | | 1,758 | | | | 12,883 | | | 1,257 | | | | | | | | | | | | | | | | | | | | | | | | | | | | | | | | | | | | | | | 1,460 | 77,929 |
| Kachin No. 9 | 4,188 | | | | | | | | | | 1,220 | | | | | | | | | | | | | | | | | | | | | | | | 6,065 | | | | | | | | 758 | | | | | | | | | | | | | 1,712; 154 | 604 | 19,332 |
| Kachin No. 10 | 8,321 | 7,567 | | | | | | | | | 3,282 | | 427 | | | | | | | | | | 2,447 | | | | | | | | | | | | | | | | | | | | | | | | | | | | | | | | | | 731 | 34,349 |
| Kachin No. 11 | 67,972 | 27,907 | | 1,482 | | | | | | | 25,607 | | | | 6,494 | | | | | | | | | | | 6,081 | | | | | | | | | | | | | | | | | | | | | | | | | | | | | | | 3,694 | 238,576 |
| Kachin No. 12 | 22,748 | 9,190 | 3,762 | 1,289 | | | | | | 942 | 7,900 | | 702 | | 1,758 | | | | | | | | | | | | | | | | | | | | 3,180 | | | | 2,136 | | | | 2,476 | | | | | | | | | | | | | | 2,151 | 94,153 |
| Kayah No. 1 | 2,181 | 1,603 | | 90 | | | | | | | | | | | | | | | 609 | | | 34 | | 38 | | | | | | | | | | | | | | | | | | | | | | | | | | | | | | | | | 165 | 6,416 |
| Kayah No. 2 | 2,754 | 849 | | 42 | | | | | | | | | | | | | | | 610 | | | 120 | | 48 | | | | | | | | | | | | | | | | | | | | | | | | | | | | 670 | | | | | 668 | 10,496 |
| Kayah No. 3 | 1,099 | 1,498 | | 181 | | | | | | | | | 319 | | | | | | 287 | | | 67 | | 127 | | | | | | | | | | | | | | | | | | | | | | | | | | | | | | | | | 77 | 4,333 |
| Kayah No. 4 | 919 | 1,445 | | 124 | | | | | | | | | 388 | | | | | | 487 | | | 19 | | 16 | | | | | | | | | | | | | | | | | | | | | | | | | | | | | | | | | 144 | 3,874 |
| Kayah No. 5 | 2,331 | 761 | 221 | 182 | | | | | | | | | | | | | | | 560 | | | | | 45 | | | | | | | | | | | | | | | | | | | | | | | | | | | | | | | | 89 | 244 | 5,275 |
| Kayah No. 6 | 11,949 | 1,918 | | 373 | | | | | | | | | 367 | | | | | | 8,589 | | | | | 286 | | | | | | | | | | | | | | | | | | | | | | | | | | | | | | | | | 773 | 29,778 |
| Kayah No. 7 | 12,857 | 2,008 | | 819 | | | | | | | | | | | | | | | | | | 178 | | 247 | 4,778 | | | | | | | | | | | | | | | | | | | | | | | | | | | | | | | | 823 | 26,896 |
| Kayah No. 8 | 1,858 | 1,345 | | 163 | | | | | | | | | 268 | | | | | | 4,055 | | | | | 90 | | | | | | | | | | | | | | | | | | | | | | | | | | | | | | | | 269 | 391 | 10,648 |
| Kayah No. 9 | 1,572 | 908 | | 245 | | | | | | | | | | | | | | | 2,425 | | | | | 33 | | | | | | | | | | | | | | | | | | | | | | | | | | | | | | | | 326; 244 | 486 | 9,305 |
| Kayah No. 10 | 813 | 1,194 | | 321 | | | | | | | | | | | | | | | 1,755 | | | | | 34 | | | | | | | | | | | | | | | | | | | | | | | | | | | | | | | | | 193 | 5,628 |
| Kayah No. 11 | 19,127 | 5,240 | 369 | 641 | | 2,153 | | | | | | | 712 | | | | | | 7,026 | | | 283 | | 423 | | | | | | | | | | | | | | | | | | | | | | | | | | | | | | | | | 1,468 | 49,800 |
| Kayah No. 12 | 22,769 | 7,548 | 294 | 638 | | | | | | | | | 765 | | | | | | 3,895 | | | 226 | | 306 | | | | | 742 | | | | | | | | | | | | | | | | | | | | | | | | | | | | 1,132 | 50,467 |
| Karen No. 1 | 25,705 | 10,939 | | 841 | | | 11,820 | | | | | | | | | | | | | | | | | | | | | | | | | | | | | | | | | | | | | | | | | | | | | | | | | | 2,125 | 97,887 |
| Karen No. 2 | 20,256 | 7,097 | | 536 | 15,631 | | 7,029 | | | | | | | | | | | | | | | | | | | | | | | | | | | | | | | | | | | | | | | | | | | | | | | | | | 3,103 | 107,469 |
| Karen No. 3 | 19,217 | 5,799 | | 743 | 4,495 | | 4,904 | | | | | | | | | | | | | | | | | | | | | | | | | | | | | | | | | | | | | | | | | | | | | | | | | | 1,902 | 66,475 |
| Karen No. 4 | 17,636 | 7,232 | | 334 | 9,719 | | 9,021 | | | | | | | | | | | | | | | | | | | | | | | | | | | | | | | | | | | | | | | | | | | | | | | | | | 2,272 | 97,491 |
| Karen No. 5 | 6,092 | 7,741 | | 365 | | | 1,278 | | | | | | | | | | | | | | | | | | | | | | | | | | | | | | | | | | | | | | | | | | | | | | | | | | 562 | 22,830 |
| Karen No. 6 | 57,337 | 11,772 | | 1,725 | 11,014 | | 13,836 | | | | | | | | | | | | | | | | | | | | | | | | | | | 765 | | | | | | | | | | | | | | | | | | | | | | 2,032 | 3,733 | 184,458 |
| Karen No. 7 | 58,541 | 16,944 | | 1,515 | | | 18,686 | | | | | | | | | | | | | | | | | | | | | | | | | | | 1,326 | | | | | | | | | | | | | | | | | | | | | | 3,220 | 9,400 | 186,294 |
| Karen No. 8 | 32,873 | 7,653 | | 946 | | | 14,744 | | | | | | | | | | | | | | | | | | | | | | | | | | | | | | | | | | | | | | | | | | | | | | | | | 1,102 | 3,227 | 115,759 |
| Karen No. 9 | 20,146 | 13,091 | | 663 | | | 20,141 | | | | | | | | | | | | | | | | | | | | | | | | | | | | | | | | | | | | | | | | | | | | | | | | | | 4,705 | 123,861 |
| Karen No. 10 | 18,050 | 5,782 | | 908 | | | | | | | | | | | | | 14,300 | | | | | | | | | | | | | | | | | | | | | | | | | | | | | | | | | | | | | | | | 1,905 | 62,289 |
| Karen No. 11 | 30,353 | 9,645 | | 379 | | | 5,878 | | | | | | 424 | 409 | | | | | | | | | | | | | | | | | | | | | | | | | | | | | | | | | | | | | | | | | | | 1,792 | 103,455 |
| Karen No. 12 | 23,505 | 5,025 | | 225 | | | 2,615 | | | | | | 332 | 329 | | | | | | | | | | | | | | | | | | | | | | | | | | | | | | | | | | | | | | | | | | | 876 | 68,570 |
| Chin No. 1 | 8,727 | 5,254 | | 185 | | | | | | | | 933 | | | | | | | | | | | | | | | | | | 5,052 | | | | | | | | | | | | | | | | | | | | | | | | | | | 521 | 28,140 |
| Chin No. 2 | 10,542 | 4,393 | | 114 | | | | | | | | 532 | 181 | | | | | | | | | | | | | | | | | 4,822 | | | | | | | | | | | | | | | | | | | | | | | | | | | 1,086 | 28,624 |
| Chin No. 3 | 5,620 | 831 | | 273 | | | | | | | | 2,014 | | | | | | | | | | | | | | | | | | 4,401 | | | | | | | | | | | | | | | | | | | | | | | | | 236 | 1,983 | 286 | 17,827 |
| Chin No. 4 | 15,317 | 2,885 | | | | | | | | | | 8,992 | | | | | | | | | | | | | | | | | | | | | | | | | | | | | | | | | | | | | | | | | | | | | 528 | 39,273 |
| Chin No. 5 | 4,729 | 3,434 | | 175 | | | | | | | | 3,085 | | | | | | | | | | | | | | | | | | | | | | | | | | | | | | | | | | | | | | | | | | | | | 267 | 14,712 |
| Chin No. 6 | 12,685 | 5,963 | | 639 | | | | | | | | 4,620 | | | | | | | | | | | | | | | | | | | | | | | | | | | | | | | | | | | | | | | | | | | | 173 | 587 | 30,706 |
| Chin No. 7 | 1,284 | 1,255 | | | | | | | | | | 264 | | | | | | | | | | | | | | | | | | | | | | | | 1,202 | | | | | | | | | | | | | | | | | 228 | | | | 180 | 8,384 |
| Chin No. 8 | 2,026 | 1,543 | | | | | | | | | | 1,296 | | | | | | | | | | | | | | | | | | | | | | | | | | | | | | | | | | | | | | | | | 396 | | | 198 | 229 | 7,613 |
| Chin No. 9 | 15,262 | 2,099 | | | | | | | | | | 7,689 | | | | | | | | | | | | | | | | | | | | | | | | 6,291 | | | | | | | | | | | | | | | | | | | | | 1,065 | 38,019 |
| Chin No. 10 | 15,492 | 5,579 | | | | | | | | | | 5,681 | | | | | | | | | | | | | | | | | | | | | | | | | | | | | | | | | | | | | | | | | | | | | 848 | 33,806 |
| Chin No. 11 | 8,152 | 1,399 | | | | | | | | | | 5,286 | | | | | | | | | | | | | | | | | | | | | | | | | | | | | | | | | | | | | | | | | | | | | 480 | 19,689 |
| Chin No. 12 | 7,515 | | | | | | | | | | | 7,450 | | | | | | | | | | | | | | | | | | | | | | | | | | | | | | | | | | | | | | | | | | | | | 564 | 19,515 |
| Sagaing No. 1 | 197,069 | 76,078 | | 1,514 | | | | | | | | 18,422 | 4,602 | | | | | | | | | | | | | | | | | | | | | | | | | | | | | | | | | | | | | | | | | | | 617 | 5,995 | 417,587 |
| Sagaing No. 2 | 197,761 | 81,259 | | 5,373 | | | | | | | | | | | | | | | | | | | | | | | | | | | | | | | | | | | | | | | | | | | | | | | | | | | | | 10,833 | 382,432 |
| Sagaing No. 3 | 151,780 | 47,545 | | 2,546 | | | | | | | | | | | | | | | | | | | | | | | | 2,121 | | | | | | | | | | | | | | | | | | | | | | | | | | | | | 5,082 | 254,904 |
| Sagaing No. 4 | 173,476 | | | 21,967 | | | | | | | | | | | | | | | | | | | | | | | | | | | | | | | | | | | | | | | | | | | | | | | | | | | | | 47,639 | 315,203 |
| Sagaing No. 5 | 69,830 | 18,460 | | 2,162 | | | | | | | | | | | 10,608 | | | 32,576 | | | | | | | | | | | | | | | | | | | | | | | | | | | | | | | | | | | | | | | 5,793 | 199,087 |
| Sagaing No. 6 | 287,475 | 57,728 | | 1,244 | | | | | | | | | 2,389 | 1,712 | | | | | | | | | | | | | | | | | | | | | | | | | | | | | | | | | | | | | | | | | | | 3,886 | 433,644 |
| Sagaing No. 7 | 35,454 | 20,736 | | 231 | | | | | | | | 2,782 | 512 | | | | | | | | | | | | | | | | | | | | | | | | | | | | | | | | | | | | | | | | | | | | 1,322 | 84,384 |
| Sagaing No. 8 | 443,097 | 60,067 | | 5,521 | | | | | | | | | | | | | | | | | | | | | | | | | | | | | | 1,471 | | | | | | | | | | | | | | | | | | | | | | 804 | 7,394 | 643,103 |
| Sagaing No. 9 | 52,081 | 37,290 | | 1,676 | | | | | | | | | 2,541 | | | | | | | | | | | | | | | | | | | | | | | | | | | | | | | | | | | | | | | | | | | | 2,190 | 126,455 |
| Sagaing No. 10 | 302,980 | 63,603 | | 2,695 | | | | | | | | | | | | | | | | | | | | | | | | | | | | | | | | | | | | | | | | | | | | | | | | | | | | | 6,462 | 476,786 |
| Sagaing No. 11 | 588,560 | 115,675 | | 7,187 | | | | | | | | | | | | | | | | | | | | | | | | | | | | | | | | | | | | | | | | | | | | | | | | | | | | | 11,981 | 895,442 |
| Sagaing No. 12 | 23,671 | 21,146 | | 1,958 | | | | | | | | | | | | | | | | | | | | | | | | | | | 13,624 | | | | | | | | | | | | | | | | | | | | | | | | | | 2,808 | 76,376 |
| Tanintharyi No. 1 | 45,377 | 12,113 | | 1,380 | 2,719 | | | | | | | | 470 | | | | | | | | | | | | | | | | | | | | | | | | | | | | | | | | | | | | | | | | | 601 | | | 2,059 | 112,589 |
| Tanintharyi No. 2 | 28,125 | 11,121 | | 1,140 | | | | | | | | | | | | | | | | | | | | | | | | | | | | | | | | | | | | | | | | | | | | | | | | | | | | | 2,500 | 59,099 |
| Tanintharyi No. 3 | 66,633 | 14,077 | | 1,117 | | | | | | | | | | 877 | | | 1,869 | | | | | | | | | | | | | | | | | | | | | | | | | | | | | | | | | | | | | | | | 256 | 134,723 |
| Tanintharyi No. 4 | 50,172 | 12,727 | | 1,624 | | | | | | | | | | | | | | | | | | | | 1,936 | | | | | | | | | | | | | | | | | | | | | | | | | | | | | | | | | 4,608 | 114,174 |
| Tanintharyi No. 5 | 64,092 | 9,979 | | 1,089 | | | | | | | | | | | | | | | | | | | | | | | | | | | | | | | | | | | | | | | | | | | | | | | | | | | | | 1,029 | 127,574 |
| Tanintharyi No. 6 | 50,286 | 11,887 | | 1,744 | | | | | | | | | | | | | | | | | | | | | | | | | | | | | | | | | | | | | | | | | | | | | | | | | | | | 550 | 1,679 | 106,436 |
| Tanintharyi No. 7 | 30,305 | 11,503 | | 759 | | | | | | | | | 481 | | | | | | | | | | | | | | | | | | | | | | | | | | | | | | | | | | | | | | | | | | | | 1,162 | 54,920 |
| Tanintharyi No. 8 | 31,756 | 8,990 | | 580 | | | | | | | | | | | | | 513 | | | | | | | | | | | | | | | | | | | | | | | | 482 | | | | | | | | | | | | | | | | 1,534 | 59,241 |
| Tanintharyi No. 9 | 44,159 | 7,421 | | 1,501 | | | | | | | | | 1,066 | 415 | | | | | | | | | | | | | | | | | | | | | | | | | | | | | | | | | | | | | | | | | | 3,416 | 2,639 | 82,313 |
| Tanintharyi No. 10 | 56,849 | 14,261 | | 2,635 | | | | | | | | | | | | | | | | | | | | | | | | | | | | | | | | | | | | | | | | | | | | | | | | | | | | | 3,498 | 114,023 |
| Tanintharyi No. 11 | 65,192 | 11,274 | | 2,202 | | | | | | | | | 777 | 1,070 | | | 423 | | | | | | | | | | | | | | | | | | | | | | | | | | | | | | | | | | | | | | | | 1,580 | 114,163 |
| Tanintharyi No. 12 | 57,008 | 9,119 | | 3,844 | 1,412 | | | | | | | | 716 | 681 | | | | | | | | | | | | | | 586 | | | | | | | | | | | | | | | | | | | | | | | | | | | | | 2,682 | 112,635 |
| Bago No. 1 | 127,065 | 39,816 | | 26,465 | | | | | | | | | | | | | | | | | | | | | | | | | | | | | | | | | | | | | | | | | | | | | | | | | | | | | 6,974 | 298,569 |
| Bago No. 2 | 179,444 | 73,227 | | 4,186 | | | | | | | | | | | | | | | | | | | | | | | | | | | | | | | | | | | | | | | | | | | | | | | | | | | | | 7,677 | 366,922 |
| Bago No. 3 | 107,554 | 41,917 | | 3,521 | | | | | | | | | | | | | | | | | | | | | | | | | | | | | | | | | | | | | | | | | | | | | | | | | | | | | 3,829 | 228,960 |
| Bago No. 4 | 144,556 | 30,380 | | 6,542 | | | | | | | | | | | | | | | | | | | | | | | | | | | | | | | | | | | | | | 1,822 | | | | | | | | | | | | | | | 5,412 | 282,231 |
| Bago No. 5 | 172,255 | 40,924 | | 11,180 | | | | | | | | | | | | | 2,679 | | | | | | | | | | | | | | | | | | | | | | | | | | | | | | | | | | | | | | | | 6,875 | 366,783 |
| Bago No. 6 | 187,887 | 53,920 | | 5,241 | | | | | | | | | | | | | | | | | | | | | | | | | | | | | | | | | | | | | | | | | | | | | | | | | | | | | 6,048 | 389,998 |
| Bago No. 7 | 227,783 | 52,462 | | 2,352 | | | | | | | | | | | | | | | | | | 561 | | | | | | | | | | | | | | | | | | | | 1,865 | | | | | | | | | | | | | | | 2,847 | 412,631 |
| Bago No. 8 | 225,098 | 93,260 | | 2,582 | | | | | | | | | | | | | | | | | | | | | | | | | | | | | | 3,153 | | | | | | | | | | | | | | | | | | | | | | | 5,490 | 412,088 |
| Bago No. 9 | 192,751 | 58,369 | | 6,304 | | | | | | | | | | | | | | | | | | | | | | | | | | | | | | | | | | | | | | | | | | | | | | | | | | | | | 5,708 | 325,109 |
| Bago No. 10 | 157,766 | 63,774 | | 4,563 | | | | | | | | | | | | | | | | | | | | | | | | | | | | | | | | | | | | | | | | | | | | | | | | | | | | | 4,794 | 295,486 |
| Bago No. 11 | 170,789 | 55,015 | | 3,955 | | | | | | | | | | | | | | | | | | | | | | | | | | | | | | | | | | | | | | | | | | | | | | | | | | | | | 6,420 | 308,578 |
| Bago No. 12 | 130,892 | 52,275 | | 5,625 | | | | | | | | | | | | | | | | | | | | | | | | | | | | | | | | | | | | | | | | | | | | | 1,055 | | | | | | | | 4,042 | 264,282 |
| Magway No. 1 | 131,735 | 35,269 | | 3,713 | | | | | | | | 1,627 | | | | | | | | | | | | | | | | | | | | | | | | | | | | | | | | | | | | | | | | | | | | | 3,284 | 207,740 |
| Magway No. 2 | 212,013 | 40,767 | | 1,852 | | | | | | | | | | 1,187 | | | | | | | | 949 | | | | | | | | | | | | | | | | | | | | | | | | | | | | | | | | | | | 4,709 | 333,077 |
| Magway No. 3 | 214,369 | 53,799 | | 1,611 | | | | | | | | | | 1,192 | | | | | | | | | | | | | | | | | | | | | | | | | | | | | | | | | | | | | | | | | | | 6,575 | 360,115 |
| Magway No. 4 | 107,382 | 29,041 | | 1,270 | | | | | | | | | 1,486 | | | | | | | | | 10,021 | | | | | | | | | | | | | | | | | | | | | | | | | | | | | | | | | | | 2,455 | 193,236 |
| Magway No. 5 | 175,222 | 33,923 | | 1,886 | | | | | | | | | | | | | | | | | | 606 | | | | | | | | | | | | | | | | | | | | | | | | | | | | | | | | | | | 4,394 | 291,010 |
| Magway No. 6 | 119,085 | 35,171 | | 1,922 | | | | | | | | | 2,156 | | | | | | | | | 566 | | | | | | | | | | | | | | | | | | | | | | | | | | | | | | | | | | | 2,912 | 219,112 |
| Magway No. 7 | 200,948 | 29,979 | | 3,498 | | | | | | | | | 3,496 | | | | | | | | | | | | | | | | | | | | | | | | | | | | | | | | | | | | | | | | | | | | 5,299 | 328,381 |
| Magway No. 8 | 148,613 | 33,265 | | 1,828 | | | | | | | | | 1,759 | | | | | | | | | | | | | | | | | | | | | | | | | | | | | | | | | | | | | | | | | | | | 2,715 | 242,199 |
| Magway No. 9 | 159,567 | 49,687 | | 2,065 | | | | | | | | | | | | | | | | | | | | | | | | 743 | | | | | | | | | | | | | | | | | 2,770 | | | | | | | | | | | | 4,616 | 272,692 |
| Magway No. 10 | 169,124 | 50,353 | | 1,330 | | | | | | | | | | | | | | | | | | | | | | | | | | | | | | | | | | | | | | | | | | | | | | | | | | | | | 3,539 | 279,928 |
| Magway No. 11 | 158,335 | 70,282 | | 4,210 | | | | | | | | | | | | | | | | | | | | | | | | | | | | | | | | | | | | | | | | | | | | | | | | | | | | | 5,474 | 298,019 |
| Magway No. 12 | 162,623 | 46,159 | | 2,599 | | | | | | | | | | | | | | | | | | | | | | | | | | | | | | | | | | | | | | | | | | | | | | | | | | | | | 7,532 | 284,623 |
| Mandalay No. 1 | 367,670 | 122,924 | | 5,747 | | | | | | | | | | 2,576 | | | | | | | | | | | | | | | | | | | | | | | | | | | | | | | | | | | | | | | | | | | 6,890 | 590,278 |
| Mandalay No. 2 | 274,562 | 55,095 | | 2,951 | | | | | | | | | | | | | | | | | | | | | | | | | | | | | | | | | | | | | | | | | | | | | | | | | | | | | 6,269 | 443,351 |
| Mandalay No. 3 | 206,848 | 36,858 | | 2,998 | | | | 2,847 | | | | | | | | | | | | | | | 16,637 | | | | | | | | | | | | | | | | | | | | | | | | | | | | | | | | | | 6,908 | 377,812 |
| Mandalay No. 4 | 219,570 | 69,841 | | 3,192 | | | | | | | | | | | | | | | | | | | | | | | | | | | | | | | | | | | | | | | | | | | | | | | | | | | | 5,938 | 8,021 | 400,744 |
| Mandalay No. 5 | 378,812 | 48,154 | | 1,775 | | | | | | | | | | 2,822 | | | | | | | | 1,020 | | | | | | | | | | | | | | | | | | | | | | | | | | | | | | | | | | | 6,675 | 595,275 |
| Mandalay No. 6 | 450,689 | 60,336 | | 2,511 | | | | | | | | | | 2,909 | | | | | | | | | | | | | | | | | | | | | | | | | | | | | | | | | | | | | | | | | | 646 | 4,528 | 680,095 |
| Mandalay No. 7 | 169,635 | 120,801 | | 2,432 | | | | | | | | | | | | | | | | | | | | | | | | | | | | | | | | | | | | | | | | | | 742 | | | | | | | | | | | 6,590 | 381,221 |
| Mandalay No. 8 | 185,079 | 95,471 | | 2,662 | | | | | | | | | 3,931 | | | | | | | | | | | | | | | | | | | | | | | | | | | | | | | | | | | | | | | | | | | | 14,094 | 352,219 |
| Mandalay No. 9 | 416,410 | 105,810 | | 4,942 | | | | | | | | | 3,610 | | | | | | | | | | | | | | | | | | | | | | | | | | | | | | | | | | | | | | | | | | | | 11,645 | 705,347 |
| Mandalay No. 10 | 178,708 | 148,370 | | 2,761 | | | | | | | | | | | | | | | | | | | | | | | | | | | | | | | | | | | | | | | | | | | | | | | | | | | | | 7,701 | 415,129 |
| Mandalay No. 11 | 246,805 | 96,325 | | 4,577 | | | | | | | | | | | | | | | | | | 1,250 | | | | | | 1,541 | | | | | | | | | | | | | | | | 2,797 | | | | | | | | | | | | | 7,264 | 486,448 |
| Mandalay No. 12 | 183,879 | 129,454 | | 6,573 | | | | | | | | | | 2,462 | | | | | | | | | | | | | | | | | | | | | | | | | | | | | | | | 984 | | | | | | | | | | | 6,386 | 419,778 |
| Mon No. 1 | 40,331 | 17,459 | | 1,357 | 26,924 | | | | | | | | | | | | | | | | | | | | | | | | | | | | | | | | | | | | | | | | | | | | | | | | | | | | 6,954 | 183,685 |
| Mon No. 2 | 38,183 | 15,374 | | 816 | 18,333 | | | | | | | | | | | | | | | | | | | | | | | | | | | | | | | | | | | | | | | | | | | | | | | | | | | 274 | 1,009 | 132,552 |
| Mon No. 3 | 43,019 | 12,792 | | 303 | 44,918 | | | | | | | | 560 | | | | | | | | | | | | | | | | | | | | | | | | | | | | | | | | | | | | | | | | | | | | 2,088 | 182,302 |
| Mon No. 4 | 59,515 | 9,730 | | 456 | 7,414 | | | | | | | | | | | | | | | | | | | | | | | | | | | | | | | | | | | | | | | | | | | | | | | | | | | | 880 | 125,013 |
| Mon No. 5 | 50,897 | 16,986 | | 728 | 7,864 | | | | | | | | | | | | | | | | | 187 | | | | | | | | | | | | | | | | | | | | | | | | | | | | | | | | | | | 1,214 | 123,132 |
| Mon No. 6 | 16,048 | 4,031 | | 351 | 25,881 | | | | | | | | | | | | | | | | | | | | | | | | | | | | | | | | | | | | | | | | | | | | | | | | | | | 4,738; 1,437; 1,155 | 2,989 | 116,953 |
| Mon No. 7 | 30,184 | 5,371 | | 235 | 32,588 | | | | | | | | 268 | | | | | | | | | | | | | | | | | | | | | | | | | | | | | | | | | | | | | | | | | | | 108 | 1,649 | 118,639 |
| Mon No. 8 | 35,028 | 9,919 | | 732 | 32,645 | | | | | | | | | | | | | | | | | | | | | | | | | | | | | | | | | | | | | | | | | | | | | | | | | | | | 2,674 | 151,381 |
| Mon No. 9 | 54,849 | 21,550 | | 1,136 | 2,678 | | | | | | | | 1,713 | | | | | | | | | | | | | 4,202 | | | | | | | | | | | | | | | | | | | | | | | | | | | | | | | 3,822 | 138,366 |
| Mon No. 10 | 65,862 | 20,929 | | 1,310 | 27,688 | | | | | | | | 1,918 | | | | | | | | | 764 | | | | | | | | | | | | | | | | | | | | | | | | | | | | | | | | | | | 4,146 | 213,888 |
| Mon No. 11 | 57,750 | 22,881 | | 3,680 | | | | | | | | | 2,498 | | | | 3,661 | | | | | 611 | | | | | | | | | | | | | | | | | | | | | | | | | | | | | | | | | | | 3,837 | 149,614 |
| Mon No. 12 | 80,037 | 26,314 | | 1,313 | | 6,170 | | | | | | | 4,388 | | | | | | | | | 698 | | | | | | | | | | | | 868 | | | | | | | | | | | | | | | | | 792 | | | | | | 5,194 | 212,255 |
| Rakhine No. 1 | 6,886 | 7,593 | | | | | | | 19,309 | | | | | | | | | | | 9,654 | | | | | | | | | | | | | | | | | | | | | | | | | | | | | | | | | | | | 13,409 | 2,414 | 89,292 |
| Rakhine No. 2 | 8,254 | 14,602 | | | | | | | 23,063 | | | | | | | | | | | 11,396 | 7,854 | | | | | | | | | | | | | | | | | | | | | | | | | | | | | | | | | | | | 4,191 | 103,603 |
| Rakhine No. 3 | 2,726 | 9,077 | | | | | | | 25,701 | | | | | | | | | | | | 19,245 | | | | | | | | | | | | | | | | | | | | | | | | | | | | | | | | | | | | 2,372 | 107,232 |
| Rakhine No. 4 | Election not held | | | | | | | | | | | | | | | | | | | | | | | | | | | | | | | | | | | | | | | | | | | | | | | | | | | | | | | | | |
| Rakhine No. 5 | Election not held | | | | | | | | | | | | | | | | | | | | | | | | | | | | | | | | | | | | | | | | | | | | | | | | | | | | | | | | | |
| Rakhine No. 6 | Election not held | | | | | | | | | | | | | | | | | | | | | | | | | | | | | | | | | | | | | | | | | | | | | | | | | | | | | | | | | |
| Rakhine No. 7 | Election not held | | | | | | | | | | | | | | | | | | | | | | | | | | | | | | | | | | | | | | | | | | | | | | | | | | | | | | | | | |
| Rakhine No. 8 | Election not held | | | | | | | | | | | | | | | | | | | | | | | | | | | | | | | | | | | | | | | | | | | | | | | | | | | | | | | | | |
| Rakhine No. 9 | Election not held | | | | | | | | | | | | | | | | | | | | | | | | | | | | | | | | | | | | | | | | | | | | | | | | | | | | | | | | | |
| Rakhine No. 10 | Election not held | | | | | | | | | | | | | | | | | | | | | | | | | | | | | | | | | | | | | | | | | | | | | | | | | | | | | | | | | |
| Rakhine No. 11 | 62,612 | 22,563 | | | | | | | 29,139 | | | | | | | | | | | 3,453 | | | | | | | | | | | | | | | | | | | | | | | | | | | | 1,844 | | | | | | | | 2,041 | 4,546 | 155,878 |
| Rakhine No. 12 | 4,352 | 2,657 | | | | | | | 4,989 | | | | | | | | | | | 3,153 | | | | | | | | | | | | | | | | | | | | | | | | | | | | | | | | | | | | | 425 | 21,952 |
| Yangon No. 1 | 233,951 | 95,214 | | 4,556 | | | | | | | | | | 1,812 | | | | | | | | | | | | | | | | | | | | | | | | | | | | | | | | | | | | | | | | | | | 7,442 | 440,674 |
| Yangon No. 2 | 318,683 | 97,880 | | 6,076 | 10,010 | | | | | | | | | | | | | | | | | | | | | | | | | | | | | | | | | | | | 3,912 | | | | | | | | | | | | | | | | 10,311 | 654,017 |
| Yangon No. 3 | 262,386 | 64,553 | | 2,556 | | | | | | | | | | 5,151 | | | | | | | | | | | | | | | | | | | | | | | | | | | | | | | | | | | | | | | | | | | 4,339 | 525,752 |
| Yangon No. 4 | 279,866 | 34,014 | | 1,844 | | | | | | | | | 3,638 | 2,839 | | | | | | | | | | 2,781 | | | | | | | | | | | | | | | | | | | | | | | | | | | | | | | | 1,398 | 8,110 | 640,804 |
| Yangon No. 5 | 303,690 | 29,716 | | 2,875 | | | | | | | | | 2,947 | | | | | | | | | | | 3,542 | | | | 4,486 | | | | | | | | | | | | | | | | | | | | | | | | | | | | | 3,110 | 503,775 |
| Yangon No. 6 | 248,092 | 34,139 | | 2,646 | | | | | | | | | | 2,495 | | | | | | | | | | | | | | | | | | | | | | | | | | | | | | | | 1,008 | | | | | | | | | | | 5,525 | 462,402 |
| Yangon No. 7 | 347,503 | 43,384 | | 3,343 | | | | | | | | | | 4,525 | | | | | | | | | | | | | | | | | | | | 1,247 | | | | | | | | | | | | | | | | | | | | | | | 5,384 | 591,811 |
| Yangon No. 8 | 245,117 | 31,075 | | 3,812 | | | | | | | | | | | | | | | | | | | | | | | | | | | | | | | | | | | | | | | | | | | | | | | | | | | | | 3,962 | 418,700 |
| Yangon No. 9 | 321,199 | 72,339 | | 6,031 | | | | | | | | | | | | | | | | | | | | | | | | 2,323 | | | | | | | | | | | | | | | | | | | | | | | | | | | | | 6,515 | 521,171 |
| Yangon No. 10 | 330,104 | 98,019 | | 4,789 | | | | | | | | | | 2,682 | | | | | | | | | | | | 6,416 | | | | | | | 11,486 | | | | | | | | | | | | | | | | | | | | | | | | 11,876 | 608,662 |
| Yangon No. 11 | 226,509 | 25,565 | | 2,180 | | | | | | | | | | 9,976 | | | | | | | | | | | | | | | | | | | | | | | | | | | | | | | | | | | | | | | | | | | 2,924 | 396,154 |
| Yangon No. 12 | 217,626 | 18,887 | | 1,348 | | | | | | | | | | 3,947 | | | | | | | | | | | | | | 1,634 | | | | | | | | | | | | | | | | | | | | | | | | | | | | | 2,293 | 373,125 |
| Shan No. 1 | 109,491 | 49,108 | 109,437 | 5,376 | | | | 15,465 | | 25,897 | | | | | | | | | | | | | | | | | | | | | | | | | | | | | | | | | | | | | | | | | | | | | | | 10,644 | 474,055 |
| Shan No. 2 | 47,949 | 34,839 | 11,677 | 1,887 | | | | | | 2,706 | | | | 970 | | | | | | | | | | | | | | | | | | | | | | | | | | | | | | | | | | | | | | | | | | | 11,253 | 197,506 |
| Shan No. 3 | 63,286 | 63,760 | 20,914 | 1,225 | | | | | | 10,215 | | | | | | | | | | | | | | | | | | | | | | 1,930 | | | | | 6,670 | | | | | | | | | | | | | | | | | | | | 12,777 | 292,056 |
| Shan No. 4 | 339,467 | 176,206 | 24,713 | 7,430 | | | | | | | | | | 2,449 | | 23,855 | | | | | | | | 8,182 | 14,502 | | | | | | | | | | | | | | | 4,766 | | | | | | | | | | | | | | | | | 21,852 | 778,466 |
| Shan No. 5 | 21,843 | 36,400 | 46,169 | 3,744 | | | | 49,221 | | 16,034 | | | | | | | | | | | | | | | | | | | | | | | | | | | | 6,365 | | | | | | | | | | | | | | | | | | | 7,799 | 330,532 |
| Shan No. 6 | 65,782 | 67,445 | 81,951 | 1,808 | | | | 4,306 | | 13,133 | | | | | | | | | | | | 1,102 | | | | | | | 3,463 | | | 4,988 | | | | | | | | | | | | | | | | | | | | | | | | | 15,387 | 457,673 |
| Shan No. 7 | 43,389 | 70,776 | 108,398 | | | | | 6,788 | | 21,555 | | | | | | | | | | | | | | 2,774 | | | | | | | | | | | | | | | | | | | | | | | | | | | | | | | | | 20,330 | 476,164 |
| Shan No. 8 | 6,938 | 5,859 | | | | | | 24,267 | | | | | | | | | | | | | | | | | | | | | | | | | | | | | | | | | | | | | | | | | | | | | | | | | 2,347 | 64,781 |
| Shan No. 9 | 54,231 | 34,108 | | 2,664 | | | | | | | | | | | | | | | | | | | | 1,109 | | | 15,814 | | | | | | | | | | | | | | | | | | | | | | | 817 | | | | | | | 3,701 | 123,124 |
| Shan No. 10 | 46,776 | | | | | 162,932 | | | | | | | | | | 20,447 | | | | | | 4,962 | | | | | | | | | | | | | | | | | | | | | | | | | | | | | | | | | | | 19,270 | 322,038 |
| Shan No. 11 | 3,602 | 11,084 | | | | | | | | | | | | | | | | | | | | | | | | | | | | | | 6,703 | | | | | | | | | | | | | | | | | | | | | | | | | 2,124 | 34,225 |
| Shan No. 12 | | 22,985 | | | | | | | | | | | | | | | | | | | | | | | | | | | | | | | | | | | | | | | | | | | | | 2,310 | | | | | | | | | | 3,111 | 83,663 |
| Ayeyarwady No. 1 | 174,175 | 112,786 | | 9,116 | | | | | | | | | | | | | | | | | | | | | | | | | | | | | | | | | | | | | | | | | | | | | | | | | | | | | 8,557 | 380,788 |
| Ayeyarwady No. 2 | 183,027 | 72,574 | | 1,969 | | | | | | | | | | | | | | | | | | | | | | | | | 2,390 | | | | | | | | | | | | | | | | | | | | | | | | | | | | 6,543 | 347,968 |
| Ayeyarwady No. 3 | 235,968 | 118,890 | | 7,197 | | | | | | | | | | 4,087 | | | | | | | | | | | | | | | | | | | | | | | | | | | | | | | | | | | | | | | | | | | 9,557 | 513,392 |
| Ayeyarwady No. 4 | 150,716 | 100,928 | | 3,219 | | | | | | | | | | | | | | | | | | | | | | | | | | | | | | | | | | | | | | | | | | | | | | | | | | | | | 6,490 | 353,582 |
| Ayeyarwady No. 5 | 165,797 | 82,021 | | 2,614 | | | | | | | | | | | | | | | | | | | | | | | | | | | | | | | | | | | | | | | | | | | | | | | | | | | | | 6,993 | 367,324 |
| Ayeyarwady No. 6 | 197,663 | 113,568 | | 3,621 | | | | | | | | | | | | | | | | | | | | | | | | | | | | | | | | | | | | | | | | | | | | | | | | | | | | | 6,415 | 418,012 |
| Ayeyarwady No. 7 | 169,500 | 89,306 | | 6,478 | | | | | | | | | | | | | | | | | | | | | | | | | | | | | | | | | | | | | | | | | | | | | | | | | | | | | 7,379 | 347,340 |
| Ayeyarwady No. 8 | 100,661 | 49,785 | | 1,658 | | | | | | | | | | | | | 14,178 | | | | | | | | | | | | | | | | | 724 | | | | | | | | | | | | | | | | | | | | | | | 5,103 | 225,903 |
| Ayeyarwady No. 9 | 171,423 | 90,021 | | 7,500 | | | | | | | | | | | | | | | | | | | | | | | | | 8,713 | | | | | | | | | | | | | | | | | | | | | | | | | | | | 9,504 | 379,538 |
| Ayeyarwady No. 10 | 192,277 | 110,315 | | 5,620 | | | | | | | | | | | | | | | | | | | | | | | | | | | | | | | | | | | | | | | | | | | | | | | | | | | | | 10,503 | 446,388 |
| Ayeyarwady No. 11 | 217,785 | 97,683 | | 3,344 | | | | | | | | | | | | | | | | | | | | | | | | | | | | | | | | | | | | | | | | | | | | | | | | | | | | | 6,463 | 411,382 |
| Ayeyarwady No. 12 | 242,047 | 120,871 | | 5,676 | | | | | | | | | 2,817 | | | | | | | | | | | | | | | 1,891 | | | | | | | | | | | | | | | | | | | | | | | | | | | | 841 | 7,342 | 489,535 |

=== Pyithu Hluttaw ===
| Party | Votes | % | Seats |
|---|---|---|---|
| National League for Democracy | 18,146,943 | 68.04 | 258 |
| Union Solidarity and Development Party | 5,838,533 | 21.89 | 26 |
| Shan Nationalities League for Democracy | 413,183 | 1.55 | 13 |
| Union Betterment Party | 299,503 | 1.12 | 0 |
| Mon Unity Party | 264,839 | 0.99 | 2 |
| Pa-O National Organisation | 231,024 | 0.87 | 3 |
| National Unity Party | 126,725 | 0.48 | 0 |
| Kayin National Democratic Party | 110,627 | 0.41 | 0 |
| Arakan National Party | 97,100 | 0.36 | 4 |
| Kayin People's Party | 95,600 | 0.36 | 0 |
| Shan Nationalities Democratic Party | 94,155 | 0.35 | 0 |
| Ta'ang National Party | 91,568 | 0.34 | 3 |
| Kachin State People's Party | 85,050 | 0.32 | 1 |
| People's Pioneer Party | 71,131 | 0.27 | 0 |
| Tai-Leng Nationalities Development Party | 58,065 | 0.22 | 0 |
| Chin National League for Democracy | 50,551 | 0.19 | 0 |
| Arakan Front Party | 39,821 | 0.15 | 1 |
| Shan-ni Solidarity Party | 36,043 | 0.14 | 0 |
| People's Party | 34,060 | 0.13 | 0 |
| Kayah State Democratic Party | 33,781 | 0.13 | 2 |
| National Democratic Force | 32,848 | 0.12 | 0 |
| Danu National Democracy Party | 25,980 | 0.10 | 0 |
| National Political Democratic Party | 25,555 | 0.10 | 0 |
| Union Pa-O National Organization | 24,788 | 0.09 | 0 |
| Lisu National Development Party | 24,617 | 0.09 | 0 |
| Arakan League for Democracy Party | 23,548 | 0.09 | 0 |
| Kayan National Party | 18,209 | 0.07 | 0 |
| Naga National Party | 18,146 | 0.07 | 0 |
| Public Contribute Students Party | 16,049 | 0.06 | 0 |
| Zomi Congress for Democracy | 15,638 | 0.06 | 1 |
| Democratic Party | 10,260 | 0.04 | 0 |
| Kachin National Congress | 9,420 | 0.04 | 0 |
| Kokang Democracy and Unity Party | 9,273 | 0.03 | 0 |
| United Nationalities Democracy Party | 8,905 | 0.03 | 0 |
| Wa National Party | 8,849 | 0.03 | 1 |
| Inn National League Party | 8,023 | 0.03 | 0 |
| Myanmar National Congress Party | 7,990 | 0.03 | 0 |
| Democratic Party for a New Society | 7,498 | 0.03 | 0 |
| New Society Party | 7,163 | 0.03 | 0 |
| Lahu National Development Party | 5,942 | 0.02 | 0 |
| New National Democracy Party | 5,781 | 0.02 | 0 |
| Myanmar Farmers Development Party | 4,447 | 0.02 | 0 |
| Inn National Development Party | 4,288 | 0.02 | 0 |
| New Democratic Party (Kachin) | 3,992 | 0.01 | 0 |
| Yeomanry Development Party | 3,623 | 0.01 | 0 |
| People's Party of Myanmar Farmers and Workers | 3,489 | 0.01 | 0 |
| National Development Party | 2,972 | 0.01 | 0 |
| Union Farmer-Labour Force Party | 2,967 | 0.01 | 0 |
| People's Power Party | 2,523 | 0.01 | 0 |
| Myanmar New Society Democratic Party | 2,500 | 0.01 | 0 |
| Kachin National Party | 2,370 | 0.01 | 0 |
| Guiding Star Party | 2,302 | 0.01 | 0 |
| Rakhine State National United Party | 2,241 | 0.01 | 0 |
| Shan State Kokang Democratic Party | 2,137 | 0.01 | 0 |
| Federal Union Party | 2,059 | 0.01 | 0 |
| Wun Thar Nu Democratic Party | 1,832 | 0.01 | 0 |
| Lhaovo National Unity and Development Party | 1,818 | 0.01 | 0 |
| National Democratic Party for Development | 1,484 | 0.01 | 0 |
| Asho Chin National Party | 1,482 | 0.01 | 0 |
| National United Democratic Party | 1,471 | 0.01 | 0 |
| Danu National Organization Party | 1,279 | 0.00 | 0 |
| National Unity Congress Party | 1,169 | 0.00 | 0 |
| Women Party (Mon) | 955 | 0.00 | 0 |
| 88 Generation Democracy Party | 939 | 0.00 | 0 |
| New Era Union Party | 656 | 0.00 | 0 |
| Peace and Diversity Party | 553 | 0.00 | 0 |
| Phalon-Sawaw Democratic Party | 514 | 0.00 | 0 |
| Modern People Party | 496 | 0.00 | 0 |
| National Political Alliances Party | 448 | 0.00 | 0 |
| Peace and Democracy Party | 429 | 0.00 | 0 |
| Kaman National Progressive Party | 402 | 0.00 | 0 |
| United Democratic Party | 252 | 0.00 | 0 |
| Bamar People's Party | 220 | 0.00 | 0 |
| Zo National Region Development Party | 212 | 0.00 | 0 |
| Public of Labour Party | 182 | 0.00 | 0 |
| Myanmar People's Democratic Party | 114 | 0.00 | 0 |
| National Development and Peace Party | 89 | 0.00 | 0 |
| Independent | 77,946 | 0.29 | 0 |
| Cancelled due to insurgency | | | 15 |
| Military appointees | | | 110 |
| Total | 26,669,636 | 100.00 | 440 |
| Valid votes | 26,669,636 | 96.94 | |
| Invalid/blank votes | 843,219 | 3.06 | |
| Total votes | 27,512,855 | 100.00 | |
| Registered voters/turnout | 38,222,387 | 71.98 | |
Source: UEC

The list of military appointees was published as the UEC Announcement 1/2016.

==== By constituencies ====
House of Representatives (Pyithu Hluttaw) results by constituency
| State/Region | Constituency | NLD | USDP | SNLD | UBP | MUP | PNO | NUP | KNDP | ANP | KPP | SNDP | TNP | KSPP | PPP | TLNDP | CNLD | AFP | SNSP | PP | KSDP | NDF | DNDP | NPDP | UPNO | LNDP | ALDP | KNP | NNP | PCSP | ZCD | DP | KNC | KDUP | UNDP | WNP | INLP | MNCP | DPNS | NSP | LNDP | NNDP | MFDP | INDP | KNDP | YDP | PPMFW | NDP | UFLFP | PPP | MNSDP | KNP | GSP | RSNUP | SSKDP | FUP | WTNDP | LNUDP | NDPD | ACNP | NUDP | DNOP | NUCP | WP(M) | 88GDP | NEUP | PDP | PSDP | MPP | NPAP | PDP | KNPP | UDP | BPP | ZNRDP | PLP | MPDP | NDPP | Ind | Invalid | Electorate |
|---|---|---|---|---|---|---|---|---|---|---|---|---|---|---|---|---|---|---|---|---|---|---|---|---|---|---|---|---|---|---|---|---|---|---|---|---|---|---|---|---|---|---|---|---|---|---|---|---|---|---|---|---|---|---|---|---|---|---|---|---|---|---|---|---|---|---|---|---|---|---|---|---|---|---|---|---|---|---|---|---|---|
| Kachin State | 1 - Khao Lan Phu | 937 | 3,130 | | | | | 112 | | | | | | 436 | | | | | | | | | | | | 1,577 | | | | | | | | | | | | | | | | | | | | | | | | | | | | | | | | | | | | | | | | | | | | | | | | | | | | | 1,014 | 124 | 8,909 |
| Kachin State | 2 - Somprabum | 716 | 856 | | | | | | | | | | | 787 | | | | | | | | | | | | | | | | | | | | | | | | | | | | | | | | | | | | | | | | | | | | | | | | | | | | | | | | | | | | | | | | | | 112 | 2,786 |
| Kachin State | 3 - Naungmoon | 1,782 | 2,234 | | | | | | | | | | | 264 | | | | | | | | | | | | | | | | | | | | | | | | | | | | | | | | | | | | | | | | | | | | | | | | | | | | | | | | | | | | | | | | | | 88 | 4,899 |
| Kachin State | 4 - Putao | 12,025 | 6,207 | | 3,146 | | | 1,517 | | | | | | 3,726 | | | | | | | | | | | | 2,466 | | | | | | | 577 | | | | | | | | | | | | | | | | | | | | | | | | | | | | | | | | | | | | | | | | | | | | | | | 1,143 | 39,268 |
| Kachin State | 5 - Machanbaw | 1,627 | 1,553 | | | | | | | | | | | 1,334 | | | | | | | | | | | | 270 | | | | | | | | | | | | | | | | | | | | | | | | | | | | | | | | | | | | | | | | | | | | | | | | | | | | | | 183 | 5,902 |
| Kachin State | 6 - Bhamo | 37,815 | 16,832 | | 504 | | | | | | | 3,909 | | 5,345 | 680 | 3,691 | | | | | | | | | | | | | | | | | | | | | | | | | | | | | | | | | | | | | | | | | | | | | | | | | | | | | | | | | | | | | | | | 2,396 | 94,244 |
| Kachin State | 7 - Mansi | 7,700 | 9,248 | 5,507 | 508 | | | | | | | 2,302 | | 3,674 | | | | | | | | | | | | | | | | | | | | | | | | | | | | | | | | | | | | | | | | | | | | | | | | | | | | | | | | | | | | | | | | | | 2,101 | 42,581 |
| Kachin State | 8 - Momauk | 10,358 | 6,146 | 6,027 | | | | | | | | 1,537 | | 3,829 | | 2,825 | | | | | | | | | | | | | | | | | 2,719 | | | | | | | | | | | | | | | | | | | | | | | | | | | | | | | | | | | | | | | | | | | | | | | 1,530 | 50,300 |
| Kachin State | 9 - Shweku | 33,034 | 14,022 | | 1,145 | | | 994 | | | | | | 876 | | 399 | | | | | | | | | | | | | | | | | | | | | | | | | | | | | | | | | | | | | | | | | | | | | | | | | | | | | | | | | | | | | | | | 2,077 | 65,688 |
| Kachin State | 10 - Hpakant | 65,103 | 10,814 | | | | | | | | | | | 16,957 | | 3,670 | | | | | | | | | | | | | | | | | 3,345 | | | | | | | | | | | | | | | | | | | | | | | | | | | | | | | | | | | | | | | | | | | | | | 336 | 3,507 | 184,062 |
| Kachin State | 11 - Mogaung | 34,897 | 17,946 | | 814 | | | | | | | | | 9,253 | | 5,189 | | | | | | | | | | | | | | | | | | | | | | | | | | | | | | | | | | | | | | | | | | | | | | | | | | | | | | | | | | | | | | | | 2,242 | 104,535 |
| Kachin State | 12 - Mohnyin | 64,028 | 17,206 | | 709 | | | | | | | | | 2,915 | | 19,468 | | | 3,581 | | | | | | | | | | | | | | | | | | | | | | | | | | | | | | | | | | | | | | | | | | | | | | | | | | | | | | | | | | | | 955 | 3,819 | 160,823 |
| Kachin State | 13 - Chipwe | 3,165 | 4,690 | | | | | | | | | | | 548 | | | | | | | | | | | | 1,235 | | | | | | | | | | | | | | | | | | | | | | | | | | | | | | | | | | | | | | | | | | | | | | | | | | | | | | 563 | 12,963 |
| Kachin State | 14 - Sothlaw | 1,019 | | | 174 | | | | | | | | | 64 | | | | | | | | | | | | 593 | | | | | | | | | | | | | | | | | | | 900 | | | | | | | | | | | | | 229 | | | | | | | | | | | | | | | | | | | | | | 101 | 4,363 |
| Kachin State | 15 - Tanai | 8,489 | 7,613 | | | | | 376 | | | | | | 3,081 | | | | | | | | | | | | 2,327 | | | | | | | | | | | | | | | | | | | | | | | | | | | | | | | | | | | | | | | | | | | | | | | | | | | | | | 917 | 34,349 |
| Kachin State | 16 - Myitkyina | 71,713 | 25,488 | | 1,147 | | | | | | | | | 23,453 | | 5,256 | | | | | | | | | | 4,144 | | | | 2,617 | | | | | | | | | | | | | | | | | | | | | | | | | | | | | | | | | | | | | | | | | | | | | | | | | | 5,866 | 238,576 |
| Kachin State | 17 - Waingmaw | 22,156 | 8,248 | 4,106 | 874 | | | | | | | | | 7,784 | | 1,505 | | | | | | | | | | 4,753 | | | | | | | 2,220 | | | | | | | | | | | | 3,092 | | | | | | | | | | | | | | | | | | | | | | | | | | | | | | | | | | | 3,496 | 94,153 |
| Kachin State | 18 - Injangyang | 385 | 241 | | | | | | | | | | | 724 | | | | | | | | | | | | | | | | | | | | | | | | | | | | | | | | | | | | | | | | | | | | | | | | | | | | | | | | | | | | | | | | | | 71 | 2,006 |
| Kayah State | 19 - Hpa Saung | 4,918 | 2,289 | | 144 | | | | | | | | | | | | | | | | 1,019 | 90 | | 187 | | | | 924 | | | | | | | | | | | | | | | | | | | | | | | | | | | | | | | | | | | | | | | | | | | | | | | | | | | 73 | 863 | 16,912 |
| Kayah State | 20 - Bawlakhe | 2,062 | 3,269 | | 234 | | | 359 | | | | | | | | | | | | | 680 | 154 | | 61 | | | | | | | | | | | | | | | | | | | | | | | | | | | | | | | | | | | | | | | | | | | | | | | | | | | | | | | | 384 | 8,207 |
| Kayah State | 21 - Mae Sai | 2,211 | 751 | 196 | 162 | | | | | | | | | | | | | | | | | 55 | | | | | | 782 | | | | | | | | | | | | | | | | | | | | | | | | | | | | | | | | | | | | | | | | | | | | | | | | | | | | 277 | 5,275 |
| Kayah State | 22 - Demosso | 24,546 | 3,600 | | 1,243 | | | | | | | | | | | | | | | | 13,456 | 541 | | 464 | | | | | | | | | | | | | | | | | | | | | | | | | | | | | | | | | | | | | | | | | | | | | | | | | | | | | | | | 2,115 | 56,674 |
| Kayah State | 23 - Phruso | 3,227 | 2,264 | | 312 | | | | | | | | | | | | | | | | 6,478 | 146 | | | | | | | | | | | | | | | | | | | | | | | | | | | | | | | | | | | | | | | | | | | | | | | | | | | | | | | | | 881; 273 | 1,098 | 19,953 |
| Kayah State | 24 - Shataw | 841 | 1,245 | | 282 | | | | | | | | | | | | | | | | 1,689 | 45 | | | | | | | | | | | | | | | | | | | | | | | | | | | | | | | | | | | | | | | | | | | | | | | | | | | | | | | | | | 210 | 5,628 |
| Kayah State | 25 - Loikaw | 42,883 | 12,018 | 726 | 1,231 | | 2,788 | 1,229 | | | | | | | | | | | | | 10,459 | 649 | | 411 | | | | | | | | | | | | | | | | | | | | | | | | | | | | | | | | | | | | | | | | | | | | | | | | | | | | | | | | 3,363 | 100,267 |
| Karen State | 26 - Kawkareik | 43,923 | 18,070 | | 803 | 17,240 | | | 18,872 | | | | | | | | | | | | | | | | | | | | | | | | | | | | | | | | | | | | | | | | | | | | | | | | | | | | | | | | | | | | | | | | | | | | | | | 6,839 | 205,356 |
| Karen State | 27 - Kyar Inn Seikgyi | 36,961 | 12,386 | | 1,079 | 14,169 | | | 14,920 | | | | | | | | | | | | | | | | | | | | | | | | | | | | | | | | | | | | | | | | | | | | | | | | | | | | | | | | | | | | | | | | | | | | | | | 5,529 | 163,966 |
| Karen State | 28 - Hpapun | 5,968 | 7,753 | | 296 | | | | 1,291 | | | | | | | | | | | | | | | | | | | | | | | | | | | | | | | | | | | | | | | | | | | | | | | | | | | | | | | | | | | | | | | | | | | | | | | 728 | 22,830 |
| Karen State | 29 - Hpa-an | 128,675 | 29,325 | | 3,313 | | | | 32,684 | | | | | | 1,542 | | | | | | | | | | | | | | | | | | | | 2,052 | | | | | | | | | | | | | | | | | | | | | | | | | | | | | | | | | | | | | | | | | | | | 4,019 | 10,735 | 370,752 |
| Karen State | 30 - Hlaingbwe | 54,005 | 20,262 | | 1,465 | | | | 34,444 | | | | | | | | | | | | | | | | | | | | | | | | | | | | | | | | | | | | | | | | | | | | | | | | | | | | | | | | | | | | | | | | | | | | | | | 9,149 | 239,620 |
| Karen State | 31 - Thandaunggyi | 17,658 | 6,154 | | 1,072 | | | | | | 13,476 | | | | | | | | | | | | | | | | | | | | | | | | | | | | | | | | | | | | | | | | | | | | | | | | | | | | | | | | | | | | | | | | | | | | | 2,558 | 62,289 |
| Karen State | 32 - Myawaddy | 53,388 | 15,608 | | 522 | | | | 8,416 | | | | | | 746 | | | | | | | | | | | | | | | | | | | | | | | | | | | | | | | | | | | | | | | | | | | | | | | | | | | | | | | | | | | | | | | | | 3,603 | 172,025 |
| Chin State | 33 - Tetin | 19,799 | 9,154 | | 217 | | | 312 | | | | | | | | | 1,309 | | | | | | | | | | | | | | 9,726 | | | | | | | | | | | | | | | | | | | | | | | | | | | | | | | | | | | | | | | | | | | | | | | | | 1,880 | 56,764 |
| Chin State | 34 - Tonzhan | 5,832 | 860 | | 404 | | | | | | | | | | | | 1,965 | | | | | | | | | | | | | | 5,912 | | | | | | | | | | | | | | | | | | | | | | | | | | | | | | | | | | | | | | | | | | | | 212 | | | | | 459 | 17,827 |
| Chin State | 35 - Falam | 16,132 | 3,370 | | | | | | | | | | | | | | 6,775 | | | | | | | | | | | | | | | | | | | | | | | | | | | | | | | | | | | | | | | | | | | | | | | | | | | | | | | | | | | | | | 840 | 618 | 39,273 |
| Chin State | 36 - Kanpetlet | 5,127 | 3,804 | | 148 | | | | | | | | | | | | 2,292 | | | 34 | | | | | | | | | | | | | | | | | | | | | | | | | | | | | | | | | | | | | | | | | | | | | | | | | | | | | | | | | | | | 289 | 14,712 |
| Chin State | 37 - Mindat | 12,917 | 7,282 | | 220 | | | | | | | | | | | | 3,482 | | | | | | | | | | | | | | | | | | | | | | | | | | | | | | | | | | | | | | | | | | | | | | | | | | | | | | | | | | | | | | | 788 | 30,706 |
| Chin State | 38 - Paletwa | 3,549 | 3,346 | | | | | | | | | | | | | | 2,649 | | | | | | | | | | | | | | | | | | | | | | | | | | | | | | | | | | | | | | | | | | | | | | | | | | | | | | | | | | | | | | | 547 | 15,997 |
| Chin State | 39 - Matupi | 15,916 | 5,652 | | 1,872 | | | | | | | | | | | | 6,541 | | | | | | | | | | | | | | | | | | | | | | | | | | | | | | | | | | | | | | | | | | | | | | | | | | | | | | | | | | | | | | 1,145 | 1,065 | 38,019 |
| Chin State | 40 - Thantlang | 11,892 | 5,420 | | | | | | | | | | | | | | 6,925 | | | | | | | | | | | | | | | | | | | | | | | | | | | | | | | | | | | | | | | | | | | | | | | | | | | | | | | | | | | | | | 2,235 | 1,133 | 33,806 |
| Chin State | 41 - Hakha | 16,210 | 2,811 | | | | | | | | | | | | | | | | | | | | | | | | | | | | | | | | | | | | | | | | | | | | | | | | | | | | | | | | | | | | | | | | | | | | | | | | | | | | 10,686 | 1,152 | 39,204 |
| Sagaing Region | 42 - Kalay | 131,660 | 40,235 | | 908 | | | 2,623 | | | | | | | | | 14,462 | | | | | | | | | | | | | | | | | | | | | | | | | | | | | | | | | | | | | | | | | | | | | | | | | | | | | | | | | | | | | | 637; 298 | 5,605 | 285,409 |
| Sagaing Region | 43 - Kalaywa | 18,493 | 15,722 | | 429 | | | 1,028 | | | | | | | | | | | | | | | | | | | | | | | | | | | | | | | | | | | | | | | | | | | | | | | | | | | | | | | | | | | | | | | | | | | | | | | | 944 | 44,058 |
| Sagaing Region | 44 - Minkin | 40,925 | 28,423 | | 146 | | | 523 | | | | | | | | | | | | | | | | | | | | | | | | | | | | | | | | | | | | | | | | | | | | | | | | | | | | | | | | | | | | | | | | | | | | | | | | 1,570 | 88,120 |
| Sagaing Region | 45 - Katha | 59,462 | 23,246 | | 812 | | | 1,766 | | | | | | | 1,052 | | | | | | | | | | | | | | | | | | | | | | | | | | | | | | | | | | | | | | | | | | | | | | | | | | | | | | | | | | | | | | | | | 2,662 | 73,467 |
| Sagaing Region | 46 - Hteechin | 53,559 | 17,826 | | 507 | | | | | | | | | | | | | | | 588 | | | | | | | | | | | | | | | | | | | | | | | | | | | | | | | | | | | | | | | | | | | | | | | | | | | | | | | | | | | 316 | 2,160 | 95,768 |
| Sagaing Region | 47 - Bhanmauk | 28,960 | 16,690 | | 843 | | | | | | | | | | | 7,552 | | | | | | | | | | | | | | | | | | | | | | | | | | | | | | | | | | | | | | | | | | | | | | | | | | | | | | | | | | | | | | | 1,081; 833 | 3,868 | 71,664 |
| Sagaing Region | 48 - Intaw | 48,618 | 17,402 | | 902 | | | 2,409 | | | | | | | | | | | | | | | | | | | | | | | | | | | | | | | | | | | | | | | | | | | | | | | | | | | | | | | | | | | | | | | | | | | | | | | | 2,112 | 92,473 |
| Sagaing Region | 49 - Kawlin | 78,694 | 13,723 | | 907 | | | | | | | | | | | | | | | | | | | | | | | | | | | | | | | | | | | | | | | | | | | | | | | | | | | | | | | | | | | | | | | | | | | | | | | | | | | 2,214 | 114,817 |
| Sagaing Region | 50 - Wontho | 29,016 | 14,285 | | 322 | | | | | | | | | | | | | | | | | | | | | | | | | | | | | | | | | | | | | | | | | | | | | | | | | | | | | | | | | | | | | | | | | | | | | | | | | | | 1,036 | 55,821 |
| Sagaing Region | 51 - Pinyabu | 44,490 | 18,776 | | 1,848 | | | | | | | | | | | | | | | 1,529 | | | | | | | | | | | | | | | | | | | | | | | | | | | | | | | | | | | | | | | | | | | | | | | | | | | | | | | | | | | | 2,234 | 84,266 |
| Sagaing Region | 52 - Kanbalu | 119,364 | 51,772 | | 3,069 | | | | | | | | | | 566 | | | | | | | | | | | | | | | | | | | | | | | | | | | | | | | | | | | | | | | | | | | | | | | | | | | | | | | | | | | | | | | | 1,581 | 5,875 | 238,039 |
| Sagaing Region | 53 - Kyunhla | 44,320 | 10,797 | | 498 | | | 639 | | | | | | | | | | | | 807 | | | | | | | | | | | | | | | | | | | | | | | | | | | | | | | | | | | | | | | | | | | | | | | | | | | | | | | | | | | 1,556 | 2,238 | 77,164 |
| Sagaing Region | 54 - Leshi | 4,167 | 2,948 | | 75 | | | | | | | | | | | | | | | | | | | | | | | | 1,638 | | | | | | | | | | | | | | | | | | | | | | | | | | | | | | | | | | | | | | | | | | | | | | | | | | | 334 | 10,919 |
| Sagaing Region | 55 - Lahe | 10,286 | 10,849 | | 503 | | | | | | | | | | | | | | | | | | | | | | | | 6,325 | | | | | | | | | | | | | | | | | | | | | | | | | | | | | | | | | | | | | | | | | | | | | | | | | | | 703 | 33,713 |
| Sagaing Region | 56 - Nanyun | 9,811 | 8,021 | | 1,042 | | | | | | | | | | | | | | | | | | | | | | | | 5,087 | | | | | | | | | | | | | | | | | | | | | | | | | | | | | | | | | | | | | | | | | | | | | | | | | | | 1,418 | 31,744 |
| Sagaing Region | 57 - Khanti | 11,026 | 3,956 | | 248 | | | | | | | | | | | | | | 910 | 120 | | | | | | | | | 5,096 | | | | | | | | | | | | | | | | | | | | | | | | | | | | | | | | | | | | | | | | | | | | | | | | | | | 1,287 | 31,384 |
| Sagaing Region | 58 - Homalin | 54,398 | 12,063 | | 574 | | | 5,044 | | | | | | | | 8,510 | | | 30,896 | | | | | | | | | | | | | | | | | | | | | | | | | | | | | | | | | | | | | | | | | | | | | | | | | | | | | | | | | | | | | 5,301 | 167,703 |
| Sagaing Region | 59 - Sagaing | 163,580 | 31,675 | | 464 | | | 946 | | | | | | | 1,369 | | | | | | | | | | | | | | | | | | | | | | | | | | | | | | | | | | | | | | | | | | | | | | | | | | | | | | | | | | | | | | | | | 2,646 | 247,998 |
| Sagaing Region | 60 - Myinmu | 61,285 | 15,424 | | 312 | | | 828 | | | | | | | | | | | | | | | | | | | | | | | | | | | | | | | | | | | | | | | | | | | | | | | | | | | | | | | | | | | | | | | | | | | | | | | | 1,017 | 95,805 |
| Sagaing Region | 61 - Myoung | 62,879 | 10,186 | | 642 | | | | | | | | | | | | | | | | | | | | | | | | | | | | | | | | | | | | | | | | | | | | | | | | | | | | | | | | | | | | | | | | | | | | | | | | | | 439 | 742 | 89,841 |
| Sagaing Region | 62 - Tamu | 34,952 | 20,887 | | 287 | | | 479 | | | | | | | | | 2,688 | | | | | | | | | | | | | | | | | | | | | | | | | | | | | | | | | | | | | | | | | | | | | | | | | | | | | | | | | | | | | | | 1,744 | 84,384 |
| Sagaing Region | 63 - Chaung-U | 60,049 | 11,706 | | 1,145 | | | 384 | | | | | | | | | | | | | | | | | | | | | | | | | | | | | | | | | | | 171 | | | | | | | | | | | | | | | | | | | | | | | | | | | | | | | | | | | | 598 | 1,215 | 89,225 |
| Sagaing Region | 64 - Butalin | 71,770 | 11,505 | | 357 | | | 643 | | | | | | | | | | | | | | | | | | | | | | | | | | | | | | | | | | | | | | | | | | | | | | | | | | | | | | | | | | | | | | | | | | | | | | | | 1,572 | 118,336 |
| Sagaing Region | 65 - Monywa | 215,942 | 20,032 | | 986 | | | | | | | | | | 766 | | | | | | | | | | | | | | | | | | | | | | | | | | | | | | | | | | | | | | | | | | | | | | | | | | | | | | | | | | | | | | | | | 2,810 | 293,176 |
| Sagaing Region | 66 - Aryataw | 96,951 | 15,606 | | 1,616 | | | | | | | | | | | | | | | | | | | | | | | | | | | | | | | | | | | | | | | | | | | | | | | | | | | | | | | | | | | | | | | | | | | | | | | | | | | 2,378 | 142,366 |
| Sagaing Region | 67 - Phong Pyin | 34,621 | 24,794 | | 743 | | | 2,041 | | | | | | | | | | | 656 | | | | | | | | | | | | | | | | | | | | | | | | | | | | | | | | | | | | | | | | | | | | | | | | | | | | | | | | | | | | | 1,761 | 86,107 |
| Sagaing Region | 68 - Mawlay | 16,681 | 12,579 | | 224 | | | 756 | | | | | | | | | | | | | | | | | | | | | | | | | | | | | | | | | | | | | | | | | | | | | | | | | | | | | | | | | | | | | | | | | | | | | | | | 922 | 40,348 |
| Sagaing Region | 69 - Kani | 73,089 | 12,776 | | 593 | | | | | | | | | | | | | | | | | | | | | | | | | | | | | | | | | | | | | | | | | | | | | | | | | | | | | | | | | | | | | | | | | | | | | | | | | | | 2,045 | 117,221 |
| Sagaing Region | 70 - Salingyi | 74,681 | 11,838 | | 1,039 | | | | | | | | | | | | | | | 529 | | | | | | | | | | | | | | | | | | | | | | | | | | | | | | | | | | | | | | | | | | | | | | | | | | | | | | | | | | | | 1,598 | 109,219 |
| Sagaing Region | 71 - Pale | 73,336 | 24,759 | | 543 | | | | | | | | | | 564 | | | | | | | | | | | | | | | | | | | | | | | | | | | | | | | | | | | | | | | | | | | | | | | | | | | | | | | | | | | | | | | | | 2,596 | 126,740 |
| Sagaing Region | 72 - Yinmabin | 80,095 | 11,853 | | 540 | | | 1,424 | | | | | | | | | | | | | | | | | | | | | | | | | | | | | | | | | | | | | | | | | | | | | | | | | | | | | | | | | | | | | | | | | | | | | | | | 1,842 | 123,606 |
| Sagaing Region | 73 - Khin Oo | 76,865 | 20,166 | | 346 | | | 492 | | | | | | | | | | | | 536 | | | | | | | | | | | | | | | | | | | | | | | | | | | | | | | | | | | | | | | | | | | | | | | | | | | | | | | | | | | | 2,261 | 123,148 |
| Sagaing Region | 74 - Depayin | 82,457 | 11,699 | | 849 | | | | | | | | | | 1,647 | | | | | | | | | | | | | | | | | | | | | | | | | | | | | | | | | | | | | | | | | | | | | | | | | | | | | | | | | | | | | | | | | 1,304 | 122,975 |
| Sagaing Region | 75 - Shwebo | 149,811 | 28,078 | | 1,111 | | | | | | | | | | 733 | | | | | | | | | | | | | | | | | | | | | | | | | | | | | | | | | | | | | | | | | | | | | | | | | | | | | | | | | | | | | | | | | 2,593 | 224,563 |
| Sagaing Region | 76 - Wetlet | 121,603 | 20,056 | | 685 | | | | | | | | | | | | | | | | | | | | | | | | | | | | | | | | | | | | | | | | | | | | | | | | | | | | | | | | | | | | | | | | | | | | | | | | | | | 2,591 | 173,574 |
| Sagaing Region | 77 - Tan Si | 91,103 | 18,580 | | 2,136 | | | | | | | | | | | | | | | | | | | | | | | | | | | | | | | | | | | | | | | | | | | | | | | | | | | | | | | | | | | | | | | | | | | | | | | | | | | 1,717 | 146,498 |
| Sagaing Region | 78 - Ye-U | 65,339 | 15,774 | | 397 | | | 889 | | | | | | | | | | | | | | | | | | | | | | | | | | | | | | | | | | | | | | | | | | | | | | | | | | | | | | | | | | | | | | | | | | | | | | | | 1,525 | 104,684 |
| Tanintharyi Region | 79 - Kawthaung | 46,093 | 12,322 | | 880 | 2,240 | | | | | | | | | | | | | | | | | | | | | | | | | | | | | | | | | | | | | | | | | | | 580 | | | | | | | | | | | | | | | | | | | | | | | | | | | | | | | 2,675 | 112,589 |
| Tanintharyi Region | 80 - Bokepyin | 27,993 | 11,151 | | 1,035 | | | | | | | | | | | | | | | | | | | | | | | | | | | | | | | | | | | | | | | | | | | | | | | | | | | | | | | | | | | | | | | | | | | | | | | | | | | 2,714 | 59,099 |
| Tanintharyi Region | 81 - Dawei | 67,514 | 15,404 | | 1,402 | | | | | | | | | | | | | | | | | | | | | | | | | | | | | | | | | | | | | | | | | | | | | | | | | | | | | | | | | | | | | | | | | | | | | | | | | | | 2,110 | 134,723 |
| Tanintharyi Region | 82 - Yephyu | 49,875 | 12,253 | | 1,124 | | | 1,063 | | | | | | | | | | | | | | 1,890 | | | | | | | | | | | | | | | | | | | | | | | | | | | | | | | | | | | | | | | | | | | | | | | | | | | | | | | | | | 5,185 | 114,174 |
| Tanintharyi Region | 83 - Longlone | 65,136 | 8,828 | | 806 | | | | | | | | | | | | | | | | | | | | | | | | | | | | | | | | | | | | | | | | | | | | | | | | | | | | | | | | | | | | | | | | | | | | | | | | | | | 2,046 | 127,574 |
| Tanintharyi Region | 84 - Thayetchaung | 49,525 | 11,699 | | 1,259 | | | | | | 1,168 | | | | 315 | | | | | | | | | | | | | | | | | | | | | | | | | | | | | | | | | | | | | | | | | | | | | | | | | | | | | | | | | | | | | | | | | 2,230 | 106,436 |
| Tanintharyi Region | 85 - Kyunsu | 62,328 | 20,416 | | 1,469 | | | | | | | | | | | | | | | | | | | | | | | | | | | 707 | | | | | | | | | | | | | | | | | | | | | | | | | | | | | | | | | | | | | | | | | | | | | | | | 3,277 | 114,161 |
| Tanintharyi Region | 86 - Tanintharyi | 46,492 | 8,036 | | 1,388 | | | 1,161 | | | | | | | 467 | | | | | | | | | | | | | | | | | | | | | | | | | | | | | | | | | | | | | | | | | | | | | | | | | | | | | | | | | | | | | | | | | 3,083 | 82,313 |
| Tanintharyi Region | 87 - Pulau | 56,718 | 13,751 | | 1,094 | | | | | | 1,786 | | | | 422 | | | | | | | | | | | | | | | | | | | | | | | | | | | | | | | | | | | | | | | | | | | | | | | | | | | | | | | | | | | | | | | | | 3,540 | 114,023 |
| Tanintharyi Region | 88 - Myeik | 120,400 | 20,113 | | 4,927 | 4,307 | | 1,356 | | | | | | | 1,313 | | | | | 1,369 | | | | | | | | | | | | | | | | | | | | | | | | | | | | | | | | | | | | | | | | | | | | | | | | | | | | | | | | | | | | 4,290 | 226,798 |
| Bago Region | 89 - Kyaukgyi | 32,709 | 14,745 | | 3,261 | | | 2,425 | | | 4,818 | | | | | | | | | | | | | | | | | | | | | | | | | | | | | | | | | | | | | | | | | | | | | | | | | | | | | | | | | | | | | | | | | | | | | 2,085 | 87,881 |
| Bago Region | 90 - Taungoo | 104,225 | 35,233 | | 1,736 | | | | | | | | | | | | | | | | | | | | | | | | | | | | | | | | | | | | | | | | | | | | | | | | | | | | | | | | | | | | | | | | | | | | | | | | | | | 3,255 | 199,902 |
| Bago Region | 91 - Htantabin | 43,322 | 19,217 | | 911 | | | | | | | | | | | | | | | | | | | | | | | | | | | | | | | | | | | | | | | | | | | | | | | | | | | | | | | | | | | | | | | | | | | | | | | | | | | 2,206 | 96,592 |
| Bago Region | 92 - Phyu | 90,967 | 24,032 | | 19,005 | | | | | | | | | | | | | | | | | | | 460 | | | | | | | | | | | | | | | | | | | | | | 567 | | | | | | | | | | | | | | | | | | | | | | | | | | | | | | | | | 903 | 4,343 | 210,688 |
| Bago Region | 93 - Yetarsha | 74,996 | 36,718 | | 1,247 | | | 2,888 | | | | | | | | | | | | | | | | | | | | | | | | | | | | | | | | | | | | | | | | | | | | | | | | | | | | | | | | | | | | | | | | | | | | | | | | 4,236 | 167,020 |
| Bago Region | 94 - Oktwin | 65,568 | 23,051 | | 1,388 | | | | | | | | | | | | | | | | | | | | | | | | | | | | | | | | | | | | | | | | | | | | | | | | | | | | | | | | | | | | | | | | | | | | | | | | | | | 1,158 | 132,368 |
| Bago Region | 95 - Kawa | 84,149 | 20,214 | | 3,177 | | | | | | | | | | | | | | | | | | | | | | | | | | | | | | | | | | | | | | | | | | | | | | | | | | | | | | | | | | | | | | | | | | | | | | | | | | | 3,916 | 158,659 |
| Bago Region | 96 - Kyauktada | 92,792 | 19,897 | | 7,730 | | | 2,699 | | | | | | | | | | | | | | | | | | | | | | | | | | | | | | | | | | | | | | 893 | | | | | | | | | | | | | | | | | | | | | | | | | | | | | | | | | | 5,288 | 202,408 |
| Bago Region | 97 - Nyaung Lay Bin | 79,004 | 19,482 | | 1,598 | | | 1,879 | | | | | | | | | | | | | | | | 435 | | | | | | | | | | | | | | | | | | | | | | | | | | | | | | | | | | | | | | | | | | | | | | | | | | | | | | | | 2,580 | 164,375 |
| Bago Region | 98 - Daik-U | 86,269 | 15,538 | | 1,308 | | | | | | | | | | | | | | | | | | | | | | | | | | | | | | | | | | | | | | | | | | | | | | | | | | | | | | | | | | | | | | | | | | | | | | | | | | | 2,569 | 161,811 |
| Bago Region | 99 - Bago | 224,251 | 52,012 | | 2,178 | | | | | | | | | | | | | | | | | | | 592 | | | | | | | | | | | | | | | | | | | 653 | | | | | | 719 | | | | 2,302 | | | | | | | | | | | | | | | | 496 | | | | | | | | | | 242 | 4,425 | 412,631 |
| Bago Region | 100 - Shwekyin | 33,282 | 15,935 | | 821 | | | 1,865 | | | 796 | | | | | | | | | | | | | | | | | | | | | | | | | | | | | | | | | | | | | | | | | | | | | | | | | | | | | | | | | | | | | | | | | | | | | 1,879 | 77,137 |
| Bago Region | 101 - Wau | 66,735 | 21,556 | | 2,183 | | | | | | | | | | | | | | | | | | | | | | | | | | | | | | | | | | | | | | | | | | | | | | | | | | | | | | | | | | | | | | | | | | | | | | | | | | | 2,534 | 151,050 |
| Bago Region | 102 - Thanapin | 60,103 | 10,327 | | 3,230 | | | | | | | | | | | | | | | | | | | | | | | | | | | | | | | | | | | | | | | | | | | | 981 | | | | | | | | | | | | | | | | | | | | | | | | | | | | | | | 2,501 | 123,572 |
| Bago Region | 103 - Paukkaung | 48,654 | 30,553 | | 566 | | | | | | | | | | | | | | | 297 | | | | | | | | | | | | | | | | | | | | | | | | | | | | | | | | | | | | | | | | | | | | | | | | | | | | | | | | | | | | 1,097 | 99,623 |
| Bago Region | 104 - Paungsin | 66,958 | 17,038 | | 867 | | | 1,102 | | | | | | | | | | | | | | | | | | | | | | | | | | | | | | | | | | | | | | | | | | | | | | | | | | | | | | | | | | | | | | | | | | | | | | | | 1,768 | 111,759 |
| Bago Region | 105 - Padaung | 58,433 | 28,545 | | 683 | | | 913 | | | | | | | | | | | | | | | | | | | | | | | | | | | | | | | | | | | | | | | | | | | | | | | | | | | | | | | | | | | | | | | | | | | | | | | 4,080 | 2,284 | 115,696 |
| Bago Region | 106 - Pyay | 115,371 | 31,821 | | 784 | | | | | | | | | | 340 | | | | | | | | | | | | | | | | | | | | 1,158 | | | | | | | | | | | | | | | | | | | | | | | | | | | | | | | | | | | | | | | | | | | | 285 | 3,719 | 196,769 |
| Bago Region | 107 - Shwetaung | 65,954 | 14,992 | | 1,309 | | | | | | | | | | 964 | | | | | 368 | | | | | | | | | | | | | | | | | | | | | | | | | | | | | | | | | | | | | | | | | | | | | | | | | | | | | | | | | | | | 1,645 | 105,122 |
| Bago Region | 108 - Thaekone | 61,732 | 24,710 | | 866 | | | | | | | | | | 810 | | | | | | | | | | | | | | | | | | | | | | | | | | | | | | | | | | | | | | | | | | | | | | | | | | | | | | | | | | | | | | | | | 2,049 | 108,228 |
| Bago Region | 109 - Kyabingkauk | 52,171 | 16,815 | | 811 | | | 533 | | | | | | | | | | | | | | | | 174 | | | | | | | | 2,941 | | | | | | | | | | | | | | | | | | | | | | | | | | | | | | | | | | | | | | | | | | | | | | | | 1,763 | 96,901 |
| Bago Region | 110 - Zeegone | 21,929 | 21,814 | | 881 | | | | | | | | | | | | | | | | | | | | | | | | | | | | | | | | | | | | | | | | | | | | | | | | | | | | | | | | | | | | | | | | | | | | | | | | | | | 1,027 | 57,465 |
| Bago Region | 111 - Nattalin | 80,314 | 22,982 | | 823 | | | | | | | | | | | | | | | | | | | | | | | | | | | | | | | | | | | | | | | | | | | | | | | | | | | | | | | | | | | | | | | | | | | | | | | | | | 2,794 | 3,125 | 141,120 |
| Bago Region | 112 - Moenyo | 60,313 | 19,231 | | 665 | | | | | | | | | | | | | | | 415 | | | | | | | | | | | | | | | | | | | | | | | | | | | | | | | | | | | | | | | | | | | | | | | | | | | | | | | | | | | | 1,983 | 104,820 |
| Bago Region | 113 - Minhla | 54,520 | 17,122 | | 801 | | | | | | | | | | | | | | | | | | | | | | | | | | | | | | | | | | | | | | 868 | | | | | | | | | | | | | | | | | | | | | | | | | | | | | | | | | | | | | 2,280 | 99,631 |
| Bago Region | 114 - Letpandan | 74,758 | 17,988 | | 4,438 | | | 600 | | | | | | | | | | | | | | | | | | | | | | | | | | | | | | | | | | | | | | | | | | | | | | | | | | | | | | | | | | | | | | | | | | | | | | | | 2,629 | 138,462 |
| Bago Region | 115 - Thayarwady | 55,345 | 32,502 | | 1,833 | | | 898 | | | | | | | 208 | | | | | | | | | | | | | | | | | 448 | | | | | | | | | | | | | | | | | | | | | | | | | | | | | | | | | | | | | | | | | | | | | | | | 2,242 | 125,820 |
| Bago Region | 116 - Okpho | 56,159 | 18,066 | | 862 | | | 563 | | | | | | | | | | | | | | | | | | | | | | | | | | | | | | | | | | | | | | | | | | | | | | | | | | | | | | | | | | | | | | | | | | | | | | | | 2,331 | 104,127 |
| Magway Region | 117 - Gangga | 69,835 | 16,025 | | 1,545 | | | 1,273 | | | | | | | | | | | | | | | | 165 | | | | | | | | | | | | | | | | | | | | | | | | | | | | | | | | | | | | | | | | | | | | | | | | | | | | | | | 129; 122 | 2,148 | 109,315 |
| Magway Region | 118 - Saw | 37,264 | 8,178 | | 619 | | | 906 | | | | | | | | | 740 | | | | | | | | | | | | | | | | | | | | | | | | | | | | | | | | | | | | | | | | | | | | | | | | | | | | | | | | | | | | | | | 1,144 | 58,999 |
| Magway Region | 119 - Hteelin | 24,199 | 9,126 | | 1,574 | | | | | | | | | | | | | | | | | | | | | | | | | | | | | | | | | | | | | | | | | | | | | | | | | | | | | | | | | | | | | | | | | | | | | | | | | | | 633 | 39,426 |
| Magway Region | 120 - Saik Phyu | 50,079 | 14,076 | | 696 | | | 1,468 | | | | | | | | | | | | | | | | | | | | | | | | | | | | | | | | | | | | | | | | | | | | | | | | | | | | | | | | | | | | | | | | | | | | | | | | 1,917 | 86,595 |
| Magway Region | 121 - Pakokku | 161,737 | 24,875 | | 1,116 | | | 1,210 | | | | | | | 667 | | | | | | | | | 658 | | | | | | | | | | | | | | | | | | | | | | | | | | | | | | | | | | | | | | | | | | | | | | | | | | | | | | | | 3,342 | 246,482 |
| Magway Region | 122 - Pauk | 84,029 | 25,143 | | 939 | | | | | | | | | | | | | | | | | | | | | | | | | | | | | | | | | | | | | | | | | | | | | | | | | | | | | | | | | | | | | | | | | | | | | | | | | | | 4,193 | 148,311 |
| Magway Region | 123 - Myaing | 130,378 | 28,217 | | 648 | | | 1,217 | | | | | | | | | | | | | | | | | | | | | | | | | | | | | | | | | | | | | | | | | | | | | | | | | | | | | | | | | | | | | | | | | | | | | | | | 2,842 | 211,804 |
| Magway Region | 124 - Yesagyo | 106,131 | 25,923 | | 1,568 | | | 988 | | | | | | | 319 | | | | | | | | | 13,482 | | | | | | | | | | | | | | | | | | | | | | | | | | | | | | | | | | | | | | | | | | | | | | | | | | | | | | | | 3,292 | 193,236 |
| Magway Region | 125 - Chauk | 108,012 | 15,648 | | 1,381 | | | | | | | | | | | | | | | | | | | | | | | | | | | | | | | | | | | | | | | | | | | | | | | | | | | | | | | | | | | | | | | | | | | | | | | | | | | 2,440 | 164,145 |
| Magway Region | 126 - Taungdwingyi | 118,492 | 34,296 | | 1,502 | | | 3,067 | | | | | | | | | | | | | | | | 575 | | | | | | | | | | | | | | | | | | | | | | | | | | | | | | | | | | | | | | | | | | | | | | | | | | | | | | | | 3,985 | 219,112 |
| Magway Region | 127 - Natmauk | 120,907 | 13,476 | | 1,494 | | | 2,314 | | | | | | | | | | | | | | | | | | | | | | | | | | | | | | | | | | | | | | | | | | | | | | | | | | | | | | | | | | | | | | | | | | | | | | | | 3,405 | 191,685 |
| Magway Region | 128 - Magway | 150,918 | 31,224 | | 1,372 | | | 1,216 | | | | | | | 597 | | | | | | | | | | | | | | | | | | | | | | | | | | | | | | | | | | | | | | | | | | | | | | | | | | | | | | | | | | | | | | | | | 3,025 | 242,199 |
| Magway Region | 129 - Myothit | 80,454 | 15,796 | | 1,474 | | | 1,337 | | | | | | | | | | | | | | | | | | | | | | | | | | | | | | | | | | | | | | | | | | | | | | | | | | | | | | | | | | | | | | | | | | | | | | | | 2,633 | 136,696 |
| Magway Region | 130 - Yenangyaung | 66,952 | 19,421 | | 513 | | | | | | | | | | | | | | | | | | | | | | | | | | | | | | | | | | | | | | | | | | | | | | | | | | | | | | | | | | | | | | | | | | | | | | | | | | | 1,656 | 126,865 |
| Magway Region | 131 - Ngaphe | 22,794 | 6,585 | | 189 | | | 397 | | | | | | | | | 723 | | | | | | | | | | | | | | | | | | | | | | | | | | | | | | | | | | | | | | | | | | | 1,482 | | | | | | | | | | | | | | | | | | | | 1,226 | 39,626 |
| Magway Region | 132 - Salin | 114,282 | 36,882 | | 739 | | | | | | | | | | | | | | | | | | | | | | | | | | | | | | | | | | | | | | 1,436 | | | | | | | | | | | | | | | | | | | | | | | | | | | | | | | | | | | | 398 | 3,183 | 198,415 |
| Magway Region | 133 - Setutthaya | 17,220 | 6,227 | | 359 | | | | | | | | | | | | | | | | | | | | | | | | | | | | | | | | | | | | | | | | | | | | | | | | | | | | | | | | | | | | | | | | | | | | | | | | | | 3,870; 325 | 1,161 | 34,651 |
| Magway Region | 134 - Pwint Phyu | 82,240 | 26,428 | | 669 | | | | | | | | | | | | | | | | | | | | | | | | | | | | | | | | | | | | | | | | | | | | | | | | | | | | | | | | | | | | | | | | | | | | | | | | | | | 1,427 | 136,136 |
| Magway Region | 135 - Minbu | 85,852 | 22,841 | | 585 | | | 752 | | | | | | | | | | | | 503 | | | | 365 | | | | | | | | | | | | | | | | | | | | | | | | | | | | | | | | | | | | | | | | | | | | | | | | | | | | | | | | 2,727 | 143,792 |
| Magway Region | 136 - Kanma | 32,836 | 16,701 | | 338 | | | | | | | | | | | | | | | | | | | | | | | | | | | | | | | | | | | | | | | | | | | | | | | | | | | | | | | | | | | | | | | | | | | | | | | | | | | 879 | 60,485 |
| Magway Region | 137 - Sinpaungwe | 55,833 | 15,613 | | 531 | | | 902 | | | | | | | | | | | | | | | | | | | | | | | | | | | | | | | | | | | | | | | | | | | | | | | | | | | | | | | | | | | | | | | | | | | | | | | | 2,340 | 95,948 |
| Magway Region | 138 - Mindon | 26,605 | 10,590 | | 1,075 | | | 1,476 | | | | | | | | | | | | | | | | | | | | | | | | | | | | | | | | | | | | | | | | | | | | | | | | | | | | | | | | | | | | | | | | | | | | | | | | 1,221 | 50,095 |
| Magway Region | 139 - Minhla | 52,175 | 22,397 | | 1,064 | | | 1,399 | | | | | | | | | | | | | | | | | | | | | | | | | | | | | | | | | | | | | | | | | | | | | | | | | | | | | | | | | | | | | | | | | | | | | | | | 2,475 | 101,658 |
| Magway Region | 140 - Thayet | 46,326 | 18,006 | | 510 | | | | | | | | | | | | | | | 468 | | | | 253 | | | | | | | | | | | | | | | | | | | | | | | | | | | | | | | | | | | | | | | | | | | | | | | | | | | | | | | | 1,565 | 85,781 |
| Magway Region | 141 - Aung Lan | 108,475 | 30,128 | | 1,193 | | | | | | | | | | | | | | | | | | | | | | | | | | | | | | | | | | | | | | | | | | | | | | | | | | | | | | | | | | | | | | | | | | | | | | | | | | | 3,962 | 188,675 |
| Mandalay Region/Naypyidaw | 142 - Kyaukse | 116,368 | 47,368 | | 1,058 | | | 814 | | | | | | | 784 | | | | | | | | | | | | | | | | | | | | | | | | | | | | | | | | | | | | | | | | | | | | | | | | | | | | | | | | | | | | | | | | | 3,372 | 198,074 |
| Mandalay Region/Naypyidaw | 143 - Sinkai | 77,445 | 22,195 | | 685 | | | | | | | | | | | | | | | | | 824 | | 226 | | | | | | | | | | | | | | | | | | | | | | | | | | | | | | | | | | | | | | | | | | | | | | | | | | | | | | | | 2,192 | 118,479 |
| Mandalay Region/Naypyidaw | 144 - Tada-U | 73,409 | 20,976 | | 612 | | | 917 | | | | | | | | | | | | | | | | | | | | | | | | | | | | | | | 904 | | | | | | | | | | | | | | | | | | | | | | | | | | | | | | | | | | | | | | | | | 2,388 | 115,232 |
| Mandalay Region/Naypyidaw | 145 - Myitthar | 100,288 | 30,357 | | 962 | | | 997 | | | | | | | | | | | | | | | | | | | | | | | | | | | | | | | | | | | | | | | | | | | | | | | | | | | | | | | | | | | | | | | | | | | | | | | | 2,732 | 158,493 |
| Mandalay Region/Naypyidaw | 146 - Kyaukpadaung | 138,478 | 32,772 | | 1,529 | | | | | | | | | | | | | | | | | | | | | | | | | | | | | | | | | | | | | | | | | | | | | | | | | | | | | | | | | | | | | | | | | | | | | | | | | | | 3,320 | 237,303 |
| Mandalay Region/Naypyidaw | 147 - Nyaung U | 135,912 | 22,100 | | 600 | | | | | | | | | | | | | | | 661 | | | | | | | | | | | | | | | | | | | | | | | | | | | | 388 | | | | | | | | | | | | | | | | | | | | | | | | | | | | | | | | 3,251 | 206,048 |
| Mandalay Region/Naypyidaw | 148 - Singu | 75,134 | 13,864 | | 667 | | | 1,151 | | | | | | | | | | | | | | | | | | | | | | | | | | | | | | | | | | | | | | | | | | | | | | | | | | | | | | | | | | | | | | | | | | | | | | | 1,648 | 2,222 | 117,022 |
| Mandalay Region/Naypyidaw | 149 - Pyin Oo Lwin | 92,332 | 42,268 | | 1,319 | | | 1,268 | | | | | | | 1,044 | | | | | 1,129 | | | | | | | | | | | | | | | | | | | | | | | | | | | | | | | | | | | | | | | | | 236 | | | | | | | | | | | | | | | | | | | 3,736 | 197,006 |
| Mandalay Region/Naypyidaw | 150 - Mogok | 73,352 | 6,627 | | 604 | | | | | | | | 2,007 | | | | | | | | | | | | | 7,252 | | | | | | | | | | | | | | | | | | | | | | | | | | | | | | | | | | | | | | | | | | | | | | | | | | | | | | 3,376 | 147,121 |
| Mandalay Region/Naypyidaw | 151 - Mattara | 129,435 | 25,508 | | 1,109 | | | 2,081 | | | | | | | | | | | | | | | | | | | | | | | | 1,124 | | | | | | | | | | | | | | | | | | | | | | | | | | | | | | | | | | | | | | | | | | | | | | | | 3,973 | 203,738 |
| Mandalay Region/Naypyidaw | 152 - Thabeikkyin | 65,077 | 15,741 | | 679 | | | | | | | | | | | | | | | | | | | | | | | | | | | | | | | | | | | | | | | | | | | | | | | | | | | | | | | | | | | | | | | | | | | | | | | | | | 1,126 | 2,747 | 113,669 |
| Mandalay Region/Naypyidaw | 153 - Chanmyathasi | 134,414 | 12,548 | | 634 | | | 710 | | | | | | | 794 | | | | | | | | | 135 | | | | | | | | | | | | | | | | | | | | | | | | | | | | | | | | | | | | | | | | | | | | | | | | | | | | | | | | 1,455 | 209,208 |
| Mandalay Region/Naypyidaw | 154 - Chanayethazan | 90,585 | 6,773 | | 411 | | | | | | | | | | 541 | | | | | 356 | | | | | | | | | | | | 260 | | | | | | | | | | | | | | | | | | | | | | | | | | | | | | | 1,169 | | | | | | | | | | | | | | | | | 708 | 130,429 |
| Mandalay Region/Naypyidaw | 155 - Pyigyidagun | 120,474 | 11,266 | | 264 | | | | | | | | | | 484 | | | | | 503 | | | | 76 | | | | | | | | | | | | | | | | | | | | | | | | | | | | | | | | | | | | | | | | | | | | | | | | | | | | | | | | 1,873 | 204,403 |
| Mandalay Region/Naypyidaw | 156 - Maha Aungmye | 118,498 | 9,727 | | 1,078 | | | | | | | | | | | | | | | | | | | | | | | | | | | | | | | | | | | | | | | | | | | | | | | | | | | | | | | | | | | | | | | | | | | | | | | | | | | 949 | 172,741 |
| Mandalay Region/Naypyidaw | 157 - Aungmyethazan | 118,320 | 18,902 | | 386 | | | 552 | | | | | | | 711 | | | | | | | | | 143 | | | | | | | | 308 | | | | | | | | | | | | | | | | | | | | | | | | | 757 | | | | | | | | | | | | | | | | | | | | | | 281 | 1,659 | 186,323 |
| Mandalay Region/Naypyidaw | 158 - Patheingyi | 118,761 | 23,724 | | 353 | | | 1,020 | | | | | | | | | | | | 458 | | | | 272 | | | | | | | | | | | | | | | | | | | | | | | | | | | | | | | | | 1,075 | | | | | | | | | | | | | | | | | | | | | | 196 | 3,007 | 190,602 |
| Mandalay Region/Naypyidaw | 159 - Amarapura | 126,198 | 23,363 | | 477 | | | | | | | | | | 769 | | | | | | | | | | | | | | | | | 796 | | | | | | | | | | | | | | | | | | | | | | | | | | | | | | | | | | | | | | | | | | | | | | | 725; 75 | 2,505 | 181,664 |
| Mandalay Region/Naypyidaw | 160 - Mahlaing | 65,511 | 30,062 | | 988 | | | | | | | | | | | | | | | | | | | | | | | | | | | | | | | | | | | | | | | | | | | | | | | | | | | | | | | | | | | | | | | | | | | | | | | | | | | 1,987 | 122,191 |
| Mandalay Region/Naypyidaw | 161 - Meiktila | 103,837 | 91,571 | | 1,205 | | | | | | | | | | | | | | | | | | | | | | | | | | | | | | | | | | | | | | | | | | | | | | | | | | | | | | | | | | | | | | | | | | | | | | | | | | | 5,046 | 259,030 |
| Mandalay Region/Naypyidaw | 162 - Wandwin | 114,563 | 42,098 | | 1,533 | | | 1,436 | | | | | | | 301 | | | | | | | | | | | | | | | | | | | | | | | | | | | | | | | | | | | | | | | | | | | | | | | | | | | | | | | | | | | | | | | | | 10,805 | 195,548 |
| Mandalay Region/Naypyidaw | 163 - Thasi | 70,491 | 52,597 | | 1,016 | | | 880 | | | | | | | | | | | | | | | | 334 | | | | | | | | | | | | | | | | | | | | | | | | | | | | | | | | | | | | | | | | | | | | | | | | | | | | | | | | 4,588 | 156,671 |
| Mandalay Region/Naypyidaw | 164 - Nganzun | 70,219 | 16,191 | | 1,042 | | | 853 | | | | | | | | | | | | | | | | | | | | | | | | | | | | | | | | | | | | | | | | | | | | | | | | | | | | | | | | | | | | | | | | | | | | | | | | 1,573 | 111,707 |
| Mandalay Region/Naypyidaw | 165 - Taungtha | 101,229 | 30,094 | | 942 | | | 1,443 | | | | | | | | | | | | | | | | | | | | | | | | | | | | | | | | | | | | | | | | | | | | | | | | | | | | | | | | | | | | | | | | | | | | | | | | 4,344 | 195,211 |
| Mandalay Region/Naypyidaw | 166 - Nawthoyi | 87,849 | 37,179 | | 1,627 | | | | | | | | | | | | | | | | | | | | | | | | | | | | | | | | | | | | | | | | | | | | | | | | | | | | | | | | | | | | | | | | | | | | | | | | | | | 2,636 | 163,070 |
| Mandalay Region/Naypyidaw | 167 - Myingyan | 158,532 | 21,128 | | 777 | | | | | | | | | | | | | | | | | | | | | | | | | | | | | | | | | | 838 | | | | | | | | | | | | | | | | | | | | | | | | | | | | | | | | | | | | | | | | | 4,105 | 235,359 |
| Mandalay Region/Naypyidaw | 168 - Pyawbwe | 98,755 | 74,278 | | 762 | | | | | | | | | | | | | | | | | | | 664 | | | | | | | | | | | | | | | | | | | | | | | | | | | | | | | | | | | | | | | | | | | | | | | | | | | | | | | | 4,422 | 216,691 |
| Mandalay Region/Naypyidaw | 169 - Yamethin | 78,374 | 71,791 | | 1,715 | | | 2,443 | | | | | | | | | | | | | | | | | | | | | | | | | | | | | | | | | | | | | | | | | | | | | | | | | | | | | | | | | | | | | | | | | | | | | | | | 4,482 | 198,438 |
| Mandalay Region/Naypyidaw | 170 - Zambuthiri | 46,640 | 18,224 | | 986 | | | | | | | | | | | | | | | 233 | | | | 121 | | | | | | | | | | | | | | | | | | | | | | | | | | | | | | | | | | | | | 126 | | | | | | | | | | | | | | | | | | 2,392; 329; 202 | 1,121 | 95,047 |
| Mandalay Region/Naypyidaw | 171 - Dekhinathiri | 14,541 | 8,592 | | 174 | | | 159 | | | | | | | 140 | | | | | | | | | | | | | | | | | | | | | | | | | | | | | | | | | | | | | | | | | | | | | | 54 | | | | | | | | | | | | | | | | | | | 877 | 31,657 |
| Mandalay Region/Naypyidaw | 172 - Pyinmana | 75,541 | 24,929 | | 1,326 | | | | | | | | | | 616 | | | | | | | | | | | | | | | | | | | | | | | | | | | | | | | 160 | | | | | | | | | | | | | | | | | | | | | | 400 | | | | | 252 | | | | | | | 2,405 | 138,356 |
| Mandalay Region/Naypyidaw | 173 - Lewe | 104,422 | 40,491 | | 1,547 | | | 2,124 | | | | | | | | | | | | 642 | | 4,183 | | | | | | | | | | | | | | | | | | | | | | | | | | | | | | | | | | | | | | | 570 | | | | | | | | | | | | | | | | | | | 6,215 | 221,388 |
| Mandalay Region/Naypyidaw | 174 - Zeyathiri | 30,965 | 36,325 | | 2,690 | | | | | | | | | | | | | | | | | | | | | | | | | | | | | | | | | | | | | | | | | 178 | | | | | | | | | | | | | | | | | | | | | | | | | | | | | | | | | | 1,905 | 82,214 |
| Mandalay Region/Naypyidaw | 175 - Tatkon | 80,292 | 43,819 | | 1,030 | | | 1,763 | | | | | | | | | | | | 496 | | | | | | | | | | | | | | | | | | | | | | | | | | 307 | | | | | | | | | | | | | | | | | | | | | | | | | | | | | | | | | 533; 525 | 4,348 | 180,838 |
| Mandalay Region/Naypyidaw | 176 - Pubbathiri | 43,101 | 32,942 | | 522 | | | | | | | | | | 483 | | | | | | | | | | | | | | | | | | | | | | | | | | | | | | | 112 | | | | | | | | | | | | | | | | | | | | | | | | | | | | | | | | | 103; 61; 37 | 1,463 | 98,077 |
| Mandalay Region/Naypyidaw | 177 - Uttarathiri | 27,511 | 15,693 | | 798 | | | 318 | | | | | | | 619 | | | | | | | | | | | | | | | | | | | | | | | | | | | | | | | 61 | | | | | | | | | | | | | | | | | | | | | | | | | | | | | | | | | | 1,320 | 58,649 |
| Mon State | 178 - Kyaikmarao | 38,329 | 17,205 | | 1,089 | 26,888 | | | | | | | | | | | | | | 1,496 | | | | | | | | | | | | | | | | | | | | | | | | | | | | | | | | | | | | | | | | | | | | | | | | | | | | | | | | | | | 509 | 7,509 | 183,685 |
| Mon State | 179 - Chaungsone | 37,893 | 15,316 | | 682 | 18,618 | | | | | | | | | | | | | | | | | | | | | | | | | | | | | | | | | | | | | | | | | | | | | | | | | | | | | | | | | | | | | | | | | | | | | | | | | | 2,076 | 132,552 |
| Mon State | 180 - Mudon | 43,955 | 12,578 | | 332 | 44,079 | | | | | | | | | | | | | | | | | | | | | | | | | | | | | | | | | | | | | | | | | | | | | | | | | | | | | | | | | | | | | | | | | | | | | | | | | | 2,790 | 182,302 |
| Mon State | 181 - Mawlamyine | 110,382 | 27,756 | | 1,150 | 13,085 | | | | | | | | | | | | | | | | | | | | | | | | | | | | | | | | | | | | | | | | | | 878 | | | | | | | | | | | | | | | | | | | | | | | | | | | | | | | | 2,612 | 248,145 |
| Mon State | 182 - Ye | 48,303 | 9,785 | | 955 | 62,808 | | | | | | | | | | | | | | | | | | | | | | | | | | | | | | | | | | | | | | | | | | | | | | | | | | | | | | | | | | | | | | | | | | | | | | | | | | 5,312 | 235,592 |
| Mon State | 183 - Thanbyuzayat | 35,330 | 10,314 | | 590 | 31,585 | | | | | | | | | | | | | | | | | | | | | | | | | | | | | | | | | | | | | | | | | | | | | | | | | | | | | | | | | | | | | | | | | | | | | | | | | | 3,197 | 151,381 |
| Mon State | 184 - Kyaikto | 57,104 | 20,731 | | 916 | 2,091 | | 1,575 | | | | | | | | | | | | | | | | | | | | | | 2,935 | | | | | | | | | | | | | | | | | | | | | | | | | | | | | | | | | | | | | | | | | | | | | | | | | | 4,478 | 138,366 |
| Mon State | 185 - Paung | 64,863 | 21,552 | | 958 | 27,729 | | 1,842 | | | | | | | | | | | | | | | | 553 | | | | | | | | | | | | | | | | | | | | | | | | | | | | | | | | | | | | | | | | | | | | | | | | | | | | | | | | 5,120 | 213,888 |
| Mon State | 186 - Bilin | 56,186 | 21,689 | | 4,329 | | | 2,059 | | | 3,504 | | | | 807 | | | | | | | | | 458 | | | | | | | | | | | 888 | | | | | | | | | | | | | | | | | | | | | | | | | | | | | | | | | | | | | | | | | | | | | 4,998 | 149,614 |
| Mon State | 187 - Thaton | 80,588 | 26,958 | | 989 | | | 1,773 | | | 6,861 | | | | | | | | | | | | | 635 | | | | | | | | | | | 668 | | | | | | | | | | | | | | | | | | | | | | | | | | | | | | 939 | | | | | | | | | | | | | | | 6,363 | 212,255 |
| Rakhine State | 188 - Kyaukphyu | 982 | 3,595 | | | | | | | 5,088 | | | | | | | | 6,885 | | | | | | | | | 1,248 | | | | | | | | | | | | | | | | | | | | | | | | | | | 715 | | | | | | | | | | | | | | | | | | | | | | | | | | 977 | 33,657 |
| Rakhine State | 189 - Manaung | 4,747 | 3,876 | | | | | | | 10,567 | | | | | | | | 7,849 | | | | | | | | | 7,318 | | | | | | | | | | | | | | | | | | | | | | | | | | | | | | | | | | | | | | | | | | | | | | | | | | | | 1,993; 1,414 | 1,852 | 55,635 |
| Rakhine State | 190 - Rambree | 2,756 | 15,204 | | | | | | | 17,629 | | | | | | | | 6,781 | | | | | | | | | 7,206 | | | | | | | | | | | | | | | | | | | | | | | | | | | | | | | | | | | | | | | | | | | | | | | | | | | | | 3,415 | 80,658 |
| Rakhine State | 191 - Ann | 5,049 | 6,527 | | | | | | | 1,905 | | | | | | | | 942 | | | | | | | | | 759 | | | | | | | | | | | | | | | | | | | | | | | | | | | | | | | | | | | | | | | | | | | | | | | | | | | | | 1,285 | 22,945 |
| Rakhine State | 192 - Sittwe | 2,975 | 9,084 | | | | | | | 26,797 | | | | | | | | 17,364 | | | | | | | | | | | | | | | | | | | | | | | | | | | | | | | | | | | | | | | | | | | | | | | | | | | | | | | | | | | | | | 2,899 | 107,232 |
| Rakhine State | 193 - Pauktaw | Election not held | | | | | | | | | | | | | | | | | | | | | | | | | | | | | | | | | | | | | | | | | | | | | | | | | | | | | | | | | | | | | | | | | | | | | | | | | | | | | | | |
| Rakhine State | 194 - Ponnagyun | Election not held | | | | | | | | | | | | | | | | | | | | | | | | | | | | | | | | | | | | | | | | | | | | | | | | | | | | | | | | | | | | | | | | | | | | | | | | | | | | | | | |
| Rakhine State | 195 - Rathedaung | Election not held | | | | | | | | | | | | | | | | | | | | | | | | | | | | | | | | | | | | | | | | | | | | | | | | | | | | | | | | | | | | | | | | | | | | | | | | | | | | | | | |
| Rakhine State | 196 - Buthidaung | Election not held | | | | | | | | | | | | | | | | | | | | | | | | | | | | | | | | | | | | | | | | | | | | | | | | | | | | | | | | | | | | | | | | | | | | | | | | | | | | | | | |
| Rakhine State | 197 - Maungdaw | Election not held | | | | | | | | | | | | | | | | | | | | | | | | | | | | | | | | | | | | | | | | | | | | | | | | | | | | | | | | | | | | | | | | | | | | | | | | | | | | | | | |
| Rakhine State | 198 - Kyauktaw | Election not held | | | | | | | | | | | | | | | | | | | | | | | | | | | | | | | | | | | | | | | | | | | | | | | | | | | | | | | | | | | | | | | | | | | | | | | | | | | | | | | |
| Rakhine State | 199 - Minbya | Election not held | | | | | | | | | | | | | | | | | | | | | | | | | | | | | | | | | | | | | | | | | | | | | | | | | | | | | | | | | | | | | | | | | | | | | | | | | | | | | | | |
| Rakhine State | 200 - Myebon | Election not held | | | | | | | | | | | | | | | | | | | | | | | | | | | | | | | | | | | | | | | | | | | | | | | | | | | | | | | | | | | | | | | | | | | | | | | | | | | | | | | |
| Rakhine State | 201 - Mrauk-U | Election not held | | | | | | | | | | | | | | | | | | | | | | | | | | | | | | | | | | | | | | | | | | | | | | | | | | | | | | | | | | | | | | | | | | | | | | | | | | | | | | | |
| Rakhine State | 202 - Gwa | 28,662 | 6,328 | | 301 | | | | | 5,451 | | | | | | | | | | | | | | | | | | | | | | | | | | | | | | | | | | | | | | | | | | | | | | | | | | | | | | | | | | | | | | | | | | | | | 3,159 | 1,509 | 54,952 |
| Rakhine State | 203 - Taungoo | 4,411 | 2,799 | | | | | | | 5,150 | | | | | | | | | | | | | | | | | 2,770 | | | | | | | | | | | | | | | | | | | | | | | | | | | | | | | | | | | | | | | | | | | | | | | | | | | | | 453 | 21,952 |
| Rakhine State | 204 - Thandwe | 30,191 | 15,738 | | | | | | | 22,405 | | | | | | | | | | | | | | | | | 4,247 | | | | | | | | | | | | | | | | | | | | | | | | | | | 1,526 | | | | | | | | | | | | | | | | | | 402 | | | | | | | 1,895 | 4,184 | 100,926 |
| Yangon Region | 205 - Taiggyi | 122,306 | 35,758 | | 1,879 | | | 3,340 | | | 662 | | | | 983 | | | | | | | | | | | | | | | | | | | | 1,307 | | | | | | | | | | | | | 1,197 | | | | | | | | | | | | | | | | | | | | | | | | | | | | | | | | 4,576 | 216,133 |
| Yangon Region | 206 - Htantabin | 71,169 | 26,760 | | 1,097 | | | | | | | | | | 437 | | | | | | | 1,775 | | | | | | | | | | | | | | | | | | | | | | | | | | | | | | | | | | | | | | | | | | | | | | | | | | | | | | | | | 238 | 3,752 | 140,760 |
| Yangon Region | 207 - Mingalardon | 118,589 | 43,349 | | 2,087 | | | | | | | | | | 1,906 | | | | | 399 | | | | | | | | | | | | | | | | | | | | | | | | | | | | 509 | | | | | | | | | | | | | | | | | | | | | | | | | | | | | | | | 2,745 | 288,522 |
| Yangon Region | 208 - Hmawbi | 97,300 | 46,040 | | 1,445 | | | | | | | | | | 884 | | | | | | | | | | | | | | | | | 1,462 | | | | | | | | | | | | | | | | | | | | | | | | | | | | | | | | | | | | | | 448 | | | | | | | | | | 3,643 | 199,474 |
| Yangon Region | 209 - Shwepyithar | 155,783 | 23,809 | | 2,725 | | | | | | | | | | 1,695 | | | | | | | 1,332 | | | | | | | | | | 946 | | | | | | | | | | | | | | 376 | | | | | | | | | | | | | | | | | | | | | | | | | | | | | | | | | | 4,577 | 313,783 |
| Yangon Region | 210 - Hlaing Tharyar (East) | 144,476 | 16,440 | | 541 | | | 1,583 | | | | | | | 1,116 | | | | | | | 1,906 | | | | | | | | 7,068 | | | | | | | | | | | | | | | | | | | | | 1,508 | | | | | | | | | | | | | | | | | | | | | | | 220 | | | | | 473 | 7,706 | 362,585 |
| Yangon Region | 211 - Hlaing Tharyar (West) | 121,279 | 16,300 | | 1,062 | | | 2,078 | | | | | | | 1,559 | | | | | | | | | | | | | | | | | | | | | | | | | 1,599 | | | | | | | | | | 2,523 | | | | | | | | | | | | | | | | | | | | | | | | | | | | | 674 | 5,444 | 278,219 |
| Yangon Region | 212 - Hlegu | 108,024 | 58,036 | | 1,839 | | | | | | | | | | | | | | | | | | | | | | | | | | | | | | | | | | | | | | | | | | | | | | | | | | | | | | | | | | | | | | | | | | | | | | | | | | | 3,851 | 224,541 |
| Yangon Region | 213 - Insein | 143,156 | 19,391 | | 764 | | | | | | | | | | 1,913 | | | | | 1,308 | | | | | | | | | | | | | | | | | | | | | | | | | | | | | | | | | | | | | | | | | | | | | | | | | | | | | | | | | | | | 3,144 | 237,230 |
| Yangon Region | 214 - Tamwe | 74,436 | 5,276 | | 1,041 | | | | | | | | | | | | | | | | | | | | | | | | | | | | | | | | | | | | | | | | | 387 | | | | | | | | | | | | | | | | | | | | | | | | | 263 | | | | | | | | | 1,012 | 127,107 |
| Yangon Region | 215 - South Okkalapa | 85,232 | 8,442 | | 306 | | | | | | | | | | 995 | | | | | 2,706 | | 1,093 | | | | | | | | | | | | | | | | | | | | | | | | | | | | | | | | | | | | | | | | | | | | | | | | | | | | | | | | | | 1,286 | 136,155 |
| Yangon Region | 216 - Dagon Myothit (Seikkan) | 77,083 | 11,606 | | 1,001 | | | | | | | | | | 962 | | | | | | | | | | | | | | | | | | | | | | | | | | | | | | | | | | | | | | | | | | | | | | | | | | | | | | | | | | | | | | | | | 2,330 | 162,634 |
| Yangon Region | 217 - Dagon Myothit (South) | 164,933 | 22,147 | | 1,176 | | | | | | | | | | 1,607 | | | | | | | | | | | | | | | | | 1,072 | | | | | | | | 5,278 | | | | | | 437 | | | | | | | | | | | | | | | | | | | | | | | | | | | | | | | | | | 4,425 | 299,768 |
| Yangon Region | 218 - Dagon Myothit (North) | 101,934 | 10,434 | | 783 | | | | | | | | | | 1,304 | | | | | 593 | | 1,411 | | | | | | | | | | | | | 159 | | | | | | | | | | | | | | | | | | | | | | | | | | | | | | | | | | | | | | | | | 182 | | | | 2,079 | 166,352 |
| Yangon Region | 219 - Dagon Myothit (East) | 74,727 | 13,139 | | 875 | | | 557 | | | | | | | 916 | | | | | | | | | | | | | | | | | | | | 310 | | | 7,990 | | | | | | | | | | | | | | | | | | | | | | | | | | | | | | | | | | | | | | | | | | 3,879 | 151,978 |
| Yangon Region | 220 - Dawbon | 38,163 | 5,515 | | 502 | | | 420 | | | | | | | | | | | | | | 524 | | | | | | | | | | | | | | | | | | | | | | | | | | | | | | | | | | | | | | | | | | | | | | | | | | | | | | | | | | 777 | 70,753 |
| Yangon Region | 221 - Pazundaung | 21,056 | 1,124 | | 395 | | | | | | | | | | | | | | | | | 271 | | | | | | | | | | | | | | | | | | | | | | | | 145 | | | | | | | | | | | | | | | | | | | | | | | | | | | | | | | | | | 217 | 35,871 |
| Yangon Region | 222 - Botahtaung | 17,085 | 5,331 | | 349 | | | | | | | | | | | | | | | | | | | | | | | | | | | | | | | | | | 445 | | | | | | | | | | | | | | | | | | | | | | | | | | | | | | | | | | | | | | | 89 | 111 | 190 | 33,288 |
| Yangon Region | 223 - Mingalar Taung Nyunt | 56,190 | 4,399 | | 448 | | | | | | | | | | 736 | | | | | | | | | | | | | | | | | | | | | | | | | | | | | | | | | | | | | | | | | | | | 1,484 | | | | | | | | | | | | | | | | | | | | | 1,221 | 104,037 |
| Yangon Region | 224 - North Okkalapa | 158,131 | 18,027 | | 1,181 | | | | | | | | | | 1,790 | | | | | | | 2,467 | | | | | | | | | | | | | 561 | | | | | | | | | | | | | | | | | | | | | | | | | | | | | | | | | | | | | | | | | | | | | 2,806 | 273,481 |
| Yangon Region | 225 - Yankin | 33,167 | 4,715 | | 356 | | | | | | | | | | 600 | | | | | | | | | | | | | | | | | | | | | | | | | | | | | | | | | | | | | | | | | | | | | | | | | | | | | | | | | | | | | | | | | 394 | 56,028 |
| Yangon Region | 226 - Thaketa | 108,688 | 11,897 | | 761 | | | 801 | | | | | | | 1,348 | | | | | 593 | | | | | | | | | | | | | | | | | | | | | | | | | | | | | | | | | | | | | | | | | | | | | | | 284 | | | | | | | | | | | | 737 | 1,677 | 174,751 |
| Yangon Region | 227 - Thingangyun | 112,604 | | | 1,449 | | | | | | | | | | 3,926 | | | | | | | | | | | | | | | | | | | | | | | | 2,389 | | | 5,781 | | | | | | | | | | | | | | | | | | | | | | | | | | | | | | | | | | | | | 390 | 2,246 | 184,485 |
| Yangon Region | 228 - Kokokyun | 189 | 1,176 | | 15 | | | | | | | | | | | | | | | | | | | | | | | | | | | | | | | | | | | | | | | | | | | | | | | | | | | | | | | | | | | | | | | | | | | | | | | | | | | 16 | 1,466 |
| Yangon Region | 229 - Kawhhu | 64,922 | 11,727 | | 478 | | | | | | | | | | | | | | | | | | | | | | | | | | | | | | 169 | | | | | | | | | | | | | | | | | | | | | | | | | | | | | | | | | 114 | | | | | | | | | | | 35 | 1,670 | 98,678 |
| Yangon Region | 230 - Kyauktan | 74,687 | 21,049 | | 849 | | | | | | | | | | 1,237 | | | | | 1,222 | | | | 459 | | | | | | | | | | | | | | | | | | | | | | | | | | | | | | | | | | | | | | | | | | | | | | | | | | | | | | | | 2,647 | 132,208 |
| Yangon Region | 231 - Kunchangon | 58,653 | 9,882 | | 1,445 | | | | | | | | | | | | | | | | | | | | | | | | | | | | | | | | | | | | | | | | | | | | | | | | | | | | | | | | | | | | | | | | | | | | | | | | | | | 1,654 | 89,932 |
| Yangon Region | 232 - Khayam | 78,875 | 18,200 | | 1,985 | | | | | | | | | | | | | | | | | | | | | | | | | | | | | | | | | | | | | | | | | | | | | | | | | | | | | | | | | | | | | | | | | | | | | | | | | | 677 | 2,891 | 128,116 |
| Yangon Region | 233 - Seikgyi/Khaungto | 13,568 | 6,369 | | 357 | | | | | | | | | | | | | | | | | | | | | | | | | | | | | | 85 | | | | | | | | | | | | | | | | | | | | | | | | | | | | | | | | | | | | | | | | | | | | | 689 | 26,055 |
| Yangon Region | 234 - Twantay | 104,769 | 26,674 | | 2,122 | | | 1,683 | | | | | | | 664 | | | | | | | 1,515 | | | | | | | | | | | | | 473 | | | | | | | | | | | | | | | | | | | | | | | | | | | | | | | 525 | | | | | | | | | | | | | | 3,118 | 174,441 |
| Yangon Region | 235 - Dala | 75,531 | 14,017 | | 1,080 | | | | | | | | | | | | | | | 872 | | | | | | | | | | | | | | | | | | | | | | | | | | | | | | | | | | | | | | | | | | | | | | 131 | | | | | | | | | | | | | | 2,603 | 130,599 |
| Yangon Region | 236 - Thanlyin | 111,296 | 36,799 | | 902 | | | 1,013 | | | | | | | 1,057 | | | | | | | | | | | | | | | 3,429 | | | | | | | | | | | | | | | | | | | 687 | | 992 | | | | | | | | | | | | | | | | | | | | | | | | | | | | | 5,317 | 222,275 |
| Yangon Region | 237 - Thonkhwa | 73,854 | 21,004 | | 1,192 | | | | | | | | | | | | | | | | | | | | | | | | | | | | | | | | | | | | | | | | | | | | | | | | | | | | | | | | | | | | | | | | | | | | | | | | | | | 2,588 | 126,063 |
| Yangon Region | 238 - Kyauktada | 13,242 | 1,138 | | 114 | | | | | | | | | | | | | | | 143 | | | | | | | | | | | | 48 | | | | | | | | 286 | | | | | | | | | | | | | | | | | | | | | | | | | | | | | | | | | | | | | | | | 265 | 23,984 |
| Yangon Region | 239 - Kamayut | 38,547 | 3,051 | | 212 | | | | | | | | | | 538 | | | | | 656 | | | | | | | | | | | | | | | | | | | | | | | | | | | | | | | | | | | | | | | | | | | | | | | | | | | | | | | | | | | | 409 | 70,999 |
| Yangon Region | 240 - Kyimyindaing | 53,515 | 5,377 | | 431 | | | | | | | | | | 566 | | | | | | | 816 | | | | | | | | | | | | | | | | | | | | | | | | | | | | | | | | | | | | | | | | | | | | | | | | | | | | | | | | | | 1,110 | 88,180 |
| Yangon Region | 241 - Sanchaung | 47,931 | 3,405 | | 362 | | | | | | | | | | 758 | | | | | | | | | | | | | | | | | 148 | | | | | | | | | | | | | | | | | | | | | | | | | | | | | | | | | | | | | | | | | | | | | | | | 358 | 81,775 |
| Yangon Region | 242 - Dagon | 9,714 | 4,276 | | 551 | | | | | | | | | | 335 | | | | | | | | | | | | | | | | | | | | | | | | | | | | | | | | | | | | | | | | | | | | | | | | | | | | | | | | | | | | | | | | | 185 | 21,004 |
| Yangon Region | 243 - Pabedan | 12,882 | 919 | | 107 | | | | | | | | | | | | | | | | | | | | | | | | | | | | | | | | | | 1,437 | | | | | | | | | | | | | | | | | | | | | | | | | | | | | | | | | | | | | | | | | 201 | 25,408 |
| Yangon Region | 244 - Bahan | 40,339 | 3,798 | | 326 | | | | | | | | | | 1,218 | | | | | | | | | | | | | | | | | | | | | | | | | | | | | | | | | | | | | | | | | | | | | | | | | | | | | | | | | | | | | | | | | 670 | 67,222 |
| Yangon Region | 245 - Mayangone | 91,096 | 10,139 | | 424 | | | | | | | | | | 7,712 | | | | | | | | | | | | | | | | | | | | | | | | | | | | | | | | | | | | | | | | | | | | | | | | | | | | | | | | 166 | | | | | | 114 | | | 1,577 | 158,898 |
| Yangon Region | 246 - Latha | 9,694 | 614 | | 70 | | | | | | | | | | 158 | | | | | | | 108 | | | | | | | | | | | | | | | | | | | | | | | | | | | | | | | | | | | | | | | | | | | | | | | | | | | | | | | | | 289 | 94 | 17,863 |
| Yangon Region | 247 - Lanmadaw | 18,689 | 1,041 | | 205 | | | | | | | | | | 333 | | | | | | | | | | | | | | | | | | | | | | | | | | | | | | | | | | | | | | | | | | | | | | | | | | | | | | | | | | | | | | | | | 238 | 34,044 |
| Yangon Region | 248 - Hlaing | 84,382 | 6,562 | | 418 | | | | | | | | | | 1,434 | | | | | 612 | | | | | | | | | | | | | | | | | | | | | | | | | | | | | | | | | | | | | | | | | | | | | | | | | | | | | | | | | | | | 725 | 141,442 |
| Yangon Region | 249 - Ahlone | 23,791 | 1,552 | | 120 | | | | | | | | | | | | | | | | | | | | | | | | | | | | | | | | | | | | | | | | | | | | | | | | | | | | | | | | | | | | | | | | | | | | | | | | | | 520 | 67 | 38,460 |
| Shan State | 250 - Kyaukme | 16,534 | 6,720 | 28,677 | | | | | | | | 7,341 | 8,211 | | | | | | | | | | | | | | | | | | | | | | | | | | | | | | | | | | | | | | | | | | | | | | | | | | | | | | | | | | | | | | | | | | 510 | 2,282 | 118,095 |
| Shan State | 251 - Thibaw | 11,594 | 6,225 | 59,069 | | | | | | | | 8,360 | | | | | | | | | | | | | | | | | | | | | | | | | | | | | | | | | | | | | | | | | | | | | | | | | | | | | | | | | | | | | | | | | | | | 4,111 | 136,021 |
| Shan State | 252 - Naungcho | 36,966 | 15,070 | 6,748 | 1,216 | | | 1,763 | | | | 2,482 | | | | | | | | | | | 11,362 | | | | | | | | | | | | | | | | | | | | | | | | | | | | | | | | | | | | | | | | | | | | 269 | | | | | | | | | | | | | 3,527 | 105,426 |
| Shan State | 253 - Namtu | 4,859 | 4,018 | 10,096 | | | | | | | | 544 | 2,728 | | | | | | | | | | | | | | | | | | | | 559 | | | | | | | | | | | | | | | | | | | | | | | | | | | | | | | | | | | | | | | | | | | | | | | 1,671 | 33,658 |
| Shan State | 254 - Namsan | 5,690 | 2,381 | | | | | | | | | | 16,091 | | | | | | | | | | | | | | | | | | | | | | | | | | | | | | | | | | | | | | | | | | | | | | | | | | | | | | | | | | | | | | | | | | | 1,192 | 40,388 |
| Shan State | 255 - Mantong | | 3,170 | | | | | | | | | | 9,448 | | | | | | | | | | | | | | | | | | | | | | | | | | | | | | | | | | | | | | | | | | | | | | | | | | | | | | | | | | | | | | | | | | | 1,439 | 24,393 |
| Shan State | 256 - Kengtung | 35,277 | 18,489 | 6,201 | 1,030 | | | | | | | | | | 607 | | | | | | | | | | | | | | | | | | | | | 1,321 | | | | | | | | | | | | | | | | | | | | | | | | | | | | | | | | | | | | | | | | | | | 662 | 6,861 | 128,612 |
| Shan State | 257 - Mong Khat | 2,858 | 3,061 | | | | | | | | | 455 | | | | | | | | | | | | | | | | | | | | | | | | | | | | | | | | | | | | | | | | | | | | | | | | | | | | | | | | | | | | | | | | | | | | 1,556 | 16,831 |
| Shan State | 258 - Mongyang | 1,713 | 2,775 | 218 | | | | | | | | 300 | | | | | | | | | | | | | | | | | | | | | | | | | | | | | | | | | | | | | | | | | | | | | | | | | | | | | | | | | | | | | | | | | | | | 453 | 6,587 |
| Shan State | 259 - Mong La | Election not held | | | | | | | | | | | | | | | | | | | | | | | | | | | | | | | | | | | | | | | | | | | | | | | | | | | | | | | | | | | | | | | | | | | | | | | | | | | | | | | |
| Shan State | 260 - Mong Pyin | 5,640 | 9,301 | 4,579 | | | | | | | | 986 | | | | | | | | | | | | | | | | | | | | | | | | 670 | | | | | 2,296 | | | | | | | | | | | | | | | | | | | | | | | | | | | | | | | | | | | | | | 409 | 3,563 | 45,476 |
| Shan State | 261 - Tachileik | 40,338 | 14,358 | 10,288 | 813 | | | | | | | 3,998 | | | 693 | | | | | | | | | | | | | | | | | | | | | | | | | | | | | | | | | | | | | | | | | | | | | | | | | | | | | | | | | | | | | | | | | 4,023 | 134,923 |
| Shan State | 262 - Mong Hpyak | 5,139 | 6,105 | 1,490 | | | | | | | | 1,903 | | | | | | | | | | | | | | | | | | | | | | | | | | | | | | | | | | | | | | | | | | | | | | | | | | | | | | | | | | | | | | | | | | | | 1,296 | 22,552 |
| Shan State | 263 - Mong Yaung | 9,724 | 6,265 | 1,902 | | | | 1,038 | | | | 1,523 | | | | | | | | | | | | | | | | | | | | | | | | | | | | | | | | | | | | | | | | | | | | | | | | | | | | | | | | | | | | | | | | | | | | 1,546 | 27,191 |
| Shan State | 264 - Taunggyi | 112,808 | 36,867 | 6,449 | 1,618 | | 68,021 | | | | | | | | 715 | | | | | 1,406 | | 1,779 | | 379 | 2,644 | | | | | | | | | | | | | | | | | | | | | | | | | | | | | | | | | | | | | | | | | | | | | | | | | | | | | | | 10,660 | 324,913 |
| Shan State | 265 - Nyaungshwe | 72,300 | 24,899 | | 871 | | | | | | | | | | | | | | | | | 2,070 | | | | | | | | | | | | | | | 8,023 | | | | | | | 3,280 | | | | | | | | | | | | | | | | | | | | | | | | | | | | | | | | | | | | 5,628 | 137,583 |
| Shan State | 266 - Kalaw | 78,552 | 30,810 | | 936 | | | | | | | | | | | | | | | | | 768 | | 646 | | | | | | | | | | | | | | | | | | | | 1,008 | | | | | | | | | | | | 980 | | | | | | | | | | | | | | | | | | | | | | | | 5,059 | 138,719 |
| Shan State | 267 - Yassaw | 48,356 | 29,024 | | 1,203 | | | 2,069 | | | | | | | 472 | | | | | | | 1,404 | | | | | | | | | | | | | | | | | | | | | | | | | | | | | | | | | | 1,079 | | | | | | | | | | | | | | | | | | | | | | | | 5,340 | 110,478 |
| Shan State | 268 - Phekhon | 25,601 | 13,236 | | 1,181 | | | | | | | | | | | | | | | | | 869 | | | | | | 12,476 | | | | | | | | | | | | | | | | | | | | | | | | | | | | | | | | | | | | | | | | | | | | | | | | | | | | 2,485 | 66,773 |
| Shan State | 269 - Ywanan | 24,417 | 14,633 | | 1,558 | | | | | | | | | | | | | | | | | 817 | 10,882 | | | | | | | | | | | | | | | | | | | | | | | | | | | | | | | | | | | | | | | 859 | | | | | | | | | | | | | | | | | | 2,849 | 61,937 |
| Shan State | 270 - Pindaya | 30,601 | 18,774 | | 542 | | | | | | | | | | | | | | | | | 473 | 3,736 | | | | | | | | | | | | | | | | | | | | | | | | | | | | | | | | | | | | | | | 420 | | | | | | | | | | | | | | | | | | 654 | 61,187 |
| Shan State | 271 - Hopon | 12,501 | | | | | 35,225 | | | | | | | | | | | | | | | | | | 6,806 | | | | | | | | | | | | | | | | | | | | | | | | | | | | | | | | | | | | | | | | | | | | | | | | | | | | | | | 4,380 | 82,572 |
| Shan State | 272 - Sesang | 10,137 | | 11,228 | | | 46,818 | | | | | | | | | | | | | | | | | | 7,290 | | | | | | | | | | | | | | | | | | | | | | | | | | | | | | | | | | | | | | | | | | | | | | | | | | | | | | | 6,035 | 106,163 |
| Shan State | 273 - Pinlaung | 16,276 | | 9,270 | | | 78,172 | | | | | | | | | | | | | | | | | 1,085 | 5,094 | | | | | | | | | | | | | | | | | | | | | | | | | | | | | | | | | | | | | | | | | | | | | | | | | | | | | | | 5,196 | 133,303 |
| Shan State | 274 - Kutkai | 10,261 | 22,191 | 4,529 | | | | | | | | | 18,023 | | | | | | | | | | | | | | | | | | | | | | | | | | | | | | | | | | | | | | | | | | | | | | | | | | | | | | | | | | | | | | | | | | | 4,829 | 128,182 |
| Shan State | 275 - Namkham | 3,467 | 5,875 | 14,444 | | | | | | | | 13,134 | 25,776 | | | | | | | | | | | | | | | | | | | | | | | | | | | | | | | | | | | | | | | | | | | | | | | | | | | | | | | | | | | | | | | | | | | 2,545 | 86,634 |
| Shan State | 276 - Muse | 13,262 | 10,833 | 24,281 | 607 | | | | | | | 2,477 | 6,511 | | | | | | | | | | | | | | | | | | | | | | | | | | | | | | | | | | | | | | | 2,370 | | | | | | | | | | | | | | | | | | | | | | | | | | | | 2,818 | 115,716 |
| Shan State | 277 - Mabin | 18,380 | 6,842 | | 1,151 | | | | | | | | | | | | | | | | | | | | | | | | | | | | | | | | | | | | | | | | | | | | | | | | | | | | | | | | | | | | | | | | | | | | | | | | | | | 1,181 | 32,918 |
| Shan State | 278 - Moeik | 18,891 | 5,075 | | 815 | | | 1,403 | | | | 7,441 | | | | | | | | | | | | | | | | | | | | | | | | | | | | | | | | | | | | | | | | | | | | | | | | | | | | | | | | | | | | | | | | | | | | 1,978 | 47,937 |
| Shan State | 279 - Matman | | 7,740 | | | | | | | | | | | | | | | | | | | | | | | | | | | | | | | | | 1,125 | | | | | | | | | | | | | | | | | | | | | | | | | | | | | | | | | | | | | | | | | | | | 751 | 11,608 |
| Shan State | 280 - Panghsang (Pangkham) | Election not held | | | | | | | | | | | | | | | | | | | | | | | | | | | | | | | | | | | | | | | | | | | | | | | | | | | | | | | | | | | | | | | | | | | | | | | | | | | | | | | |
| Shan State | 281 - Naphan | Election not held | | | | | | | | | | | | | | | | | | | | | | | | | | | | | | | | | | | | | | | | | | | | | | | | | | | | | | | | | | | | | | | | | | | | | | | | | | | | | | | |
| Shan State | 282 - Mongsat | 7,162 | 20,747 | | | | | | | | | 2,386 | | | | | | | | | | | | | | | | | | | | | | | | 749 | | | | | 2,345 | | | | | | | | | | | | | | | | | | | | | | | | | | | | | | | | | | | | | | | 4,553 | 59,703 |
| Shan State | 283 - Mong Ton | 3,032 | 18,552 | 4,543 | | | | | | | | | | | | | | | | | | | | | | | | | | | | | | | | | | | | | 1,301 | | | | | | | | | | | | | | | | | | | | | | | | | | | | | | | | | | | | | | | 2,388 | 47,687 |
| Shan State | 284 - Tan Yang | 5,091 | 17,110 | 29,618 | | | | | | | | 1,965 | | | | | | | | | | | | | | | | | | | | | | | | | | | | | | | | | | | | | | | | | | | | | | | | | | | | | | | | | | | | | | | | | | | | 5,276 | 111,686 |
| Shan State | 285 - Mong Ye | 1,902 | 3,726 | 18,350 | | | | | | | | 1,720 | | | | | | | | | | | | | | | | | | | | | | | | | | | | | | | | | | | | | | | | | | | | | | | | | | | | | | | | | | | | | | | | | | | | 3,071 | 48,679 |
| Shan State | 286 - Lashio | 47,505 | 28,149 | 24,163 | 860 | | | | | | | 4,774 | 2,773 | | | | | | | | | | | 580 | | | | | | | | | | 6,757 | | | | | | | | | | | | | 791 | | | | | | | | | | | | | | | | | | | | | | | | | | | | | | | | | 7,332 | 220,399 |
| Shan State | 287 - Sinni | 5,392 | 6,559 | 9,981 | | | | | | | | 3,801 | | | | | | | | | | | | | | | | | | | | | | | | | | | | | | | | | | | | | | | | | | | | | | | | | | | | | | | | | | | | | | | | | | | | 1,822 | 38,719 |
| Shan State | 288 - Kwanlong | 3,918 | 10,707 | | | | | | | | | | | | | | | | | | | | | | | | | | | | | | | 2,516 | | | | | | | | | | | | | | | | | | | | | | | | 1,589 | | | | | | | | | | | | | | | | | | | | | | 1,377 | 38,190 |
| Shan State | 289 - Mong Nai | 3,124 | 5,224 | 8,560 | | | | | | | | 3,944 | | | | | | | | | | | | | | | | | | | | | | | | | | | | | | | | | | | | | | | | | | | | | | | | | | | | | | | | | | | | | | | | | | | | 1,567 | 28,817 |
| Shan State | 290 - Mongpan | 816 | 4,563 | 2,374 | | | | | | | | 2,870 | | | | | | | | | | | | | | | | | | | | | | | | | | | | | | | | | | | | | | | | | | | | | | | | | | | | | | | | | | | | | | | | | | | | 598 | 13,346 |
| Shan State | 291 - Maukma | 1,524 | 6,860 | 5,080 | | | | | | | | | | | | | | | | | | | | | 2,954 | | | | | | | | | | | | | | | | | | | | | | | | | | | | | | | | | | | | | | | | | | | | | | | | | | | | | | | 2,206 | 22,203 |
| Shan State | 292 - Langkho | 1,730 | 5,491 | 11,955 | | | | | | | | 1,918 | | | | | | | | | | | | | | | | | | | | | | | | | | | | | | | | | | | | | | | | | | | | | | | | | | | | | | | | | | | | | | | | | | | | 1,091 | 26,453 |
| Shan State | 293 - Konkone | | 8,598 | | | | | | | | | | | | | | | | | | | | | | | | | | | | | | | | | | | | | | | | | | | | | | | | | | | | 926 | | | | | | | | | | | | | | | | | | | | | | | | | 903 | 27,602 |
| Shan State | 294 - Laukkai | | 14,790 | | | | | | | | | | | | | | | | | | | | | | | | | | | | | | | | | | | | | | | | | | | | | | | | | | | | 1,211 | | | | | | | | | | | | | | | | | | | | | | | | | 2,044 | 56,061 |
| Shan State | 295 - Kyethi | 1,992 | 5,047 | 18,040 | | | | | | | | 1,049 | | | | | | | | | | | | | | | | | | | | | | | | | | | | | | | | | | | | | | | | | | | | | | | | | | | | | | | | | | | | | | | | | | | | 3,222 | 58,599 |
| Shan State | 296 - Kunhein | 2,850 | 2,700 | 9,918 | | | | | | | | 4,113 | | | | | | | | | | | | | | | | | | | | | | | | | | | | | | | | | | | | | | | | | | | | | | | | | | | | | | | | | | | | | | | | | | | | 2,706 | 45,750 |
| Shan State | 297 - Namsan | 14,241 | 18,069 | 14,552 | | | | | | | | 1,694 | | | | | | | | | | 408 | | 507 | | | | | | | | | | | | | | | | | | | | | | | | | | | | | | | | | | | | | | | | | | | | | | | | | | | | | | | | 1,943 | 92,364 |
| Shan State | 298 - Mongkai | Election not held | | | | | | | | | | | | | | | | | | | | | | | | | | | | | | | | | | | | | | | | | | | | | | | | | | | | | | | | | | | | | | | | | | | | | | | | | | | | | | | |
| Shan State | 299 - Mongshu | 5,601 | 4,161 | 12,324 | | | | | | | | 762 | | | | | | | | | | | | | | | | | | | | | | | | | | | | | | | | | | | | | | | | | | | | | | | | | | | | | | | | | | | | | | | | | | | | 2,464 | 52,444 |
| Shan State | 300 - Lechar | 1,169 | 2,407 | 11,933 | | | | | | | | 1,538 | | | | | | | | | | | | | | | | | | | | | | | | | | | | | | | | | | | | | | | | | | | | | | | | | | | | | | | | | | | | | | | | | | | | 1,627 | 39,684 |
| Shan State | 301 - Loilem | 12,324 | 17,953 | 15,761 | | | | | | | | 1,954 | | | | | | | | | | 484 | | | | | | | | | | | | | | | | | | | | | | | | | | | | | | | | | | | | | | | | | | | | | | | | | | | | | | | | | | 3,733 | 96,504 |
| Shan State | 302 - Hopan | 2,164 | 4,486 | | | | | | | | | 975 | | | | | | | | | | | | | | | | | | | | | | | | 4,984 | | | | | | | | | | | | | | | | | | | | | | | | | | | | | | | | | | | | | | | | | | | | 1,288 | 22,617 |
| Shan State | 303 - Mongmaw | Election not held | | | | | | | | | | | | | | | | | | | | | | | | | | | | | | | | | | | | | | | | | | | | | | | | | | | | | | | | | | | | | | | | | | | | | | | | | | | | | | | |
| Shan State | 304 - Panwai | Election not held | | | | | | | | | | | | | | | | | | | | | | | | | | | | | | | | | | | | | | | | | | | | | | | | | | | | | | | | | | | | | | | | | | | | | | | | | | | | | | | |
| Ayeyarwady Region | 305 - Kangyidaunt | 60,882 | 38,064 | | 1,351 | | | | | | 5,394 | | | | | | | | | | | | | | | | | | | | | | | | | | | | | | | | | | | | | | | | | | | | | | | | | | | | | | | | | | | | | | | | | | | | | 3,959 | 135,757 |
| Ayeyarwady Region | 306 - Kyaunggon | 56,489 | 43,515 | | 1,270 | | | | | | | | | | | | | | | | | | | | | | | | | | | | | | | | | | | | | | | | | | | | | | | | | | | | | | | | | | | | | | | | | | | | | | | | | | | 2,997 | 128,273 |
| Ayeyarwady Region | 307 - Kyongpyu | 96,375 | 37,675 | | 659 | | | | | | 2,632 | | | | 779 | | | | | 570 | | 1,061 | | | | | | | | | | | | | | | | | | | | | | | | | 1,099 | | | | | | | | | | | | | | | | | | | | | | | | | | | | | | | | | 5,065 | 190,203 |
| Ayeyarwady Region | 308 - Ngaputaw | 89,985 | 56,668 | | 2,187 | | | | | 2,108 | 6,236 | | | | | | | | | | | | | | | | | | | | | | | | | | | | | | | | | | | | | | | | | | | | | | | | | | | | | | | | | | | | | | | | | | | | 3,087 | 6,464 | 235,428 |
| Ayeyarwady Region | 309 - Pathein | 136,498 | 54,979 | | 3,275 | | | 2,636 | | | | | | | 1,101 | | | | | 1,422 | | | | | | | | | | | | | | | | | | | | | | | | | | | | | | | | | | | | | | | | | | | | 955 | | | | | | | | | | | | | | | 933 | 5,652 | 277,964 |
| Ayeyarwady Region | 310 - Ye Kyi | 81,524 | 27,952 | | 1,078 | | | | | | | | | | | | | | | | | 920 | | | | | | | | | | | | | | | | | | | | | | | | | | | | | | | | | | | | | | | | | | | | | | | | | | | | | | | | | 4,452 | 5,546 | 157,765 |
| Ayeyarwady Region | 311 - Tharbaung | 51,555 | 28,702 | | 3,675 | | | 1,877 | | | | | | | 510 | | | | | 1,003 | | | | | | | | | | | | | | | | | | | | | | | | | | | | | | | | | | | | | | | | | | | | | | | | | | | | | | | | | | | | 3,417 | 116,758 |
| Ayeyarwady Region | 312 - Kyaiklat | 62,007 | 35,418 | | 1,632 | | | | | | 1,836 | | | | | | | | | | | | | | | | | | | | | | | | | | | | | | | | | | | | | | | | | | | | | | | | | | | | | | | | | | | | | | | | | | | | | 3,243 | 129,165 |
| Ayeyarwady Region | 313 - Dedede | 71,619 | 30,579 | | 1,271 | | | | | | | | | | | | | | | | | | | | | | | | | | | | | | | | | | | | | | | | | | | | | | | | | | | | | | | | | | | | | | | | | | | | | | | | | | | 2,836 | 155,685 |
| Ayeyarwady Region | 314 - Pyaypon | 94,541 | 50,544 | | 1,486 | | | | | | | | | | | | | | | | | | | | | | | | | | | | | | | | | | | | | | | | | | | | | | | | | | | | | | | | | | | | | | | | | | | | | | | | | | | 4,678 | 211,639 |
| Ayeyarwady Region | 315 - Bokalay | 86,778 | 63,357 | | 1,393 | | | | | | | | | | 600 | | | | | | | | | | | | | | | | | | | | | | | | | | | | | | | | | | | | | | | | | | | | | | | | | | | | | | | | | | | | | | | | | 5,080 | 224,417 |
| Ayeyarwady Region | 316 - Nyaungdon | 90,349 | 38,515 | | 1,051 | | | | | | 1,116 | | | | | | | | | 1,682 | | | | | | | | | | | | | | | | | | | | | | | | | | | | | | | | | | | | | | | | | | | | | | | | | | | | | | | | | | | | 3,025 | 170,168 |
| Ayeyarwady Region | 317 - Danuphu | 71,353 | 33,007 | | 2,188 | | | | | | | | | | | | | | | 729 | | | | | | | | | | | | | | | 1,075 | | | | | | | | | | | | | | | | | | | | | | | | | | | | | | | | | | | | | | | | | | | | | 3,051 | 145,685 |
| Ayeyarwady Region | 318 - Pantanaw | 90,465 | 47,001 | | 1,572 | | | 1,328 | | | 13,775 | | | | | | | | | 1,803 | | | | | | | | | | | | | | | | | | | | | | | | | | | | | | | | | | | | | | | | | | | | | | | | | | | | | | | | | | | | 5,420 | 201,655 |
| Ayeyarwady Region | 319 - Maubin | 106,995 | 70,691 | | 2,293 | | | | | | | | | | | | | | | | | | | | | | | | | | | | | | | | | | | | | | | | | | | | | | | | | | | | | | | | 485 | | | | | | | | | | | | | | | | | | | 4,991 | 247,844 |
| Ayeyarwady Region | 320 - Myaungmya | 100,682 | 49,305 | | 1,512 | | | | | | 13,693 | | | | | | | | | | | | | | | | | | | | | | | | | | | | 1,485 | | | | | | | | | | | | | | | | | | | | | | | | | | | | | | | | | | | | | | | | | 5,432 | 225,903 |
| Ayeyarwady Region | 321 - Wa Khema | 103,866 | 46,953 | | 2,711 | | | | | | 11,728 | | | | | | | | | | | | | | | | | | | | | | | | | | | | | | | | | | | | | | | | | | | | | | | | | | | | | | | | | | | | | | | | | | | | 967 | 5,048 | 227,946 |
| Ayeyarwady Region | 322 - Einme | 59,174 | 35,905 | | 2,164 | | | 2,901 | | | 4,837 | | | | 372 | | | | | | | | | | | | | 4,027 | | | | | | | | | | | | | | | | | | | 1,599 | | | | | | | | | | | | | | | | | | | | | | | | | | | | | | | | | 4,952 | 151,592 |
| Ayeyarwady Region | 323 - Mawlamyine Kyun | 96,208 | 60,402 | | 2,416 | | | | | | | | | | | | | | | 820 | | | | | | | | | | | | | | | | | | | | | | | | | | | | | | | | | | | | | | | | | | | | | | | | | | | | | | | | | | | 1,227 | 6,443 | 219,638 |
| Ayeyarwady Region | 324 - Labutta | 94,623 | 48,719 | | 1,112 | | | | | | | | | | | | | | | | | | | | | | | | | | | | | | | | | | | | | | 1,319 | | | | | | | | | | | | | | | | | | | | | | | | | | | | | | | | | | | | | 4,679 | 226,750 |
| Ayeyarwady Region | 325 - Kyangin | 45,314 | 11,092 | | 691 | | | 2,704 | | | | | | | | | | | | | | | | | | | | | | | | | | | | | | | | | | | | | | | | | | | | | | | | | | | | | | | | | | | | | | | | | | | | | | | | 1,489 | 75,640 |
| Ayeyarwady Region | 326 - Zalun | 65,749 | 35,572 | | 674 | | | | | | | | | | | | | | | | | | | | | | | | | | | | | | | | | | | | | | | | | | | | | | | | | | | | | | | | | | | | | | | | | | | | | | | | | | | 1,231 | 133,576 |
| Ayeyarwady Region | 327 - Myan Aung | 93,268 | 36,663 | | 634 | | | | | | | | | | 415 | | | | | | | | | | | | | | | | | | | | | | | | | | | | | | | | | | | | | | | | | | | | | | | | | | | | | | | | | | | | | | | | | 1,881 | 170,887 |
| Ayeyarwady Region | 328 - Laymyang | 36,722 | 22,527 | | 2,683 | | | | | | | | | | | | | | | 1,021 | | | | | | | | | | | | | | | | | | | | | | | | | | | | | | | | | | | | | | | | | | | | | | | | | | | | | | | | | | | | 1,700 | 83,457 |
| Ayeyarwady Region | 329 - Hinthada | 138,687 | 64,264 | | 1,280 | | | 1,673 | | | 1,282 | | | | | | | | | | | | | | | | | | | | | | | | | | | | | | | | | | | | | | | | | | | | | | | | | | | | | | | | | | | | | | | | | | | | | 5,209 | 272,502 |
| Ayeyarwady Region | 330 - Angapu | 79,311 | 46,201 | | 892 | | | | | | | | | | | | | | | 963 | | | | | | | | | | | | | | | | | | | | | | | | | | | | | | | | | | | | | | | | | | | | | | | | | | | | | | | | | | | 1,408 | 2,361 | 164,855 |

=== State and Regional Hluttaws ===
| Party | Seats | +/– |
|---|---|---|
| National League for Democracy | 501 | +25 |
| Union Solidarity and Development Party | 38 | –35 |
| Shan Nationalities League for Democracy | 27 | +2 |
| Arakan National Party | 7 | –15 |
| Ta'ang National Party | 7 | 0 |
| Pa-O National Organisation | 7 | +1 |
| Mon Unity Party | 6 | +6 |
| Kayah State Democratic Party | 3 | +3 |
| Kachin State People's Party | 3 | 0 |
| Arakan Front Party | 2 | +2 |
| Wa National Unity Party | 2 | +1 |
| Chin National League for Democracy | 1 | +1 |
| New Democratic Party (Kachin) | 1 | +1 |
| Lahu National Development Party | 1 | 0 |
| Lisu National Development Party | 1 | –1 |
| Kayin People's Party | 1 | 0 |
| Shan Nationalities Democratic Party | 1 | 0 |
| Zomi Congress for Democracy | 1 | –1 |
| Democratic Party | 0 | –1 |
| Kokang Democracy and Unity Party | 0 | –1 |
| Tai-Leng Nationalities Development Party | 0 | –1 |
| Independents | 2 | +1 |
| Cancelled due to insurgency | 48 | – |
| Military appointees | 220 | 0 |
| Total | 880 | 0 |
Source: UEC

| State/Region | NLD | USDP | Others | Total |
|---|---|---|---|---|
State
| Chin | 16 | | 2 | 18 |
| Kachin | 28 | 4 | 8 | 40 |
| Kayah | 9 | 3 | 3 | 15 |
| Kayin | 13 | 2 | 2 | 17 |
| Mon | 17 | | 6 | 23 |
| Rakhine | 5 | 1 | 9 | 15 |
| Shan | 33 | 24 | 48 | 105 |
Regional
| Ayeyarwady | 54 | | | 54 |
| Bago | 57 | | | 57 |
| Magway | 51 | | | 51 |
| Mandalay | 57 | | | 57 |
| Sagaing | 74 | 2 | | 76 |
| Taninthayi | 21 | | | 21 |
| Yangon | 89 | 2 | 1 | 92 |
| Total | 501 | 38 | 73 | 612 |

The list of military appointees was published as the UEC Announcement 3/2016.

==== Ethnic Affairs Ministers ====
29 Ministers of Ethnic Affairs for the State and Regional Assemblies were up for election.

| Party | Seats | +/– |
|---|---|---|
| National League for Democracy | 23 | +2 |
| Mon Unity Party | 1 | +1 |
| Kayan National Party | 1 | +1 |
| Lahu National Development Party | 1 | 0 |
| Lisu National Development Party | 1 | 0 |
| Independents | 2 | +1 |
| Total | 29 | 0 |
Source: UEC

| State/Region | NLD | USDP | Others | Total |
|---|---|---|---|---|
State
| Chin | | | | |
| Kachin | | | | |
| Kayah | | | | |
| Kayin | | | | |
| Mon | | | | |
| Rakhine | | | | |
| Shan | | | | |
Regional
| Ayeyarwady | | | | |
| Bago | | | | |
| Magway | | | | |
| Mandalay | | | | |
| Sagaing | | | | |
| Taninthayi | | | | |
| Yangon | | | | |
| Total | | | | |

Elected Ethnic Affairs Ministers
| Division | Ethnicity | Political Party | Current name |
|---|---|---|---|
| Kachin State (4) | Bamar | NLD | Khin Maung Myint (a.k.a. U Dake) |
| Kachin State (4) | Lisu | NLD | Arti Yaw Han |
| Kachin State (4) | Rawang | NLD | Yan Nann Phone |
| Kachin State (4) | Shan | NLD | Sai Sein Lin |
| Kayah State (1) | Bamar | USDP | Hla Myo Swe |
| Kayin State (3) | Bamar | NLD | Taza Htut Hlaing Htwe |
| Kayin State (3) | Pa-O | NLD | Khun Myo Tint |
| Kayin State (3) | Mon | NLD | Min Tin Win |
| Mon State (3) | Bamar | NLD | Shwe Myint |
| Mon State (3) | Kayin | NLD | Aung Myint Khaing |
| Mon State (3) | Pa-O | NLD | San Wint Khaing |
| Rakhine State (1) | Chin | NLD | Pone Bwe |
| Shan State (7) | Akha | ANDP | Are Bay Hla |
| Shan State (7) | Bamar | USDP | Aung Than Maung |
| Shan State (7) | Intha | NLD | Tun Hlaing |
| Shan State (7) | Kachin | Independent | Zote Daung |
| Shan State (7) | Kayan (a.k.a. Padaung) | NLD | Khun Aye Maung |
| Shan State (7) | Lahu | LHNDP | Yaw That |
| Shan State (7) | Lisu | LNDP | Gu Sar |
| Ayeyarwady Region (2) | Kayin | NLD | Gar Moe Myat Myat Thu |
| Ayeyarwady Region (2) | Rakhine | NLD | Tin Saw |
| Bago Region (1) | Kayin | NLD | Naw Pwal Say |
| Magway Region (1) | Chin | NLD | Hla Tun |
| Mandalay Region (1) | Shan | NLD | Sai Kyaw Zaw |
| Sagaing Region (2) | Chin | NLD | Lal Htaung Htan |
| Sagaing Region (2) | Shan | TLNDP | Hmwe Hmwe Khin |
| Tanintharyi Region (1) | Kayin | NLD | Saw Lu Ka |
| Yangon Region (2) | Kayin | NLD | Pan Thinzar Myo |
| Yangon Region (2) | Rakhine | ANP | Zaw Aye Maung |

== Aftermath ==
=== Coup ===
A coup d'état in Myanmar began on the morning of 1 February 2021, when democratically elected members of the country's ruling party, the National League for Democracy (NLD), were deposed by the Tatmadaw, Myanmar's military, which then vested power in a military junta. Acting President of Myanmar Myint Swe proclaimed a year-long state of emergency and declared power had been transferred to Commander-in-Chief of Defence Services Senior General Min Aung Hlaing. It declared the results of the November 2020 general election invalid and stated its intent to hold a new election at the end of the state of emergency. The coup d'état occurred the day before the Parliament of Myanmar was to swear in the members elected in the 2020 election, thereby preventing this from occurring.

President Win Myint and State Counsellor Aung San Suu Kyi were detained, along with ministers, their deputies, and members of Parliament. On 1 February 2021, Win Myint and Aung San Suu Kyi were arrested on charges that independent analysts regarded as part of an attempt to legitimize the military's seizure of power. Both were remanded in custody for two weeks. Between 16 February and 1 April, five additional charges were leveled against Aung San Suu Kyi.

Armed insurgencies by the People's Defence Force of the National Unity Government erupted throughout Myanmar in response to the military government's crackdown on anti-coup protests, leading to a multi-sided civil war still ongoing as of 2026.

As of 13 March 2024, at least 50,000 people, including at least 8,000 civilians (570 of whom were children), have been killed by the junta forces and 26,234 individuals have been arrested. In March 2021, three prominent members of the National League for Democracy (NLD) died in police custody, and in July 2022, the junta executed four pro-democracy activists.

In honour of the anniversary for Myanmar's 76th year of independence in January 2024, more than 9,000 prisoners are slated to receive amnesty, leading to their release from prison.

In February 2024, it was announced that compulsory military service would be implemented. All men aged 18 to 35 and women aged 18 to 27 were required to serve up to two years under military command and specialists such as doctors aged up to 45 were to serve for three years.

== See also ==
- 2021 Myanmar coup d'état
- 2021–2022 Myanmar protests
