= List of political and military organisations in Myanmar =

This is list of political and military organisations in Myanmar.

== 8 ==
- 88 Generation Student Youths (Union of Myanmar) (88GSY)

== A–B ==
- All Burma Federation of Student Unions (ABFSU)
- All Burma Monks' Alliance
- All Burma Students’ Democratic Front (ABSDF)
- All National Races Unity and Development Party (Kayah State) (ANRUDP)
- All Mon Region Democracy Party (AMRDP)
- Assistance Association for Political Prisoners (Burma) (AAPP)
- Arakan League for Democracy (ALD)
- Arakan Liberation Army (ALA)
- Arakan Liberation Party (ALP)
- Asho Chin National Party (ACNP)
- Border Guard Forces (BGF)
- Burma Army ("Tatmadaw." BA)
- Burma Democratic Concern (BDC)
- Burmese Rohingya Association in Thailand (BRAT)

== C–I ==
- Chin National Council (CNC)
- Chin National League for Democracy
- Chin National Front (CNF)
- Chin National Party (CNP)
- Chin National Vanguard Party (CNVP)
- Chin Progressive Party (CPP)
- Committee for Internally Displaced Karen People (CIDKP)
- Communist Party of Burma (CPB)
- Democracy and Peace Party (DPP)
- Democratic Party for Myanmar New Society (DPMNS)
- Democratic Karen Buddhist Army (DKBA)
- Democratic Organisation for Kayan National Unity
- Democratic Party (Myanmar) (DPM)
- Ethnic National Development Party (ENDP)
- Federation of Trade Unions of Burma (FTUB)
- Free Burma Project (FBP)
- Free Burma Rangers (FBR)
- Good Life Club (GLC)
- Human Rights Foundation of Monland (HURFOM)
- The House of Peace and Nonviolence
- Inn National Progressive Party (INPP)
- International Foundation for Burma National Congress (IFBNC)

== K ==
- Kachin Defence Army (KDA)
- Kachin Independence Army (KIA)
- Kachin National Organisation (KNO)
- Kachin State National Congress for Democracy
- Kachin State Progressive Party (KSPP)
- Kaman National Progressive Party (KNPP)
- Karen History and Culture Preservation Society (KHCPS)
- Karen Human Rights Group (KHRG)
- Karen National Defence Organisation (KNDO)
- Karen National Liberation Army (KNLA)
- Karen National Union (KNU)
- KNU/KNLA Peace Council
- Karen Peace Council (KPC)
- Karenni Army (KA)
- Karenni National Progressive Party (KNPP)
- Karenni National People’s Liberation Front (KNPLF)
- Karenni Nationalities People's Liberation Front (KNPLF)
- Karenni National Women's Organisation (KNWO)
- Kayah State Nationalities League for Democracy
- Kayan National Party (KNP)
- Kayan New Land Party (KNLP)
- Kayin People's Party (KPP)
- Kayin State Democracy and Development Party (KSDDP)
- Khami National Development Party (KNDP)
- Kokang Democracy and Unity Party (KDUP)
- Kokang Revolutionary Force (KRF) (or 'Resistance')

== L–M ==
- Lahu National Development Party (LNDP)
- Lahu National United Party (LNUP)
- Manipur rebels
- Modern People Party (MPP)
- Mon National Defence Army (MNDA)
- Mon National Democratic Front (MNDF)
- Mon National Liberation Army (MNLA), the armed wing of the New Mon State Party (NMSP)
- Mon People's Front (MPF)
- Monland Restoration Army (MRA)
- Mong Tai Army (MTA)
- Mro or Khami National Solidarity Organisation (MKNSO)
- Mro National Party (MNP)
- Myanmar Democracy Congress (MDC)
- Myanmar National Democratic and Development Party (MNDDP)
- Myanmar Unity Revolution Supreme Council
- Myanmar Unity Revolutionary Council

== N ==
- Naga National Council (NNC)
- Naga Hills Regional Progressive Party
- National Democratic Alliance Army (NDAA)
- National Democratic Force (NDF)
- National Democratic Front (NDF)
- National Democratic Party for Development (NDPD)
- National Democratic Party for Human Rights
- National Development and Peace Party (NDPP)
- National League for Democracy (NLD)
- National Political Alliances League (NPAL)
- National Reconciliation Program (NRP)
- National Socialist Council of Nagaland (NSCN)
- National Solidarity and Development Party (NSDP)
- National United Front of Arakan (NUFA)
- National Unity Party (NUP)
- New Democratic Army - Kachin (NDAK)
- New Mon State Party (NMSP)
- Noom Suk Harn
- Northern Shan State Progressive Party (NSSPP)

== P–R ==
- Pa-O National Organisation (PNO)
- Palaung National Front (PNF)
- Palaung State Liberation Army (PSLA)
- Party for National Democracy
- People’s New Society Party (PNSP)
- Peace and Diversity Party (PDP)
- Phalon-Sawaw Democratic Party (PSDP)
- Rakhine Nationalities Development Party (RNDP)
- Rakhine State National Force of Myanmar (RSNF)
- Regional Development Party (Pyay) (RDPP)
- Rohingya Islamic Revolutionary Front (RIRF)
- Rohingya Youth Development Forum (RYDF) (RYDF)

== S–Z ==
- Shan National Army (SNA)
- Shan National Independence Army (SNIA)
- Shan National United Front (SNUF)
- Shan Nationalities Democratic Party (SNDP)
- Shan Nationalities League for Democracy (SNLD)
- Shan Nationalities People's Liberation Organisation (SNPLO)
- Shan People's Liberation Army (SPLA)
- Shan State Army (SSA)
- Shan State Army - North (SSA-N)
- Shan State Army - South (SSA-S)
- Shan State Independence Army (SSIA)
- Shan State National Army (SSNA)
- Shan State Progress Party (SSPP)
- Shan State Revolutionary Army (SSRA)
- Shan United Army (SUA)
- Shan United Revolutionary Army (SURA)
- Shan State Volunteer Force (SSVF)
- State Law and Order Restoration Council (SLORC), the military dictatorship of Burma
- State Peace and Development Council (SPDC), the military dictatorship of Burma, formerly the SLORC
- Ta-ang (Palaung) National League for Democracy
- Taaung (Palaung) National Party (TPNP)
- Tai Independence Army (TIA)
- Tai National Army (TNA)
- Tai Revolutionary Council (TRC) (or 'Tailand')
- Tai Revolutionary Army (TRA) (or 'Tailand')
- Union Democratic Party (UnionDP)
- Union Election Commissions (UEC)
- Union of Karen/Kayin League (UKL)
- Union of Myanmar Federation of National Politics (UMFNP)
- Union Pa-O National Organisation
- Union Solidarity and Development Party (USDP)
- United Democratic Party (UnitedDP)
- United Shan Patriotic Council (USPC)
- United Wa State Army (UWSA)
- United Wa State Party (UWSP)
- Unity and Democracy Party of Kachin State (UDPKS)
- Vingngun Ka Kwe Ye
- Wa Democratic Party (WDP)
- Wa National Council (WNC)
- Wa National Army (WNA)
- Wa National Organisation (WNO)
- Wa National Unity Party (WNUP)
- Wuntharnu NLD (Union of Myanmar) (WNLD)
- Zomi National Congress (ZNC)
