= Khin Waing Kyi =

Burmese politician

- ခင်ဝိုင်းကြည်
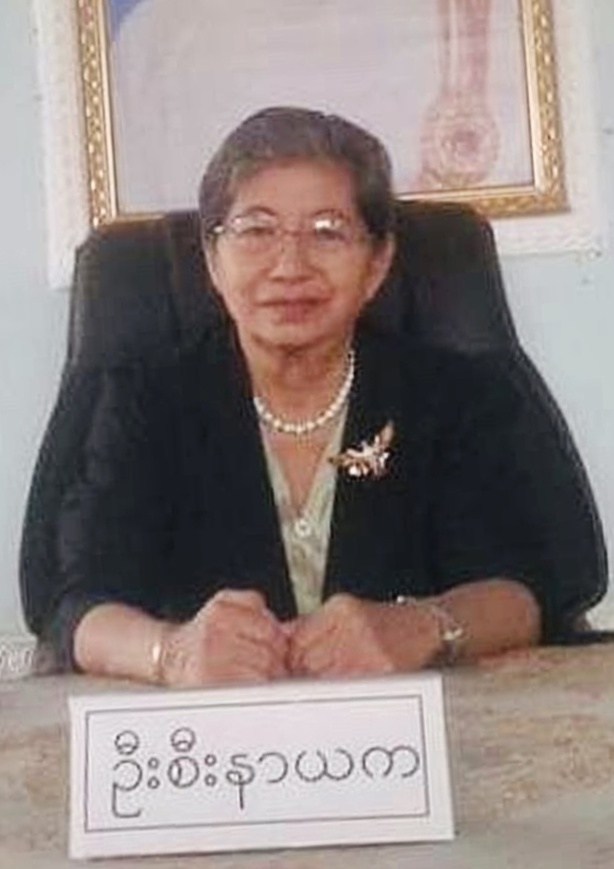
- Khin Waing Kyi in 2014

Member of the House of Nationalities
- In office 31 January 2011 – 29 January 2016
- Preceded by: Position established
- Succeeded by: Htay Kywe
- Constituency: Yangon Region № 1 North Dagon, East Dagon, and North Okkalapa Townships

Personal details
- Born: 9 February 1947 (age 79) Wetlet, British Burma
- Party: Burmese Socialist Programme (before 1988); Federation of National Politics (2008–09); National Democratic Force (2010–16); Independent (2017–present)
- Spouse: Khin Maung Myint
- Children: May Thet San; Cho Thet San
- Parent(s): Kyaw Hlaing (father); Kyi Thein (mother)
- Occupation: Politician

Khin Waing Kyi (Burmese: ခင်ဝိုင်းကြည်; born 9 February 1947) is a Burmese politician who served as an MP in the House of Nationalities for Yangon Region № 1 constituency from 2011 to 2016.

She is one of the most hardcore nationalist politicians and supporters of the controversial Patriotic Association of Myanmar. In 2016, she lobbied against the constitutional amendment that could allow Aung San Suu Kyi to become President of Myanmar.

== Early life and career ==
Khin Waing Kyi was born in Wetlet Township, British Burma to Kyaw Hlaing and Kyi Thein. She attended Pale Ngwe Yaung School and No.4 Women's High School in Mandalay. She enrolled at the Mandalay Arts and Science University but dropped out in her second year.

She worked as a teacher, and later worked as a managing director of Human Resources Co., Ltd. and D Sliver Palace Co., Ltd.

== Political career ==
=== Political movements ===
She worked as a youth organization committee member of then ruling Burmese Socialist Programme Party in Madaya Township, Mandalay Division. She later served as a joint-secretary general of trade unions in the Jute Enterprise under the Ministry of Industry No.1 during 1988 uprisings. Then she was forced to retire when the State Law and Order Restoration Council seized power in the same year.

She served as vice chair of the Rangoon Division party branch, and as a central executive committee member of the Union of Myanmar Federation of National Politics in 2008-09.

=== Parliamentary career ===
Khin Waing Kyi is a senior party member of the National Democratic Force. She submitted a proposal to introduce proportional representation. She was close to Ma Ba Tha and proved to be one of the most hardcore nationalist voices in the democratic contingent in Parliament. At the Amyotha Hluttaw, she discussed about managing the plastic items which should be systematically discarded with rules and regulations by the government.

She also introduced a proposal to switch to proportional representation system from the first-past-the-post (FPTP) system. She said a “The upper house concluded – based on debate over to bring together members of the parliamentary Bill Commission with representatives of the Union Election Commission to study proportional representation and discuss approaches which could be adopted in this new system".

In the 2015 election, she ran for House of Representatives seat from the Meiktila Township constituency, but lost to Maung Thin, a Union Solidarity and Development Party candidate.

== Public image ==
In 2013, Khin Waing Kyi submitted the proposal for the religious conversion and population-control bills to parliament, which were introduced by the controversial monk, Ashin Wirathu. Women’s rights advocates and several of ethnic and religious minorities were concerned that the bills would deal a blow to religious freedom, undermine women’s ability to make independent choices about their faith, partner and family, and exacerbate existing interfaith tensions between Muslim and Buddhist communities.
