= Sai Hsai Kyauk Sam =

Burmese politician

Member of the Amyotha Hluttaw
- Incumbent
- Assumed office 31 January 2011
- Constituency: Shan StateNo.6

Member of the Amyotha Hluttaw
- Incumbent
- Assumed office 1 February 2016
- Constituency: Shan State No.6
- Majority: 34926 votes

Personal details
- Born: 22 October 1951 (age 74) Keng Tung, Shan State, Burma (Myanmar)
- Party: Union Solidarity and Development Party
- Parent: U Sam (father)
- Education: Animal breeding and medical university University of Foreign Languages, Yangon Dip in French

Dr. Sai Hsai Kyauk Sam (Burmese: စိုင်းဆိုင်ကျောက်ဆမ်, born 22 October 1951) is a Burmese politician who currently serves as a House of Nationalities member of parliament for Shan State № 6 constituency.

In the 2010 Myanmar general election, he was elected as an Amyotha Hluttaw MP and elected representative from Shan State № 6 parliamentary constituency.

== Early life and education ==
He was born on 22 October 1951 in Keng Tung, Shan State, Burma (Myanmar) and graduated with B.V.S. and Dip in French from Yangon. His previous job was Amyotha Hluttaw MP.

== Political career ==
He is a member of the Union Solidarity and Development Party. In the 2015 Myanmar general election, he was elected as an Amyotha Hluttaw MP, winning a majority of 34926 votes and elected representative from Shan State № 6 parliamentary constituency.
