= Ethnic National Development Party =

Ethnic National Development Party တိုင်းရင်းသားလူမျိုးစုများ ဖွံ့ဖြိုးရေးပါတီ
- Abbreviation: ENDP
- Senior figures: Pu Hiva; Pu Vâchei
- Founded: 16 June 2010
- Headquarters: Matupi Township, Chin State
- Slogan: "Equality, freedom and justice."
- Seats in the Amyotha Hluttaw: 0 / 224
- Seats in the Pyithu Hluttaw: 0 / 440
- Seats in the State and Regional Hluttaws: 0 / 880

Party flag

The Ethnic National Development Party (Burmese: တိုင်းရင်းသားလူမျိုးနွယ်စုများ ဖွံ့ဖြိုးရေးပါတီ; abbreviated ENDP) is a registered political party in Myanmar. It won a single seat in the 2010 general election, after its candidate Pu Van Cing narrowly defeated his opponent from the Chin Progressive Party (CPP). The party did not win any seats in the 2015 general election.
