= Sai San Aung =

Burmese politician

Member of the Amyotha Hluttaw
- Incumbent
- Assumed office 1 February 2016
- Constituency: Shan State No.12
- Majority: 7999 votes

Personal details
- Born: 25 March 1959 (age 67) Shan State, Burma (Myanmar)
- Party: Union Solidarity and Development Party
- Parent(s): San Kwan (father); Aye Eain (mother)
- Education: Mandalay University B.A (History)

Sai San Aung (Burmese: စိုင်းစံအောင်, born 25 March 1959) is a Burmese politician who currently serves as a House of Nationalities member of parliament for Shan State № 12 constituency.

== Early life and education ==
He was born on 25 March 1959 in Shan State, Burma (Myanmar).

== Political career ==
He is a member of the Union Solidarity and Development Party. In the Myanmar general election, 2015, he was elected as an Amyotha Hluttaw MP, winning a majority of 7999 votes and elected representative from Shan State № 12 parliamentary constituency.
