= Lin Wai Phyo Latt =

Burmese politician (born 1980)

Dr Lin Wai Phyo Latt

Member of the Amyotha Hluttaw
- Incumbent
- Assumed office 1 February 2016
- Constituency: Tanintharyi No.5
- Majority: 46,420 votes

Personal details
- Born: 1 June 1980 (age 45) Myeik, Burma (Myanmar)
- Party: National League for Democracy
- Spouse: Kyin San
- Parent(s): Tin Myo(father); Yu Yu Wai(mother)

Lin Wai Phyo Latt (Burmese: လင်းဝေဖြိုးလတ် , born 1 June 1980) is a Burmese politician who currently serves as a House of Nationalities member of parliament for Tanintharyi No. 5 constituency. He is a member of National League for Democracy.

== Early life and education ==
Lin was born on 1 June 1980 in Myeik, Myanmar. He graduated M.B.B.S from University of Medicine, Yangon. His former work is Medical Doctor.

== Political career ==
Lin was elected as an Amyotha Hluttaw MP, winning a majority of 46,420 votes from Tanintharyi Region No.5 parliamentary constituency.

He also serves as a member of Amyotha Hluttaw Health, Sports and Culture Committee.
