= 2010 Myanmar general election =

- 7 November 2010

330 of the 440 seats in the Pyithu Hluttaw 221 seats needed for a majority 168 of the 224 seats in the Amyotha Hluttaw 113 seats needed for a majority
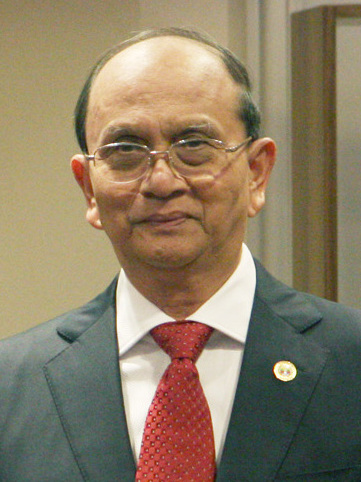

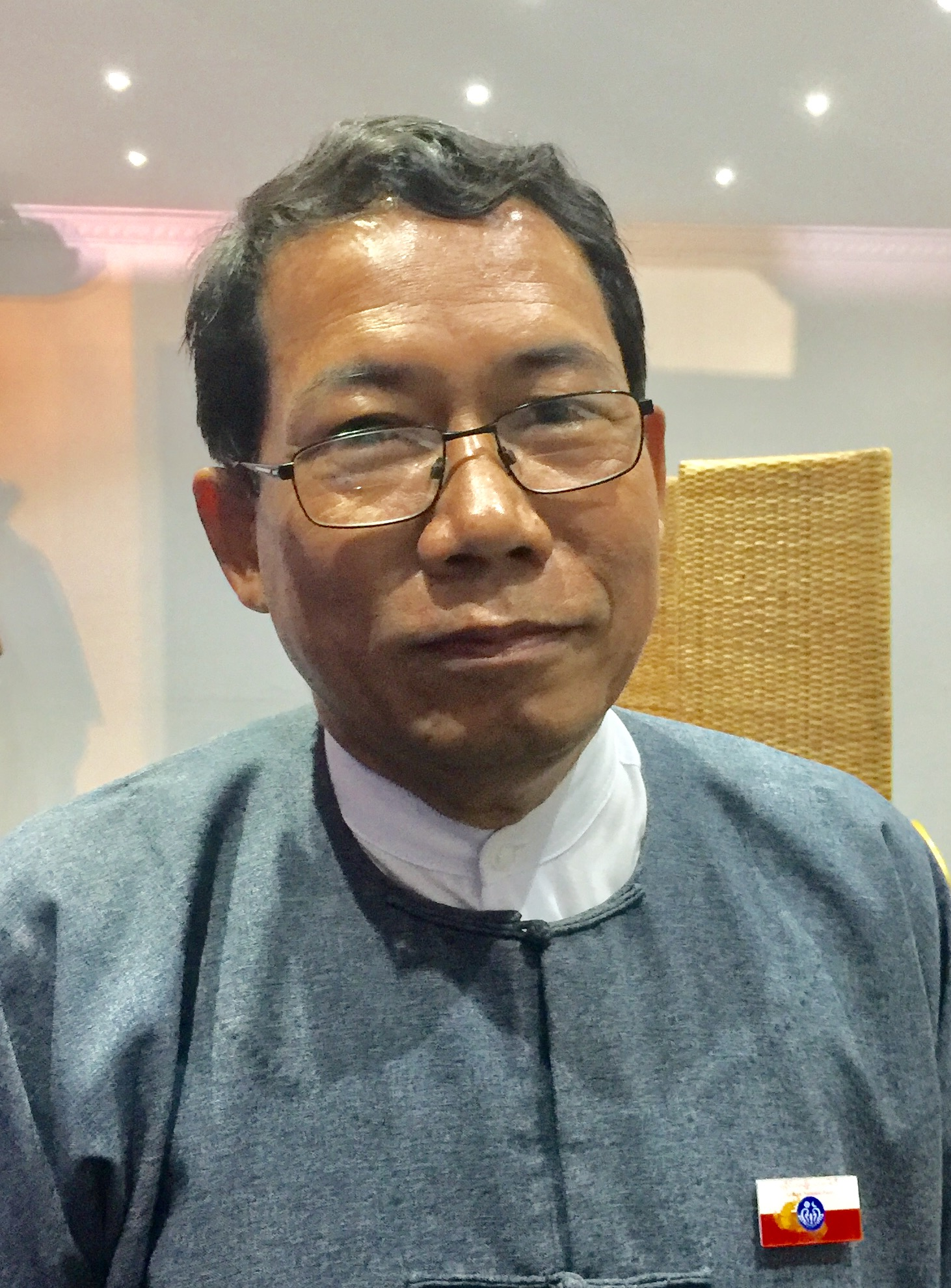
	First party	Second party	Third party
		SNDP	NUP
Leader	Thein Sein	Sai Ai Pao	Tun Yi
Party	USDP	SNDP	NUP
Leader's seat	Zabuthiri (Pyithu)	Did not stand	Did not stand
Seats won	259 P / 129 A	18 P / 3 A	12 P / 5 A
	Fourth party	Fifth party
		NDF
Leader	Aye Maung	Khin Maung Swe
Party	RNDP	NDF
Leader's seat	Did not stand	Did not stand
Seats won	9 P / 7 A	8 P / 4 A
- Results of the election in the Pyithu Hluttaw and Amyotha Hluttaw. Includes by-elections up to December 2014.
Prime Minister before election
Thein Sein
USDP
Elected President
Thein Sein
USDP

General elections were held in Myanmar on 7 November 2010, in accordance with the new constitution, which was approved in a referendum held in May 2008. The election date was announced by the State Peace and Development Council (SPDC) on 13 August.

The elections were the fifth step of the seven-step "roadmap to democracy" proposed by the SPDC in 2003, the sixth and seventh steps being the convening of elected representatives and the building of a modern, democratic nation, respectively. However, the National League for Democracy boycotted the elections. The result was a sweeping victory for the Union Solidarity and Development Party, which won nearly 80% of seats contested across both houses. The United Nations expressed concern about the fairness of the elections, and western countries dismissed them as fraudulent.

Due to the strict separation of powers in the constitution, members elected to the Pyidaungsu Hluttaw were automatically disqualified from their seats if they accepted appointment to an executive or judicial body. As a result, many elected members elected were quickly disqualified from their seats after accepting appointment to bodies such as the Cabinet of Myanmar. By-elections to fill 48 vacancies left by such appointments as well as by resignations and deaths were held in April 2012.

== Background ==
Going into the elections, a debate emerged around whether Aung San Suu Kyi would be disqualified from contesting the elections under Article 59F of the new constitution, which banned from the Presidency any person whose spouse or children are foreign citizens. The United Nations, members of ASEAN, and Western nations, however, insisted that the elections would not be credible without the participation of Suu Kyi.

The National League for Democracy (NLD) had set a number of conditions for participating in the poll, including changes to the constitution to reduce the army's influence, international supervision for free and fair polls, and freeing all political prisoners including Suu Kyi. Senior General Than Shwe, leader of the ruling military junta, has pledged to release political prisoners in an amnesty before the election, though he has not stated when this would occur. On 11 August 2009, Suu Kyi was sentenced to imprisonment for three years with hard labour over a trespass incident. This sentence was commuted by the military rulers to further house arrest of eighteen months. The NLD later announced they would not take part in the election due to the election laws.

Key ministries including justice, defence and the interior will remain under the control of the military and under the 2008 constitution, a quarter of the 440 parliament seats will be reserved for the military officials. People holding military positions are not permitted to contest the election; as such, 20 members of the junta, including Prime Minister Thein Sein, retired from their posts to participate in the election.

=== New election laws ===
The first of five election laws was announced in March 2010, concerning the creation of an election commission. The Union Election Commission Law states that the military government will appoint all members of the commission and have the final say over the election results. Members of the commission must be "an eminent person, to have integrity and experience, to be loyal to the state and its citizens". A 17-member election commission was later named, headed by a former military officer.

The second law bans anyone currently serving a prison term from belonging to a political party, and therefore over 2,000 political prisoners will not be able to participate, possibly including Aung San Suu Kyi (depending on whether her house arrest is deemed to fall under the definition of "serving a prison term"). The Political Parties Registration Law also bars members of religious orders, members of insurgent groups 'as defined by the state' and foreigners from joining political parties. This separation of Buddhism and politics is a long-standing feature of Myanmar politics, dating back to before independence, and was incorporated in the 1947 independence Constitution at the request of the monkhood.

The other laws stipulate that anyone currently serving a prison term is barred from running or voting in the elections for the upper and lower houses. A 224-member House of Nationalities will have 168 elected candidates and 56 nominated by the military chief, while the 440-member House of Representatives will have 330 elected civilians and 110 military representatives. At the same time, the results of the 1990 elections were annulled as they did not comply with the new election laws.

The new laws have been described as a "farce" by the Philippines and a "mockery" by the United States.

== Political parties ==
Parties are required to have at least 1,000 members to participate in the election and had to register by 6 June. 40 parties have been approved by the Electoral Commission to contest the elections, some of which are linked to ethnic minorities.

The National League for Democracy, which overwhelmingly won the previous 1990 elections but were never allowed to take power, and the party's participation is restricted in this elections, decided not to participate. Nonetheless, some senior members have formed the National Democratic Force to contest the elections, claiming that a boycott would play into the hands of the government.

The government has established the Union Solidarity and Development Party, the successor to the mass organisation Union Solidarity and Development Association, which claims to have around half the population as members. The National Unity Party, which contested the 1990 election as the main pro-government party and won 10 seats, has also registered to run. Reuters estimates that six parties in total are allied to the government.

The new Democratic Party, established by Mya Than Than Nu, the daughter of former Prime Minister of Myanmar, U Nu and Nay Ye Ba Swe, the daughter of former Prime Minister Ba Swe, is aiming to take part in the election. Mya Than Than Nu will run as General Secretary of the party. Media coverage of the party has been banned by the military government.

Another new party is being formed comprising members of a ceasefire group and a party that won seats in the 1990 elections. Five former members of the New Mon State Party (NMSP) and five members of Mon National Democratic Front (MNDF) together with five other Mon elites, who make up the new party, founded a 15-member committee and later announced that they are not going to participate in the upcoming election.

The Shan Nationalities League for Democracy, a Shan political party that came second in the 1990 election, is participating in the election as the Shan Nationalities Democratic Party.

The SPDC has not answered opposition calls to amend the 2008 constitution or state clearly how the electoral process will be managed and the terms that new political parties can organise. In a speech to military retirees, Than Shwe said that the transition to a parliamentary system meant various parties with different opinions would appear, but he warned that the new parties should "avoid anything that leads to harming state interests".

The constituencies available for contesting are 330 civilian seats in the House of Representatives (out of 440) and 168 civilian seats in the House of Nationalities (out of 224). The remaining seats are designated for military officials and to be selected by the military chief.

During an East Asian summit in Vietnam, Foreign Minister Nyan Win confirmed Than Shwe would not be running in the election.

=== Contesting political parties ===
1. Mro or Khami National Solidarity Organisation (MKNSO)
2. National Unity Party (NUP)
3. Lahu National Development Party (LNDP)
4. Kokang Democracy and Unity Party (KDUP)
5. Pa-O National Organisation (PNO)
6. Democratic Party (Myanmar) (DPM)
7. Kayan National Party (KNP)
8. Rakhine State National Force of Myanmar (RSNF)
9. Kayin People's Party (KPP)
10. Wa National Unity Party (WNUP)
11. Ta'ang National Party (TPNP)
12. All Mon Region Democracy Party (AMRDP)
13. Democracy and Peace Party (DPP)
14. Shan Nationalities Democratic Party (SNDP)
15. United Democratic Party (UnitedDP)
16. 888 Generation Student Youths (Union of Myanmar, 8GSY)
17. Union of Myanmar Federation of National Politics (UMNPF)
18. National Political Alliances League (NPAL)
19. Democratic Party for Myanmar New Society (DPMNS)
20. Chin National Party (CNP)
21. Wuntharnu NLD (Union of Myanmar, WNLD)
22. Modern People Party (MPP)
23. Union Democratic Party (UnionDP)
24. Peace and Diversity Party (PDP)
25. Chin Progressive Party (CPP)
26. Inn National Progressive Party (INPP)
27. Rakhine Nationalities Development Party (RNDP)
28. Wa Democratic Party (WDP)
29. Phalon-Sawaw Democratic Party (PSDP)
30. National Democratic Party for Development (NDPD)
31. Union Solidarity and Development Party (USDP)
32. Ethnic National Development Party (ENDP)
33. Myanmar Democracy Congress (MDC)
34. Mro National Party (MNP)
35. Kaman National Progressive Party (KNPP)
36. Khami National Development Party (KNDP)
37. National Democratic Force (NDF)
38. Regional Development Party (Pyay, RDPP)
39. Unity and Democracy Party of Kachin State (UDPKS)

== Conduct ==
=== Cancelled elections ===
Due to ongoing insurgent violence, elections were cancelled in parts of Mon State (4.08% of village-tracts), Shan State (10.69%), Kayah State (11.93%), Kachin State (16.60%), and Kayin State (47.25%).

=== Violence ===
There have been concerns from aid agencies that the upcoming election could see a growing number of refugees fleeing to Thailand and China, due to alleged government repression, poverty and low-level ethnic conflict. Ceasefires between the military government and ethnic groups were also deteriorating.

In the run up to the election, there were several bomb blasts in Myanmar. A bomb attack on Myanmar New Year killed at least nine people in Yangon and injured many others, including the regional commander of the Myanma Army, while a series of explosions were reported at a hydroelectric project being jointly built by a Chinese company in the north of the country, the latter thought to be the work of anti-government groups.

=== International response ===
The United Nations has expressed concern about the fairness of the election and United Nations Secretary-General Ban Ki-moon expressed "grave concern" that Aung San Suu Kyi would not be released before the election and thus it would "lack credibility." He accused the government of being "slow and incomplete" to meet political commitments, and said it was "deeply frustrating" that the government would not hold talks with the "international community."

The Chinese Foreign Ministry spokeswoman, Jiang Yu, commented on the election during Than Shwe's visit to China. "The international community can provide constructive help [for the elections] and refrain from any negative impact on the domestic political process of Myanmar and on regional peace and stability."

The following day, US Secretary of State Hillary Clinton spoke to the US Senate Appropriations Committee Subcommittee on State and Foreign Affairs where she mentioned that the trial against Aung San Suu Kyi was allegedly "baseless charges." She also added that the government was "continuing resistance to a free and open electoral process. If they stay on the track they're on, their elections in 2010 will be totally illegitimate and without any meaning in the international community." She admitted that "We are absolutely committed to trying to come up with an approach that might influence the regime. We are going to try to do our best to influence them to see that this repressive regime is not one that we should continue to support, and hopefully get a greater international base to take action against them." She claimed to have support from other countries, "I have been heartened by the response that we have received. I have spoken to a number of the foreign secretaries of ASEAN countries, who've issued strong statements." She added that she was working to get more support in the United Nations.

UK Foreign Minister William Hague said that "holding flawed elections does not represent change."

=== Monitors ===
Myanmar barred foreign observers and the international media from the election. The election commission chief, Thein Soe, did add, however, that diplomats and representatives from UN organisations in the country would be allowed to observe the election. He justified the decision saying "We are holding the election for this country. It's not for other countries ... We will have credibility after holding the election in front of all the people."

=== Election day ===
The election was held amid tight security. Initial reports pointed to a light turnout across the country, possibly as low as 20% in some areas, and the possibility of irregularities. The Guardian reported that independent local observers were reporting "widespread voter intimidation and bribery" in the election.

== Results ==
On 11 November, state radio announced the results for 147 constituencies in the Lower House, with the USDP winning 133. The USDP won 81 of 86 races newly announced for the Amyotha Hluttaw. The new and previously announced results show the USDP gained majorities in both houses of parliament: 190 out of the 219 (86%) seats announced for the 330-seat lower house, and 95 out of 107 (88%) seats announced for the 168-seat Amyotha Hluttaw.

The Union Solidarity and Development Party (USDP) won 80% of the seats that were up for election. The two largest opposition parties, the National Democratic Front and the Democratic Party conceded defeat; however, along with four other opposition parties, filed formal complaints about fraud with the election commission.

The final results were announced by the Myanmar Union Election Commission on 17 November 2010. Detailed results in English are available.

=== Amyotha Hluttaw ===
168 of the 224 seats in the Amyotha Hluttaw were up for election. The remaining 56 seats (25%) were not elected, and instead reserved for military appointees (taken from Tatmadaw personnel; officially known as "Army Representatives").

Party	Votes	%	Seats
Union Solidarity and Development Party	11,781,920	58.08	129
National Unity Party	4,413,869	21.76	5
National Democratic Force	1,447,560	7.14	4
Shan Nationalities Democratic Party	514,119	2.53	3
Rakhine Nationalities Development Party	303,842	1.50	7
Union of Myanmar Federation of National Politics	232,249	1.14	0
88 Generation Student Youths (Union of Myanmar)	192,179	0.95	0
Democratic Party	182,544	0.90	0
All Mon Region Democracy Party	172,806	0.85	4
National Democratic Party for Development	153,273	0.76	0
Chin Progressive Party	84,562	0.42	4
Phalon-Sawaw Democratic Party	77,825	0.38	3
Inn National Development Party	75,234	0.37	0
Unity and Democracy Party of Kachin State	70,652	0.35	1
Kayin People's Party	69,402	0.34	1
Modern People's Party	55,363	0.27	0
Ta'ang National Party	37,501	0.18	1
Chin National Party	37,450	0.18	2
National Political Alliances	34,676	0.17	0
Kokang Democracy and Unity Party	26,950	0.13	0
Union Democratic Party	26,492	0.13	0
Wa Democratic Party	23,542	0.12	1
Kayan National Party	22,477	0.11	0
Kha Mee National Development Party	21,401	0.11	0
Peace and Diversity Party	20,909	0.10	0
Mro or Khami National Solidarity Organisation	9,995	0.05	0
United Democratic Party	7,018	0.03	0
Rakhine State National United Party	6,551	0.03	0
Ethnic National Development Party	6,005	0.03	0
Peace and Democracy Party	5,728	0.03	0
Kayin State Democracy and Development Party	4,846	0.02	1
National Development and Peace Party	4,136	0.02	0
Kaman National Progressive Party	3,969	0.02	0
Wa National Unity Party	1,703	0.01	0
Independents	157,407	0.78	1
Pa-O National Organisation (Note: Elected unopposed.)			1
Military appointees			56
Total	20,286,155	100.00	224
Valid votes	20,286,155	93.40	
Invalid/blank votes	1,432,387	6.60	
Total votes	21,718,542	100.00	
Registered voters/turnout	28,416,378	76.43	
Source: UEC

==== By constituencies ====
Amyotha Hluttaw results by constituency
Constituency	USDP	NUP	NDF	SNDP	RNDP	UMFNP	88GSY	DP	AMRDP	NDPD	CPP	PSDP	INDP	UDPKS	KPP	MPP	TNP	CNP	NPA	KDUP	UDP	WDP	KNP	KMNDP	PDP	MKNSO	UDP	RSNUP	ENDP	PDP	KSDDP	NDPP	KNPP	WNUP	PNO	Ind	Invalid	Electorate
Kachin No. 1				28,510										52,391																							8,357	137,102
Kachin No. 2	9,864	14,294		9,848																																	2,907	51,715
Kachin No. 3		7,196												5,260																							932	22,573
Kachin No. 4		4,047																																		6,953	1,100	15,502
Kachin No. 5	16,172	8,419		8,550																																	2,281	63,614
Kachin No. 6	15,176	6,437		9,242																																	1,945	54,783
Kachin No. 7	31,549			13,056																																	2,081	72,132
Kachin No. 8	37,606			15,382																																	16,400	109,813
Kachin No. 9	13,880	8,323		4,222																																	5,702	58,897
Kachin No. 10				15,250										13,001																							2,839	45,268
Kachin No. 11	26,474	26,013																																			8,461	72,353
Kachin No. 12	19,553	25,107																																			1,090	47,164
Kayah No. 1	23,249	5,995																																			4,128	34,954
Kayah No. 2	20,852	9,231																																			5,196	36,706
Kayah No. 3	11,662	1,387																					1,656														780	17,656
Kayah No. 4	15,255	1,151																					3,020														1,254	21,190
Kayah No. 5	3,360	1,641																																			71	5,072
Kayah No. 6	4,250	918																																			6	5,174
Kayah No. 7	135	7																																			1	143
Kayah No. 8	1,387	220																																			73	1,680
Kayah No. 9	4,616	421																																			224	5,564
Kayah No. 10	3,353	205																																			153	3,736
Kayah No. 11	3,003	83																																			203	3,564
Kayah No. 12	2,547	291																																			145	3,127
Karen No. 1	20,442	14,125										25,687																									3,765	102,419
Karen No. 2	23,181	12,070										22,052																									4,785	94,362
Karen No. 3	12,031	6,500										16,705																									2,725	52,867
Karen No. 4		3,290										13,381																			4,846						1,070	30,698
Karen No. 5	2,752	775																																			144	4,286
Karen No. 6	2,397	2,197																																			476	10,030
Karen No. 7	7,140														12,374																						1,569	31,992
Karen No. 8	Unopposed																																					
Karen No. 9	15,360	12,957																																			2,496	44,551
Karen No. 10	7,361	5,440							10,913																												1,091	35,432
Karen No. 11	Unopposed																																					
Karen No. 12																															Unopposed							
Chin No. 1	3,848	916									4,785							1,269																			156	12,233
Chin No. 2	4,058	766									5,230																										173	12,250
Chin No. 3	8,072																	12,370									1,347										652	25,693
Chin No. 4	4,650	1,831																10,435																			1,448	23,623
Chin No. 5	6,434	5,147									1,241							4,486																			465	22,356
Chin No. 6	6,104	3,680									1,761							5,646																			506	21,466
Chin No. 7	5,579	1,891									4,696																										342	13,470
Chin No. 8	6,882	3,968				1,179					2,392							2,107																			655	20,137
Chin No. 9	5,261		4,983								6,385																		6,005								884	25,452
Chin No. 10	2,899	1,310									2,715							1,137																			428	10,163
Chin No. 11	3,469		2,111								8,407																4,304										1,868	23,164
Chin No. 12	6,075	1,565	2,546								5,758																1,367										1,708	23,467
Sagaing No. 1	146,934	46,267					26,850																														16,368	347,467
Sagaing No. 2	263,959	66,615																																			19,732	483,197
Sagaing No. 3	212,718	65,925																																			16,224	406,393
Sagaing No. 4	181,381	69,631																																			22,240	409,986
Sagaing No. 5	239,023	42,733	24,674																																		13,785	402,072
Sagaing No. 6	73,344	65,325																																			13,820	215,535
Sagaing No. 7	103,991	68,537																																			20,580	246,399
Sagaing No. 8	102,020	63,003									30,695																										14,108	287,849
Sagaing No. 9	22,247	8,846									10,497																										2,168	56,434
Sagaing No. 10	34,072	35,660																																			4,116	91,135
Sagaing No. 11	31,092	22,485		18,080																																	5,634	116,742
Sagaing No. 12	39,410	8,630																																			669	54,457
Tanintharyi No. 1	11,209	6,886	6,434																																		1,601	35,384
Tanintharyi No. 2	15,858	6,722	7,865																																		1,772	39,697
Tanintharyi No. 3	37,098	18,443																																			2,575	60,942
Tanintharyi No. 4	24,830	16,462																																		943	2,404	59,108
Tanintharyi No. 5	16,829	15,471						10,848																													3,756	54,876
Tanintharyi No. 6	44,032	17,410																																			3,480	77,707
Tanintharyi No. 7	28,943	21,317																																			3,286	71,701
Tanintharyi No. 8	Unopposed																																					
Tanintharyi No. 9	46,541	10,273																																			2,391	61,723
Tanintharyi No. 10	Unopposed																																					
Tanintharyi No. 11	29,125	15,206																																			6,322	75,323
Tanintharyi No. 12	21,133	10,253																																			2,441	36,706
Bago No. 1	88,406	40,084																			26,492																52,200	284,466
Bago No. 2	99,358	54,934																																			10,758	216,749
Bago No. 3	114,022	72,005																																			17,316	264,766
Bago No. 4	107,242	81,520																																			17,689	282,772
Bago No. 5	128,046	53,027	17,431												8,349																						12,750	282,350
Bago No. 6	96,338	68,863																																			4,566	218,583
Bago No. 7	81,058	40,830																																			8,983	167,977
Bago No. 8	136,324	62,500				49,475																															20,153	333,008
Bago No. 9	110,250	44,687				48,389																															17,673	284,618
Bago No. 10	83,288	57,979																																			14,740	206,381
Bago No. 11	92,771	50,953	36,156																																		17,429	250,936
Bago No. 12	97,477	45,604						40,574																													9,342	251,561
Magway No. 1	98,808	11,403	15,968			8,968																															4,146	181,281
Magway No. 2	103,788	30,897	39,433																																		8,557	252,453
Magway No. 3	111,500	39,788	32,833																																		9,428	254,808
Magway No. 4	79,142	27,396	21,801			3,672													2,826																		5,613	173,293
Magway No. 5	132,038	52,737																																			12,641	228,625
Magway No. 6	112,455	64,053																																			15,479	226,330
Magway No. 7	155,693	74,254																																			12,958	259,495
Magway No. 8	139,344	57,391																																			13,208	240,022
Magway No. 9	122,734	56,558				26,781																															12,968	269,423
Magway No. 10	96,855	18,012				17,844																															6,652	166,536
Magway No. 11	162,959	28,059				24,115																															11,425	274,527
Magway No. 12	63,900	28,609	29,343			20,077																															7,225	168,743
Mandalay No. 1	120,418	37,482	82,815					17,623																													15,944	374,211
Mandalay No. 2	136,337	56,089	94,356				26,805	14,008																													17,205	492,664
Mandalay No. 3	237,035	131,225																																			37,660	540,637
Mandalay No. 4	307,722	33,686	58,680																																		10,694	465,040
Mandalay No. 5	221,611	30,573	23,667					16,362																													12,035	410,274
Mandalay No. 6	235,404	43,939																																			11,253	370,485
Mandalay No. 7	70,711	21,820	24,177																																		8,568	168,364
Mandalay No. 8	238,397	34,278	17,905																																		5,058	332,350
Mandalay No. 9	155,561	46,650				19,284																															12,290	282,200
Mandalay No. 10	307,279	31,053				12,465																															10,495	394,437
Mandalay No. 11	177,639	27,102	29,183																																		10,390	286,422
Mandalay No. 12	148,593	41,816	36,906																																		12,677	279,201
Mon No. 1	21,584	10,942							13,954																												2,675	67,460
Mon No. 2	25,326	11,451							11,820																												2,997	62,466
Mon No. 3	20,264	6,620						5,222	17,555																												7,516	118,656
Mon No. 4	18,984	6,935							23,750																												2,821	88,935
Mon No. 5	10,187	7,818							13,439																												4,130	78,629
Mon No. 6	29,018	5,651							26,066																												1,853	116,174
Mon No. 7	15,349	7,034							33,963																												6,500	101,403
Mon No. 8	14,735	16,627																																			3,525	49,222
Mon No. 9	19,702	19,177																																			3,291	61,222
Mon No. 10	24,897	23,533							21,346																												1,327	93,179
Mon No. 11	27,302	21,321													1,927																						3,982	84,520
Mon No. 12	25,600	23,552																																			5,274	90,083
Rakhine No. 1	21,757	2,896			40,164					24,583																							3,969				11,117	119,454
Rakhine No. 2	16,350	7,657			45,002																			6,769				2,757									6,582	99,106
Rakhine No. 3	12,757	9,718			41,057					14,978																9,995		3,794									2,987	105,145
Rakhine No. 4	16,742	8,999			29,806																																7,612	70,332
Rakhine No. 5	22,282	10,458			44,736																																10,704	112,859
Rakhine No. 6	26,661	14,149			57,405																			3,710													5,401	131,245
Rakhine No. 7	72,177	2,079								38,699																											981	128,187
Rakhine No. 8	64,564									30,887																						1,396					15,350	129,195
Rakhine No. 9	48,120									44,126														10,922								2,740				25,640	17,342	154,703
Rakhine No. 10	24,639	13,653			28,648																																3,068	107,197
Rakhine No. 11	62,610	7,752			17,024																																5,180	115,400
Rakhine No. 12	54,067	43,894																																			10,922	170,261
Yangon No. 1	106,074	30,406	114,548																											5,728						12,278	16,169	426,890
Yangon No. 2	122,086	37,329	90,333				27,265																														18,425	438,638
Yangon No. 3	86,713	17,906	92,338					11,535																													12,902	325,531
Yangon No. 4	78,714	20,344	83,558					27,354																													11,080	360,527
Yangon No. 5	81,950	23,709	69,407				24,683																														8,225	313,358
Yangon No. 6	70,317	18,087	77,541				17,815																													7,313	12,401	315,478
Yangon No. 7	106,069	32,678	27,592																																		7,663	221,768
Yangon No. 8	137,628	38,669	85,689																																		15,683	377,620
Yangon No. 9	173,208	38,830													15,461	7,332																					11,787	298,298
Yangon No. 10	116,682	51,903						39,018											17,448						8,532												13,380	366,909
Yangon No. 11	146,234	60,025	61,101				68,761																														22,303	567,584
Yangon No. 12	213,443	71,805	44,590																																		15,803	427,894
Shan No. 1	244,251	103,959											75,234										17,801														28,139	568,569
Shan No. 2	73,586	15,897		94,071																																	16,846	320,691
Shan No. 3	81,105	14,270		68,120																26,950																	16,088	299,617
Shan No. 4	89,318	41,252		123,458																																	15,695	370,216
Shan No. 5	65,720	15,361		47,876													37,501																				15,549	247,688
Shan No. 6	55,188	3,224	5,842	17,230																																	2,580	139,302
Shan No. 7	79,494	14,814		41,224																																	13,486	192,146
Shan No. 8	32,276	11,924																																		30,221	6,109	92,318
Shan No. 9																																			Unopposed			
Shan No. 10																	Unopposed																					
Shan No. 11	Unopposed																																					
Shan No. 12																						23,542												1,703			861	29,519
Ayeyarwady No. 1	123,033	54,113	44,845																																		17,161	302,035
Ayeyarwady No. 2	124,100	83,801													31,291																						18,448	303,551
Ayeyarwady No. 3	134,610	83,376																																			15,810	286,550
Ayeyarwady No. 4	210,604	56,933																																			25,264	337,273
Ayeyarwady No. 5	147,403	32,541																																			9,121	208,467
Ayeyarwady No. 6	105,647	51,289																																			19,108	213,055
Ayeyarwady No. 7	197,835	125,397	40,909																																		27,907	477,437
Ayeyarwady No. 8	175,721	65,350														18,505																					25,282	332,602
Ayeyarwady No. 9	119,260	94,505																																			11,421	281,182
Ayeyarwady No. 10	156,485	45,827														17,632																					20,714	332,298
Ayeyarwady No. 11	141,047	60,363														11,894			14,402						12,377												20,005	328,980
Ayeyarwady No. 12	176,215	116,296																																		74,059	36,460	500,940

=== Pyithu Hluttaw ===
325 of the 440 seats in the Pyithu Hluttaw were up for election after 5 seats in Shan State were cancelled. The remaining 110 seats (25%) were not elected, and instead reserved for military appointees (taken from Tatmadaw personnel; officially known as "Army Representatives").

Party	Votes	%	Seats
Union Solidarity and Development Party	11,882,087	58.40	259
National Unity Party	4,085,174	20.08	12
National Democratic Force	1,476,825	7.26	8
Shan Nationalities Democratic Party	508,780	2.50	18
Rakhine Nationalities Development Party	331,308	1.63	9
Union of Myanmar Federation of National Politics	262,271	1.29	0
88 Generation Student Youths (Union of Myanmar)	256,733	1.26	0
All Mon Region Democracy Party	181,285	0.89	3
Democratic Party	166,934	0.82	0
National Democratic Party for Development	153,641	0.76	0
National Political Alliances Party	90,221	0.44	0
Phalon-Sawaw Democratic Party	82,033	0.40	2
Chin Progressive Party	76,463	0.38	2
Kayin People's Party	67,764	0.33	1
Inn National Development Party	52,195	0.26	1
Ta'ang National Party	46,652	0.23	1
Chin National Party	39,814	0.20	2
Modern People's Party	38,737	0.19	0
United Democratic Party	37,005	0.18	0
Wa Democratic Party	27,546	0.14	2
Peace and Democracy Party	26,873	0.13	0
Kokang Democracy and Unity Party	25,731	0.13	0
Kayan National Party	17,935	0.09	0
Peace and Diversity Party	12,817	0.06	0
Unity and Democracy Party of Kachin State	11,170	0.05	1
Wuntharnu NLD (Union of Myanmar)	10,055	0.05	0
Lahu National Development Party	9,565	0.05	0
Rakhine State National Force of Myanmar	9,281	0.05	0
Kaman National Progressive Party	7,742	0.04	0
Democratic Party for a New Society	7,672	0.04	0
Wa National Unity Party	4,940	0.02	0
Mro or Khami National Solidarity Organisation	4,292	0.02	0
Independents	335,753	1.65	1
Pa-O National Organisation			3
Cancelled			5
Military appointees			110
Total	20,347,294	100.00	440
Valid votes	20,347,294	92.90	
Invalid/blank votes	1,555,962	7.10	
Total votes	21,903,256	100.00	
Source: UEC

==== By constituencies ====
Pyithu Hluttaw results by constituency
State/Region	Constituency	USDP	NUP	NDF	SNDP	RNDP	UMFNP	88GSY	AMRDP	DP	NDPD	NPAP	PSDP	CPP	KPP	INDP	TNP	CNP	MPP	UDP	WDP	PDP	KDUP	KNP	PDP	UDPKS	WNLD	LNDP	RSNFM	KNPP	DPNS	WNUP	MKNSO	PNO	Ind	Invalid
Kachin State	1 - Myitkyina	41,920	16,498	14,585	8,610																															7,470
Kachin State	2 - Waingmaw		12,652		10,636																					10,663										2,962
Kachin State	3 - Tanai	7,260	4,734																																569	1,007
Kachin State	4 - Chipwi	4,957	3,181																																	658
Kachin State	5 - Tsawlaw	1,083	1,037																																	221
Kachin State	6 - Injangyang		350																							507										112
Kachin State	7 - Mohnyin	34,422	13,329		16,156																															4,696
Kachin State	8 - Mogaung	29,080	5,838		9,648																															2,459
Kachin State	9 - Hpakant	29,426		21,633	5,983																															13,255
Kachin State	10 - Bhamo	23,883	17,565		7,777																															6,582
Kachin State	11 - Momauk	10,551	7,113		10,715																															2,720
Kachin State	12 - Mansi	7,595	6,159		4,593																															2,774
Kachin State	13 - Shwegu	18,631	16,624																																	4,903
Kachin State	14 - Puta-O	20,284	5,671		1,538																															782
Kachin State	15 - Machanbaw	2,066	2,512																																	257
Kachin State	16 - Nawngmun	3,153	630																																	55
Kachin State	17 - Sumprabum	1,233	858																																	180
Kachin State	18 - Khaunglanhpu	3,308	3,177																																	88
Kayah State	19 - Loikaw	42,893	15,179																																	10,579
Kayah State	20 - Demoso	26,869	2,873																					5,192												1,231
Kayah State	21 - Hpruso	7,617	2,536																																	92
Kayah State	22 - Shadaw	1,563	184																																	74
Kayah State	23 - Bawlakhe	4,524	449																																	288
Kayah State	24 - Hpasawng	6,432	249																																	319
Kayah State	25 - Mese	2,603	244																																	136
Karen State	26 - Hpa-An	45,197	27,654										45,334																							9,060
Karen State	27 - Hlaingbwe	17,955	8,051										30,540																							4,028
Karen State	28 - Hpapun	5,185	2,959																																	608
Karen State	29 - Thandaunggyi	7,923											1,615		10,033																					1,439
Karen State	30 - Myawaddy	Unopposed																																		
Karen State	31 - Kawkareik	23,224	15,749						13,357																											5,049
Karen State	32 - Kyainseikgyi	8,673	3,372																																	1,066
Chin State	33 - Falam	7,122	1,015											8,975				3,716																		389
Chin State	34 - Hakha	4,807	1,501															10,400																		1,648
Chin State	35 - Thantlang	8,295	1,476															12,075																		605
Chin State	36 - Tedim	12,446	9,192											2,292				10,320																		1,223
Chin State	37 - Tonzang	6,948	5,055																																	512
Chin State	38 - Mindat	6,877	4,074				1,056							2,420				2,029																		712
Chin State	39 - Matupi	8,436		6,198										7,910																						973
Chin State	40 - Kanpetlet	3,288	1,130											2,360				1,274																		441
Chin State	41 - Paletwa	6,129	2,345	4,650										12,629						5,644													4,292			3,489
Sagaing Region	42 - Sagaing	91,015	18,940					14,491																												10,638
Sagaing Region	43 - Myinmu	22,639	13,026					5,128																												3,686
Sagaing Region	44 - Myaung	39,621	9,851					5,790																												2,396
Sagaing Region	45 - Shwebo	88,332	24,697																																	7,652
Sagaing Region	46 - Khin-U	60,546	12,766																																	3,416
Sagaing Region	47 - Wetlet	83,252	11,374																																	4,002
Sagaing Region	48 - Kanbalu	101,223	18,349																																	6,801
Sagaing Region	49 - Kyunhla	27,510	14,319																																	3,221
Sagaing Region	50 - Ye-U	36,373	15,366																																	4,214
Sagaing Region	51 - Tabayin	30,983	13,179																	4,221																5,840
Sagaing Region	52 - Taze	50,966	10,201																																2,110	4,476
Sagaing Region	53 - Monywa	75,718	23,057	22,094			3,821															1,923														12,801
Sagaing Region	54 - Budalin	43,847	13,498																																	4,040
Sagaing Region	55 - Ayadaw	51,967	16,141																																	5,638
Sagaing Region	56 - Chaung-U	28,343	5,662	10,337																																2,769
Sagaing Region	57 - Yinmabin	41,431	17,126																																	5,906
Sagaing Region	58 - Kani	64,535	5,217																																	1,683
Sagaing Region	59 - Salingyi	43,724	16,058																																	2,507
Sagaing Region	60 - Pale	68,071	4,350																																	2,922
Sagaing Region	61 - Katha	29,774	22,002																																2,250; 1,265	5,615
Sagaing Region	62 - Indaw	21,171	19,806																																	5,708
Sagaing Region	63 - Tigyaing	22,485	19,480																																	3,279
Sagaing Region	64 - Banmauk	17,238	10,771		6,862																															5,411
Sagaing Region	65 - Kawlin	27,184	12,190	25,011																																4,314
Sagaing Region	66 - Wuntho	23,055	8,957																																	2,532
Sagaing Region	67 - Pinlebu	25,634	19,659																																	5,308
Sagaing Region	68 - Kale	49,575	32,629											29,712																						11,572
Sagaing Region	69 - Kalewa	12,972	14,741																																	1,324
Sagaing Region	70 - Mingin	42,717	12,328																																	1,839
Sagaing Region	71 - Tamu	23,424	7,767											10,165																						2,418
Sagaing Region	72 - Mawlaik	11,032	11,562																																	1,748
Sagaing Region	73 - Paungbyin	22,870	23,473																																	2,817
Sagaing Region	74 - Hkamti	9,037	2,376																																	741
Sagaing Region	75 - Homalin	23,132	19,762		17,168																															5,374
Sagaing Region	76 - Lay Shi	5,827	1,163																																	160
Sagaing Region	77 - Lahe	Unopposed																																		
Sagaing Region	78 - Nanyun	12,189	7,445																																	376
Tanintharyi Region	79 - Dawei	28,119	11,819	14,531																																3,931
Tanintharyi Region	80 - Launglon	37,620	17,819																																	2,591
Tanintharyi Region	81 - Thayetchaung	26,970	14,977																																	2,682
Tanintharyi Region	82 - Yebyu	17,452	14,388	11,096																																5,193
Tanintharyi Region	83 - Myeik	74,843	36,729																																	7,187
Tanintharyi Region	84 - Kyunsu	Unopposed																																		
Tanintharyi Region	85 - Palaw	47,299	9,627																																	2,370
Tanintharyi Region	86 - Tanintharyi	20,482	19,101																																	2,345
Tanintharyi Region	87 - Kawthoung	29,350	14,491																																	6,575
Tanintharyi Region	88 - Bokepyin	20,746	10,281																																	2,800
Bago Region	89 - Bago	88,265	36,906	30,966																																51,045
Bago Region	90 - Thanatpin	31,879	17,757	6,016																																5,827
Bago Region	91 - Kawa	62,199	27,278	9,665																																5,098
Bago Region	92 - Waw	43,562	17,833	11,380																																7,692
Bago Region	93 - Nyaunglebin	42,956	23,113	8,352																															2,380	4,692
Bago Region	94 - Kyauktaga	58,089	43,013	11,381																																18,475
Bago Region	95 - Daik-U	44,773	23,462	8,835																																7,685
Bago Region	96 - Shwegyin	15,091	17,745	2,394																																2,916
Bago Region	97 - Taungoo	85,932	35,509																																	6,712
Bago Region	98 - Yedashe	54,180	30,352	8,554																																6,596
Bago Region	99 - Kyaukkyi	13,706	28,467																																	2,339
Bago Region	100 - Phyu	83,536	27,842																			6,482														7,087
Bago Region	104 - Oktwin	48,792	19,267																			3,379														5,736
Bago Region	105 - Htantabin	28,022	16,260												6,342																					1,582
Bago Region	103 - Pyay	60,405	28,086				21,985																													10,682
Bago Region	104 - Paukkaung	25,742	20,981				8,212																													5,029
Bago Region	105 - Padaung	51,116	13,654				16,397																													5,474
Bago Region	106 - Paungde	41,869	17,676				13,761																													6,738
Bago Region	107 - Thegon	31,504	15,184				18,580																													6,456
Bago Region	108 - Shwedaung	34,980	10,927				17,943																													5,201
Bago Region	109 - Thayarwady	42,471	26,082																																	3,151
Bago Region	110 - Letpadan	35,915	19,356				4,715																												12,704	8,526
Bago Region	111 - Minhla	31,875	12,110	9,507																																8,430
Bago Region	112 - Okpho	36,970	12,936	11,368																																5,991
Bago Region	113 - Zigon	22,347	6,420							9,305																										1,831
Bago Region	114 - Nattalin	57,455	26,445																																	5,636
Bago Region	115 - Monyo	24,861	13,856					8,148																											17,936	3,725
Bago Region	116 - Gyobingauk	27,204	13,285							19,189																										4,091
Magway Region	117 - Magway	106,900	21,694	16,258			10,368																													4,832
Magway Region	118 - Yenangyaung	45,057	11,513	14,590				903																												3,263
Magway Region	119 - Chauk	59,081	18,885	23,080																																8,531
Magway Region	120 - Taungdwingyi	76,893	31,699	17,490			4,449																													6,976
Magway Region	121 - Myothit	46,986	14,812	12,695			3,619																													2,559
Magway Region	122 - Natmauk	63,118	25,099	16,873																																7,970
Magway Region	123 - Minbu	63,350	23,226	8,524																																6,988
Magway Region	124 - Pwintbyu	62,500	21,327				5,618																													4,711
Magway Region	125 - Salin	57,350	26,551									40,072																								8,658
Magway Region	126 - Ngape	18,804	11,302																																	950
Magway Region	127 - Sidoktaya	18,846	8,270																																	1,328
Magway Region	128 - Thayet	50,849	14,578																	2,668																2,248
Magway Region	129 - Kamma	28,522	5,792	14,062																																1,617
Magway Region	130 - Mindon	25,873	9,246	5,535																																1,902
Magway Region	131 - Minhla	44,762	31,687																																	3,586
Magway Region	132 - Sinbaungwe	50,825	18,907																																	2,357
Magway Region	133 - Aunglan	83,212	23,555					23,319																												7,840
Magway Region	134 - Pakokku	105,587	26,817				19,120																													11,421
Magway Region	135 - Yesagyo	101,146	13,868				16,830																													5,878
Magway Region	136 - Myaing	109,173	8,260				8,942																													6,241
Magway Region	137 - Pauk	57,246	15,558				15,114																													5,499
Magway Region	138 - Seikphyu	24,534	29,777																																	2,568
Magway Region	139 - Gangaw	32,116	10,590	23,051			2,677																													3,450
Magway Region	140 - Tilin	14,545	6,886				9,025																													1,527
Magway Region	141 - Saw	19,894	11,510				11,524																													2,312
Mandalay Region/Naypyidaw	142 - Aungmyethazan	41,697	10,761	35,486																							3,697									6,514
Mandalay Region/Naypyidaw	143 - Chanayethazan	30,591	6,558	29,287																															6,657	5,509
Mandalay Region/Naypyidaw	144 - Mahaaungmyay	30,636	9,551	24,868				4,943																							7,672					7,156
Mandalay Region/Naypyidaw	145 - Chanmyathazi	32,381	17,516	25,672				11,823																												3,115
Mandalay Region/Naypyidaw	146 - Pyigyidagun	28,392	10,203	13,226				5,791																			2,179									5,636
Mandalay Region/Naypyidaw	147 - Amarapura	50,180	19,875	30,969																																8,287
Mandalay Region/Naypyidaw	148 - Patheingyi	49,301	17,854	18,552				1,976		1,940																	3,761									5,461
Mandalay Region/Naypyidaw	149 - Pyinoolwin	77,441	34,626																																	13,449
Mandalay Region/Naypyidaw	150 - Madaya	55,167	27,701	18,614																																11,270
Mandalay Region/Naypyidaw	151 - Singu	34,813	13,893	7,445																																4,800
Mandalay Region/Naypyidaw	152 - Mogok	27,289	7,057	17,055																																7,335
Mandalay Region/Naypyidaw	153 - Thabeikkyin	31,079	12,148	6,033																																3,027
Mandalay Region/Naypyidaw	154 - Kyaukse	116,178	7,972	14,170																																0
Mandalay Region/Naypyidaw	155 - Sintgaing	52,209	9,731	13,102																																5,187
Mandalay Region/Naypyidaw	156 - Myittha	80,183	6,820	12,844						6,851																										0
Mandalay Region/Naypyidaw	157 - Tada-U	69,074	3,180	8,752																1,750																2,823
Mandalay Region/Naypyidaw	158 - Myingyan	92,103	11,360	16,599			9,759																													8,018
Mandalay Region/Naypyidaw	159 - Taungtha	122,171	6,204	3,106																																5,308
Mandalay Region/Naypyidaw	160 - Natogyi	98,423	7,920																																	4,329
Mandalay Region/Naypyidaw	161 - Kyaukpadaung	113,697	34,781																																	4,186
Mandalay Region/Naypyidaw	162 - Ngazun	42,866	16,158																																	4,031
Mandalay Region/Naypyidaw	163 - Nyaung-U	70,486	21,917	23,508																																9,351
Mandalay Region/Naypyidaw	164 - Yamethin	109,599	18,562	9,980																																8,248
Mandalay Region/Naypyidaw	165 - Pyawbwe	133,029	19,382																																	3,850
Mandalay Region/Naypyidaw	166 - Zeyathiri	60,503	2,253																																	897
Mandalay Region/Naypyidaw	167 - Pobbathiri	44,305	4,615																																	2,434
Mandalay Region/Naypyidaw	168 - Ottarathiri	26,885	6,734																																	1,581
Mandalay Region/Naypyidaw	169 - Zabuthiri	65,620	6,257																																	3,640
Mandalay Region/Naypyidaw	170 - Dekkhinathiri	13,398	1,466																																	479
Mandalay Region/Naypyidaw	171 - Pyinmana	73,021	11,707									9,769																								4,368
Mandalay Region/Naypyidaw	172 - Tatkon	106,803	6,717																																4,416	2,670
Mandalay Region/Naypyidaw	173 - Lewe	86,129	27,654																																11,926	9,145
Mandalay Region/Naypyidaw	174 - Meiktila	117,152	23,284									13,242																								4,895
Mandalay Region/Naypyidaw	175 - Mahlaing	61,878	4,057	6,517																															8,472	5,376
Mandalay Region/Naypyidaw	176 - Thazi	69,936	12,305	18,483																																6,270
Mandalay Region/Naypyidaw	177 - Wundwin	74,288	29,210	16,251																																14,817
Mon State	178 - Mawlamyine	47,141	22,604						25,938																											4,285
Mon State	179 - Kyaikmaraw	18,922	4,767						17,199	4,715			4,425																							8,209
Mon State	180 - Chaungzon	20,039	6,274						23,183																											3,065
Mon State	181 - Thanbyuzayat	11,585	5,623						11,789																										2,562	4,353
Mon State	182 - Mudon	29,900	4,173	3,726					24,867																											7,124
Mon State	183 - Ye	15,983	5,494						34,605																											7,243
Mon State	184 - Thaton	35,253	34,877																																	7,651
Mon State	185 - Paung		35,961						30,347																											11,676
Mon State	186 - Kyaikto	26,877	23,035																																	4,708
Mon State	187 - Bilin	26,771	22,492																																	539
Rakhine State	188 - Sittwe	20,168	2,483			40,023					14,916																			2,621					11,839	12,808
Rakhine State	189 - Ponnagyun	10,514	7,475			27,698																							2,398							6,485
Rakhine State	190 - Mrauk-U	21,139	9,556			47,223																														7,587
Rakhine State	191 - Kyauktaw	22,288	4,037			44,104					14,967																									10,123
Rakhine State	192 - Minbya	15,817	8,352			30,772																														8,218
Rakhine State	193 - Myebon	10,005	4,367			15,187																														10,264
Rakhine State	194 - Pauktaw	11,551	5,883			30,550																														14,388
Rakhine State	195 - Rathedaung	16,618	6,092			29,794																														11,854
Rakhine State	196 - Maungdaw	137,691	5,114								68,523																									22,543
Rakhine State	197 - Buthidaung	51,985				15,564					47,802																								14,558	18,031
Rakhine State	198 - Kyaukpyu	14,626	5,103			22,975																														7,723
Rakhine State	199 - Munaung	6,320	4,502							3,606																									6,160; 3,640	3,878
Rakhine State	200 - Ramree	20,165				17,133																														4,535
Rakhine State	201 - Ann	44,313	5,735																																	2,011
Rakhine State	202 - Thandwe	16,233	8,095			10,285																							6,883	5,121						6,637
Rakhine State	203 - Toungup	19,723	10,814																																	6,185
Rakhine State	204 - Gwa	13,219	11,183																																	3,122
Yangon Region	205 - Insein	57,195	17,789					19,500		22,099												4,743														8,180
Yangon Region	206 - Mingaladon	74,170	25,739									15,612													6,292											4,806
Yangon Region	207 - Hmawbi	65,278	14,558							11,151					5,069																					3,927
Yangon Region	208 - Hlegu	81,625	10,234	13,815																																7,687
Yangon Region	209 - Taikkyi	65,640	36,224	12,054																															15,503	7,435
Yangon Region	210 - Htantabin	37,238	10,775	8,417				4,908																												3,666
Yangon Region	211 - Shwepyithar	47,871	13,606					16,374		27,497																									2,745	7,948
Yangon Region	212 - Hlaingtharya	54,841	34,558					44,317											1,830	7,561															18,606; 3,136; 2,561	11,631
Yangon Region	213 - Thingangyun	37,370	6,639	48,603																		2,817														5,865
Yangon Region	214 - Yankin	13,587	4,269	13,176																																5,348
Yangon Region	215 - South Okkalapa	43,334	4,521	24,529						3,664																									6,585	5,677
Yangon Region	216 - North Okkalapa	45,584	10,318	53,396				5,819																											18,739	2,337
Yangon Region	217 - Thaketa	42,471	11,459	39,618				14,572																												7,307
Yangon Region	218 - Dawbon	14,739	6,697	12,147						1,430																										1,700
Yangon Region	219 - Tamwe	23,032	7,795					20,424												15,161		3,747													4,966	9
Yangon Region	220 - Pazundaung	7,245	1,131	7,335																															2,565	1,278
Yangon Region	221 - Botataung	10,902		8,081																															1,086	1,094
Yangon Region	222 - Mingala Taungnyunt	28,566	4,292							20,257	5,442																								1,717	3,409
Yangon Region	223 - Dagon Myothit (North)	32,736	7,883	34,800				4,352		4,575																										5,300
Yangon Region	224 - Dagon Myothit (East)	27,307	9,252	20,653																																2,649
Yangon Region	225 - Dagon Myothit (South)	61,875	14,346	46,828						9,600																										8,342
Yangon Region	226- Dagon Myothit (Seikkan)	20,119	7,554					8,742																												3,086
Yangon Region	227 - Thanlyin	59,921	15,421	29,051						4,220																										5,494
Yangon Region	228 - Kyauktan	31,738	11,366	30,996																																6,585
Yangon Region	229 - Thongwa	45,277	16,460	15,533																																4,197
Yangon Region	230 - Kayan	63,979	12,509	9,388																															560	4,185
Yangon Region	231 - Twante	74,589	13,483	3,797											9,802																					6,666
Yangon Region	232 - Kungyangon	57,731	5,304	3,639																																1,825
Yangon Region	233 - Kawhmu	42,176	13,944	4,757															1,638																	3,215
Yangon Region	234 - Dala	33,460	5,866	11,033				7,053		3,522																									2,575	4,565
Yangon Region	235 - Seikkyi Kanaungto	8,701	942	4,283																																729
Yangon Region	236 - Cocokyun	653		122																																6
Yangon Region	237 - Kyauktada	4,668	1,235	4,065				864		1,108			119														418									850
Yangon Region	238 - Latha	3,487	1,309	5,289																																726
Yangon Region	239 - Pabedan	5,447	794	4,261							1,991											258													1,562	848
Yangon Region	240 - Ahlone	8,899	1,949	13,683				1,360				805																								1,146
Yangon Region	241 - Lanmadaw	4,333	1,578	6,830				747		1,145																									335; 254	1,107
Yangon Region	242 - Kyimyindaing	19,225	4,280	14,920				6,182																	966											2,941
Yangon Region	243 - Sanchaung	12,286	2,938	13,713				2,939		5,162																										1,944
Yangon Region	244 - Kamayut	9,143	2,240	8,971				1,525		846																									6,237	2,097
Yangon Region	245 - Hlaing	24,238	4,993	17,921				5,255																											8,270; 2,167	4,383
Yangon Region	246 - Mayangone	41,183	8,925	23,305				9,488														3,524														2,436
Yangon Region	247 - Bahan	15,769	3,099	14,786						5,052																										2,069
Yangon Region	248 - Dagon	6,608	1,128	3,473																																443
Yangon Region	249 - Seikkan	1,024	97	392																																63
Shan State	250 - Taunggyi	76,983	31,415		23,165																														33,338	11,280
Shan State	251 - Hopong																																	Unopposed		
Shan State	252 - Nyaungshwe	30,048	7,239													52,195																				5,471
Shan State	253 - Hsi Hseng																																	Unopposed		
Shan State	254 - Kalaw	52,543	27,848																																	4,472
Shan State	255 - Pindaya	26,459	10,901																																	2,998
Shan State	256 - Ywangan	9,502	2,624																																23,922	4,212
Shan State	257 - Lawksawk	46,821	15,545																																	5,541
Shan State	258 - Pinlaung																																	Unopposed		
Shan State	259 - Pekon	15,028	7,826																					12,743												3,087
Shan State	260 - Loilem	18,039	6,743		11,481																															3,080
Shan State	261 - Nansang	14,570	4,535		11,591																															2,087
Shan State	262 - Kunhing	5,665			8,255																															473
Shan State	263 - Lai Hka	2,637	1,389		9,774																															1,313
Shan State	264 - Mong Kung	2,166			7,358																															1,482
Shan State	265 - Kyethi	4,152			12,992																															81
Shan State	266 - Monghsu	8,576			7,567																															2,211
Shan State	267 - Langhko	6,966			9,406																															1,787
Shan State	268 - Mong Nai	4,257			8,349																															688
Shan State	269 - Mawkmai	5,181			4,422																															480
Shan State	270 - Mong pan	3,319			3,929																															272
Shan State	271 - Lashio	43,295	7,711		29,002																		15,579													7,508
Shan State	272 - Hsenwi	10,377	1,301		10,457																		2,569													3,409
Shan State	273 - Tangyan	11,352	1,955		13,424																1,661							2,551				1,946				4,734
Shan State	274 - Panghsang	Election not held																																		
Shan State	275 - Namphan	Election not held																																		
Shan State	276 - Pangwaun	Election not held																																		
Shan State	277 - Mongmao	Election not held																																		
Shan State	278 - Mongyai	5,103			9,713																															1,600
Shan State	279 - Kyaukme	20,588			37,010												15,126																			5,015
Shan State	280 - Hsipaw	18,206	3,371		36,998																															4,285
Shan State	281 - Nawnghkio	20,710	22,701		14,947																															2,672
Shan State	282 - Namtu	8,405			10,488																															2,052
Shan State	283 - Mongmit		13,865		12,920																															1,965
Shan State	284 - Mabein	8,374	5,384		5,176																															1,097
Shan State	285 - Namhsan	Unopposed																																		
Shan State	286 - Manton																Unopposed																			
Shan State	287 - Kunlong	9,675																			3,676		7,583													1,193
Shan State	288 - Hopang																				17,582											294				0
Shan State	289 - Muse	18,648	8,612		22,380																															6,430
Shan State	290 - Namhkan	11,508	979		21,350												15,462																			3,442
Shan State	291 - Kutkai	39,976	6,329		4,090												16,064																			6,322
Shan State	292 - Laukkaing	Unopposed																																		
Shan State	293 - Konkyan	Unopposed																																		
Shan State	294 - Kengtung	46,057	1,739	5,758	14,109																											2,700				1,199
Shan State	295 - Mongla	Election not held																																		
Shan State	296 - Mongkhet	4,713	283	226	1,161																															1,003
Shan State	297 - Mongyang	2,697	146	136	940																															113
Shan State	298 - Matman																				4,627							3,373								230
Shan State	299 - Monghsat	16,853	883		2,433																															395
Shan State	300 - Mongping	15,397	565		6,400																							3,641								886
Shan State	301 - Mongton	8,716	284		3,225																															1,384
Shan State	302 - Tachileik		20,756		22,255																															14,639
Shan State	303 - Monghpyak	7,405	484	230	2,918																															1,542
Shan State	304 - Mongyawng	5,413	1,804		9,409																															1,931
Ayeyarwady Region	305 - Pathein	90,676	34,558	32,652																																11,566
Ayeyarwady Region	306 - Kangyidaunt	46,115	33,085																																	9,296
Ayeyarwady Region	307 - Thabaung	42,217	22,774	11,027																																6,450
Ayeyarwady Region	308 - Ngapudaw	26,397	12,659	8,921											13,544																					5,889
Ayeyarwady Region	309 - Kyonpyaw	71,994	31,064	18,247																																8,982
Ayeyarwady Region	310 - Yegyi	53,864	37,823	5,480																																6,813
Ayeyarwady Region	311 - Kyaunggon	50,392	31,555																																	7,043
Ayeyarwady Region	312 - Hinthada	142,704	33,284																																	18,844
Ayeyarwady Region	313 - Zalun	77,908	14,555																																	3,991
Ayeyarwady Region	314 - Lemyethna	34,288	1,067																																21,916	3,436
Ayeyarwady Region	315 - Myanaung	81,996	24,501																																	13,569
Ayeyarwady Region	316 - Kyangin	25,184	24,617																																	6,621
Ayeyarwady Region	317 - Ingapu	107,348	17,013																																	4,076
Ayeyarwady Region	318 - Myaungmya	74,865	14,404	18,469			3,899								18,309																					10,933
Ayeyarwady Region	319 - Einme	54,641	43,888																																	8,647
Ayeyarwady Region	320 - Wakema	74,046	60,548																																	12,144
Ayeyarwady Region	321 - Labutta	96,951	63,245				10,124																												41,527	13,806
Ayeyarwady Region	322 - Mawlamyinegyun	97,692	36,712				19,856																													22,255
Ayeyarwady Region	323 - Maubin	123,824	22,514				4,877												5,089																	13,385
Ayeyarwady Region	324 - Pantanaw	57,054	61,992																																	1,507
Ayeyarwady Region	325 - Nyaungdon	50,054	39,919																10,623																	0
Ayeyarwady Region	326 - Danubyu	67,142	27,781																																	7,491
Ayeyarwady Region	327 - Pyapon	97,669	34,101																																	8,997
Ayeyarwady Region	328 - Bogale	80,972	37,900	13,063															4,814						5,559											15,711
Ayeyarwady Region	329 - Kyaiklat	56,749	14,636									10,721			4,665				5,382																5,437	5,313
Ayeyarwady Region	330 - Dedaye	62,940	27,237																9,361																	11,613

== Reactions ==
Than Nyein, the chairman of the National Democratic Force, claimed the election was marred by irregularities. "We have our evidence. Some candidates complained ... because there was vote cheating." Khin Maung Swe, the leader of the opposition National Democratic Force alleged: "We took the lead at the beginning but the USDP later came up with so-called advance votes and that changed the results completely, so we lost."

UN Secretary-General Ban Ki-moon claimed voting conditions had been "insufficiently inclusive, participatory and transparent."

The People's Republic of China's Foreign Ministry said the election was "a critical step for Myanmar in implementing the seven-step road map in the transition to an elected government, and thus is welcome."

India was conspicuously silent with segments of the Indian media questioning whether principle gave way to expediency.

Russian Foreign Minister Sergey Lavrov welcomed the vote and characterised it as a "step forward in the democratisation of Burmese society."

During a speech to the Indian parliament, US President Barack Obama said of the election that "When peaceful democratic movements are suppressed – as in Burma – then the democracies of the world cannot remain silent ... It is unacceptable to steal an election as the regime in Burma has done again for the world to see."

Edwin Lacierda, the spokesperson of Philippine president Benigno Aquino III, said in a press conference in Malacañang Palace that " [We] express our disappointment towards the actions done by the Burmese government towards the NLD, and also with regards to such a farce-like elections which just appeared to be a display."

== Analysis ==
At the time of the election Aljazeera argued that the election marginalised Aung San Suu Kyi. It asked "How much power and reach would she still have to rally her followers barely a week after the south-east Asian nation's first general election in two decades?" One such reason was because the NLD's boycott may have failed if it does not play the right cards in dealing with at least a semblance of an elected opposition in a "semi-legitimate" parliament. Pending her release from jail, the political atmosphere would have changed because of a new military leadership that may not be as "cosmopolitan" and "practical" in dealing both with her and external players. The British ambassador to Myanmar, Andrew Heyn, also said: "What they the junta do when Suu Kyi is released will send a message. She is well informed and committed and wants to stay involved."

== Aftermath ==
The following day clashes erupted between the Democratic Karen Buddhist Army (DKBA) and government forces in Myawaddy by the Thai border. The fighting spilled over to the town of Three Pagodas Pass with reports that the DKBA had seized the town from the military. According to some reports, the DKBA planned the action in the towns of Myawaddy and Three Pagodas Pass to take advantage of the deployment of the military for election monitoring. Many voters in the area, fearing an attack, stayed away from the polls.

Opposition leader Aung San Suu Kyi was released from house arrest on 13 November, despite a court ruling quashing her release. She then said there were no regrets over her party's boycott of the election. To have change, she said, "The people have to want it, and they have to be united."

Suu Kyi and her party participated and won seats in the subsequent 2012 by-elections. The next Myanmar general election was held in 2015.

=== Changes during the term of office ===
On 9 September 2011 Tun Aung Khaing (USDP) replaced Aung Kyaw Zan (RNDP) who had been removed from office.
