= Kwe Te No =

Burmese politician

- ကြီတီးႏို

Member of the Chin State Hluttaw
- Constituency: Hpasawng Township No.1

Personal details
- Born: 29 October 1959 (age 66) Chin State, Myanmar
- Party: National League for Democracy
- Education: B.A, BEd
- Occupation: Politician

Kwe Te No (Burmese: ကြီတီးႏို) is a Burmese politician who currently serves as a Chin State Hluttaw MP for Hpasawng Township No.1. He is a member of the National League for Democracy.

== Political career ==
He is a member of the National League for Democracy. In the 2020 Myanmar general election, he was elected as an Chin State Hluttaw MP, and elected representative from Hpasawng Township No.1parliamentary constituency.
