= Htay Oo (politician) =

Burmese politician

- ဌေးဦး

Member of the Amyotha Hluttaw
- Incumbent
- Assumed office February 1, 2016
- Constituency: Yangon Region №.2

Personal details
- Born: July 21, 1956 (age 70) Yangon, Myanmar
- Party: National League for Democracy
- Spouse: Aye Myint
- Children: Khin Arkar
- Parent(s): Khin Maung Myint (father); Aye Myint(mother)
- Education: BSc, R.L, D.B.L, D.I.L, C.I.P (WIPO)
- Occupation: Politician

Htay Oo (Burmese: ဌေးဦး) is a Burmese politician who is a Amyotha Hluttaw MP for Yangon Region.

== Early life and education ==
Htay was born in Yangon, Myanmar on June 21, 1956. He graduated from Yangon University of BSc from 1975 to 1979, Diploma in Economic Law (2000) and Diploma in International Law (2006) at Yangon University.

He also served as Associate Teacher (Htaw Ku, Pioneer Cooperative Farm), Yangon Department of Medical Research and as a lawyer.

== Political career ==
He is a member of the National League for Democracy. In the 2015 Myanmar general election and 2020 Myanmar general election, he was elected as a Amyotha Hluttaw MP and elected representative from Yangon Region parliamentary constituency.

== Personal life ==
Htay Oo married Khin Myint. They have one daughter, Khin Arkar.
