= Aye Cho (politician) =

Burmese politician

Member of the Amyotha Hluttaw
- Incumbent
- Assumed office 3 February 2016
- Constituency: Bago Region No. 9

Personal details
- Born: 5 July 1957 (age 68) Thegone, Myanmar
- Party: National League for Democracy
- Spouse: Htay Yi
- Children: 2
- Parent(s): Hti (father); Than Yi (mother)
- Education: B.Sc (Chemistry)

Aye Cho (Burmese: အေးချို, born 5 July 1957) is a Burmese politician who currently serves as an Amyotha Hluttaw MP for Bago Region No.9 Constituency. He is a member of the National League for Democracy.

== Political career ==
He is a member of the National League for Democracy. In the 2015 Myanmar general election, he was elected as an Amyotha Hluttaw MP and elected representative from Bago Region No. 9 parliamentary constituency. He also serves as a member of Amyotha Hluttaw Education Promotion Committee.
