= Khun Win Thaung =

Burmese politician and political prisoner

Member of the Amyotha Hluttaw
- Incumbent
- Assumed office 3 February 2016
- Constituency: Kachin State № 11
- Majority: 9985 votes

Personal details
- Born: 17 October 1956 (age 69) Aung Myay Thar village, Bago, Myanmar
- Party: National League for Democracy
- Parent(s): U Pwar (father); Daw Mya (mother)
- Education: B.V.S (Rgn)

Khun Win Thaung (Burmese: ခွန်ဝင်းသောင်း, born 17 October 1956) is a Burmese politician and former political prisoner who currently serves as an Amyotha Hluttaw MP for Kachin State No. 11 constituency. He is a member of the National League for Democracy.

== Early life and education ==
He was born on 17 October 1956 in Aung Myay Thar village, Bago, Myanmar. He an ethnic Pa-O. He graduated with B.V.S (Rgn) from Yangon. He is also a veterinarian.

== Political career ==
Khun was arrested and sentenced to 5 years with hard labor under Section 5 for participation in the 8888 uprising. He is a member of the National League for Democracy. In the 2015 Myanmar general election, he was elected as an Amyotha Hluttaw MP, winning a majority of 9985 votes and elected representative from Kachin State No. 11 parliamentary constituency.
