= Shan State Hluttaw =

State legislature in Myanmar

Shan State Hluttaw ရှမ်းပြည်နယ်လွှတ်တော်, လုမ်းတႅၼ်းၽွင်းၸိုင်ႈတႆး
- 3rd State Hluttaw

Type
- Type: Unicameral

History
- Founded: January 31st, 2011

Leadership
- Speaker: Sai Lon Kyaw, USDP since 2025-26 Myanmar general election
- Deputy Speaker: Sai Tun Sein, USDP since 2025-26 Myanmar general election

Structure
- Seats: 132; 99 elected MPs; 33 military appointees
- Political groups: Military (34) Union Solidarity and Development Party (24)*; Shan Nationalities League for Democracy (26); National League for Democracy (33)*; Ta'ang National Party (7); Pa-O National Organization (7); Lahu National Development Party (1)*; Wa Democratic Party (1); Shan Nationalities Democratic Party (0); Akha National Development Party (0)*; Kokang Democracy and Unity Party (0); Lisu National Development Party (0)*; Wa National Unity Party (0); Independent (1)* Vacant (12)

Elections
- Last election: 2025-26 Myanmar general election

Meeting place
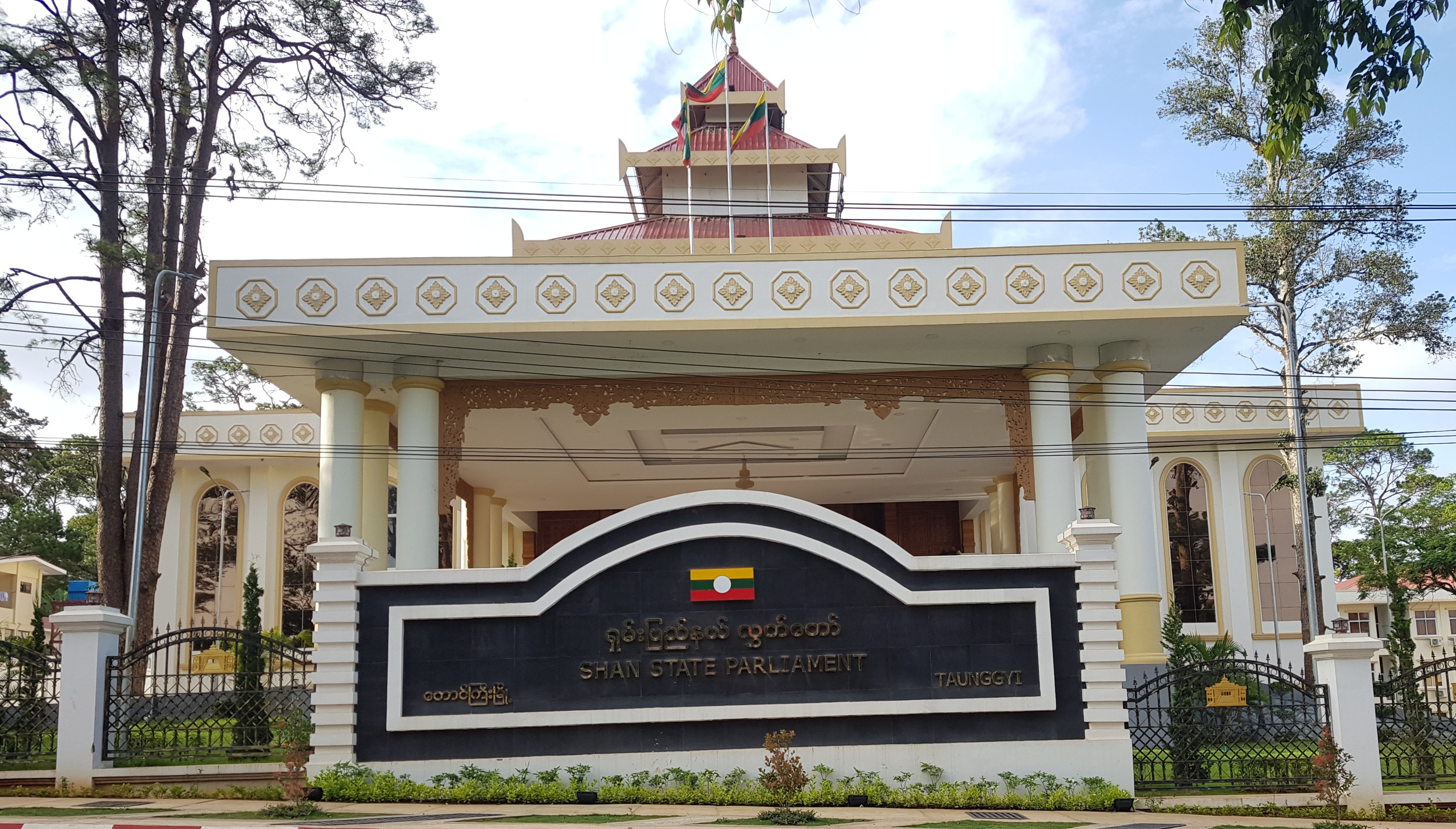
- State Hluttaw Meeting Hall; Taunggyi, Shan State

Website
- shanstate.hluttaw.mm

Footnotes
- Includes two Ethnic Ministers (Intha, Kayan) from the NLD, one Ethnic Minister (Bamar) from USDP, one Ethnic Minister (Lisu) from Lisu NDP, one Ethnic Minister (Lahu)'from Lahu NDP, one Ethnic Minister (Akha) from ANDP, one independent Ethnic Minister (Kachin)

Shan State Hluttaw (Burmese: ရှမ်းပြည်နယ်လွှတ်တော်, Shan: လုမ်းတႅၼ်းၽွင်းၸိုင်ႈတႆး; lit. 'Shan State Assembly') is the legislature of Shan State in Myanmar and was first formed in 2011, after the 2010 sham elections, under the 2008 Constitution which formed State and Region Hluttaws. It is a unicameral body, consisting of 132 legislators—99 elected members and 33 military representatives. Since the conclusion of the Hluttaw's latest election, the 2025-26 Myanmar general election, Sai Lon Kyaw of the Union Solidarity and Development Party (USDP) has led the Hluttaw as its Speaker and Sai Tun Sein has served as the hluttaw's Deputy Speaker.

== Legislative Power ==
Under the 2008 Constitution of Myanmar and specifically "Schedule Two - Region or State Legislative List" of the constitution, the Shan State Hluttaw can legislate on the following matters:

- Agriculture and Livestock Breeding Sector
- Economic Sector
- Energy, Electricity, Mining and Forestry Sector
- Finance and Planning Sector
- Industrial Sector
- Management Sector
- Social Sector
- Transport, Communication and Construction Sector

== General Election results (Nov 2010) ==
Seats of Shan State Hluttaw by Parties (November 2010)
Party	Seats	Net Gain/Loss	Seats %	Votes %	Votes	+/-
USDP	54		37.76			
SNDP	31		21.68			
PNO	6		4.2			
TNP	4		2.8			
Inn National Development Party	3		2.1			
WDP	3		2.1			
Kayan National Party	2		1.4			
LNDP	1		0.7			
NUP	1		0.7			
Independent	2		1.4			
Military appointees	36		25.17			
Total	143		100			

== General Election results (Nov 2015) ==
After the 2015 general election, the Burmese Military held on to a narrow majority of seats in the Shan State legislature. This was at the time the only State legislature in Myanmar in which the National League for Democracy (NLD) had not won the majority of seats in 2015 election. There were 14 vacant seats that were not contested due to insurgency.

Seats of Shan State Hluttaw by Parties (November 2015)
Party	Seats	Net Gain/Loss	Seats %	Votes %	Votes	+/-
USDP	32					
SNLD	24					
NLD	24					
TNP	7					
PNO	6					
WDP	2					
LNDP	2					
SNDP	1					
KDUP	1					
WNUP	1					
LNUP	1					
ANDP	1					
Independent	1					
Military appointees	34					
Total	137					

== See also ==
- State and Region Hluttaws
- Pyidaungsu Hluttaw
