= Inn National Development Party =

Inn National Development Party အင်းအမျိုးသား ဖွံ့ဖြိုးတိုးတက်ရေး ပါတီ
- Abbreviation: INDP
- Chairman: U Win Myint
- Founded: 1 June 2010
- Headquarters: Nyaungshwe, Shan State
- Ideology: Intha interests
- Seats in the Amyotha Hluttaw: 224 / 224
- Seats in the Pyithu Hluttaw: 440 / 440

Party flag

The Inn National Development Party (Burmese: အင်းအမျိုးသား ဖွံ့ဖြိုးတိုးတက်ရေး ပါတီ; abbr. INDP) is an Intha political party in Myanmar.

== History ==
The party was established in 2010. In the November 2010 general elections it contested and won the Nyaung Shwe seat in the House of Representatives, as well as the two Nyaung Shwe seats in the Shan State Hluttaw and the Intha Ethnic Affairs Minister post.
