= Saw Moe Myint =

Burmese politician

Member of the Amyotha Hluttaw
- Incumbent
- Assumed office 3 February 2016
- Constituency: Kayin State № 1
- Majority: 34849 votes

Personal details
- Born: 2 January 1947 (age 79) Taungoo, Myanmar
- Party: National League for Democracy
- Spouse: Naw Babe Than
- Parent(s): Saw Lone (father); Saw Myatv(mother)
- Education: B.E (mining), P.E (mining)

Saw Moe Myint (Burmese: စောမိုးမြင့်, born 2 January 1947) also Sin Myu Yay
(Burmese: ဆင်မြူရယ်) is a Burmese politician who currently serves as an Amyotha Hluttaw MP for Kayin State No. 1 Constituency. He is a member of the National League for Democracy.

== Early life and education ==
Saw was born on 2 January 1947 in Taungoo, Myanmar. He is an ethnic Karen. He graduated with B.E (mining), P.E (mining) from Yangon.

== Political career ==
He is a member of the National League for Democracy. In the 2015 Myanmar general election, he was elected as an Amyotha Hluttaw MP, winning a majority of 34849 votes and elected representative from Kayin State No. 1, parliamentary constituency . And then, he also serves as a member of Amyotha Hluttaw Mineral, Natural Resources and Environmental Conservation Committee.
