= Tin Wai =

Burmese politician

Member of the Amyotha Hluttaw
- Incumbent
- Assumed office 1 February 2016
- Constituency: Tanintharyi No.6
- Majority: 40,506 votes

Personal details
- Born: 11 February 1963 (age 63) Myeik, Burma (Myanmar)
- Party: National League for Democracy
- Parent(s): Than Sein (father); Tin Po (mother)

Tin Wai (Burmese: ဦးတင်ဝေ, born 11 February 1963) is a Burmese politician who currently serves as a House of Nationalities member of parliament for Tanintharyi No. 6. He is a member of National League for Democracy.

== Political career ==
Tin Wai was elected as an Amyotha Hluttaw MP, winning a majority of 40,506 votes, from Tanintharyi Region No.6 parliamentary constituency. He also serves as a member of Amyotha Hluttaw Hluttaw Rights Committee.
