= Chin State Hluttaw =

Legislature of the Burmese state of Chin State

Chin State Hluttaw ချင်းပြည်နယ်လွှတ်တော်
- 3rd Chin State Hluttaw
- Flag of the Chin State Hluttaw

Type
- Type: Unicameral
- Established: 31 January 2011; 15 years ago

Leadership
- Speaker: Kawl Lian Thang, USDP since 20 March 2026
- Deputy Speaker: Thant Sin Oo, USDP since 20 March 2026

Structure
- Seats: 24; 18 elected MPs; 6 military appointees
- Political groups: USDP: 6 seats ZNP: 4 seats NCC: 1 seat Tatmadaw: 4 seats Vacant: 9 seats

Elections
- Last election: 2025–26 Myanmar general election

Meeting place
- State Hluttaw Meeting Hall; Hakha, Chin State

Chin State Hluttaw (Burmese: ချင်းပြည်နယ်လွှတ်တော်; lit. 'Chin State Assembly') is the legislature of the Burmese state of Chin State. It is a unicameral body, consisting of 15 members, including 11 elected members and 4 military representatives.

As of March 2026, the Hluttaw was led by speaker Kawl Lian Thang of the Union Solidarity and Development Party. In the 2025 general election, the USDP won the most contested seats in the state legislature.

== History ==
=== 2026 ===
- 20 March – The Third Chin State Hluttaw was convened with Kawl Lian Thang of USDP elected as Speaker.

== Speakers ==
| | Term | Speaker | Deputy Speaker |
|---|---|---|---|
| 1 | First Chin State Hluttaw | Hau Khen Kham, USDP | Ohn Lwin, USDP |
| 2 | Second Chin State Hluttaw | Zo Bawi, NLD | Aung Than, NLD |
| 3 | Third Chin State Hluttaw | Kawl Lian Thang, USDP | Thant Sin Oo, USDP |

== Election results ==
=== 2010 ===
| Party | Seats | +/– | % |
|---|---|---|---|
| Union Solidarity and Development Party (USDP) | 7 | ▲7 | |
| Chin National Party (CNP) | 5 | ▲5 | |
| Chin Progressive Party (CPP) | 5 | ▲5 | |
| Ethnic National Development Party (ENDP) | 1 | ▲1 | |
| Tatmadaw | 6 | ▲6 | |
| Total | 24 | | |

=== 2015 ===
| Party | Seats | +/– | % |
|---|---|---|---|
| National League for Democracy (NLD) | 12 | ▲12 | 50.00 |
| Union Solidarity and Development Party (USDP) | 4 | ▼3 | 16.67 |
| Zomi Congress for Democracy (ZCD) | 2 | ▲2 | 8.33 |
| Chin National Party (CNP) | 0 | ▼5 | 0.00 |
| Chin Progressive Party (CPP) | 0 | ▼5 | 0.00 |
| Ethnic National Development Party (ENDP) | 0 | ▼1 | 0.00 |
| Tatmadaw | 6 | Steady | 25.00 |
| Total | 24 | | 100.00 |

=== 2025 ===
In the 2025-2026 general election, according to Section 4 of the Region or State Hluttaw Election Law, as amended for the sixth time in July 2025, the Election Commission must delineate constituencies as follows: for each township, one representative shall be elected using the first-past-the-post (FPTP) system; for the remaining representatives, constituencies shall be formed by combining multiple townships for election under the proportional representation (PR) system.

For the Chin State Hluttaw, 12 of the 24 elected constituencies were elected under the FPTP system, and the remaining 12 under the PR system. However, under the FPTP system, State Hluttaw elections were only able to be held in two townships: Hakha and Tedim. Consequently, according to the election results, the Union Solidarity and Development Party (USDP) won both constituencies. Under the PR system, the USDP secured 5 seats, the Zomi National Party (ZNP) won 3 seats, and the New Chinland Congress Party (NCCP) won 1 seat.

According to the list of military-appointed Region or State Hluttaw representatives announced on 11 February 2026, 4 military representatives are included in the Chin State Hluttaw.

| Party | Seats | | | % | +/- |
| Party | FPTP | PR | Σ | % | +/- |
|---|---|---|---|---|---|
| Union Solidarity and Development Party (USDP) | 2 | 5 | 7 | 31.82% | ▲3 |
| Zomi National Party (ZNP) | 0 | 3 | 3 | 13.64% | ▲3 |
| New Chinland Congress Party (NCCP) | 0 | 1 | 1 | 4.55% | ▲1 |
| Tatmadaw | 0 | | 4 | 18.18% | ▼2 |
| Vacant | 7 | 0 | 7 | 31.82% | - |
| Total | | | 22 | | |

== See also ==
- State and Region Hluttaws
- Pyidaungsu Hluttaw
