= Wa National Unity Party =

Wa National Unity Party ဝ အမျိုးသား စည်းလုံးညီညွတ်ရေးပါတီ
- Abbreviation: WNUP
- Chairman: Nyi Palote
- Founded: 2010
- Headquarters: No 36, Byuha Road, Zone 2, Ward 1, Lashio Township, Shan State
- Ideology: Wa interests
- Seats in the Amyotha Hluttaw: 0 / 224
- Seats in the Pyithu Hluttaw: 0 / 440
- Seats in the Shan State Hluttaw: 1 / 151

The Wa National Unity Party (WNUP) is a political party in Myanmar (Burma). It was founded by members of the former Wa National Development Party, which contested the 1990 general elections but did not win any seats. The party has sought to distance itself from the United Wa State Army in order to enter mainstream politics. The WNUP works together with the Nationalities Brotherhood Federation, an alliance of 23 ethnic political parties in Myanmar.

== History ==
The WNUP contested 16 constituencies in the 2015 general election, winning only a single seat in the Shan State Hluttaw.

On 4 September 2015, the WNUP's leader went to Wa State and met with Vice President Xiao Mingliang.
