= Kokang Democracy and Unity Party =

- Burmese name: ကိုးကန့် ဒီမိုကရေစီနှင့် ညီညွတ်ရေးပါတီ
- Chinese name: 果敢民主团结党
- Abbreviation: KDUP
- Chairman: Luo Xingguang
- Vice Chairman: Yan Kyin Kan
- Founded: 29 April 2010 (15 years ago)
- Headquarters: Lashio, Shan State
- Ideology: Kokang interests; Chinese nationalism; Three Principles of the People; National conservatism; Anti-communism
- Seats in the Amyotha Hluttaw: 0 / 224
- Seats in the Pyithu Hluttaw: 0 / 440

Party flag
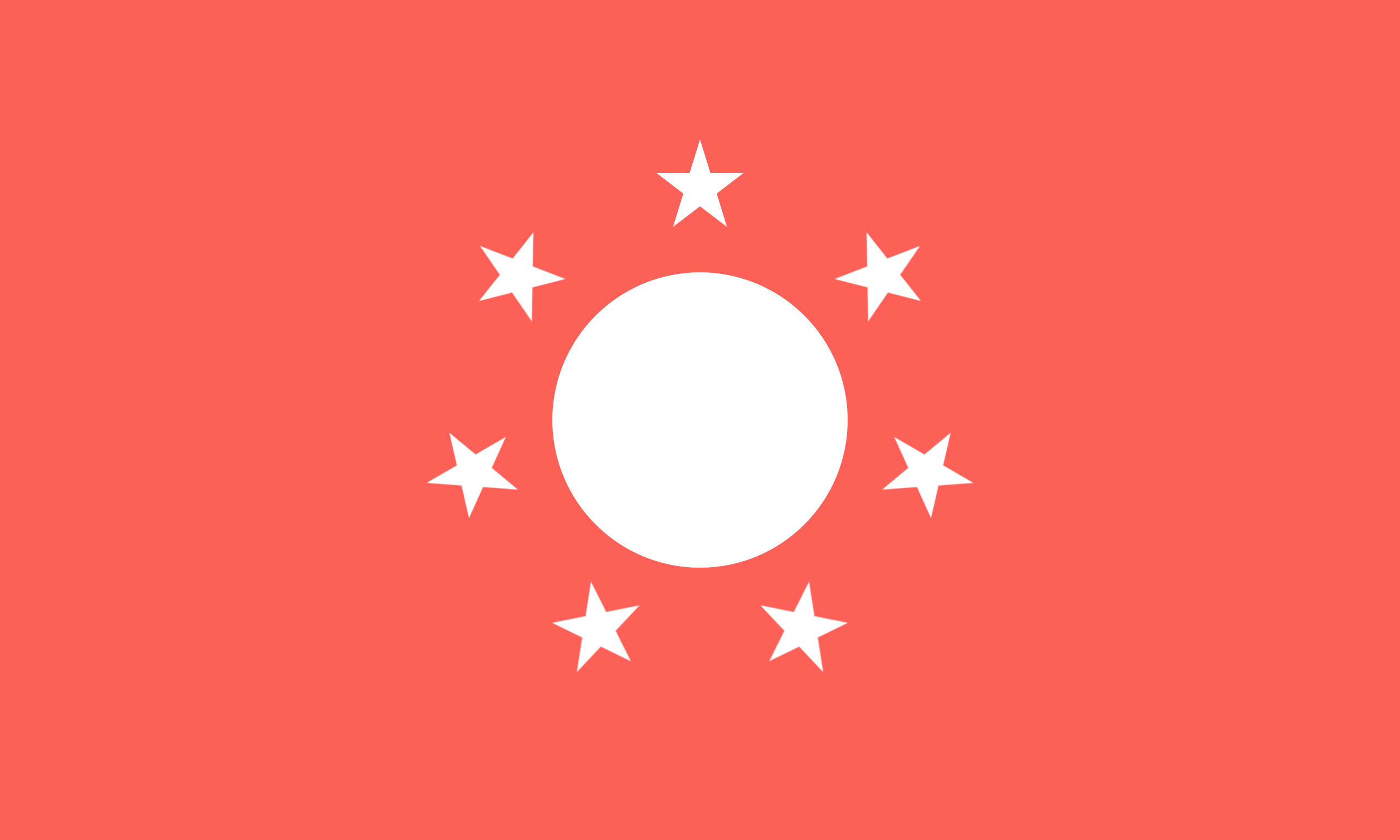

The Kokang Democracy and Unity Party (KDUP) is a political party in Myanmar (Burma) representing the interests of the Kokang Chinese and the administration in the Kokang Self-Administered Zone.

== History ==
The party contested four constituencies in the 1990 general elections, receiving 0.07% of the vote and failing to win a seat. The KDUP was re-established in 2010. In the 2010 elections, it contested constituencies in Lashio, Kunlong and Hsenwi Townships in Shan State, but again failed to win a seat.

The KDUP contested one House of Nationalities seat in the 2012 by-elections, Shan State's Constituency No. 3, fielding party's chairman, Luo Xingguang, who was believed to have ties to drug traffickers Lo Hsing Han and Liu Guoxi. In the 2015 elections the party succeeded in winning a seat in the House of Representatives and one seat in the Shan State Hluttaw.

== Election results ==
=== House of Nationalities (Amyotha Hluttaw) ===
Election	Leader	Total seats won	Total votes	Share of votes	+/-	Status
2010	Luo Xingguang	0 / 224	26,950	0.13%	New	Extra-parliamentary
2015	Luo Xingguang	0 / 224	Did not contest			Extra-parliamentary
2020	Luo Xingguang	0 / 224	Did not contest			Not recognised
2025–26	Luo Xingguang	0 / 224	Did not contest			Extra-parliamentary

=== House of Representatives (Pyithu Hluttaw) ===
Election	Leader	Total seats won	Total votes	Share of votes	+/-	Status
2010	Luo Xingguang	0 / 440	25,731	0.13%	New	Extra-parliamentary
2015	Luo Xingguang	1 / 440	13,990	0.06%	▲1	Opposition
2020	Luo Xingguang	0 / 440	9,273	0.03%	▼1	Not recognised
2025–26	Luo Xingguang	0 / 440	6,362	0.05%	0	Extra-parliamentary
