= Union of Myanmar Federation of National Politics =

Union of Myanmar Federation of National Politics ပြည်ထောင်စု မြန်မာနိုင်ငံ အမျိုးသား နိုင်ငံရေးအဖွဲ့ချုပ်
- Chairman: Aye Lwin
- Vice-Chairman: Ye Htun
- General Secretary: Khin Maung Oo
- Founded: 2005
- Headquarters: Bahan Township, Yangon, Myanmar
- Seats in the Amyotha Hluttaw: 0 / 224
- Seats in the Pyithu Hluttaw: 0 / 440

The Union of Myanmar Federation of National Politics (Burmese: ပြည်ထောင်စု မြန်မာနိုင်ငံ အမျိုးသား နိုင်ငံရေးအဖွဲ့ချုပ်, abbreviated UMFNP) is a political party in Burma (Myanmar), whose leaders are closely allied to the former ruling military junta, the State Peace and Development Council. UMFNP contested seats in the 2010 Burmese general election but won none.

It is currently contesting 2 Pyithu Hluttaw seats in the 2012 Burmese by-elections.
