= Kayin People's Party =

Kayin People's Party ကရင်ပြည်သူ့ပါတီ
- Abbreviation: KPP
- Chairman: Tun Aung Myint
- Secretary-General: Saw Say War
- Founded: 21 May 2010 (16 years ago)
- Headquarters: No 632, D/16, Arzarni Road, 4th Junction, Ward 5, Shwepyitha Township, Yangon, Myanmar
- Membership: 120,000
- Ideology: Kayin interests
- Colours: Yellow
- Seats in the Amyotha Hluttaw: 0 / 224
- Seats in the Pyithu Hluttaw: 0 / 440
- Seats in the Kayin State Hluttaw: 1 / 23

Party flag

The Kayin People's Party (S'gaw Karen: ပှၤကညီဖိပၣ်တံၣ်; Burmese: ကရင်ပြည်သူ့ပါတီ; abbreviated KPP) is a political party in Myanmar (Burma). It was formed by retired Kayin (also known as Karen) government officers to contest the 2010 general elections. It is based in Yangon where many Karen people are living.

It fielded 41 candidates in the 2010 general elections, winning six seats. It did not run in the 2012 by-elections. In the 2015 general elections it partnered with the Federal Democracy Alliance (FDA), and the Kayin Democratic Party to field over 100 candidates in constituencies across seven states and regions – Yangon, Bago, Tanintharyi, Ayeyarwady, Kayah, Kayin and Mon. However, it managed to win only a single seat in the Kayin State Hluttaw.

== Election results ==
=== House of Nationalities (Amyotha Hluttaw) ===
Election	Leader	Total seats won	Total votes	Share of votes	+/-	Status
2010	Tun Aung Myint	1 / 224	69,402	0.34%	New	Opposition
2015	Tun Aung Myint	0 / 224	120,335	0.53%	▼1	Extra-parliamentary
2020	Tun Aung Myint	0 / 224	37,623	0.14%	0	Not recognised
2025–26	Tun Aung Myint	0 / 224	Did not contest		0	Extra-parliamentary

=== House of Representatives (Pyithu Hluttaw) ===
Election	Leader	Total seats won	Total votes	Share of votes	+/-	Status
2010	Tun Aung Myint	1 / 440	67,764	0.33%	New	Opposition
2015	Tun Aung Myint	0 / 440	71,776	0.32%	▼1	Extra-parliamentary
2020	Tun Aung Myint	0 / 440	95,600	0.36%	0	Not recognised
2025–26	Tun Aung Myint	0 / 440	124,805	0.96%	0	extra-parliamentary
