= Phalon-Sawaw Democratic Party =

Phalon-Sawaw Democratic Party ဖလုံ-စဝေါ် ဒီမိုကရက်တစ်ပါတီ
- Chairman: U Saw Thein Aung
- Secretary-General: U Saw Tin Hlaing
- Founded: June 4, 2010
- Headquarters: Hpa-an, Kayin State, Myanmar
- Ideology: Karen interests
- Seats in the Amyotha Hluttaw: 1 / 224
- Seats in the Pyithu Hluttaw: 0 / 440
- Seats in the State and Regional Hluttaws: 0 / 880

The Phalon-Sawaw Democratic Party (Burmese: ဖလုံ-စဝေါ် ဒီမိုကရက်တစ်ပါတီ; PSDP), also spelled Phlone-Sqaw Democratic Party, is a Karen political party in Myanmar.

== History ==
The party was established in 2010. In the 2010 general elections it put forward four candidates for the House of Nationalities, winning three seats. Two of its five candidates were elected to the House of Representatives; it took over 70% of the vote in Karen State.

== Election results ==
=== House of Nationalities (Amyotha Hluttaw) ===
Election	Leader	Total seats won	Total votes	Share of votes	+/-	Status
2010	U Saw Thein Aung	3 / 224	77,825	0.38%	New	Opposition
2015	U Saw Thein Aung	0 / 224	40,039	0.18%	▼3	Extra-parliamentary
2020	U Saw Thein Aung	0 / 224	Did not contest			Not recognised
2025–26	U Saw Thein Aung	1 / 224	40,109	0.32%	▲1	TBA

=== House of Representatives (Pyithu Hluttaw) ===
Election	Leader	Total seats won	Total votes	Share of votes	+/-	Status
2010	U Saw Thein Aung	2 / 440	82,033	0.40%	New	Opposition
2015	U Saw Thein Aung	0 / 440	37,010	0.17%	▼2	Extra-parliamentary
2020	U Saw Thein Aung	0 / 440	514	0.00%	0	Not recognised
2025–26	U Saw Thein Aung	0 / 440	33,772	0.26%	0	Extra-parliamentary
