= Ta'ang National Party =

Ta'ang National Party တအာင်းအမျိုးသားပါတီ
- Abbreviation: TNP
- Chairman: U Aik Mone
- Secretary-General: U Tun Kyaw
- Founded: 24 May 2010 (15 years ago)
- Headquarters: Bogyoke Aung San Road, Mingalar Ward, Namhsan, Shan State
- Membership: 15,577
- Ideology: Ta'ang interests
- Colours: Blue, Red
- Seats in the Amyotha Hluttaw: 2 / 224
- Seats in the Pyithu Hluttaw: 3 / 440
- Seats in the Shan State Hluttaw: 7 / 151

Party flag

The Ta'ang National Party (Burmese: တအာင်းအမျိုးသားပါတီ, romanized: taaarinn aamyoesarrparte; abbreviated TNP), also known as the Ta'arng (Palaung) National Party, is a de-registered political party in Myanmar (Burma). The party was founded on 24 May 2010 to contest the 2010 general election, but did not participate in the 2012 by-election. The party seeks to represent the Ta'ang people (also known as the Palaung people) in the parliament of Myanmar. On 28 March, TNP was officially dissolved by the junta-appointed Union Election Commission, along with 39 other parties. Despite this, the TNP joined the Ta'ang Land Council after its establishment in June 2025.
