= Mro National Development Party =

Party flag

The Mro National Development Party (Burmese: မြိုတိုင်းရင်းသားဖွံ့ဖြိုးရေးပါတီ; MNDP) is a political party in Myanmar, representing the Mro people in the western Rakhine State.

== History ==
Following the reintroduction of multi-party democracy after the 8888 Uprising, the party was established as the Mro or Khami National Solidarity Organisation (MKNSO) by U San Tha Aung on 22 December 1988. It contested four seats in the 1990 general elections, receiving 0.17% of the vote and winning one seat; U San Tha Aung in Kyauktaw 2.

The party re-registered to contest the 2010 general elections, putting forward nine candidates, but failing to win a seat. It adopted its current name in 2014. In the 2015 general elections it nominated six candidates, again failing to win a seat.
