= Wa Democratic Party =

Wa Democratic Party 'ဝ' ဒီမိုကရက်တစ်ပါတီ
- Abbreviation: WDP
- Chairman: Khun Htun Lu
- Secretary-General: Sai Pao Nup
- Founded: 2010
- Headquarters: Theindi Road, Ward 8, Lashio Township, Shan State, Myanmar
- Membership: 15,000
- Ideology: Wa interests
- Colours: Blue, Red
- Seats in the Amyotha Hluttaw: 0 / 224
- Seats in the Pyithu Hluttaw: 1 / 440
- Seats in the Shan State Hluttaw: 2 / 147

Party flag

The Wa Democratic Party (Burmese: 'ဝ' ဒီမိုကရက်တစ်ပါတီ; abbreviated WDP) is a political party in Myanmar (Burma). The party was founded in 2010 to contest in the 2010 general election. In the 2015 general election, the party won a single seat in the Pyithu Hluttaw, and 2 seats in the Shan State Hluttaw.
