= Unity and Democracy Party of Kachin State =

Unity and Democracy Party of Kachin State စည်းလုံးညီညွတ်ရေးနှင့် ဒီမိုကရေစီပါတီ ကချင်ပြည်နယ်
- Abbreviation: UDPKS
- Chairman: U Khat Htein Nan
- Founded: 2 August 2010 (15 years ago)
- Headquarters: 238B, Pyidaungsu Road, Yuzana Ward, Myitkyina, Kachin State, Myanmar
- Ideology: Kachin interests Federalism
- Colours: Green
- Seats in the Amyotha Hluttaw: 0 / 224
- Seats in the Pyithu Hluttaw: 0 / 440
- Seats in the Kachin State Hluttaw: 1 / 53

Party flag

The Unity and Democracy Party of Kachin State (UDPKS) is a political party in Myanmar seeking to represent the interests of the Kachin people. It was founded on 2 August 2010 and is one of the few ethnic minority parties to have formed an alliance with the Union Solidarity and Development Party, a move which has damaged the party's legitimacy amongst some Kachin people. The party currently had two representatives in the Union Hluttaw (2010-2015), Daw Doi Bu and U Hkyet Thing Nan, representing the Injanyang constituency and Myitkyina Constituency. Since April 2018, the UDPKS is in the merging process of becoming one Kachin Party, Kachin State Party, with Kachin State Democracy Party, Kachin Democratic Party and Kachin National Congress through the support from civil society organizations in Kachin State.
