= Democratic Party (Myanmar) =

Democratic Party ဒီမိုကရက်တစ်ပါတီ
- Abbreviation: DP
- Chairman: U Thu Wai
- Secretary-General: Daw Than Than Nu
- Spokesperson: U Hla Myint
- Vice-Chairman: U Tin Swe
- Secretary: Daw Cho Cho Kyaw Nyein
- Founded: 1988
- Headquarters: Pazundaung Township, Yangon, Myanmar
- Ideology: Liberal democracy
- Seats in the Mandalay Region Hluttaw: 1 / 76

Party flag

The Democratic Party (Burmese: ဒီမိုကရက်တစ်ပါတီ, pronounced [dìmòkəɹɛʔtɪʔ pàtì]; abbreviated DP) is a political party in Myanmar (Burma), founded in 1988. It was formally registered in May 2010, with its headquarters in Pazundaung Township, Yangon.

The party's chairman is U Thu Wai, a former political prisoner. The party's secretaries, Mya Than Than Nu and Cho Cho Kyaw Nyein, are the daughters of U Nu (former prime minister) and Kyaw Nyein (former deputy prime minister), all well-known Burmese political leaders in the Anti-Fascist People's Freedom League.

The party contested in the 2010 general election, winning 3 seats in the State and Regional Hluttaws. The party won only a single seat in the 2015 general election, out of the 52 seats it contested. U Aung Shwe, the party's candidate representing Chan Aye Thar San Township for the Mandalay Region Hluttaw, won a majority of the votes, because that the candidate representing the National League for Democracy was rejected before the election.
