= All Mon Region Democracy Party =

- Burmese name: မွန်ဒေသလုံးဆိုင်ရာ ဒီမိုကရေစီပါတီ
- Mon name: ဗော်ဒီမဵုကရေဇြဳအလုံရးမန်
- Abbreviation: AMRDP
- Vice-Chairman: Nai Hla Aung
- Founded: 7 April 2010 (15 years ago)
- Merged into: Mon Unity Party
- Headquarters: Mawlamyaing, Mon State
- Ideology: Mon interests
- Seats in the Amyotha Hluttaw: 0 / 224
- Seats in the Pyithu Hluttaw: 0 / 440
- Seats in the Mon State Hluttaw: 1 / 31

Party flag

The All Mon Region Democracy Party (AMRDP) was a political party in Myanmar, representing the interests of the Mon people. In the 2010 Myanmar general election, which was boycotted by both the main opposition National League for Democracy and the other main Mon party, the Mon National Party, the AMRDP won 16 total seats, 3 in the Pyithu Hluttaw (the lower house), 4 in the Amyotha Hluttaw and 9 in regional hluttaws.

In 2013, there were reports that the party agreed to merge with the MNP. However, a party called the AMRDP contested the 2015 general election, where it won no seats in the national parliament and just one seat in the Mon State Hluttaw.

The party's former chairperson Nai Ngwe Thein died on 2 October 2018.
