= Kayin State Democracy and Development Party =

Kayin State Democracy and Development Party ကရင်ပြည်နယ် ဒီမိုကရေစီနှင့် ဖွံ့ဖြိုးတိုးတက်ရေးပါတီ
- Chairman: Saw Tha Htoo Kyaw
- Founded: August 19, 2010
- Headquarters: Hpa-An, Kayin State
- Membership: 5,000+
- Ideology: Federalism

The Kayin State Democracy and Development Party (Burmese: ကရင်ပြည်နယ်ဒီမိုကရေစီနှင့်ဖွံ့ဖြိုးတိုးတက်ရေးပါတီ, KSDDP) is a political party in Myanmar.

== History ==
The party was established in 2010. In the November 2010 general elections it won one seat in the House of Nationalities.
