= Democracy and Peace Party =

Burmese political party

The Democracy and Peace Party (Burmese: ဒီမိုကရေစီနှင့် ငြိမ်းချမ်းရေးပါတီ, pronounced [dìmòkəɹèsì n̥ɪ̰ɰ̃ ɲéiɰ̃dʑáɰ̃jé pàtì]; abbreviated DPP; formerly the League for Democracy and Peace) is a Burmese political party registered in May 2010, with headquarters in Pabedan Township, Yangon. It contested the 2010 general election in Burma. DPP's chairman is Aung Than, a high court attorney and a member of the League for Democracy and Peace (ဒီမိုကရေစီနှင့် ငြိမ်းချမ်းရေး အဖွဲ့ချုပ်), a political party founded by former Prime Minister U Nu in 1988. On 28 August 1988, at the peak for pre-democracy movement in Burma, U Nu, with his colleagues who were mostly former members of democratically elected government which was forcefully dissolved by the coup d'état of Ne Win, formed the League for Democracy and Peace (LDP). LDP contested the 1990 election but did not win any seats and was subsequently deregistered.
