= Shan and Nationalities Democratic Party =

Political party in Myanmar

Shan and Nationalities Democratic Party ရှမ်းနှင့် တိုင်းရင်းသားများ ဒီမိုကရက်တစ်ပါတီ
- Abbreviation: SNDP
- Chairman: Sai Aik Paung
- Vice-Chairman: Sai Saung Si
- General Secretary: Sai Hla Kyaw
- Founded: 8 April 2010 (16 years ago)
- Headquarters: No. 173, Shwegondaing Road, Ward 5, Thaketa Township, Yangon Region
- Ideology: Shan interests Conservatism; Minority interests
- Seats in the Amyotha Hluttaw: 1 / 224
- Seats in the Pyithu Hluttaw: 7 / 440
- Seats in the Shan State Hluttaw: 1 / 151

Election symbol

Party flag

Website
- https://sndp.party/

The Shan and Nationalities Democratic Party (Burmese: ရှမ်းနှင့် တိုင်းရင်းသားများ ဒီမိုကရက်တစ်ပါတီ [ʃáɴ táɪɴjɪ́ɴðámjá dìmòkərɛʔtɪʔ pàtì]; abbreviated SNDP), also known as the White Tiger Party or Kya Phyu Party, formerly the Shan Nationalities Democratic Party is a nation-wide contested political party in Myanmar.

Unlike the similarly named Shan Nationalities League for Democracy (SNLD), the party prefers the status quo of 7 states and 7 regions, rather than the SNLD's preference for a federal system with 8 states.

== History ==
The party was formally registered in April 2010. The party's headquarters are in South Okkalapa Township, Yangon, and its chairman since founding is Sai Aik Paung, a former member of the central executive committee of the Shan Nationalities League for Democracy.

In the 2010 general election, the party contested seats in Shan State, Kachin State and the Mandalay Region. After the 2010 general election, the two SNDP representatives in the Shan State Hluttaw, Sai Aik Paung and Sai Naw Kham, were appointed ethnic affairs ministers of Shan State.

In December 2011, the party's head office moved to Taunggyi, the capital of Shan State. It later moved to the Yangon region.

After the 2021 Myanmar coup d'état the party met with the regime appointed Union Election Commission and took part in the Political Parties Group of the Union Peace Dialogue Joint Committee, that aimed to represent the interests of political parties willing to work with the military regime, with party chairman Sai Aik Paung chairing the group.

The party was re-registered as a political party in 2023, after the regime enacted a new law on political parties. It changed its name to Shan and Nationalities Democratic Party to allow it to field candidates outside of Shan State and run as one of the six nation-wide contested parties. It ran candidates in the regime-controlled 2025–26 Myanmar general election and became the second largest elected group in the Pyithu Hluttaw with 6 seats, behind the military-dominated Union Solidarity and Development Party that won 233 seats. Party chairman Sai Aik Paung protested the conduct of the elections as unfair and alleged ballot manipulations by the regime.

== Election results ==
=== House of Nationalities (Amyotha Hluttaw) ===
Election	Leader	Total seats won	Total votes	Share of votes	+/–	Government
2010	Sai Aik Paung	3 / 224	496,039		▲3	Opposition
(after) 2012	Sai Aik Paung	4 / 224	—N/a		▲1	Opposition
2015	Sai Aik Paung	0 / 224	123,198	0.54%	▼4	Extra-Parliamentary
2020	Sai Aik Paung	0 / 224	99,853	0.37%	0	Results annulled
2025–26	Sai Aik Paung	1 / 224	867,536	6.86%	▲1	TBA

=== House of Representatives (Pyithu Hluttaw) ===
Election	Leader	Total seats won	Total votes	Share of votes	+/–	Government
2010	Sai Aik Paung	18 / 440	508,780	2.44%	▲18	Opposition
(after) 2012	Sai Aik Paung	18 / 440	—N/a		0	Opposition
2015	Sai Aik Paung	0 / 440	120,815	0.54%	▼18	Extra-Parliamentary
2020	Sai Aik Paung	0 / 440	94,155	0.35%	0	Results annulled
2025–26	Sai Aik Paung	7 / 440	802,414	6.16%	▲7	TBA

=== By-election ===
Election	Seats up for election	Seats contested by party	Contested seats won	Contested seats lost	Total votes	Share of votes	Outcome of election
2012	37 (Pyithu) / 5 (Amyotha)	1 (Pyithu) / 3 (Amyotha)	0 (Pyithu) / 1 (Amyotha)	1 (Pyithu) / 2 (Amyotha)			1 seat gain from USDP
2014	13 (Pyithu) / 6 (Amyotha)						

== See also ==
- Shan Nationalities League for Democracy
