= Mon National Defence Army =

Ethnic armed organisation in Myanmar

- Leader: Ja Lwan Hta
- Dates active: 1995–2011
- Headquarters: Ye Township
- Active regions: Mon State
- Ideology: Mon nationalism Separatism
- Size: 30
- Wars: the Internal conflict in Myanmar

The Mon National Defence Army (also known as the Mon National Warrior Army) was a splinter group of the Mon National Liberation Army (MNLA) in Myanmar formed in retaliation for the New Mon State Party entering a ceasefire with the State Peace and Development Council. The MNDA eventually united with another breakaway MNLA faction led by Nai Pan Nyunt on 29 November 2001, to form the Monland Restoration Army.

Initially, the MRA/HRP alliance engaged in numerous clashes with the SPDC and MNLA in early 2002. However, the strength of the splinter groups deteriorated by 2003 as most members defected back to the MNLA.

After the MNLA ended their ceasefire with the SPDC in September 2010, both the MNDA and the MRA reunited.
