= Chin Progressive Party =

Chin Progressive Party ချင်းတိုးတက်ရေးပါတီ
- Abbreviation: CPP
- Senior figures: Pu No Than Kap; Salai Say Htoo
- Founded: 1 June 2010
- Headquarters: Kyauktada Township, Yangon Division
- Ideology: Chin interests
- Seats in the Amyotha Hluttaw: 0 / 224
- Seats in the Pyithu Hluttaw: 0 / 440
- Seats in the State and Regional Hluttaws: 0 / 880

The Chin Progressive Party (Burmese: ချင်းတိုးတက်ရေးပါတီ; abbreviated CPP) is a Chin political party in Myanmar.

== History ==
The party was formed on 24 March 2010. In the November 2010 general elections it put forward 13 candidates for the House of Nationalities, winning four seats. Two of its seven candidates were elected to the House of Representatives. It also won five seats in the Chin State Hluttaw and one in the Sagaing Region Hluttaw.
