= Kayan National Party =

Myanmar political party

The Kayan National Party is a political party in Myanmar.

Unlike Kayan New Land Party and other parties which failed to be approved by the Union Election Commission (UEC) in Kayah State, it was allowed to register to contest the election in 2011.
