= Chin National Party =

Political party in Myanmar

Chin National Party ချင်းအမျိုးသားပါတီ
- Chairman: Zozam (Zam Cin Pau)
- Spokesperson: Boot Za Nan
- Vice-Chairman: Chan Hae
- General Secretary: Salai Ceubikthawng
- Founded: 7 April 2010
- Headquarters: Insein Township, Yangon Region, Myanmar
- Ideology: Chin Minority politics
- Seats in the Amyotha Hluttaw: 0 / 224
- Seats in the Pyithu Hluttaw: 0 / 440

Party flag

Website
- chinnational-party.org

The Chin National Party (Burmese: ချင်းအမျိုးသားပါတီ, abbreviated CNP) is a political party in Burma, representing the interests of the Chin people. In the 2010 Burmese general election, CNP contested constituencies only in Chin State and won 9 total seats, 2 in the Pyithu Hluttaw (the lower house), 2 in the Amyotha Hluttaw and 5 in regional hluttaws.
