= Pyithu Hluttaw =

Houses of the Myanmar parliament

Pyithu Hluttaw ပြည်သူ့လွှတ်တော်
- 3rd Pyithu Hluttaw

Type
- Type: House of the Pyidaungsu Hluttaw

History
- Founded: 31 January 2011
- Preceded by: Pyithu Hluttaw (1974-1988)
- New session started: 16 March 2026

Leadership
- Speaker: Khin Yi, USDP since 16 March 2026
- Deputy Speaker: Maung Maung Ohn, USDP since 16 March 2026

Structure
- Seats: 440 MPs
- Political groups: USDP (231); Tatmadaw (110); SNDP (7); PNO (5); MUP (5); NUP (4); NNP (4); DNDP (1); KNDP (1); INLP (1); KSPP (1); SSP (1); RNP (1); Independent (1); Vacant (67): Vacant (67)
- Length of term: 5 years

Elections
- Voting system: First-past-the-post voting (330 seats); Military appointees (110 seats) (Note: Nominated by the Commander-in-Chief of Defence Services)
- First election: 7 November 2010
- Last election: 28 December 2025 – 25 January 2026

Meeting place
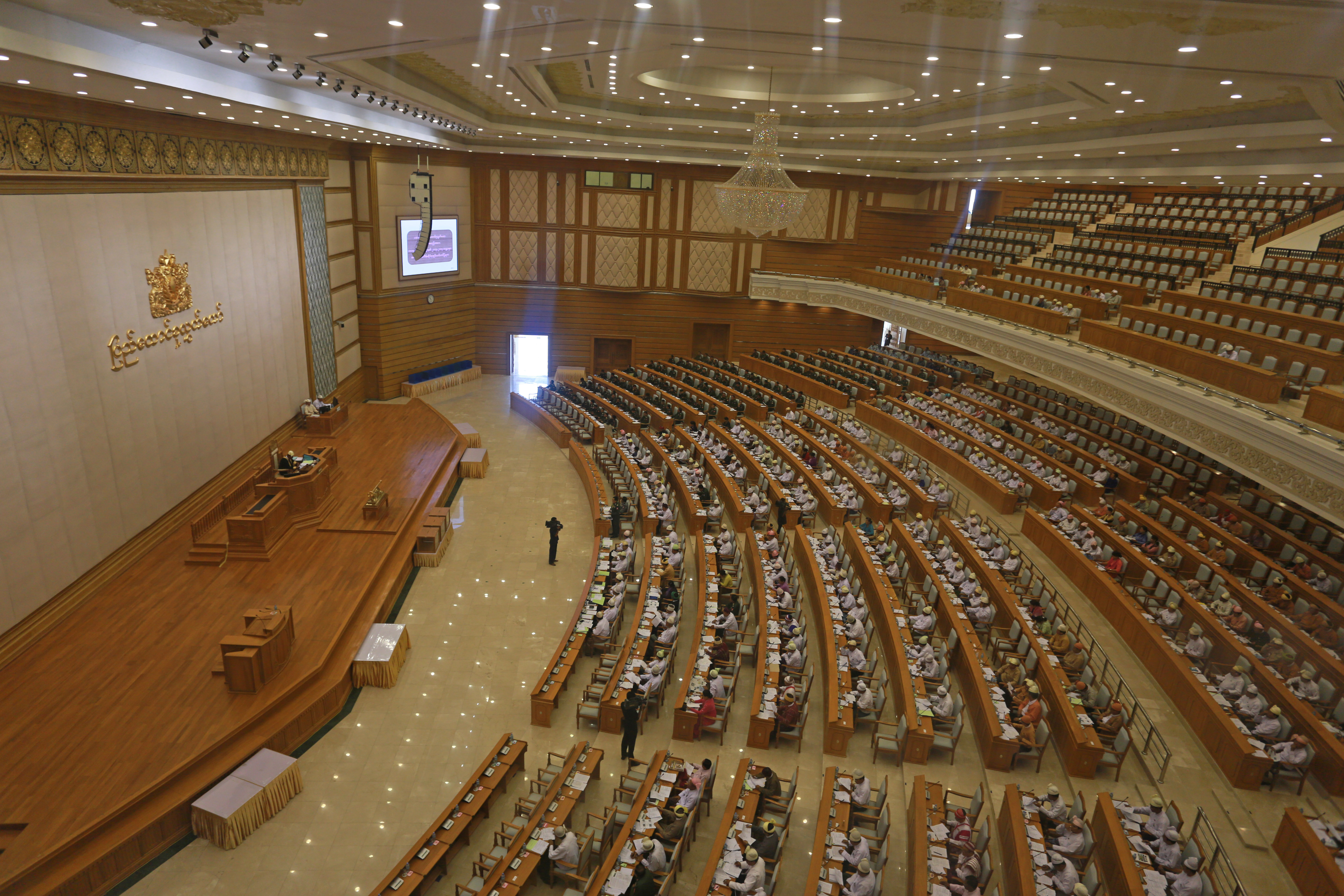
- Pyidaungsu Hluttaw Complex; Naypyidaw, Naypyidaw Union Territory

Website
- www.pyithu.hluttaw.mm

Constitution
- Constitution of Myanmar

The Pyithu Hluttaw (Burmese: ပြည်သူ့လွှတ်တော်, pronounced [pjìðṵ l̥ʊʔtɔ̀]; lit. 'People's Assembly') is one of the houses of the Pyidaungsu Hluttaw, the bicameral legislature of Myanmar (Burma). It consists of 440 members, of which 330 are directly elected through the first-past-the-post system in each townships (the third-level administrative divisions of Myanmar), and 110 are appointed by the Myanmar Armed Forces, under a constitutional provision that has no parallel in the world. There is no upper house and lower house in Pyidaungsu Hluttaw as both Pyithu Hluttaw and Amyotha Hluttaw enjoy equal status as per the constitution.

After the 2010 general election, Thura Shwe Mann was elected as the first Speaker of the Pyithu Hluttaw.

As of 8 November 2015, 90% of the members are men (389 members) and 10% are women (44 members).

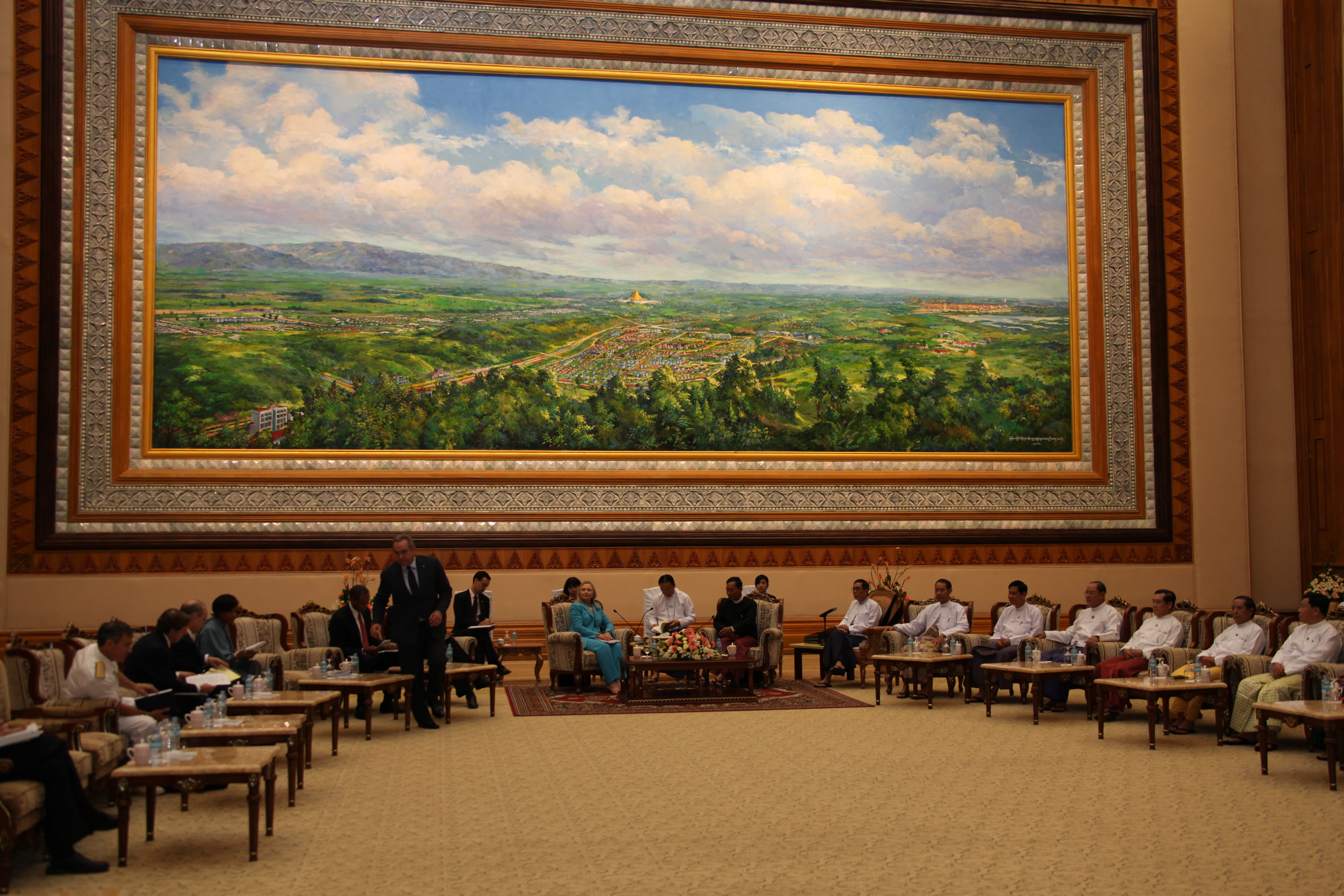
Hillary Clinton at a conference chamber in the Pyithu Hluttaw

Due to the coup d'état on 1 February 2021, the day the new session was set to begin after the 2020 Myanmar general election, the new session did not start. Instead, the assembly was kept vacant for five years until the 2025–26 Myanmar general election, and convened on 16 March 2026.

== Leadership ==
Term	Speaker	Deputy Speaker
1st Pyithu Hluttaw	Thura Shwe Mann	Nanda Kyaw Swa
2nd Pyithu Hluttaw	Win Myint (2016–2018)	T Khun Myat
2nd Pyithu Hluttaw	T Khun Myat (2018–2026)	Tun Tun Hein
3rd Pyithu Hluttaw	Khin Yi	Maung Maung Ohn

== Composition ==
=== 2026-2031 ===
Pyithu Hluttaw elections, 2025–26
	Party	Seats	Seats %	+/-
1	USDP	231	52.38%	▲201
2	SNDP	7	1.59%	▲7
3	PNO	5	1.13%	▲2
4	MUP	5	1.13%	▲5
5	NUP	4	0.91%	▲4
6	NNP	4	0.91%	▲4
7	KNDP	1	0.23%	▲1
8	RNP	1	0.23%	▲1
9	SSP	1	0.23%	▲1
10	DNDP	1	0.23%	▲1
11	INLP	1	0.23%	▲1
12	KSPP	1	0.23%	▲1
13	Independent	1	0.23%	▲1
14	Tatmadaw	110	24.94%	Steady
-	Vacant	67	15.19%	
	Total	440		
	Source:			

Constituency boundaries

=== 2016–2021 ===
Pyithu Hluttaw elections, 2015
Party	Seats	Net gain/loss	Seats %	Votes %	Votes	+/−
NLD	255	▲218	57.95			
USDP	30	▼182	6.82			
ANP	12	▲4	2.73			
SNLD	12	▲12	2.73			
PNO	3	Steady	0.68			
TNP	3	▲1	0.68			
LNDP	2	▲2	0.45			
ZCD	2	▲2	0.45			
KSDP	1	Steady	0.23			
KDUP	1	Steady	0.23			
WDP	1	▼1	0.23			
Independent	1	▲1	0.23			
Cancelled due to insurgency	7		1.59			
Military appointees	110	Steady	25.00	–	–	0
Total	440		100	100		

Results are as of 20 November 2015.

=== 2011–2016 ===
Pyithu Hluttaw elections, 2010
Party	Seats	Net gain/loss	Seats %	Votes %	Votes	+/−
USDP	259		58.86	56.76	11,858,125	
SNDP	18		4.09	2.44	508,780	
NUP	12		2.73	19.44	4,060,802	
RNDP	9		2.05	2.87	599,008	
NDF	8		1.82	7.10	1,483,329	
AMRDP	3		0.68	0.80	167,928	
PNO	3		0.68			
CNP	2		0.45	0.17	36,098	
CPP	2		0.45	0.36	76,463	
PSDP	2		0.45	0.39	82,038	
WDP	2		0.45	0.13	27,546	
Others	10		2.29	9.54	1,992,590	
Military appointees	110	▲110	25.00	–	–	
Total	440		100	100	20,892,707	

- The 3 Pa-O National Organisation candidates ran unopposed.

Pyithu Hluttaw by-election, 2012
Party	Seats	Net gain/loss	Seats %	Votes %	Votes	+/−
USDP	212	▼47	48.18			
NLD	37	▲37	8.41			
SNDP	18		4.09			
NUP	12		2.73			
RNDP	9		2.05			
NDF	8		1.82			
AMRDP	3		0.68			
PNO	3		0.68			
CNP	2		0.45			
CPP	2		0.45			
PSDP	2		0.45			
WDP	2		0.45			
Others	10		2.28			
Military appointees	110		25.00	–	–	
Vacant	10	▲10	2.28			
Total	440		100	100		

== Voting seats by region and state ==
Party	Region							State							Territory	Total seats by party
Party	Ayeyarwady	Bago	Magway	Mandalay	Sagaing	Tanintharyi	Yangon	Chin	Kachin	Kayah	Kayin	Mon	Rakhine	Shan^{1}	Naypyidaw	Total seats by party
Union Solidarity and Development Party	20	21	18	25	31	8	31	5	14	7	4	5	8	23	1	221
National League for Democracy	5	4	5	6	3	2	6	–	–	–	–	1	–	1	4	37
Shan Nationalities League for Democracy	–	–	–	–	–	–	–	–	1	–	–	–	–	17	–	18
National Unity Party	1	3	1	–	3	–	–	–	1	–	–	1	–	2	–	12
National Democratic Force	–	–	–	–	–	–	8	–	–	–	–	–	–	–	–	8
Rakhine Nationalities Development Party	–	–	–	–	–	–	–	–	–	–	–	–	9	–	–	9
All Mon Region Democracy Party	–	–	–	–	–	–	–	–	–	–	–	3	–	–	–	3
Pa-O National Organisation	–	–	–	–	–	–	–	–	–	–	–	–	–	3	–	3
Chin National Party	–	–	–	–	–	–	–	2	–	–	–	–	–	–	–	2
Chin Progressive Party	–	–	–	–	–	–	–	2	–	–	–	–	–	–	–	2
Phalon-Sawaw Democratic Party	–	–	–	–	–	–	–	–	–	–	2	–	–	–	–	2
Wa Democratic Party	–	–	–	–	–	–	–	–	–	–	–	–	–	2	–	2
Unity and Democracy Party of Kachin State	–	–	–	–	–	–	–	–	1	–	–	–	–	–	–	1
Kayin People's Party	–	–	–	–	–	–	–	–	–	–	1	–	–	–	–	1
Inn National Development Party	–	–	–	–	–	–	–	–	–	–	–	–	–	1	–	1
Taaung (Palaung) National Party	–	–	–	–	–	–	–	–	–	–	–	–	–	1	–	1
Other Parties and Independents	–	–	1	–	–	–	–	–	–	–	–	–	–	1	–	2
Total seats	26	28	25	31	37	10	45	9	17	7	7	10	17	51	5	325

Notes:

1. In Shan state voting the five seats is cancelled

Pyithu Hluttaw seats elected by Regions and States (November 2015)
Region/State	NLD	USDP	ANP	SNLD	TNP	PNO	ZCD	KSDP	KDUP	LNDP	WDP	Independent	Total
Kachin State	12	3						1		2			18
Kayah State	6	1											7
Kayin State	6	1											7
Chin State	7						2						9
Mon State	9	1											10
Rakhine State	4	1	12										17
Shan State	12	15		12	3	3			1		1	1	48
Sagaing Region	36	1											37
Tanintharyi Region	10												10
Bago Region	27	1											28
Magway Region	25												25
Mandalay Region	27	4											31
Yangon Region	44	1											45
Ayeyarwady Region	25	1											26
Naypyidaw Territory	4	1											5
Total	255	30	12	12	3	3	2	1	1	2	1	1	323

Note: Result as of 20 Nov 2015. Elections in seven townships of Shan State were cancelled due to armed conflicts. Military appointed were not included in this table.

== See also ==
- Politics of Burma
- List of legislatures by country
- Assembly of the Union
- State and Region Hluttaws
