= Amyotha Hluttaw =

House of the Myanmar legislature

Amyotha Hluttaw အမျိုးသားလွှတ်တော်

Type
- Type: House of the Pyidaungsu Hluttaw
- Term limits: 3 consecutive years upon reelection

History
- Founded: 31 January 2011
- Preceded by: Pyithu Hluttaw (1974–1988)
- New session started: 18 March 2026

Leadership
- Speaker: Aung Lin Dwe, USDP since 18 March 2026
- Deputy Speaker: Jeng Phang Naw Taung, USDP since 18 March 2026

Structure
- Seats: 224 MPs
- Political groups: USDP (108); Tatmadaw (56); NUP (16); PP (5); MUP (5); KNDP (3); AFP (3); ZNP (3); PNO (2); PPP (1); SNDP (1); DNDP (1); NIDP (1); PSDP (1); TLNDP (1); KSPP (1); RNP (1); PNUP (1); KSPP (1); NNP (4); WNP (1); Vacant (11): Vacant (11)
- Length of term: 5 years

Elections
- Voting system: Mixed-member majoritarian representation (parallel voting) (168 seats); Military appointees (56 seats) (Note: Nominated by the Commander-in-Chief of Defence Services)
- First election: 7 November 2010
- Last election: 28 December 2025 – 25 January 2026

Meeting place
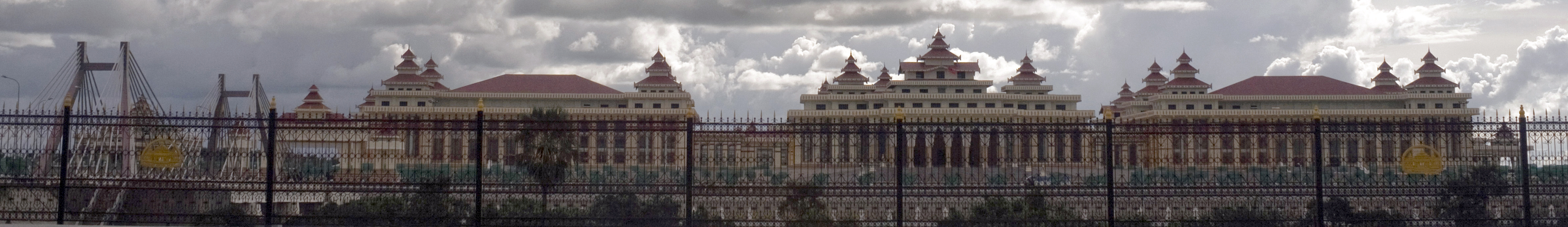
- Pyidaungsu Hluttaw Complex, Naypyidaw

Website
- www.amyothahluttaw.hluttaw.mm

Constitution
- Constitution of Myanmar

The Amyotha Hluttaw (Burmese: အမျိုးသားလွှတ်တော်, IPA: [ʔəmjóðá l̥ʊʔtɔ̀]; lit. 'National Assembly') is one of the houses of the Pyidaungsu Hluttaw, the bicameral legislature of Myanmar (Burma). It consists of 224 members, of which 168 are directly elected and 56 appointed by the Myanmar Armed Forces. There is no upper house and lower house in Pyidaungsu Hluttaw as both Pyithu Hluttaw and Amyotha Hluttaw enjoy equal status as per the constitution.

Due to the coup d'état on 1 February 2021, the day the new session was set to begin after the 2020 Myanmar general election, the new session did not start. Instead, the assembly was kept vacant for five years until the 2025–26 Myanmar general election, with the assembly convened on 18 March 2026.

The first session of the 3rd Amyotha Hluttaw was convened on 18 March 2026, Aung Lin Dwe and Jeng Phang Naw Taung were elected Speaker and Deputy Speaker of the Amyotha Hluttaw and Speaker and Deputy Speaker of the Pyidaungsu Hluttaw as a whole.

Amyotha Hluttaw (National Assembly) Building

== Composition ==
Constituency boundaries

The Amyotha Hluttaw consists of 224 members: 168 directly elected and 56 appointed by the Myanmar Armed Forces, under a unique constitutional provision that has no parallel in the world. Twelve representatives are elected by each state or region (inclusive of relevant Union territories, and including one representative from each Self-Administered Division or Self-Administered Zone).

=== 2016–2021 ===
Amyotha Hluttaw elections, 2015
Party	Seats	Net gain/loss	Seats %	Votes %	Votes	+/−
NLD	135	▲132	60.27			
USDP	11	▼113	4.91			
ANP	10	▲4	4.46			
SNLD	3	▲2	1.34			
TNP	2	▲2	0.89			
ZCD	2	▲2	0.89			
MNP	1	▲1	0.45			
NUP	1	▼4	0.45			
PNO	1	▲1	0.45			
Independent	2	▲2	0.89			
AMRDP	0	▼4	0			
SNDP	0	▼3	0			
Others	0	▼18	0			
Military appointees	56	Steady	25.00	–	–	0
Total	224		100	100		

Amyotha Hluttaw by Regions and States, 2015
Region/State	NLD	USDP	ANP	SNLD	ZCD	PNO	TNP	MNP	NUP	Independent	Total
Kachin State	10								1	1	12
Kayah State	9	2								1	12
Kayin State	10	2									12
Chin State	9	1			2						12
Mon State	11							1			12
Rakhine State	1	1	10								12
Shan State	3	3		3		1	2				12
Sagaing Region	12										12
Tanintharyi Region	12										12
Bago Region	12										12
Magway Region	12										12
Mandalay Region	10	2									12
Yangon Region	12										12
Ayeyarwady Region	12										12
Total	135	11	10	3	2	1	2	1	1	2	168

The 2015 election results are as of 20 November 2015. Military appointees are not included in the Amyotha Hluttaw by Regions and States, 2015 table.

=== 2011–2016 ===
General election, 2010
Party	Seats	%
Union Solidarity and Development Party	129	57.59
Rakhine Nationalities Development Party	7	3.13
National Unity Party	5	2.23
National Democratic Force	4	1.79
All Mon Region Democracy Party	4	1.79
Chin Progressive Party	4	1.79
Shan Nationalities Democratic Party	3	1.33
Phalon-Sawaw Democratic Party	3	1.33
Chin National Party	2	0.89
Pa-O National Organisation	1	0.45
Kayin People's Party	1	0.45
Taaung (Palaung) National Party	1	0.45
Wa Democratic Party	1	0.45
Unity and Democracy Party of Kachin State	1	0.45
Kayin State Democracy and Development Party	1	0.45
Independent	1	0.45
Military appointees	56	25.00
Total	224	100

Changes between 2010 and 2012, which were not addressed by the 2012 by-election
Date	Constituency	Old MP	Party	New MP	Party	Note
August 2011	Rangoon Division No. 3	Phone Myint Aung	NDF	Phone Myint Aung	NNDP	Changed party membership
December 2011	Rangoon Region No. 4	Myat Nyana Soe	NDF	Myat Nyana Soe	NLD	Changed party membership
28 January 2012	Sagaing Division No. 2	Bogyi aka Aung Ngwe	USDP	–	–	Deceased

By-election, 2012
Party	Seats won	Change	Seats before	Seats after
Union Solidarity and Development Party	1	▼5	128	123
Rakhine Nationalities Development Party	0	Steady	7	7
National Unity Party	0	Steady	5	5
National League for Democracy	4	▲4	1	5
National Democratic Force	0	Steady	2	2
New National Democracy Party	0	Steady	1	1
All Mon Region Democracy Party	0	Steady	4	4
Chin Progressive Party	0	Steady	4	4
Shan Nationalities Democratic Party	1	▲1	3	4
Phalon-Sawaw Democratic Party	0	Steady	3	3
Chin National Party	0	Steady	2	2
Pa-O National Organization	0	Steady	1	1
Kayin People's Party	0	Steady	1	1
Taaung (Palaung) National Party	0	Steady	1	1
Wa Democratic Party	0	Steady	1	1
Unity and Democracy Party of Kachin State	0	Steady	1	1
Kayin State Democracy and Development Party	0	Steady	1	1
Independent	0	Steady	1	1
Vacant	0	Steady	1	1
Military appointees	–	–	56	56
Total	6	Steady	224	224

Changes between 2012 and 2015
Date	Constituency	Old MP	Party	New MP	Party	Note
5 February 2013	Rangoon Division No. 6	Tin Shwe	NDF	–	–	Became a Deputy Minister
2013	Arakan State No. 4	Maung Sa Pru	RNDP	–	–	Deceased

== See also ==
- Politics of Burma
- List of legislatures by country
- Assembly of the Union
- State and Region Hluttaws
