= 2017 Myanmar by-elections =

2017 Myanmar by-election
- 1 April 2017

9 (of the 440) seats to the Pyithu Hluttaw (House of Representatives) 3 (of the 224) seats to the Amyotha Hluttaw (House of Nationalities) 7 seats to Regional Parliaments
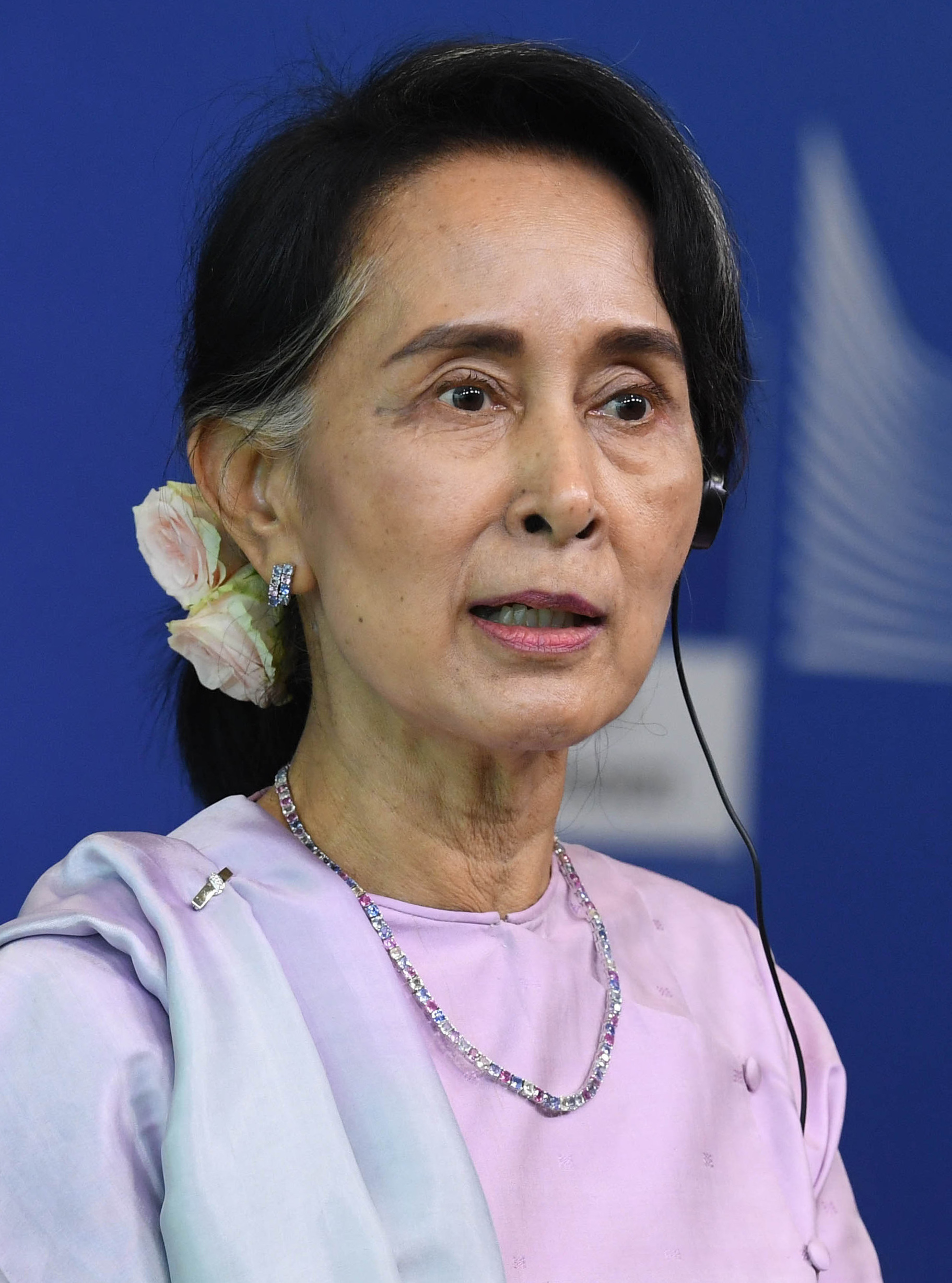

	First party	Second party
Leader	Aung San Suu Kyi	Than Htay
Party	NLD	USDP
Leader since	27 September 1988	23 August 2016
Leader's seat	Did not contest	Did not contest
Seats before	255 R / 135 N	30 R / 11 N
Seats after	254 R / 135 N	30 R / 11 N
Seat change	▼1 R / N	R / N
President before election
Htin Kyaw
NLD
President after election
Htin Kyaw
NLD

The 2017 Myanmar by-elections were held on 1 April 2017. The elections were held to fill 19 vacant parliamentary seats: nine in the Pyithu Hluttaw, three in the Amyotha Hluttaw, and seven in regional parliaments of Kayah State Hluttaw and Shan State Hluttaw. The seats were left by those who became government leaders or officials after the 2015 general election, or unable to be held due to instability at that time.

== Results ==
=== House of Nationalities ===
Chin Nº 3
Candidate	Party	Votes	%
Pu Bawi Khing	National League for Democracy	9,242	44.70
Pi Za Tlem	Chin National Democratic Party	6,482	31.35
Pu Zo Peng	Union Solidarity and Development Party	4,950	23.94
Total		20,674	100.00
Valid votes		20,674	97.87
Invalid/blank votes		450	2.13
Total votes		21,124	100.00
Registered voters/turnout		28,027	75.37
Source: UEC

Bago Nº 4
Candidate	Party	Votes	%
San San Myint	National League for Democracy	71,042	57.31
Htay Naing	Union Solidarity and Development Party	33,781	27.25
Aung Kyi Win	National Unity Party	9,183	7.41
Sein Tun	National Democratic Force	4,888	3.94
Min Tu	Union Farmer-Labor Force Party	2,550	2.06
Hla Moe	National Development Party	2,516	2.03
Total		123,960	100.00
Valid votes		123,960	95.95
Invalid/blank votes		5,227	4.05
Total votes		129,187	100.00
Registered voters/turnout		320,338	40.33
Source: UEC

Yangon Nº 6
Candidate	Party	Votes	%
Maung Maung	National League for Democracy	75,299	81.70
Khin Maung Aye	Union Solidarity and Development Party	10,813	11.73
Khin Maung Yee	National Democratic Force	4,597	4.99
Daw Nilar Yanphan	Independent	532	0.58
Thet Tun	National Development Party	505	0.55
Myint Kyi	Democratic Party	415	0.45
Total		92,161	100.00
Valid votes		92,161	98.80
Invalid/blank votes		1,118	1.20
Total votes		93,279	100.00
Registered voters/turnout		343,600	27.15
Source: UEC

=== House of Representatives ===
Monywa
Candidate	Party	Votes	%
Nyunt Aung	National League for Democracy	95,923	81.69
Win Myint Aung	Union Solidarity and Development Party	16,593	14.13
Sein Maung	National Unity Party	2,666	2.27
Nyun Hlaing	National Development Party	1,740	1.48
Than Thing Oo	People Democracy Party	506	0.43
Total		117,428	100.00
Valid votes		117,428	98.45
Invalid/blank votes		1,844	1.55
Total votes		119,272	100.00
Registered voters/turnout		250,040	47.70
Source: UEC

Chaungzon
Candidate	Party	Votes	%
Aung Kyi Thein	Union Solidarity and Development Party	19,667	41.70
Aye Win	National League for Democracy	12,636	26.79
Win Thut	All Mon Region Democracy Party	10,859	23.02
Tint Wei	National Unity Party	2,013	4.27
Nai Sein Mya Maung	Mon National Party	1,992	4.22
Total		47,167	100.00
Valid votes		47,167	97.18
Invalid/blank votes		1,368	2.82
Total votes		48,535	100.00
Registered voters/turnout		126,225	38.45
Source: UEC

Ann
Candidate	Party	Votes	%
Aye Maung	Arakan National Party	21,794	49.19
Thaung Nyein	Union Solidarity and Development Party	11,545	26.06
Zaw Win Myint	National League for Democracy	9,088	20.51
Zaw Lin Aung	Independent	1,877	4.24
Total		44,304	100.00
Valid votes		44,304	94.93
Invalid/blank votes		2,365	5.07
Total votes		46,669	100.00
Registered voters/turnout		76,086	61.34
Source: UEC

Hlaingthaya
Candidate	Party	Votes	%
Win Min	National League for Democracy	31,369	69.73
Tin Yu	Union Solidarity and Development Party	8,655	19.24
Aye Kyaw	Arakan National Party	1,551	3.45
Ne Lin Oo	Public Contribute Students Democracy Party	1,469	3.27
Kyar Kyi	Democratic Party	807	1.79
Thet Tun Maung	National Democratic Force	590	1.31
Maung Min	Independent	370	0.82
Kyaw Than	Independent	178	0.40
Total		44,989	100.00
Valid votes		44,989	96.92
Invalid/blank votes		1,429	3.08
Total votes		46,418	100.00
Registered voters/turnout		378,516	12.26
Source: UEC

East Dagon
Candidate	Party	Votes	%
Nay Kyaw	National League for Democracy	27,357	67.85
Ne Lin	Union Solidarity and Development Party	9,742	24.16
Khin Mala	National Democratic Force	1,772	4.39
Zaw Aung	New Society Party	1,001	2.48
Umar Tin	Democratic Party	448	1.11
Total		40,320	100.00
Valid votes		40,320	97.15
Invalid/blank votes		1,184	2.85
Total votes		41,504	100.00
Registered voters/turnout		99,631	41.66
Source: UEC

Dagon Seikkan
Candidate	Party	Votes	%
Mya Sein	National League for Democracy	15,756	62.35
Khin Win	Union Solidarity and Development Party	6,118	24.21
Aung Myo	Independent	2,112	8.36
Hin Maung Maung	National Development Party	799	3.16
Aung Zin	National Democratic Force	486	1.92
Total		25,271	100.00
Valid votes		25,271	96.27
Invalid/blank votes		979	3.73
Total votes		26,250	100.00
Registered voters/turnout		25,833	101.61
Source: UEC

Kawhmu
Candidate	Party	Votes	%
Kyaw Swe Win	National League for Democracy	38,028	69.97
Kyaw Zin Hein	Union Solidarity and Development Party	13,432	24.71
Nila Soe Tint	Myanmar National Congress	1,194	2.20
Khin Khin Lin	Myanmar Farmers Development Party	390	0.72
Myo Thiha Tun	Independent	381	0.70
Myo Maung Maung Soe	National Development Party	336	0.62
Sein Nengnu	Democratic Party	324	0.60
Zaw Tun	Independent	187	0.34
Saw Win	Phalon-Sawaw Democratic Party	76	0.14
Total		54,348	100.00
Valid votes		54,348	96.81
Invalid/blank votes		1,793	3.19
Total votes		56,141	100.00
Registered voters/turnout		94,698	59.28
Source: UEC

Kyethi
Candidate	Party	Votes	%
Saing Aung Kyaw	Shan Nationalities League for Democracy	18,882	77.00
Sai Kyaw Khaing	Union Solidarity and Development Party	3,235	13.19
Sai Om Kham	National League for Democracy	1,668	6.80
Nan Tin Oo	Shan Nationalities Democratic Party	736	3.00
Total		24,521	100.00
Valid votes		24,521	90.52
Invalid/blank votes		2,569	9.48
Total votes		27,090	100.00
Registered voters/turnout		53,451	50.68
Source: UEC

Mong Hsu
Candidate	Party	Votes	%
Saing Win Aye	Shan Nationalities League for Democracy	10,216	57.53
Kyaw Tin Shwe	Union Solidarity and Development Party	3,484	19.62
Win Naing	National League for Democracy	3,190	17.96
Nang Kham Yen Aung	Shan Nationalities Democratic Party	868	4.89
Total		17,758	100.00
Valid votes		17,758	84.13
Invalid/blank votes		3,351	15.87
Total votes		21,109	100.00
Registered voters/turnout		43,964	48.01
Source: UEC

=== State and Regional Hluttaws ===
Party	Votes	Votes %	Seats Won	Seats %	Change	Seats Before	Seats After
Shan Nationalities League for Democracy	33,288		4	57.13%	▲4	25	29
Union Solidarity and Development Party	26,873		1	14.29%	Steady	73	73
National League for Democracy	26,332		1	14.29%	▼1	476	475
Lahu National Development Party	3,885						
All Nationals' Democracy Party	3,351		1	14.29%	▲1	0	1
Inn National Development Party	3,199						
Shan Nationalities Democratic Party	2,958						
Akha National Development Party	2,046						
National Development Party	511						
Wa Liberal Democratic Development Party	186						
Military	Unelected					220	220
Vacant					4	14	10
Total		100	7	100		864	864

=== Results By Constituency ===
Constituency	State/Region	House	Party Before	Party After	Incumbent MP	Reason for Vacancy	Elected MP
Yangon 6	Yangon	Nationalities	National League for Democracy	National League for Democracy	Aung Thu	Selected as Cabinet Minister	Maung Maung
Bago 4	Bago	Nationalities	National League for Democracy	National League for Democracy	Win Myat Aye	Selected as Cabinet Minister	San San Myint
Chin 3	Chin	Nationalities	National League for Democracy	National League for Democracy	Henry Van Thio	Elected as Second Vice President	Pu Bawi Khing
Kawhmu	Yangon	Representatives	National League for Democracy	National League for Democracy	Aung San Suu Kyi	Selected as State Counsellor	Kyaw Swe Win
Dagon Seikkan	Yangon	Representatives	National League for Democracy	National League for Democracy	Kyaw Win	Selected as Cabinet Minister	Mya Sein
Hlaingtharyar	Yangon	Representatives	National League for Democracy	National League for Democracy	Than Myint	Selected as Cabinet Minister	Win Min
East Dagon	Yangon	Representatives	National League for Democracy	National League for Democracy	Myo Aung	Appointed Head of Naypyidaw Council	Nay Kyaw
Ann	Rakhine	Representatives	Union Solidarity Development Party	Arakan National Party	Thein Swe	Selected as Cabinet Minister	Aye Maung
Chaungzon	Mon	Representatives	National League for Democracy	Union Solidarity and Development Party	Khin Htay Kywe	Joined the Constitutional Tribunal	Aung Kyi Thein
Monywa	Sagaing	Representatives	National League for Democracy	National League for Democracy	Thant Sin Maung	Selected as Cabinet Minister	Nyunt Aung
Kyethi	Shan	Representatives	No party elected	Shan Nationalities League for Democracy	No Incumbents	Elections in 2015 cancelled due to ethnic violence	Saing Aung Kyaw
Monghsu	Shan	Representatives	No party elected	Shan Nationalities League for Democracy	No Incumbents	Elections in 2015 cancelled due to ethnic violence	Saing Win Aye
Kyethi 1	Shan	State/Region	No party elected	Shan Nationalities League for Democracy	No Incumbents	Elections in 2015 cancelled due to ethnic violence	Saing San Maing
Kyethi 2	Shan	State/Region	No party elected	Shan Nationalities League for Democracy	No Incumbents	Elections in 2015 cancelled due to ethnic violence	Khin Maung Nyunt
Monghsu 1	Shan	State/Region	No party elected	Shan Nationalities League for Democracy	No Incumbents	Elections in 2015 cancelled due to ethnic violence	Saing Linn Myat
Monghsu 2	Shan	State/Region	No party elected	Shan Nationalities League for Democracy	No Incumbents	Elections in 2015 cancelled due to ethnic violence	Nam Kaung Kham
Nyaungshwe 1	Shan	State/Region	National League for Democracy	National League for Democracy	Tin Yin	Died before election on October 12, 2016	Khin Maung Win
Kengtung 2	Shan	State/Region	Union Solidarity Development Party	Union Solidarity and Development Party	Peter Thaung Sein		Shar Mwe La Shang
Hpruso 1	Kayah	State/Region	National League for Democracy	All Nationals' Democracy Party (Kayah State)	Thoe Ral		The' Reh
