= Thein Soe =

Burmese military general (born 1952)

- သိန်းစိုး
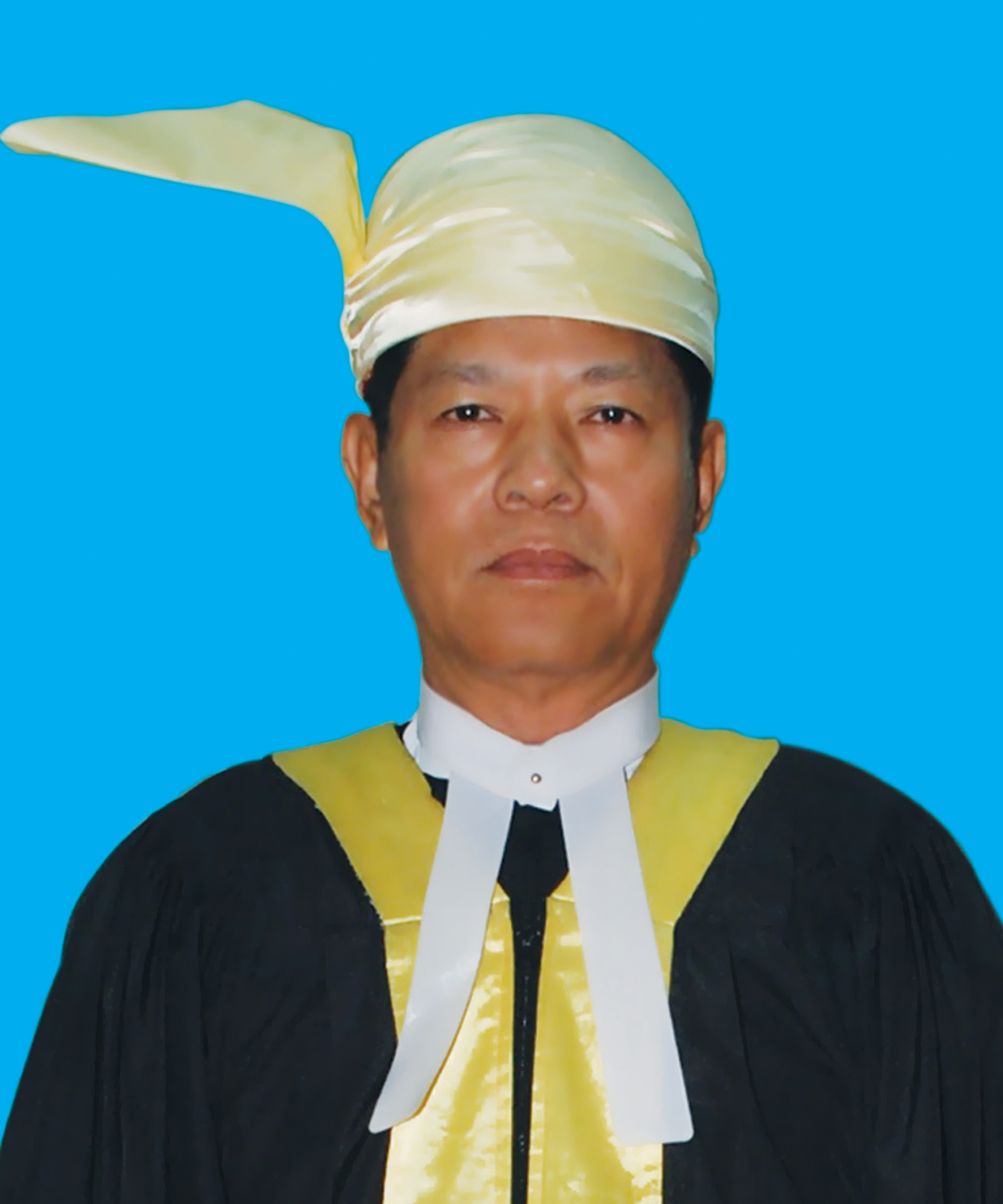

Chairman of the Union Election Commission
- Incumbent
- Assumed office 2 February 2021
- Preceded by: Hla Thein
- In office 8 March 2010 – 30 March 2011
- Preceded by: None, office established
- Succeeded by: Tin Aye

Chairman of the Constitutional Tribunal of Myanmar
- In office 30 March 2011 – September 2012

Personal details
- Born: 23 January 1952 (age 74) Kani, Sagaing Division, Burma
- Parents: Ba Thu (father); Tin Aye (mother)
- Education: Defence Services Academy

Military service
- Allegiance: Myanmar
- Years of service: 1974–?
- Rank: Major general

Thein Soe (Burmese: သိန်းစိုး; born 23 January 1952) is a former major general in the Myanmar Armed Forces and the incumbent chairman of the Union Election Commission.

== Early life and education ==
Thein Soe was born on 23 January 1952 in the town of Kani, Sagaing Division, Burma (now Myanmar), to Ba Thu and Tin Aye.

== Career ==
He graduated from the 16th intake of the Defence Services Academy (DSA) and re-enlisted on 31 December 1974. He served in various ranks as an army officer, rising to the rank of major-general, serving as a military judge advocate-general, and later as deputy chief justice of the Supreme Court. He was also a member of the commission that drafted the 2008 Constitution.

Thein Soe was appointed as the inaugural chairman of the Union Election Commission (UEC) on 8 March 2010. He courted significant controversy during his term as chairman, for barring international media and foreign observers from covering the 2010 Myanmar general election, the country's first election in 20 years since the 1990 Myanmar general election. The National League for Democracy and other pro-democracy parties ultimately boycotted the election, citing unfair electoral laws and oversight. Under Thein Soe's leadership, the UEC approved the political party registration for the pro-military Union Solidarity and Development Party (USDP), despite USDP's violation of electoral laws which bar civil servants and state resources from being involved in party politics. In February 2011, he stepped down from the UEC, after receiving a promotion as chairman of the Constitutional Tribunal of Myanmar. He resigned from that post in September 2012.

Following the 2021 Myanmar coup d'état, the State Administrative Council, the military regime, re-appointed Thein Soe to chair the UEC on 2 February 2021.

== Sanctions ==
On 31 January 2022, the United Kingdom imposed sanctions against Soe and two other individuals in Myanmar "for their involvement in undermining democracy and the rule of law" and being "responsible for disregarding the Myanmar election results in November 2020 and supporting unsubstantiated claims of electoral fraud in an attempt to legitimise the coup."

== See also ==
- Union Election Commission
