= 2012 Myanmar by-elections =

2012 Myanmar by-election
- 1 April 2012

40 (of the 440) seats to the Pyithu Hluttaw (House of Representatives) 6 (of the 224) seats to the Amyotha Hluttaw (House of Nationalities) 2 seats to Regional Parliaments
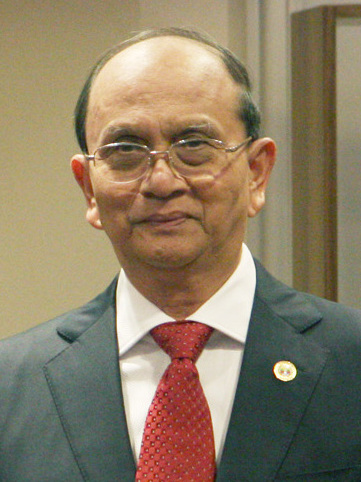

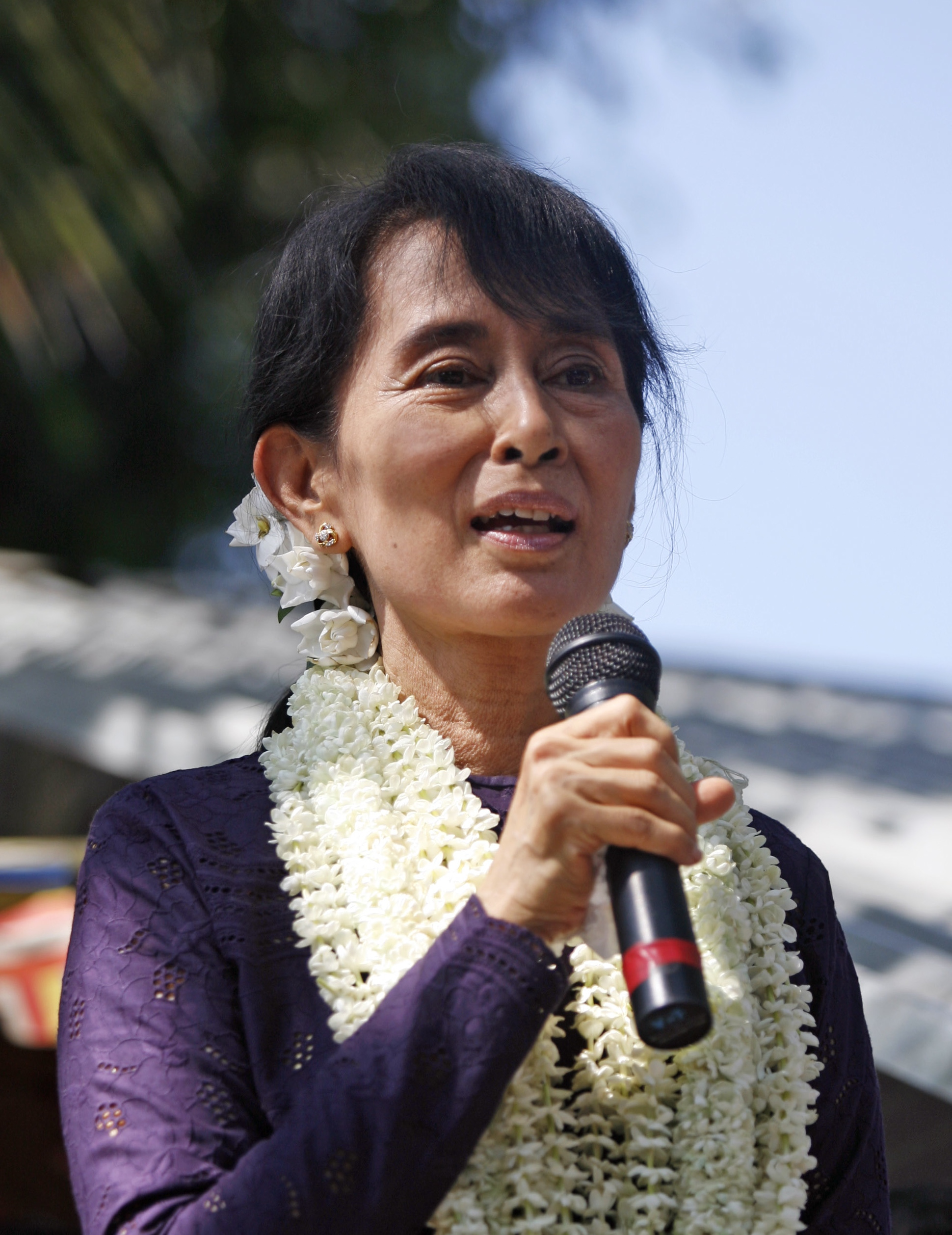

	First party	Second party	Third party
Leader	Thein Sein	Aung San Suu Kyi	Sai Ai Pao
Party	USDP	NLD	SNDP
Leader since	2 June 2010	27 September 1988	8 April 2010
Leader's seat	Did not contest	Kawhmu (Pyithu)	Did not contest
Seats before	260 R / 128 N	0 R / 1 N	18 R / 3 N
Seats after	220 R / 123 N	37 R / 5 N	18 R / 4 N
Seat change	▼40 R / ▼5 N	▲37 R / ▲4 N	R / ▲1 N
- Results of the election in the Pyithu Hluttaw and Amyotha Hluttaw in the 2010 General Election and by-elections up to December 2014.

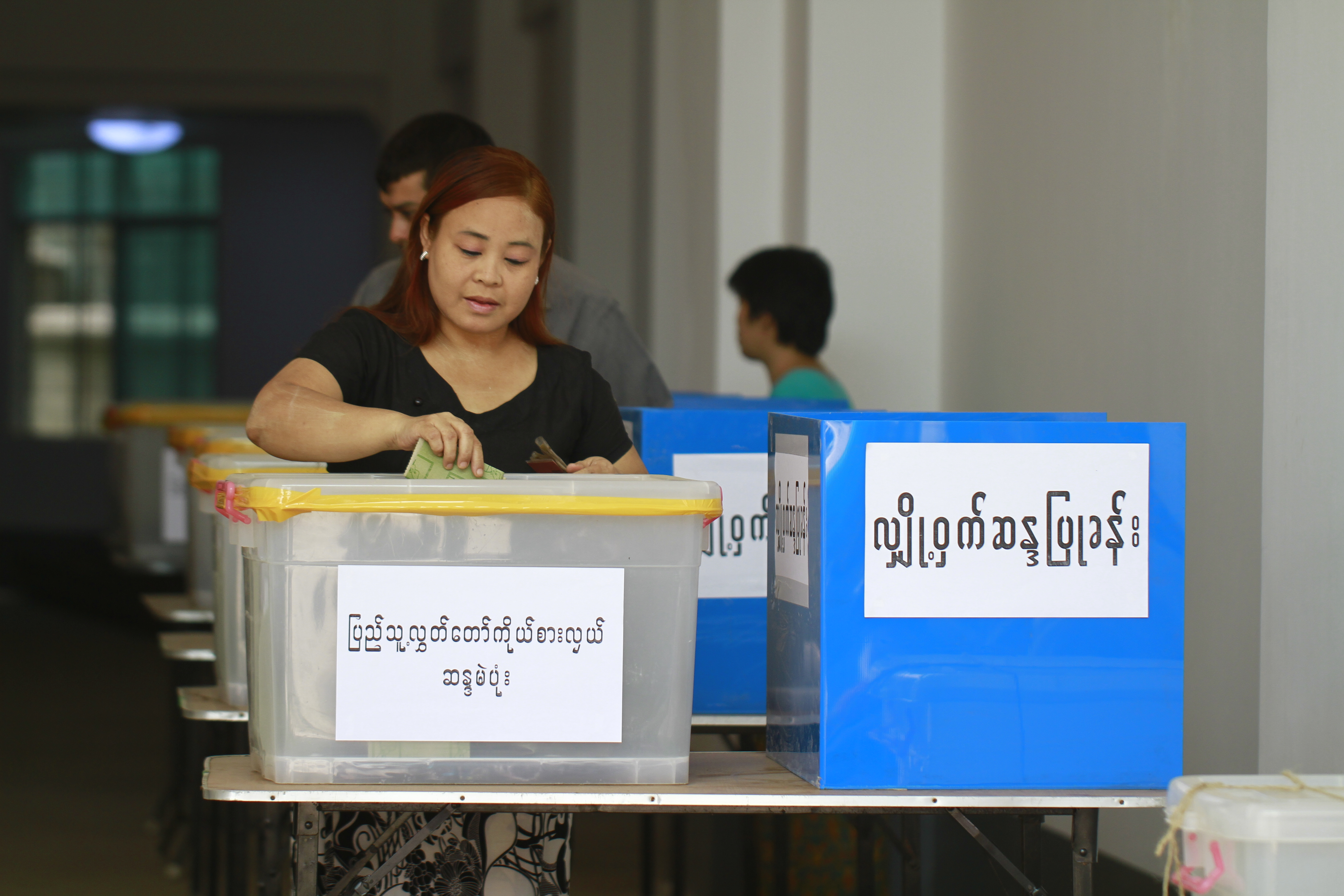
A woman places her ballot into the Pyithu Hluttaw representative election box in the April by-elections.

The 2012 Myanmar by-elections were held on 1 April 2012. The elections were held to fill 48 vacant parliamentary seats. Three of those remained vacant as polling in three Kachin constituencies was postponed. There was no plan to fill the additional five seats cancelled in the 2010 election and one seat vacated after the death of a RNDP member.

The main opposition party National League for Democracy was re-registered for the by-elections on 13 December 2011 as part of the reforms in Burma since 2010. It won in 43 of the 44 seats they contested (out of 45 available). Its leader Aung San Suu Kyi ran for the seat of Kawhmu, and won.

== Changes during the term of office ==
=== House of Representatives ===
- 9 September 2011: Tun Aung Khaing (USDP) replaced Aung Kyaw Zan (RNDP) who had been removed from office.
- 1 March 2012: Aung Sein Tha (RNDP, Arakan State's Minbya constituency) died in office and was not replaced.

=== House of Nationalities ===
- 28 January 2012: Bogyi a.k.a. Aung Ngwe (USDP, Sagaing Division constituency 2) died in office and was not replaced.
- 2012: Phone Myint Aung (Rangoon Division constituency 3) left the NDF to join the NNDP.
- 5 February 2013: Tin Shwe (NDF, Rangoon Division constituency 6) resigned from his seat to become a Hotels and Tourism Deputy Minister and was not replaced.
- 2013: Maung Sa Pru (RNDP, Arakan State constituency 4) died in office and was not replaced.

== Election observers ==
In February 2012, President Thein Sein remarked that the government would "seriously consider" allowing Southeast Asian observers from the Association of South East Asian Nations to observe the election. The Burmese government confirmed that it had requested for ASEAN election observers to arrive on 28 March, five days before the election. Canada, United States, European Union, China, and North Korea, as well as ASEAN dialogue partners (India, Japan, New Zealand, South Korea, Russia and Australia), were also invited to observe the election, although it remained unclear the degree of access these international observers were to have. The United States sent two election observers and three journalists.

On 13 March 2012, the Union Election Commission approved political party monitors to monitor polling stations during the election. In the previous election, only Union Solidarity and Development Party monitors had been allowed to observe the elections and ballot counts. A civilian-led monitoring group, including members of the 88 Generation Students Group, also scrutinised election irregularities.

On 28 March 2012, Canada's Department of Foreign Affairs and International Trade sent a delegation consisting of Senator Consiglio Di Nino and Parliamentary Secretary to the Minister of Foreign Affairs Deepak Obhrai.

== Pre-election controversies ==
Aung Din of the US Campaign for Burma said that the Burmese government was exploiting the elections to have international economic sanctions lifted as quickly as possible, since a free and transparent election had been one of the conditions set by the European Union and American governments. Moreover, the National League for Democracy has pointed out irregularities in voter lists and rule violations by local election committees. On 21 March 2012, Aung San Suu Kyi was quoted as saying "Fraud and rule violations are continuing and we can even say they are increasing."

With regard to the invitations of international election observers, a US State Department spokesperson said that the Burmese government fell short of expectations to accommodate observers during the entirety of the campaign season (as typically done), which is nearing the end, as a select number of observers were allowed only to observe the election:

"...it does fall short of international complete transparency on an election, and we hope they’ll continue to keep the system open, and open it further... A full-scale international observation effort would typically include quite a bit of pre-Election Day observation, systematic coverage on Election Day, post-election follow-up, and professional monitors from non-governmental organisations."

Asian Network for Free Elections (ANFREL), a Bangkok-based election monitoring organisation, has publicly called the election observations inadequate, failing to meet international standards, being too restrictive (only two observers are allowed per government, or five for ASEAN nations), and coming too late (invitations were sent less than two weeks before the election date), all of which make it logistically impossible to monitor all 48 polling stations. On 20 March 2012, Somsri Hananuntasuk, executive director of ANFREL, was deported from Yangon, purportedly for entering the country on a tourist visa.

On 23 March 2012, the three by-elections in Kachin State, namely in the constituencies of Mogaung, Hpakant and Bhamo Townships, were postponed due to the security situation there.

Two days before the by-elections, at press conference, Suu Kyi remarked that the voter irregularities were "beyond what is acceptable for democratic elections," said she did not consider the campaign "genuinely free and fair" and referred to acts of intimidation (such as stone-throwing incidents and vandalism) toward party members. On 1 April, the opposition National League for Democracy alleged irregularities, claiming that ballot sheets had been tampered to allow the election commission to cancel the vote for Suu Kyi's party.

Two Australian MPs (Janelle Saffin and Mathias Cormann), who were selected to observe the by-elections as part of Australia's monitoring team, were denied visas to enter the country.

== Aftermath ==
Much of the international reaction on the by-elections revolved around the sanctions imposed by Western countries (including the United States, Australia, and the European Union). President Thein Sein and the Burmese government were eager to work with Aung San Suu Kyi to remove these measures.

President Thein Sein remarked that the by-elections were conducted "in a very successful manner."

The Union Solidarity and Development Party said it would lodge official complaints to the Union Election Commission on poll irregularities, voter intimidation, and purported campaign incidents that involved National League for Democracy members and supporters. The National League for Democracy also sent an official complaint to the commission, regarding ballots that it claimed had been tampered with wax.

In response to the by-elections, a Chinese Ministry of Foreign Affairs spokesman said:

China has noted that some Western countries have said they will lift sanctions on Myanmar. China has had a consistent stance on this issue. We welcome moves by these countries to lift sanctions on Myanmar and call on all parties to fully lift sanctions on Myanmar as soon as possible.

ASEAN leaders, including those from Cambodia, Malaysia, and Indonesia, called for the immediate removal of sanctions. Singapore's Prime Minister said the following: "President Thein Sein has been much bolder than many observers have expected. ASEAN is happy that Myanmar has been able to take these steps forward." Australia's foreign minister, Bob Carr, said the Australian government was planning to loosen sanctions, but not abolish them altogether.

US Senator John McCain, who had met with Aung San Suu Kyi in January 2012, said:

We should now work with our many international partners to begin the process of easing sanctions on Burma. This will be a gradual and incremental process, and the U.S. Congress will have a critical role to play.

On 4 April 2012, the Obama administration announced that it would nominate an ambassador to the country and ease some travel and finance restrictions, without specifying a time table. Secretary of State Hillary Clinton said of the elections:

The results of the April 1st parliamentary by-elections represents a dramatic demonstration of popular will that brings a new generation of reformers into government. This is an important step in the country’s transformation, which in recent months has seen the unprecedented release of political prisoners, new legislation broadening the rights of political and civic association, and fledgling process in internal dialogue between the government and ethnic minority groups.

To normalise diplomatic relations between the countries, she also said that following the nomination of an ambassador, the US would establish USAID mission in Burma, ease restrictions on export of finance services and developmental assistance and facilitate travel for some government officials, although targeted sanctions toward "individuals and institutions that remain on the wrong side of these historic reform efforts" would remain in place. A few sanctions (in the financial, agriculture, tourism and telecommunications sectors), are directly controlled by the executive branch, but most of the imposed sanctions were legislated by Congress, and were to take a lengthy process to remove. On 6 April 2012, the Obama administration nominated Derek Mitchell, who was then serving as the American special envoy to Burma, as United States Ambassador to Burma.

The European Union, which had already eased some sanctions and travel restrictions (including on Thein Sein), agreed to review travel bans and asset freezes on individuals tied to the previous ruling junta, the State Peace and Development Council on 23 April 2012. UK Foreign Secretary William Hague suggested that easing of restrictions would be contingent on the release of political prisoners and further progress.

Other scholars noted that the by-elections, which were a relatively minor event, given the number of seats at stake, were not as defining and important as other steps toward national reconciliation. Some called removal of sanctions premature, while others considered sanctions ineffective in the reform process.

== Results ==
=== House of Nationalities ===
Six of the 224 seats in the Amyotha Hluttaw (House of Nationalities) were up for election. A by-election was not held in one remaining vacant seat, with this seat instead continuing to remain vacant until the 2015 General Election.

Party	Votes	Votes %	Seats Won	Seats %	Change	Seats Before	Seats After
National League for Democracy			4	66.6	▲4	1 (Note: In December 2011, Myat Nyana Soe (Rangoon Region constituency No. 4) left NDF and joined NLD.)	5
Union Solidarity and Development Party			1	16.7	▼5	128 (Note: On 28 January 2012, Bogyi a.k.a. Aung Ngwe (USDP, Sagaing Division constituency 2) deceased and was not replaced.)	123
National Unity Party			0	0	Steady		
Kokang Democracy and Unity Party			0	0	Steady		
Lahu National Development Party			0	0	Steady		
Shan Nationalities Democratic Party			1	16.7	▲1	3	4
Unity and Peace Party			0	0	Steady		
Vacant			0	0	Steady	1	1
Total		100	6	100		224	224
Source: ALTSEAN Burma

=== House of Representatives ===
37 of the 440 seats in the Pyithu Hluttaw (House of Representatives) were up for election. By-elections were not held in seven remaining vacant seats, with these seats instead continuing to remain vacant until the 2015 General Election.

House of Representatives by-elections, 2012
Party	Seats	Gains	Losses	Net gain/loss	Seats %	Votes %	Votes	+/−
NLD	37	▲37	Steady	▲37	92.5			
USDP	0	Steady	▼40	▼40	0			
NUP	0	Steady	Steady	Steady	0			
NDF	0	Steady	Steady	Steady	0			
NNDP	0	Steady	Steady	Steady	0			
MNC	0	Steady	Steady	Steady	0			
AMRDP	0	Steady	Steady	Steady	0			
DP	0	Steady	Steady	Steady	0			
PNO	0	Steady	Steady	Steady	0			
UMFNP	0	Steady	Steady	Steady	0			
MPP	0	Steady	Steady	Steady	0			
Independent	0	Steady	Steady	Steady	0			
Vacant due to postponement	3	▲3	Steady	▲3	7.5			
Total	40				100	100		
Source: ALTSEAN Burma

=== State and Regional Hluttaws ===
2 of the 860 seats in the State and Regional Hluttaws were up for election.

Regional Parliaments by-elections, 2012
Party	Seats	Gains	Losses	Net gain/loss	Seats %	Votes %	Votes	+/−
NLD	2	▲2	Steady	▲2	100			
USDP	0	Steady	▼2	▼2	0			
Total	2				100			

== By Constituency ==
=== House of Nationalities (Amyotha Hluttaw) ===
Sagaing № 3
Candidate	Party	Votes	%
Myint Naing	National League for Democracy	169,727	69.72
Tin Maung Win	Union Solidarity and Development Party	55,771	22.91
Bo Myint Aung	National Unity Party	13,898	5.71
U Hla San	Shan Nationalities Democratic Party	4,053	1.66
Total		243,449	100.00
Valid votes		243,449	91.68
Invalid/blank votes		22,106	8.32
Total votes		265,555	100.00
Registered voters/turnout		424,206	62.60
Source: UEC

Sagaing № 7
Candidate	Party	Votes	%
Tin Mya	Union Solidarity and Development Party	70,481	51.10
Chit Han	National Unity Party	39,285	28.48
Mar Kyin	Shan Nationalities Democratic Party	28,167	20.42
Total		137,933	100.00
Valid votes		137,933	90.91
Invalid/blank votes		13,787	9.09
Total votes		151,720	100.00
Registered voters/turnout		146,502	103.56
Source: UEC

Bago № 7
Candidate	Party	Votes	%
Min Oo	National League for Democracy	81,867	75.11
Than Than Nwe	Union Solidarity and Development Party	27,124	24.89
Total		108,991	100.00
Valid votes		108,991	93.17
Invalid/blank votes		7,986	6.83
Total votes		116,977	100.00
Registered voters/turnout		177,378	65.95
Source: UEC

Magway № 4
Candidate	Party	Votes	%
Aung Kyi Nyunt	National League for Democracy	76,767	65.57
Maung Maung Win	Union Solidarity and Development Party	33,389	28.52
Maung Win (Aung Win)	National Unity Party	5,404	4.62
Aung Than Tin	Unity and Peace Party	1,508	1.29
Total		117,068	100.00
Valid votes		117,068	91.98
Invalid/blank votes		10,208	8.02
Total votes		127,276	100.00
Registered voters/turnout		174,679	72.86
Source: UEC

Shan № 3
Candidate	Party	Votes	%
Sai Sam Min	Shan Nationalities Democratic Party	47,420	29.08
Sai Myint Maung	National League for Democracy	45,722	28.03
Nang Keng Phawng Tip	Union Solidarity and Development Party	45,711	28.03
Luo Xingguang (Law Shin Kwan)	Kokang Democracy and Unity Party	17,889	10.97
Yaw Thup	Lahu National Development Party	6,350	3.89
Total		163,092	100.00
Valid votes		163,092	91.30
Invalid/blank votes		15,532	8.70
Total votes		178,624	100.00
Registered voters/turnout		299,755	59.59
Source: UEC

Ayeyarwady № 10
Candidate	Party	Votes	%
Thein Swe	National League for Democracy	136,413	68.61
Aye Kyaing	Union Solidarity and Development Party	49,650	24.97
Mahn Thein Hla	National Unity Party	8,728	4.39
U Kyaw Lin	Modern People's Party	4,024	2.02
Total		198,815	100.00
Valid votes		198,815	92.71
Invalid/blank votes		15,644	7.29
Total votes		214,459	100.00
Registered voters/turnout		339,632	63.14
Source: UEC

=== House of Representatives (Pyithu Hluttaw) ===
Sagaing
Candidate	Party	Votes	%
Khin Maung Thein	National League for Democracy	95,369	76.52
Soe Naing	Union Solidarity and Development Party	29,266	23.48
Total		124,635	100.00
Valid votes		124,635	93.14
Invalid/blank votes		9,176	6.86
Total votes		133,811	100.00
Registered voters/turnout		201,502	66.41
Source: UEC

Pale
Candidate	Party	Votes	%
Khin San Hlaing	National League for Democracy	43,946	67.70
Htay Naing	Union Solidarity and Development Party	20,133	31.02
Hein Htet Aung	People's Democracy Party	831	1.28
Total		64,910	100.00
Valid votes		64,910	92.45
Invalid/blank votes		5,298	7.55
Total votes		70,208	100.00
Registered voters/turnout		93,360	75.20
Source: UEC

Mingin
Candidate	Party	Votes	%
Khin Hmway Lwin	National League for Democracy	27,982	56.43
San Win	Union Solidarity and Development Party	19,779	39.89
Htay Aung	National Unity Party	1,828	3.69
Total		49,589	100.00
Valid votes		49,589	93.94
Invalid/blank votes		3,199	6.06
Total votes		52,788	100.00
Registered voters/turnout		67,106	78.66
Source: UEC

Kyunsu
Candidate	Party	Votes	%
Tin Tin Yi	National League for Democracy	35,965	69.95
Chit Than	Union Solidarity and Development Party	15,448	30.05
Total		51,413	100.00
Valid votes		51,413	90.10
Invalid/blank votes		5,647	9.90
Total votes		57,060	100.00
Registered voters/turnout		75,798	75.28
Source: UEC

Launglon
Candidate	Party	Votes	%
Aung Soe	National League for Democracy	36,865	82.24
Sein Maung	Union Solidarity and Development Party	7,961	17.76
Total		44,826	100.00
Valid votes		44,826	92.96
Invalid/blank votes		3,393	7.04
Total votes		48,219	100.00
Registered voters/turnout		57,034	84.54
Source: UEC

Taungoo
Candidate	Party	Votes	%
Aung Soe Myint	National League for Democracy	78,956	72.38
Wai Wai Tha	Union Solidarity and Development Party	26,908	24.67
Win Tun	National Democratic Force	3,218	2.95
Total		109,082	100.00
Valid votes		109,082	93.83
Invalid/blank votes		7,171	6.17
Total votes		116,253	100.00
Registered voters/turnout		164,477	70.68
Source: UEC

Htantabin, Bago
Candidate	Party	Votes	%
Sein Htun	National League for Democracy	30,387	68.12
Kyaw Kyaw Oo	Union Solidarity and Development Party	10,964	24.58
Tin Win	National Unity Party	2,516	5.64
Thet Oo	Unity and Peace Party	744	1.67
Total		44,611	100.00
Valid votes		44,611	92.60
Invalid/blank votes		3,563	7.40
Total votes		48,174	100.00
Registered voters/turnout		71,827	67.07
Source: UEC

Letpadan
Candidate	Party	Votes	%
Kyaw Min	National League for Democracy	54,527	80.23
Aung Thein	Union Solidarity and Development Party	9,425	13.87
Win Hlaing	National Unity Party	2,627	3.87
Nan Kyu Than Win	National Democratic Force	1,388	2.04
Total		67,967	100.00
Valid votes		67,967	92.10
Invalid/blank votes		5,833	7.90
Total votes		73,800	100.00
Registered voters/turnout		118,812	62.11
Source: UEC

Thanatpin
Candidate	Party	Votes	%
Myint Oo	National League for Democracy	36,416	76.63
Sein Htoo	Union Solidarity and Development Party	9,114	19.18
Than Hlaing	National Unity Party	1,991	4.19
Total		47,521	100.00
Valid votes		47,521	91.74
Invalid/blank votes		4,280	8.26
Total votes		51,801	100.00
Registered voters/turnout		94,554	54.78
Source: UEC

Pakokku
Candidate	Party	Votes	%
Paik Ko	National League for Democracy	108,681	78.02
Kyaw Tint	Union Solidarity and Development Party	30,612	21.98
Total		139,293	100.00
Valid votes		139,293	92.33
Invalid/blank votes		11,564	7.67
Total votes		150,857	100.00
Registered voters/turnout		193,375	78.01
Source: UEC

Pwintbyu
Candidate	Party	Votes	%
Aung Myo Nyo	National League for Democracy	55,336	69.87
Tint Lwin	Union Solidarity and Development Party	20,869	26.35
Kyaw Ma Soe	League of National Political Alliances	1,538	1.94
Tint Lwin	National Unity Party	1,458	1.84
Total		79,201	100.00
Valid votes		79,201	93.04
Invalid/blank votes		5,926	6.96
Total votes		85,127	100.00
Registered voters/turnout		113,053	75.30
Source: UEC

Magway
Candidate	Party	Votes	%
Myint Thein	National League for Democracy	95,885	72.59
Aung Thein Kyaw	Union Solidarity and Development Party	29,815	22.57
Hla Myint	National Unity Party	3,827	2.90
Kyaw Sein Han	National Democratic Force	2,570	1.95
Total		132,097	100.00
Valid votes		132,097	94.44
Invalid/blank votes		7,775	5.56
Total votes		139,872	100.00
Registered voters/turnout		179,358	77.98
Source: UEC

Myaing
Candidate	Party	Votes	%
Myint Aung	National League for Democracy	75,065	74.70
Kyaw Myint Than	Union Solidarity and Development Party	25,428	25.30
Total		100,493	100.00
Valid votes		100,493	92.45
Invalid/blank votes		8,212	7.55
Total votes		108,705	100.00
Registered voters/turnout		158,080	68.77
Source: UEC

Yesagyo
Candidate	Party	Votes	%
Tin Htay Aung	National League for Democracy	71,352	68.38
Bo Win	Union Solidarity and Development Party	29,833	28.59
Han Shin Win	Independent	3,162	3.03
Total		104,347	100.00
Valid votes		104,347	92.00
Invalid/blank votes		9,070	8.00
Total votes		113,417	100.00
Registered voters/turnout		143,551	79.01
Source: UEC

Zabuthiri
Candidate	Party	Votes	%
Sanda Min	National League for Democracy	23,285	56.68
Win Htay	Union Solidarity and Development Party	17,796	43.32
Total		41,081	100.00
Valid votes		41,081	96.16
Invalid/blank votes		1,641	3.84
Total votes		42,722	100.00
Registered voters/turnout		53,261	80.21
Source: UEC

Dekkhinathiri
Candidate	Party	Votes	%
Naing Ngan Lin	National League for Democracy	7,491	63.83
Maung Shein	Union Solidarity and Development Party	4,245	36.17
Total		11,736	100.00
Valid votes		11,736	92.37
Invalid/blank votes		969	7.63
Total votes		12,705	100.00
Registered voters/turnout		16,931	75.04
Source: UEC

Pobbathiri
Candidate	Party	Votes	%
Phyo Zeya Thaw	National League for Democracy	23,651	54.52
Tha Htay	Union Solidarity and Development Party	19,170	44.19
Lwin Myint Than	Independent	557	1.28
Total		43,378	100.00
Valid votes		43,378	92.94
Invalid/blank votes		3,293	7.06
Total votes		46,671	100.00
Registered voters/turnout		56,941	81.96
Source: UEC

Ottarathiri
Candidate	Party	Votes	%
Min Thu	National League for Democracy	15,178	59.49
Hla Thein Swe	Union Solidarity and Development Party	9,092	35.64
Kyi Myint	National Unity Party	1,242	4.87
Total		25,512	100.00
Valid votes		25,512	92.16
Invalid/blank votes		2,171	7.84
Total votes		27,683	100.00
Registered voters/turnout		37,935	72.97
Source: UEC

Tada-U
Candidate	Party	Votes	%
Khin Thanda	National League for Democracy	37,337	62.75
Aung Mon	Union Solidarity and Development Party	20,487	34.43
Nan Htaik Zaw	National Democratic Force	1,105	1.86
San Htun	Unity and Peace Party	569	0.96
Total		59,498	100.00
Valid votes		59,498	89.97
Invalid/blank votes		6,633	10.03
Total votes		66,131	100.00
Registered voters/turnout		93,634	70.63
Source: UEC

Kyaukpadaung
Candidate	Party	Votes	%
Zaw Myint Maung	National League for Democracy	85,910	71.61
Aung Win Kyi	Union Solidarity and Development Party	34,053	28.39
Total		119,963	100.00
Valid votes		119,963	91.86
Invalid/blank votes		10,631	8.14
Total votes		130,594	100.00
Registered voters/turnout		206,007	63.39
Source: UEC

Natogyi
Candidate	Party	Votes	%
Paw Khin	National League for Democracy	44,703	64.00
Soe Naing Win	Union Solidarity and Development Party	23,452	33.57
Aung Than	National Unity Party	1,695	2.43
Total		69,850	100.00
Valid votes		69,850	89.78
Invalid/blank votes		7,954	10.22
Total votes		77,804	100.00
Registered voters/turnout		141,010	55.18
Source: UEC

Maha Aungmye
Candidate	Party	Votes	%
Ohn Kyaing	National League for Democracy	78,436	89.54
Than Htun	Union Solidarity and Development Party	6,785	7.75
Tun Kyi	National Unity Party	1,171	1.34
Than Thing Oo	People's Democracy Party	428	0.49
Hla Ko	National Democratic Force	405	0.46
Sein Hla	Independent	191	0.22
Nyunt Oo	Independent	106	0.12
Kyaw Kyaw	Independent	76	0.09
Total		87,598	100.00
Valid votes		87,598	95.33
Invalid/blank votes		4,294	4.67
Total votes		91,892	100.00
Registered voters/turnout		131,567	69.84
Source: UEC

Meiktila
Candidate	Party	Votes	%
Win Htein	National League for Democracy	62,098	52.10
Hla Myint	Union Solidarity and Development Party	48,067	40.33
Myint Myint Aye	Independent	6,378	5.35
Win Zan	Union of Myanmar Federation of National Politics	2,650	2.22
Total		119,193	100.00
Valid votes		119,193	89.61
Invalid/blank votes		13,814	10.39
Total votes		133,007	100.00
Registered voters/turnout		207,400	64.13
Source: UEC

Pyinoolwin
Candidate	Party	Votes	%
Kyaw Thiha	National League for Democracy	54,327	61.40
Khin Maung Win	Union Solidarity and Development Party	34,151	38.60
Total		88,478	100.00
Valid votes		88,478	93.78
Invalid/blank votes		5,870	6.22
Total votes		94,348	100.00
Registered voters/turnout		133,805	70.51
Source: UEC

Mawlamyine
Candidate	Party	Votes	%
Khin Htay Kywe	National League for Democracy	71,480	72.91
Tin Soe Moe Naing	Union Solidarity and Development Party	19,648	20.04
Myint Myint Wai	All Mon Region Democracy Party	4,824	4.92
Aung Than Oo	National Unity Party	2,082	2.12
Total		98,034	100.00
Valid votes		98,034	94.27
Invalid/blank votes		5,964	5.73
Total votes		103,998	100.00
Registered voters/turnout		101,735	102.22
Source: UEC

Kawhmu
Candidate	Party	Votes	%
Aung San Suu Kyi	National League for Democracy	55,902	85.38
Soe Min	Union Solidarity and Development Party	9,172	14.01
Tin Yi	Unity and Peace Party	397	0.61
Total		65,471	100.00
Valid votes		65,471	96.18
Invalid/blank votes		2,599	3.82
Total votes		68,070	100.00
Registered voters/turnout		87,716	77.60
Source: UEC

Dagon Seikkan
Candidate	Party	Votes	%
Myo Aung	National League for Democracy	36,126	75.18
Aung Win	Union Solidarity and Development Party	10,365	21.57
Win Myint	National Unity Party	497	1.03
Kyi Myint	National Democratic Force	490	1.02
Win Shwe	New National Democracy Party	225	0.47
Tin Aung	Myanmar National Congress	185	0.38
Myo Nyunt	People's New Democratic Party	166	0.35
Total		48,054	100.00
Valid votes		48,054	94.95
Invalid/blank votes		2,554	5.05
Total votes		50,608	100.00
Registered voters/turnout		81,584	62.03
Source: UEC

Mayangon
Candidate	Party	Votes	%
May Win Myint	National League for Democracy	60,216	77.54
Ye Htut	Union Solidarity and Development Party	14,475	18.64
Khin Hlaing (Zawtika)	Independent	1,243	1.60
Khin Phyu Phyu Nyein	National Democratic Force	1,162	1.50
Ye Min Thein (Yatha)	New National Democracy Party	414	0.53
Hayma Htay	Myanmar National Congress	149	0.19
Total		77,659	100.00
Valid votes		77,659	96.51
Invalid/blank votes		2,811	3.49
Total votes		80,470	100.00
Registered voters/turnout		137,150	58.67
Source: UEC

Mingala Taungnyunt
Candidate	Party	Votes	%
Phyu Phyu Thin	National League for Democracy	55,819	87.91
Lei Lei Aye	Union Solidarity and Development Party	5,977	9.41
Thu Wai	Democratic Party	798	1.26
Phone Myint	New National Democracy Party	765	1.20
Kaung Myint Htut	Myanmar National Congress	140	0.22
Total		63,499	100.00
Valid votes		63,499	95.61
Invalid/blank votes		2,913	4.39
Total votes		66,412	100.00
Registered voters/turnout		102,908	64.54
Source: UEC

Hlegu
Candidate	Party	Votes	%
Phyo Min Thein	National League for Democracy	63,600	65.57
Aung Myat Thu	Union Solidarity and Development Party	32,252	33.25
Zin Aung	People's New Democracy Party	1,147	1.18
Total		96,999	100.00
Valid votes		96,999	93.41
Invalid/blank votes		6,842	6.59
Total votes		103,841	100.00
Registered voters/turnout		151,401	68.59
Source: UEC

Thongwa
Candidate	Party	Votes	%
Su Su Lwin	National League for Democracy	44,889	68.62
Aung Kyaw Min	Union Solidarity and Development Party	18,005	27.52
Kyi Than	National Democratic Force	1,612	2.46
Aung Gyi	People's New Democracy Party	914	1.40
Total		65,420	100.00
Valid votes		65,420	91.70
Invalid/blank votes		5,925	8.30
Total votes		71,345	100.00
Registered voters/turnout		112,790	63.25
Source: UEC

Kalaw
Candidate	Party	Votes	%
Daw Than Ngwe	National League for Democracy	43,940	59.04
Mya Win	Union Solidarity and Development Party	17,905	24.06
Khun Than Maung	Pa-O National Organisation	10,258	13.78
Khin Maung Hla	National Unity Party	1,711	2.30
Sao Tha Oo	Shan Nationalities Democratic Party	607	0.82
Total		74,421	100.00
Valid votes		74,421	92.35
Invalid/blank votes		6,167	7.65
Total votes		80,588	100.00
Registered voters/turnout		98,393	81.90
Source: UEC

Pathein
Candidate	Party	Votes	%
Win Myint	National League for Democracy	109,326	74.19
Aung Tin Myint	Union Solidarity and Development Party	34,645	23.51
Tin Win	National Democratic Force	3,388	2.30
Total		147,359	100.00
Valid votes		147,359	93.57
Invalid/blank votes		10,127	6.43
Total votes		157,486	100.00
Registered voters/turnout		217,996	72.24
Source: UEC

Maubin
Candidate	Party	Votes	%
Sein Win Han (Sein Win)	National League for Democracy	69,015	51.57
Myo Thant Tin	Union Solidarity and Development Party	55,558	41.52
Maung Maung Thin	National Unity Party	4,206	3.14
Khin Su Su Aung	National Democratic Force	3,858	2.88
Thein Shwe	Modern People's Party	1,183	0.88
Total		133,820	100.00
Valid votes		133,820	91.17
Invalid/blank votes		12,957	8.83
Total votes		146,777	100.00
Registered voters/turnout		202,953	72.32
Source: UEC

Myaungmya
Candidate	Party	Votes	%
Mahn Johnny	National League for Democracy	80,573	65.14
Phyo Ko Ko Tint San	Union Solidarity and Development Party	40,973	33.12
Aung Myo Hlaing	National Democratic Force	2,148	1.74
Total		123,694	100.00
Valid votes		123,694	93.83
Invalid/blank votes		8,129	6.17
Total votes		131,823	100.00
Registered voters/turnout		184,856	71.31
Source: UEC

Myanaung
Candidate	Party	Votes	%
Kyaw Myint	National League for Democracy	75,231	75.01
Than Htut	Union Solidarity and Development Party	21,605	21.54
Win Hlaing	National Unity Party	3,461	3.45
Total		100,297	100.00
Valid votes		100,297	89.43
Invalid/blank votes		11,853	10.57
Total votes		112,150	100.00
Registered voters/turnout		151,922	73.82
Source: UEC

Wakema
Candidate	Party	Votes	%
Myint Myint San	National League for Democracy	79,733	64.28
Htun Aung Kyaw	Union Solidarity and Development Party	32,374	26.10
Than Aung	National Unity Party	8,707	7.02
Ri Ri San	Modern People's Party	3,221	2.60
Total		124,035	100.00
Valid votes		124,035	91.72
Invalid/blank votes		11,190	8.28
Total votes		135,225	100.00
Registered voters/turnout		184,965	73.11
Source: UEC

=== Regional Parliaments ===
Bago Region Hluttaw's Kawa Township № 2 by-election, 2012
Party	Candidate	Votes	%
NLD	Myo Khaing		
USDP	Aye Win		
NUP	Kyi Lwin		
Total votes			

Ayeyarwady Region Hluttaw's Yekyi Township № 2 by-election, 2012
Party	Candidate	Votes	%
NLD	Hla Myat Thway		
USDP	Tin Soe		
NUP	Win Kyi		
Total votes			

== See also ==
- 2011–2012 Burmese political reforms
