= Thein Nyunt (politician) =

Burmese politician (born 1944)

- သိန်းညွန့်

Member of the State Administration Council
- In office 2 February 2021 – 1 February 2023

Member of the Pyithu Hluttaw
- In office 30 March 2011 – 30 March 2016
- Preceded by: None
- Succeeded by: Shwe Hla Win
- Constituency: Thingangyun Township

Personal details
- Born: 26 December 1944 (age 81) or 20 November 1944 (age 81) Kawkareik, Burma
- Party: New National Democracy Party
- Other political affiliations: National League for Democracy (1990–2010); National Democratic Force (2010–2011)
- Children: Nay Aung
- Occupation: Politician; lawyer; columnist

Thein Nyunt (Burmese: သိန်းညွန့်; born 26 December 1944 or 20 November 1944) is a Burmese lawyer, columnist, and politician. He served on Myanmar's State Administration Council from 2021 to 2023. A former member of the National League for Democracy (NLD), he founded the New National Democracy Party and co-founded the National Democratic Force (NDF) after splitting from the NLD. Thein Nyunt served as an MP for the Pyithu Hluttaw, representing Thingangyun Township, from 2011 to 2016.

== Political career ==
Thein Nyunt won a parliamentary seat in the 1990 Myanmar general election, representing Thingangyun Township in Yangon. Thein Nyunt served as a member of the National League for Democracy's Central Executive Committee.

In the lead-up to the 2010 Myanmar general election, Thein Nyunt left the NLD to co-found the National Democratic Force, a new political party, with Khin Maung Swe. The NDF contested the 2010 election, but Thein Nyunt later resigned due to internal party funding problems and ran as an independent. He won a Pyithu Hluttaw seat, representing Thingangyun Township. In July 2011, he announced that he had formed a new political party, the New National Democratic Party (NNDP), to contest the 2015 Myanmar general election. He ultimately lost the race to Shwe Hla Win, a member of the NLD.

In advance of the 2020 Myanmar general election, Thein Nyunt formed an alliance with the military-backed Union Solidarity and Development Party (USDP). The USDP pledged not to contest the Thingyangyun Township seat to improve Thein Nyunt's odds of winning the race. Thein Nyunt's son, Nay Aung, a co-founder of the NNDP, disavowed his father's military alliance, and reported the incident to the Union Election Commission. Thein Nyunt met with the Commander-in-Chief of the Armed Forces Min Aung Hlaing before the 2020 election. Thein Nyunt ultimately lost the 2020 election to an NLD candidate. He was appointed to the State Administration Council on 2 February 2021, in the aftermath of the 2021 Myanmar coup d'état.
