= Bo Bo Oo =

Myanmar politician

- ဘိုဘိုဦး
- Born: February 3, 1965 (age 61); Yangon, Myanmar
- Education: University of Yangon
- Occupation: House of Representatives (Myanmar)
- Successor: U Soe Win National Democratic Force
- Political party: National League for Democracy

Bo Bo Oo (Burmese: ဘိုဘိုဦး, MLCTS: Bo Bo U; born February 3, 1965) is a Myanmar politician. He is a member of National League for Democracy. He was elected as a member of Lower House (State Assembly) in the 2015 election. Bo Bo Oo was jailed by the former military junta from 1989 to 2009.

He was elected as a Yangon divisional parliament member on November 8, 2020, election, represent Dala Township, Yangon Region.
