= Lin Tin Htay =

Burmese politician

Member of the Amyotha Hluttaw
- In office 3 February 2016 – 1 February 2021
- Constituency: Mon State № 4
- Majority: 21,626

Personal details
- Born: 13 July 1985 (age 41) Chaungzon Township, Myanmar
- Party: National League for Democracy
- Spouse: Aye Aye Thet
- Children: Shwe Yoon Eain
- Parent(s): Shwe Ei (father); Tin Hla (mother)
- Education: Mawlamyaing University

Lin Tin Htay (Burmese: လင်းတင်ဌေး, born 13 July 1985) is a Burmese politician who has been the MP of the Amyotha Hluttaw for Mon State No. 4 constituency. He is a member of the National League for Democracy.

== Early life and education ==
Lin Tin Htay was born on 13 July 1985 in Chaungzon Township, Mon State, Myanmar. He is an ethnic Mon. He graduated with BSc (Maths) from Mawlamyaing University. He worked an officer at union election commection office. He had served as charge of township NLD youth and as member of the local villages.

== Political career ==
He is a member of the National League for Democracy. In the 2015 Myanmar general election, he was elected as an Amyotha Hluttaw MP from Mon State No. 4 parliamentary constituency, winning a majority of 21,626 votes.
