= Than Nyein =

Burmese politician and physician

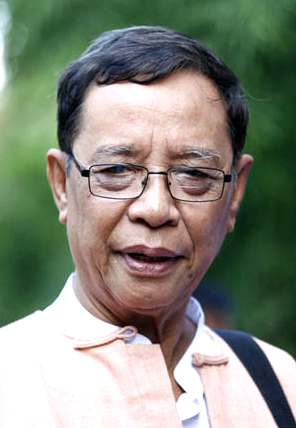
- Born: 5 August 1937; Kyauktan Township, Rangoon, British Burma
- Died: 21 May 2014 (aged 76); Yangon, Myanmar
- Education: Institute of Medicine, Yangon
- Occupation: Physician
- Political party: National League for Democracy (1988-2010); National Democratic Force (2010-2014)
- Movement: 1962 Rangoon University Protests, 8888 Uprising
- Spouse: Khin Aye
- Children: Kyaw Thu Nyein, Aung Thu Nyein, Sithu Nyein, Yin Thu Nyein, Khin Thuzar Nyein

Than Nyein (Burmese: သန်းငြိမ်း; 5 August 1937 – 21 May 2014) was a Burmese politician and physician. He was one of the founders of the National Democratic Force (NDF) party, after working for the National League for Democracy (NLD) since its inception in 1988.

== Early life and career ==
Than Nyein was born in Khanaung east village, Kyauktan Township in British Burma on 5 August 1937.

He graduated from Institute of Medicine, Yangon in 1963 after passing high school in 1954. He worked for the Ministry of Health as a leader in the leprosy prevention group and as a township medical officer. He also served for the United Nations in Sri Lanka from 1984 to 1986.

== Political imprisonment ==
He was forced to retire from government posts for his involvement in the 8888 uprising. He was arrested following an attempt by the National League for Democracy (NLD) to hold a meeting with Aung San Suu Kyi and NLD youth in Mayangone Township in Yangon. His medical licence was revoked and sentenced to 7 years in prison for participating in youth organization activities in October 1997. He was released in 2008 after his prison term was repeatedly extended by the military regime.

== Political career ==
He joined the National League for Democracy since its founding of the party. He was elected as a Hluttaw member for Kyauktan Township in the 1990 election. He served in various positions in the NLD and became a member of its Central Executive Committee in 2009. He disagreed with party secretary general Aung San Suu Kyi and advocated for major political decision that not to boycott 2010 elections.

He, together with Khin Maung Swe founded National Democratic Force Party in June 2010. He did not run for election and only four candidates from the NDF were elected as Hluttaw members in the 2010 election.

He was the brother-in-law of Khin Nyunt, then chief of military intelligence and Prime Minister of Myanmar from 2003 to 2004.

== Death ==
He died of liver cancer at the age of 76 at Pinlon Hospital of Yangon on 21 May 2014.
