= Kyauktan Township =

Kyauktan Township ကျောက်တန်း မြို့နယ်
- Township of Yangon Region
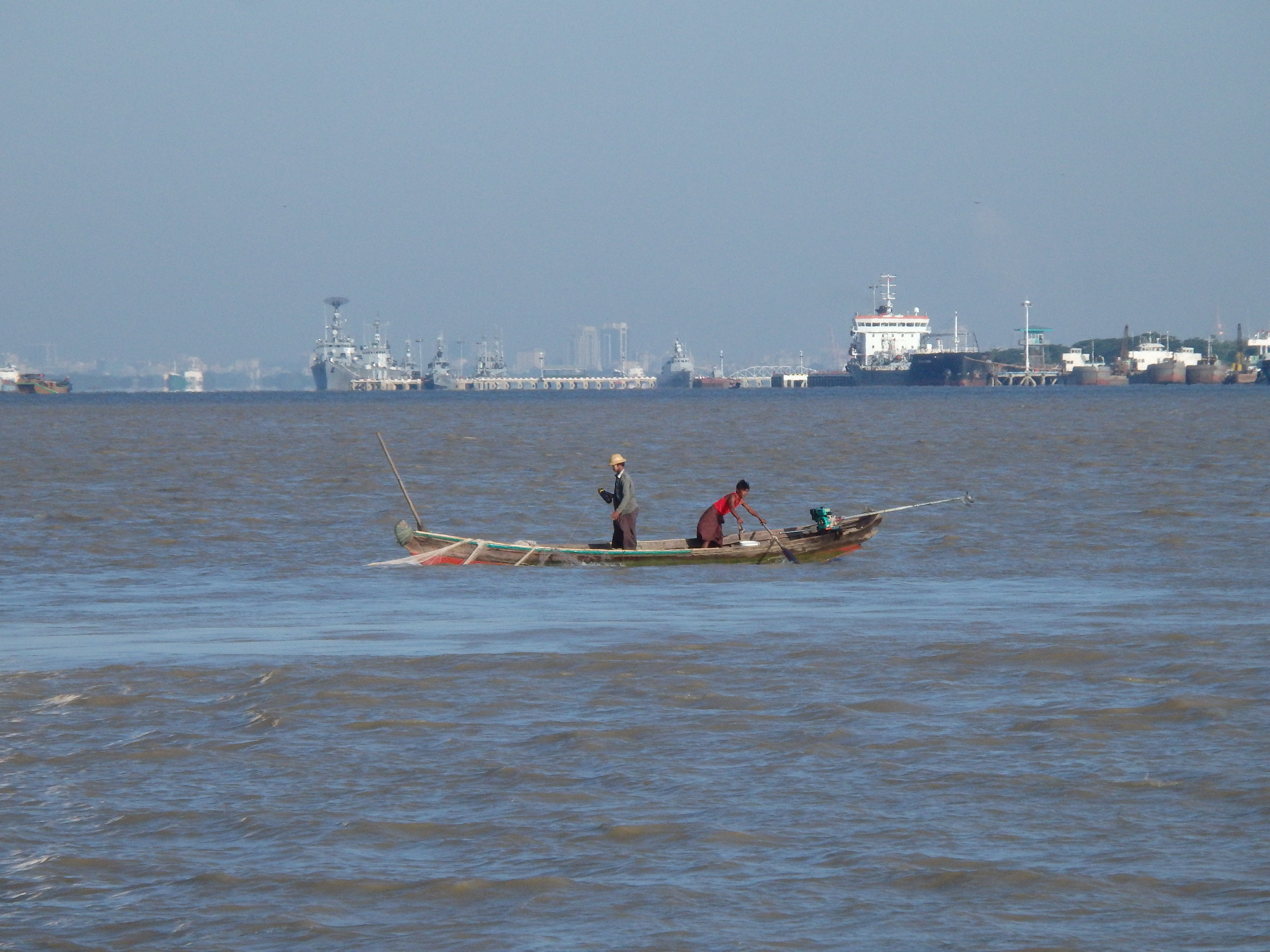
- Fisherman on the Yangon River near the Thanlyin port

- Kyauktan Township in Thanlyin District

- Location within Myanmar
- Coordinates: 16°38′17″N 96°19′22″E
- Country: Myanmar
- Region: Yangon Region
- District: Thanlyin District

Population (2014)
  - Total: 132,765
- Time zone: UTC6:30 (MST)
- Area codes: 1 (mobile: 80, 99)

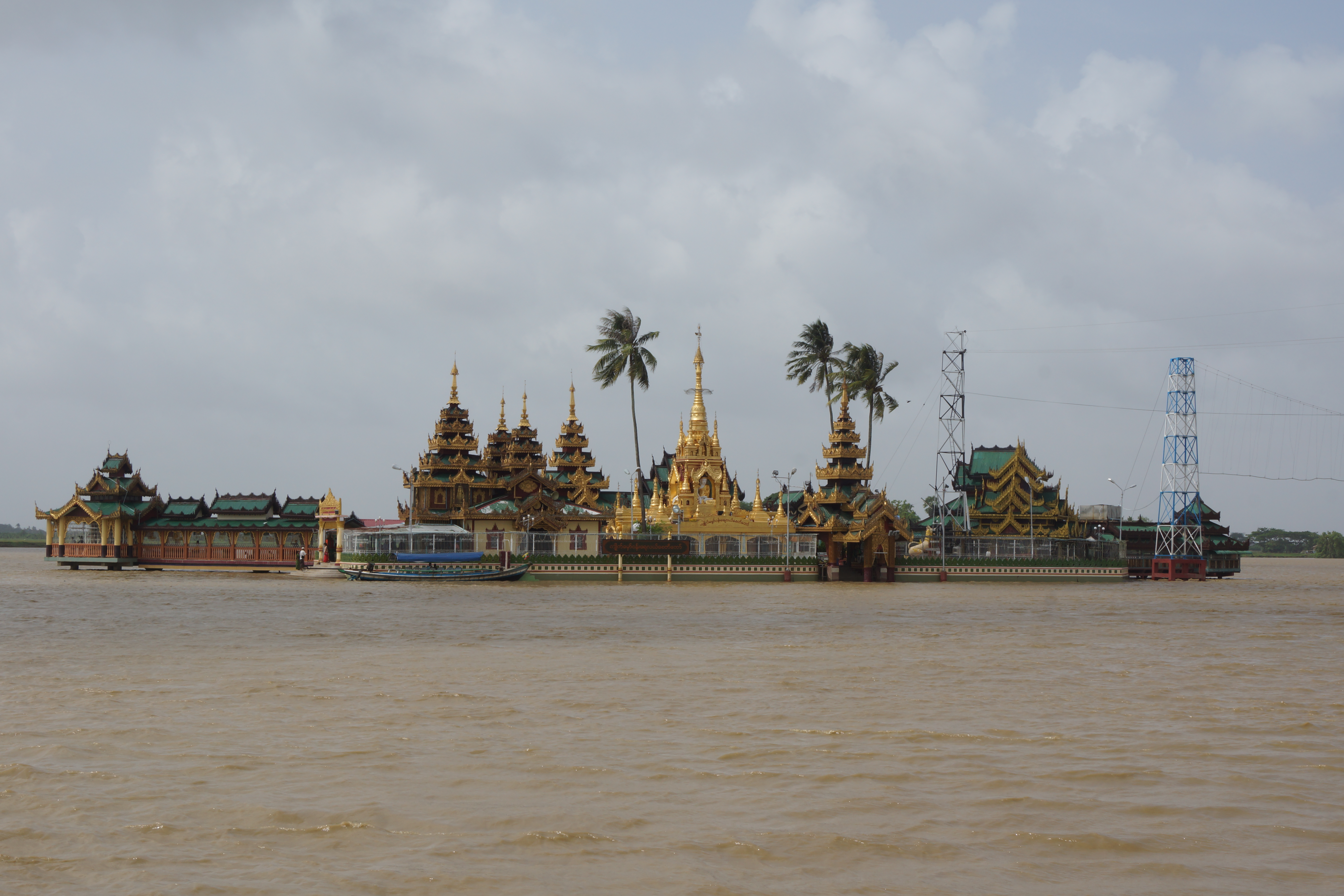
Kyauktan township in 2014

Kyauktan Township (Burmese: ကျောက်တန်း မြို့နယ် [tɕaʊʔtáɰ̃ mjo̰nɛ̀]) is a township of Yangon Region, located in the southern section of the region.

== Prominent People from Kyauktan Township ==
- Dr. Than Nyein (5 August 1936 – 21 May 2014), founder of National Democratic Force Party, was born in Khanaung east village.
