= Saw Daniel =

Burmese politician

- စောဒန်နီယယ်

Member of the State Administration Council
- In office 3 February 2021 – 1 February 2023

Secretary of the Kayah State Democratic Party

Personal details
- Born: 25 November 1957 (age 68) Burma
- Party: Kayah State Democratic Party (Until 2021)
- Occupation: Politician

Saw Daniel (Burmese: စောဒန်နီယယ်, b. 25 November 1957) is a Burmese politician of Kayah descent and former vice-chairman of the Kayah State Democratic Party (KySDP). He was appointed to the State Administration Council on 3 February 2021, following the 2021 Myanmar coup d'état, and left office on 1 February 2023. On 4 February, KySDP distanced itself from Saw Daniel, announcing it had dismissed Saw Daniel from the party for accepting the appointment, and called for the regime to honor the 2020 election results.

Saw Daniel contested the 2015 election as a KNDP candidate and the 2020 election as a KySDP candidate, losing both elections to an NLD candidate.
