= Tin Aye =

Burmese lieutenant general

- တင်အေး
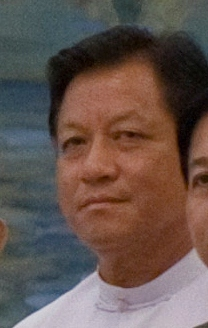
- Tin Aye in 2010

Chairman of the Union Election Commission
- In office 30 March 2011 – 30 March 2016
- President: Thein Sein
- Preceded by: Thein Soe
- Succeeded by: Hla Thein

Pyithu Hluttaw MP
- In office 31 January 2011 – 16 February 2011
- President: Thein Sein
- Preceded by: Constituency established
- Succeeded by: Khin Thanda
- Constituency: Tada-U Township

Personal details
- Born: 20 October 1945 (age 80) Letsaungyu village, Tada-U Township, Burma
- Party: USDP
- Other political affiliations: SPDC (1997–2011)
- Spouse: Kyi Kyi Ohn
- Children: 3
- Education: Defence Services Academy
- Awards: 15 decorations, including Distinguished Service Medal

Military service
- Allegiance: Myanmar
- Branch/service: Myanmar Army
- Years of service: through April 2010
- Rank: Lieutenant General
- Commands: MOC-4; Southern Command

Tin Aye (Burmese: တင်အေး; born 20 October 1945) is a retired Burmese lieutenant general and previously chaired the country's Union Election Commission (UEC). In the 2010 Burmese general election, he contested a Pyithu Hluttaw seat in Tada-U Township and won. However, he vacated his seat in February 2011 to assume a new position, as Chairman of the UEC. He graduated from the Defence Services Academy and is a decorated soldier, having received 15 decorations. He formerly served as the chairman of Union of Myanmar Economic Holdings (UMEH), a conglomerate owned by the Burmese military.
