= Khin Maung Swe =

Burmese politician (born 1942)

Member of the State Administration Council
- In office 2 February 2021 – 1 February 2023
- Leader: Min Aung Hlaing

Chairman of the National Democratic Force
- Incumbent
- Assumed office June 2010

Member-elect of Pyithu Hluttaw (1990)
- Preceded by: Constituency established
- Succeeded by: Constituency abolished
- Constituency: Sanchaung Township

Personal details
- Born: 20 July 1942 (age 84) Ngathaingchaung, Myanmar
- Party: National League for Democracy; National Democratic Force (2010–present)
- Occupation: Politician

Khin Maung Swe (Burmese: ခင်မောင်ဆွေ) is a Burmese politician and former member of Myanmar's State Administration Council, from 2021 to 2023. He is the chairman of the National Democratic Force (NDF).

== Early life and education ==
Khin Maung Swe was born on 20 July 1942 in Ngathaingchaung, Pathein District. He graduated in 1966 with a degree in geology. From 1966 to 1988, he worked as a geologist at the Myanmar Petroleum Corporation.

== Career ==
He served as secretary of the Petroleum Workers' Union during the 8888 Uprising. At the invitation of Aung San Suu Kyi, he became a member of the National League for Democracy (NLD) in October 1988. In July 1989, he became a member of the executive committee.

In the 1990 elections, he was elected as the Pyithu Hluttaw MP for Constituency of Sanchaung Township but was not allowed to assume his seat. In October 1990, Khin Maung Swe was convicted of sedition and sentenced to 17 years in prison.

After the NLD decided to boycott Burma's general elections in 2010, Khin Maung Swe and a few other leading NLD members created the new party to contest the controversial polls. His party won only 16 out of 161 parliamentary seats it contested. With other democratic parties, NDF complained to the Burmese government of widespread vote rigging. He was appointed as a member of the State Administration Council on 2 February 2021, in the aftermath of the 2021 Myanmar coup d'état.
