= State Administration Council =

Military junta government of Myanmar from 2021 to 2025

- နိုင်ငံတော်စီမံအုပ်ချုပ်ရေးကောင်စီ 2021–2025
- State Seal of Myanmar

Overview
- Established: 2 February 2021
- Dissolved: 31 July 2025
- State: Myanmar
- Leader: Chairman (Min Aung Hlaing)
- Appointed by: Commander-in-Chief of Defence Services exercising emergency powers
- Responsible to: Commander-in-Chief of Defence Services
- Website: Official website

The State Administration Council (Burmese: နိုင်ငံတော်စီမံအုပ်ချုပ်ရေးကောင်စီ; abbreviated SAC or နစက) was a military junta that governed Myanmar from 2021 to 2025, established by Commander-in-Chief of Defence Services Min Aung Hlaing following the February 2021 coup d'état and the declaration of a state of emergency by the National Defence and Security Council (NDSC). Under the constitution, the Commander-in-Chief holds absolute legislative, executive, and judicial power during a state of emergency. Min Aung Hlaing delegated his legislative power to the SAC, which he chaired. It formed a provisional administration, also led by Min Aung Hlaing as Prime Minister of Myanmar. It was dissolved with the conclusion of the state of emergency at the end of July 2025, though Min Aung Hlaing's military dictatorship continued through his role on the NDSC, with all powers of the State Administration Council being taken up directly by that body.

The Committee Representing Pyidaungsu Hluttaw (CRPH) has designated the SAC as a "terrorist group" and the SAC's claim to legitimacy was rejected by the competing National Unity Government of Myanmar (NUG).

== History ==
=== Formation ===
The State Administration Council was formed by Min Aung Hlaing on 2 February 2021 with 11 members in the aftermath of the 2021 Myanmar military coup d'état. On 3 February, five civilian members were added to the council. On 17 March, a civilian joined the council. On 30 March, a military officer and a civilian joined the council. As of late August, in total, the council comprises nine military officers and ten civilians.

In the leadup to and in the aftermath of the coup d'état, the military had made overtures to political parties allied with the Union Solidarity and Development Party (USDP), the military proxy party. On 14 August 2020, 34 pro-military parties including USDP had met with Min Aung Hlaing to seek assurances from the military to intervene in the event of electoral integrity issues during the upcoming 2020 Myanmar general election. Min Aung Hlaing's remarks during the meeting raised concerns that the military had threatened to stage a coup.

As of late August 2021, ten civilian members of the SAC include eight parties' politicians, Sai Lone Saing and Shwe Kyein of the USDP, Mahn Nyein Maung of the Kayin People's Party (KPP), Thein Nyunt of the New National Democracy Party (NNDP), Khin Maung Swe of the National Democratic Force (NDF), Aye Nu Sein of the Arakan National Party (ANP), Banyar Aung Moe of the Mon Unity Party (MUP) and Saw Daniel, formerly of the Kayah State Democratic Party (KySDP). Khin Maung Swe and Thein Nyunt had co-founded NDF, a National League for Democracy (NLD) splinter group, while Mahn Nyein Maung was a former leader of the Karen National Union.

Several organisations have distanced themselves from civilian members of the SAC. Following Mahn Nyein Maung's appointment, the KNU distanced itself from him, and reiterated its opposition to the military coup. On 4 February, KySDP announced it had dismissed Saw Daniel from the party for accepting the appointment, and called for the Burmese military to honor the 2020 election results.

On 5 February, SAC formed a press team led by Major General Zaw Min Tun and deputy Thet Swe.

=== Sanctions ===
On 11 February, the United States government imposed sanctions on six military officers of the SAC, namely Min Aung Hlaing, Soe Win, Mya Tun Oo, Tin Aung San, Aung Lin Dwe, and Ye Win Oo. On the same day, Soe Htut, who later became a member of the SAC, was also sanctioned. On 22 February, the United States government imposed sanctions on two military officers, Maung Maung Kyaw and Moe Myint Tun. On 17 May and 2 July, the U.S. government imposed sanctions on four and three civilian members of the SAC, respectively. On 17 May, the United States government designated the SAC as an object to sanctions.

As of late August 2021, of all SAC members, only three civilians, Jeng Phang Naw Taung, Moung Har and Shwe Kyein, have not been sanctioned by the United States government.

=== Government reshuffle ===
SAC has terminated numerous civil servants across multiple government bodies, including the Supreme Court, union-level ministries, the Naypyidaw Council, and Union Civil Service Board. It has quickly appointed replacements, including union ministers, mayors, agency executives, members of the Central Bank of Myanmar, Union Civil Service Board, judges, and Supreme Court justices. On 8 February, SAC appointed a new Constitutional Tribunal.

On 11 February, SAC formed State and Region Administration Councils and their leaders for Myanmar's 14 states and regions. It also appointed military officers to run Self-Administered Zone Councils for the country's autonomous zones.

==== 2 August reshuffle ====
- Under Order No 57/2023, the State Administration Council was reformed with 18 members.
- Under Order No 55/2023, U Maung Ko and Dr Aung Kyaw Min were retired from their duty assignment as SAC members.
- Under Order No 56/2023, Dr Kyaw Tun is transferred and assigned as a member of the SAC's Central Advisory Body.
- Under Order No 58/2023, Union Chief Justice U Htun Htun Oo is retired from duty assignment.
- Under Order No 59/2023, Union Minister for Religious Affairs and Culture U Ko Ko, Union Minister for Electric Power U Thaung Han, Union Auditor-General U Tin Oo, Anti-Corruption Commission Chairman Dr Htay Aung and Myanmar National Human Rights Commission Chairman U Hla Myint were retired from their duty assignment.
- Under Order No 60/2023, Union Minister of Energy U Myo Myint Oo and Union Minister for Labour Dr Pwint San were retired from their duty assignment.

=== Resistance and protests ===
On 9 February, a 36-page draft cybersecurity law proposed by SAC was circulated to Myanmar's mobile operators and telecoms license holders for industry feedback. The draft bill would make internet providers accountable for preventing or removing content that "cause[s] hatred, destroy unity and tranquility" and would require ISPs to store user data at a government-prescribed location for a minimum of 3 years. A coalition of 150 civil service organizations publicly denounced the bill for violating the fundamental rights to freedom of expression, data protection, and privacy, and other democratic norms in the digital space, and for granting state authorities the ability to ban unfavorable content, restrict ISPs, and intercept data.

On 10 February, the SAC conducted late-night raids to arrest senior civilian politicians and election officials throughout the country, in an attempt to neutralize the NLD. High-profile arrests include the detentions of the Chief Ministers of Tanintharyi Region, Shan, Chin, Kachin, Karen and Rakhine State's, as well as dozens of township- and district-level election officials.

On 11 February, SAC remitted the sentences of 23,314 prisoners. Among those released were supporters of the assassin who killed Ko Ni, the NLD's legal advisor. The Assistance Association for Political Prisoners expressed serious concern that the amnesty was intended to clear prison space in order to detain political prisoners. A recent spate of crimes, including arson, has coincided with the timing of the amnesty.

On 14 February, SAC amended existing privacy protection laws, which effectively enables the Commander-in-Chief to temporarily restrict or suspend the fundamental rights of citizens, including warrantless arrests and searches, until power is transferred to a newly elected government. SAC also enacted Law 3/2021, which requires all residents to register overnight guests outside of their official household with their respective township or ward administrators. The military era law had previously been repealed by the NLD-led government.

On 12 February, the Ministry of Information sent directives to the Myanmar Press Council, a media-adjudication and media-dispute settling body, that the media must report ethically and avoid instigating public unrest but the gradual resignation of twenty three out of twenty six members following the military coup has made it subjected to the cessation of functions. More distinctively, the directives say that the words "regime or junta" cannot be used for the State Administrative Council. Ten days after the directions of the Ministry of Information to the Press Council, Min Aung Hlaing, the military coup leader, threatened publications in Myanmar would lose their publishing licenses for the usage of the military regime or junta. Most local media said terms like "military council, junta or regime" will still be used in their reporting.

On 1 March, the CRPH designated the SAC as a "terrorist group".

=== Formation of caretaker government ===
On 1 August, SAC was re-formed as a caretaker government and Min Aung Hlaing appointed himself as Prime Minister of that government. The same day, Min Aung Hlaing announced that the country's state of emergency had been extended by an additional 2 years, until elections were held. On 31 July 2023, the state of emergency was extended another six months for the fourth time, starting from 1 August.

=== Conscription ===
On 10 February 2024, the State Administration Council activated conscription under the 2010 SPDC People's Military Service Law in response to anti-junta ethnic militias and pro-democracy rebels capturing massive swathes of territory.

=== State Security and Peace Commission ===
On 31 July 2025, Min Aung Hlaing ended the state of emergency, later State Security and Peace Commission and Union Government formed, with its members appointed by Min Aung Hlaing himself. Junta propaganda hailed this change as a step towards multi-party democracy.

== Members ==
=== Current members ===
On 31 January 2025, the State Administration Council reconstituted itself with Order No. 7/2025, along with the reshuffle of cabinet member.

The council's members are as of 31 January 2025.

	Name	Position
1	Senior General Min Aung Hlaing	Chairman
2	Vice-Senior General Soe Win	Vice Chairman
3	General Aung Lin Dwe	Secretary
4	General Ye Win Oo	Joint Secretary
5	General Mya Tun oo	Member
6	Admiral Tin Aung San	Member
7	General Maung Maung Aye	Member
8	General Nyo Saw	Member
9	Lt-Gen Yar Pyae	Member
10	U Wunna Maung Lwin	Member
11	Daw Dwe Bu	Member
12	Porel Aung Thein	Member
13	Mahn Nyein Maung	Member
14	Dr Hmuh Thang	Member
15	Dr Ba Swe	Member
16	Khun San Lwin	Member

=== Former members ===
	Name	Position	Took office	Left office	Party	Remark
1	General Maung Maung Kyaw	Member	2 February 2021	1 February 2023	Military	
2	Lieutenant General Moe Myint Tun	Member	2 February 2021	24 September 2023	Military	
3	Thein Nyunt	Member	2 February 2021	1 February 2023	New National Democracy Party	
4	Khin Maung Swe	Member	2 February 2021	1 February 2023	National Democratic Force	
5	Aye Nu Sein	Member	3 February 2021	1 February 2023	Arakan National Party	
6	Jeng Phang Naw Taung	Member	3 February 2021	1 February 2023	Independent	
7	Moung Har	Member	3 February 2021	1 February 2023	Independent	
8	Sai Lone Saing	Member	3 February 2021	1 February 2023	Union Solidarity and Development Party	
9	Saw Daniel	Member	3 February 2021	1 February 2023	Kayah State Democratic Party (Note: Saw Daniel was expelled from the party on 4 February 2021.)	
10	Banyar Aung Moe	Member	17 March 2021	1 February 2023	Mon Unity Party	
11	Pu Gin Kam Lian	Member	1 February 2023	17 February 2023	ZCD	
12	Maung Ko	Member	1 February 2023	1 August 2023	Independent	
13	Dr Kyaw Tun	Member	1 February 2023	1 August 2023	Independent	
14	Dr Aung Kyaw Min	Member	1 February 2023	1 August 2023	Independent	
15	Lt General Soe Htut	Member				
16	Shwe Kyein	Member		31 January 2025		They were moved to Central Advisory Body members
17	Yan Kyaw	Member		31 January 2025		They were moved to Central Advisory Body members

=== Central Advisory Body ===
On 1 February 2023, the SAC announced the formation of State Administration Council's Central Advisory Body under Order No 7/2023.

Central Advisory Body (as of 1 February 2023)
	Name	Position	Took office	Left office
1	Saw Tun Aung Myint	Team Leader	1 February 2023	Incumbent
2	Thein Nyunt	Member	1 February 2023	Incumbent
3	Khin Maung Swe	Member	1 February 2023	Incumbent
4	Aye Nu Sein	Member	1 February 2023	Incumbent
5	Moung Har	Member	1 February 2023	Incumbent
6	Sai Lone Seng	Member	1 February 2023	Incumbent
7	Saw Daniel	Member	1 February 2023	Incumbent
8	Dr Banyar Aung Moe	Member	1 February 2023	Incumbent
9	Dr Maung Maung Naing	Member	1 February 2023	Incumbent
10	Dr Kyaw Tun	Member	2 August 2023	Incumbent

== Territorial control ==
Territorial control during the Myanmar civil war. Territory controlled by the military junta shown in red

In November 2020, the Burmese military negotiated an informal ceasefire with the Arakan Army (AA), an insurgent group seeking autonomy for Rakhine State. The ceasefire enabled the military to redeploy allowing thousands of troops between January and early February 2021 to the country's heartland, in the leadup and wake of the February coup. In this vacuum, the AA established its own governing institutions in Rakhine State, including in Rohingya-majority areas. In August 2021, the AA announced a parallel judicial system for state residents. By September 2021, the AA and its political wing, the United League of Arakan (ULA) effectively controlled 75% of the state's townships.

As of October 2021, over a hundred local SAC-appointed administrators in Sagaing, Magwe, and Yangon Regions have also resigned from their posts, following threats from People's Defence Force groups. Local administration offices have been used to strengthen the military's administrative power, revive neighbourhood surveillance networks, and enforce SAC mandates, including registration of household guests with local authorities.

On 5 September 2022, the Special Advisory Council for Myanmar (SAC-M) reported that the junta has stable territorial control in 22% (72 of 330) of townships in Myanmar, comprising only 17% of Myanmar's land area. The report also noted that the regime's governance functions and administrative capacity were collapsing throughout the country, with much of Myanmar's townships now becoming contested territory, and resistance forces having effective territorial control in 39% of townships. Armed resistance has been most endemic in the Bamar heartland, particularly in Magway and Sagaing regions as well as parts of Kachin, Kayin, Mon, and Rakhine States. On 7 September, NUG acting president Duwa Lashi La stated that the regime had lost control of half of the country, with the NUG having formed over 300 People's Defence Force battalions, and township public defence forces in 250 of the country's townships.

== Meetings ==
By end of September 2021, the SAC meeting had been held 15 times. It is unclear what an ordinal number of the coordination meeting held on 15 February 2021 was. The SAC meetings reported by state-run English newspaper are as follows.

Meeting	Date	Chairman
Coordination meeting	15 February 2021	Senior General Min Aung Hlaing
3rd coordination meeting	22 February 2021	Senior General Min Aung Hlaing
Meeting 4/2021	1 March 2021	Senior General Min Aung Hlaing
Meeting 5/2021	8 March 2021	Senior General Min Aung Hlaing
Meeting 6/2021	15 March 2021	Senior General Min Aung Hlaing
Meeting 7/2021	22 March 2021	Senior General Min Aung Hlaing
Meeting 8/2021	30 March 2021	Senior General Min Aung Hlaing
Meeting 9/2021	26 April 2021	Senior General Min Aung Hlaing
Meeting 10/2021	10 May 2021	Senior General Min Aung Hlaing
Meeting 11/2021	24 May 2021	Senior General Min Aung Hlaing
Meeting 12/2021	7 June 2021	Senior General Min Aung Hlaing
Meeting 13/2021	7 August 2021	Senior General Min Aung Hlaing
Meeting 14/2021	23 August 2021	Senior General Min Aung Hlaing
Meeting 15/2021	24 September 2021	Senior General Min Aung Hlaing

== International recognition ==
An increasing number of foreign governments have curbed diplomatic ties with the military-led government, following the coup. In February 2021, the Government of New Zealand officially announced it does not recognise the legitimacy of the military-led government, shortly after the coup. The Government of Japan does not recognize the military-led government as Myanmar's legitimate governing body. In August 2021, it refused to issue visas for two military-appointed diplomats intended to replace two Japan-based diplomats fired in March for protesting the coup.

Since the coup, ASEAN has been circumspect in avoiding the impression of giving de jure recognition to SAC in official and legal communications. Indonesia's foreign minister Retno Marsudi has led efforts to exclude SAC at the political level from all ASEAN meetings until democracy was restored through an inclusive process. In April 2021, ASEAN member states adopted a Five-Point Consensus with respect to the Myanmar situation, calling for the immediate cessation of violence in the country, commencement of constructive dialogue for a peaceful resolution, appointment of a special ASEAN envoy to mediate on ASEAN's behalf, the provision of humanitarian assistance via the AHA Centre, and ASEAN's ability to meet with all concerned parties.

On 4 October 2021, ASEAN leaders, including Indonesian foreign minister, Retno Marsudi, and Singaporean foreign minister, Vivian Balakrishnan, publicly expressed disappointment about the Burmese military's commitment to a peace plan. Malaysian Foreign Minister Saifuddin Abdullah expressed the possibility that the SAC chairman, Min Aung Hlaing and the junta could be excluded from the upcoming ASEAN Summit. ASEAN ultimately barred Min Aung Hlaing from attending the October summit. As of 1 November 2021, ASEAN's official website continues to list Kyaw Tin, appointed by the civilian-led government, as Myanmar's foreign minister, and civilian-appointed Win Myint as Myanmar's head of state.

As Myanmar's humanitarian situation has continued to decline after the coup, particularly with the execution of four political prisoners in July 2022, ASEAN member states have expressed dissatisfaction with the SAC for its intransigence in implementing ASEAN's Five-Point Consensus. In August 2022, Indonesia's foreign minister publicly criticized SAC's failure to implement the peace plan and its broken promises. In September 2022, Singapore's foreign minister expressed its disappointment in SAC's progress against the consensus. On 20 September 2022, Malaysia became the first ASEAN member state to publicly engage with the competing NUG.

In November 2022, the European Union instituted economic sanctions on the State Administration Council.

In 2021, the United Nations General Assembly adopted a resolution condemning Myanmar's military leaders and calling for a halt in arms sales to the country. The resolution calls on the Myanmar's military to respect democratic election results and release political detainees as well as urging non-recognition of the junta.

== See also ==
- Ministry of the State Administration Council Chairman's Office
- 2021 Myanmar coup d'état
- Provisional Government of Myanmar
- State Peace and Development Council, the military regime from 1988 to 2011
