= Ohn Kyaing =

Burmese politician

- အုန်းကြိုင်

Member of the Pyithu Hluttaw
- In office 2 May 2012 – 29 January 2016
- Preceded by: Mya Aye
- Succeeded by: Nyein Thit
- Constituency: Mahaaungmye Township

Member-elect of the Pyithu Hluttaw
- Preceded by: Constituency established
- Succeeded by: Constituency abolished
- Constituency: Southeast Mandalay № 2
- Majority: 32,718 (76%)

Personal details
- Born: 2 July 1944 (age 81) Mawlamyinegyun, Burma
- Party: National League for Democracy
- Relations: Ba Shin (father); Sein (mother)
- Occupation: Politician and journalist

Ohn Kyaing (Burmese: အုန်းကြိုင်, also known by his pen names Maung Chit Phwe, Aung Wint, and Aung Tint) is a Burmese politician and former political prisoner, previously served as a Pyithu Hluttaw member of parliament for Mahaaungmye Township. He serves as a member for the National League for Democracy's (NLD) Central Executive Committee.

In the 1990 Burmese general election, he was elected as an Pyithu Hluttaw MP, winning a majority of 32,718 (76% of the votes), but was never allowed to assume his seat.

Ohn Kyaing graduated with a BA degree in 1967. He earned a journalism diploma in 1972 and received a scholarship to study in the United States in 1979. Throughout his journalism career, he served as an editor of Kyemon, Hanthawaddy, The Guardian, and Botataung newspapers. he retired from his position at The Guardian newspaper following the 8888 Uprising.

On 7 September 1990, he was sentenced to prison for violating the 1950 Emergency Provisions Act, a sentence that was extended by 10 years. In his last stint in prison, he served a sentence at Bago prison from 1 October to 11 December 2008.
