= May Win Myint =

Burmese politician

May Win Myint MP
- မေဝင်းမြင့်
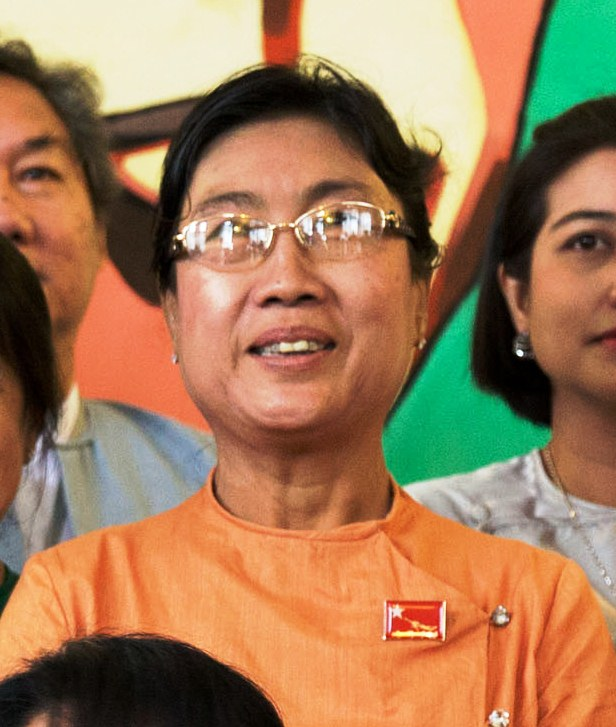
- May Win Myint in 2012

Member of the Pyithu Hluttaw for Mayangon Township
- Incumbent
- Assumed office 2 May 2012
- Preceded by: Pwint Hsan
- Majority: 60,216 (77.5%)

Member-elect of Pyithu Hluttaw (1990)
- Preceded by: Constituency established
- Succeeded by: Constituency abolished
- Constituency: Mayangon Township № 2
- Majority: 28,513 (74%)

Personal details
- Born: 8 March 1950 (age 76) Moulmein, Burma
- Party: National League for Democracy
- Children: Aung Phone Myint; Thuzar Myint
- Parent(s): Thaung Nyunt (father); San Thwin (mother)
- Education: Institute of Medicine-1, Rangoon (MBBS)
- Occupation: Politician, physician

May Win Myint (Burmese: မေဝင်းမြင့်; born 8 March 1950) is a Burmese politician, physician and former inmate who served as a Pyithu Hluttaw MP for Mayangon Township until 2021 and member of the National League for Democracy's Central Executive Committee.

== Biography ==
May Win Myint was born on 8 March 1950 in Moulmein, Mon State, Myanmar. A daughter of Thaung Nyunt and San Thwin. She graduated from the Institute of Medicine-1, Rangoon with a medical degree in 1976 and worked as a part-time doctor for North-Okkalapa and Kyauktada Co-operative Clinics from 1978-1981 and also at Rangoon General Hospital from 1981-1983. From 1983-1988 she worked at the Handicap Hospital and spent a decade practicing medicine in Rangoon, before joining the National League for Democracy in 1988, during the 8888 Uprising.

She contested the Mayangon Township constituency no. 2 and won a Pyithu Hluttaw seat in the 1990 Burmese general election, winning a majority of 28,513 (74% of the votes), but was never allowed to assume her seat. May Win Myint boycotted the National Convention in December 1995 along with other MPs from the National League for Democracy, and is the Secretary of Mayangone Township National League for Democracy. On 28 October 1997, she was arrested and charged on 26 November 2007 under the 1950 Emergency Act, after National League for Democracy members tried to meet Aung San Suu Kyi, who was under house arrest at the time. She was subsequently jailed for 7 years at the Insein Prison, and her prison term was given two one-year extensions. May Win Myint was released on 28 September 2008.

In the 2012 Burmese by-elections, she contested the Mayangon Township constituency and won a Pyithu Hluttaw seat. In the 2015 Myanmar general election, she was re-elected Pyithu Hluttaw MP for Mayangon Township.
