= Khin Htay Kywe =

Burmese politician

- ခင်ဌေးကြွယ်

Member of the Mon State Hluttaw
- Incumbent
- Assumed office 8 February 2016
- Constituency: Chaungzon Township

Member of the Pyithu Hluttaw
- In office 2 May 2012 – 29 January 2016
- Preceded by: Aye Myint
- Succeeded by: Naing Thaung Nyunt
- Constituency: Mawlamyine Township

Member-elect of the Pyithu Hluttaw
- Preceded by: Constituency established
- Succeeded by: Constituency abolished
- Constituency: Chaungzon № 2
- Majority: 18,307 (80%)

Personal details
- Born: 16 November 1946 (age 79) Muyitkalay village, Chaungzon, Burma
- Party: National League for Democracy
- Relations: Kunpa (father)
- Education: Rangoon Arts and Science University; SHS No. 3 Tamwe
- Occupation: Politician

Khin Htay Kywe (Burmese: ခင်ဌေးကြွယ်, pronounced [kʰɪ̀ɰ̃ tʰé tɕwɛ̀]) is a Burmese politician and former political prisoner, and currently serves as Mon State Hluttaw MP for Chaungzon Township. In the 1990 Burmese general election, she was elected as an Pyithu Hluttaw MP, winning a majority of 18,307 (80% of the votes), but was never allowed to assume her seat.

She attended the State High School No. 3 Tamwe and graduated from the Rangoon Arts and Science University in 1970 with a BS degree in zoology. In 1978, she became a lawyer.
