= Khin San Hlaing =

Burmese politician

- ခင်စန်းလှိုင်

Member of the Pyithu Hluttaw
- Incumbent
- Assumed office 2 May 2012
- Preceded by: Kyaw Hsan
- Constituency: Pale Township

Member-elect of the Pyithu Hluttaw
- Preceded by: Constituency established
- Succeeded by: Constituency abolished
- Constituency: Wetlet № 2
- Majority: 29,805 (75%)

Personal details
- Born: 16 October 1956 (age 69) Wetlet, Sagaing Division, Burma
- Party: National League for Democracy
- Relations: Shwe Ba (father); Lay (mother)
- Education: Wetlet State High School
- Occupation: Politician and lawyer

Khin San Hlaing (Burmese: ခင်စန်းလှိုင်) is a Burmese politician and political prisoner who currently serves as a Pyithu Hluttaw member of parliament for Pale Township. In the 1990 Burmese general election, she was elected as an Pyithu Hluttaw MP, winning a majority of 29,805 (75% of the votes), but was never allowed to assume her seat.

Khin San Hlaing attended Wetlet Government High School and obtained a Bachelor of Laws (LLB) degree in 1982. She became a High Court advocate in 1985.
