= Nay Zin Lat =

Burmese businessman and politician

Nay Zin Latt
- နေဇင်လတ်

Political Advisor to the Office of the President of Burma
- In office April 2011 – April 2015

Founder of the National Development Party (Myanmar)
- Incumbent
- Assumed office 9 July 2015

Personal details
- Born: 19 December 1952 (age 73) Yangon, Myanmar
- Citizenship: Myanmar
- Party: National Development Party
- Spouse: Khin San
- Education: Rangoon Institute of Technology; Officer Training School MBA, Ph.D (Aldersgate College-Philippines) Professor (Aldersgate College)
- Occupation: Chairman of Ambo Hotel Group
- Website: facebook.com/Dr.NayZinLatt

Military service
- Allegiance: Myanmar
- Branch/service: Myanmar Army
- Years of service: 1981-1991
- Rank: Captain

Nay Zin Latt (Burmese: နေဇင်လတ်) is a Burmese politician and businessman. He is a former adviser to President Thein Sein, serving as part of the political advisory group from April 2011 to April 2015. He retired from his post on 30 April 2015 to establish the National Development Party. Nay Zin Lat is a former military officer.
