= National Development Party (Myanmar) =

National Development Party အမျိုးသားတိုးတက်ရေးပါတီ
- Chairman: Nay Zin Lat
- Founded: 9 July 2015
- Ideology: Burmese nationalism Buddhist nationalism Ultranationalism
- Political position: Far-right
- Colours: Red

The National Development Party (Burmese: အမျိုးသားတိုးတက်ရေးပါတီ; abbr. NDP) is a minor political party in Myanmar. It was founded by Nay Zin Lat, a former political adviser to President Thein Sein, who retired from his post on 30 April 2015. The party registered with the Union Election Commission before the registration deadline on 30 April, and in advance for the 2015 general election. The party is organised by graduates and students of the Centre for Strategic and International Studies, a local NGO headed Nay Zin Lat himself. The party promotes an ultranationalist and Buddhist nationalist platform, espousing racialist views and advocating suffrage for monks.

The party registered 354 candidates who contested in the 2015 general election, but failed to win a single seat.
