= Union Election Commission =

Electoral commission of Myanmar

Union Election Commission (UEC)
- ပြည်ထောင်စု ရွေးကောက်ပွဲ ကော်မရှင်

Commission overview
- Formed: 8 March 2010; 16 years ago
- Jurisdiction: Myanmar (Burma)
- Headquarters: Naypyidaw
- Commission executive: Than Soe, Chairman
- Website: uec.gov.mm

The Union Election Commission (Burmese: ပြည်ထောင်စု ရွေးကောက်ပွဲ ကော်မရှင်, abbreviated UEC) is the national level electoral commission of Myanmar (Burma), responsible for organising and overseeing elections in Burma, as well as vetting parliamentary candidates and political parties.

== History ==
The Union Election Commission is mandated by the Union Election Commission Law, enacted on 8 March 2010. The UEC's first chairman was Thein Soe, a former major-general, an appointment that was derided by the media. On 18 February 2011, Tin Aye, a former lieutenant-general and member of the State Peace and Development Council, was appointed by the Pyidaungsu Hluttaw, to replace Thein Soe. The UEC was criticised by various advocacy groups and the United Nations for its lack of independence and impartiality for its handling of the 2012 Myanmar by-elections. The UN has also noted the UEC's failure to follow up on electoral complaints, including voting procedures.

During the 2015 Myanmar general election, the National League for Democracy won a landslide victory, marking a major political transition of power-sharing with the Burmese military. On 28 March, President Htin Kyaw appointed Hla Thein as the UEC's chair.

On the eve of the 2021 Myanmar coup d'état, the military deemed the results of the 2020 Myanmar general election fraudulent, citing voting irregularities. On 28 January, the UEC rejected the military's allegations, unable to substantiate their claims, sparking fears of an impending coup. On 1 February, the military staged a coup, deposing the civilian-elected government. During the coup, Hla Thein was arrested by military authorities. Two days later, the military junta appointed new members to the UEC, including Thein Soe, UEC's inaugural chair and a former military officer. In July 2022, Hla Thein and two UEC members were sentenced to prison for violating section 130(a) of the Myanmar Penal Code.

== Members' Qualifications ==
The UEC's members are appointed by the government, and must meet the following qualifications:

- 50 years of age or older
- a good public reputation, as determined by the government
- dignity, integrity and experience
- loyalty to the State and its citizens
- not affiliated to any political parties
- not hold any office or draw compensation as such

=== 2021-2025 members ===
On 2 February 2021, the State Administration Council, the military regime, appointed military-aligned members to the UEC:

1. Thein Soe, Chairman
2. U Aung Moe Myint, Member
3. Than Tun, Member
4. U Kyauk, Member
5. Aung Saw Win, Member
6. Than Win, Member

=== 2016-2020 members ===
The UEC's current members, appointed by the President Htin Kyaw on 30 March 2016.

1. Hla Thein (chairman)
2. Aung Myint (Member)
3. Soe Yae (Member)
4. Tun Khin (Member)
5. Hla Tint (Member)

=== Inaugural members ===
The UEC appointed by the State Peace and Development Council after 2010 election were:

1. Tin Aye (chairman)
2. Myint Naing (Member)
3. Aung Myint (Member)
4. Dr. Myint Kyi (Member)
5. Win Kyi (Member)
6. Nyunt Tin (Member)
7. Win Ko (Member)
8. Tin Tun (Secretary)

Following were appointed as additional members of Union Election Commission later.

1. N Zaw Naung
2. Sai Kham Win
3. Saw Ba Hlaing
4. Ha Kee
5. Dr. Mg Mg Kyi
6. Sai Non Taung
7. Sai Htun Thein and
8. Dr. Sai San Win

== List of chairpersons ==
1. Thein Soe (8 March 2010 – 30 March 2011)
2. Tin Aye (30 March 2011 – 30 March 2016)
3. Hla Thein (30 March 2016 – 2 February 2021)
4. Thein Soe (2 February 2021 – 31 January 2024)
5. Ko Ko (31 January 2024 – 31 July 2025)
6. Than Soe (31 July 2025 – Present)

== Controversy ==
The UEC has been criticised for its powers to abolish elections in conflict areas.
