= Kayah State Democratic Party =

Kayah State Democratic Party ကရင်နီပြည်နယ်ဒီမိုကရက်တစ်ပါတီ
- Abbreviation: KySDP
- Founded: 2017
- Headquarters: Loikaw, Kayah State
- Ideology: Karenni interests
- Seats in the House of Nationalities: 3 / 224
- Seats in the House of Representatives: 2 / 440
- Seats in the Kayah State Hluttaw: 3 / 20

The Kayah State Democratic Party (KySDP; Burmese: ကရင်နီပြည်နယ်ဒီမိုကရက်တစ်ပါတီ, romanized: karainnepyinaal demokaraattaitparte) is a de-registered political party in Myanmar seeking to represent the interests of the Karenni people. It was founded in 2017 as a merger between the All Nationals' Democracy Party (Kayah State) and Kayah Unity Democracy Party. The KySDP ran 30 candidates in the 2020 general election and won eight seats. On 28 March 2022, KySDP was officially dissolved by the junta-appointed Union Election Commission, along with 39 other parties.
