= National Democratic Force =

National Democratic Force အမျိုးသား ဒီမိုကရေစီ အင်အားစု
- Abbreviation: NDF
- Chairman: Thar Sine
- Vice Chairman: Htet Aung Kyaw
- Founders: Khin Maung Swe; Than Nyein; Thein Nyunt; Win Naing
- Founded: June 2010
- Banned: 9 September 2025
- Split from: National League for Democracy
- Headquarters: Bahan Township, Yangon
- Ideology: Burmese nationalism; Social liberalism (nominal)
- Seats in the Amyotha Hluttaw: 0 / 224
- Seats in the Pyithu Hluttaw: 0 / 440

Party flag

The National Democratic Force (NDF) (Note: Burmese: အမျိုးသား ဒီမိုကရေစီ အင်အားစု, pronounced [ʔəmjóðá dìmòkəɹèsì ʔɪ̀ɰ̃ʔázṵ]) is a political party in Myanmar (Burma). It was founded by former members of the National League for Democracy (NLD) who disagreed with the party leadership's decision to boycott the 2010 general election.

== History ==
The National Democratic Force (NDF) was founded in June 2010 by Khin Maung Swe, Than Nyein, Thein Nyunt, and Win Naing, all of whom were prominent members of the NLD. They formed the party after the NLD executive committee refused to register with the Union Election Commission (UEC) and announced the NLD's intention to boycott the 2010 general election.

The NDF was among the three political parties, together with the Union Solidarity and Development Party (USDP) and the National Unity Party (NUP), to stand in the 2010 general election on a nationwide basis.

The NDF's adoption of the peasant bamboo hat, which is a symbol traditionally used by the NLD, created some controversy. After the 2010 election, Thein Nyunt and Kyi Myint, members of the Pyithu Hluttaw, and Phone Myint Aung, a member of the Amyotha Hluttaw, split from the party and set up the New National Democracy Party.

In December 2011, another member of the Amyotha Hluttaw Myat Nyana Soe, resigned from the party and joined the NLD. After the 2012 by-elections, two NDF MPs, Than Win and Khin Maung Win, also rejoined the NLD.

Party co-founder Than Nyein died of liver cancer at Pinlon Hospital in Yangon on 21 May 2014.

The NDF contested 275 constituencies in the 2015 general election, but failed to win a single seat.

In the aftermath of the military coup on 1 February 2021, the NDF collaborated with the new military junta, and party chairman Khin Maung Swe accepted a position in the State Administration Council.

The NDF planned to compete in the 2025 Myanmar general election. However, the State Security and Peace Commission junta dissolved the NDF on 9 September 2025 for "failing to meet criteria."

== Ideology and beliefs ==
The NDF claims to be a social liberal party that seeks to promote individual freedoms and a market economy with state regulation. The party has stated that it supports civil and human rights, the resolution of ethnic political issues, and the development of liberal democracy and civil society organisations in Myanmar.

However, in the recent years, the NDF has grown close to the military-backed USDP. The party has been described as nationalist and some of its prominent members have expressed their support for the ultranationalist Ma Ba Tha organization. The NDF also backs the State Administration Council, the military junta which seized power in the aftermath of the 2021 military coup.

== Leadership ==
=== Former ===
- Than Nyein, Chairman of the Central Executive Committee (2010–2014)
- Khin Maung Swe Chairman of the Central Executive Committee (2014-2021)
- Win Naing Chairman of the Central Executive Committee (2021)
- Kyaw Thu Ya, Central Youth Leader (2012–2015)
- Kyaw Htet, Central Youth Leader (2015-2019)
