= Constitutional Tribunal of Myanmar =

Court in Myanmar

Constitutional Tribunal of the Union
- နိုင်ငံတော်ဖွဲ့စည်းပုံအခြေခံဥပဒေဆိုင်ရာခုံရုံး (Burmese)
- Established: 31 March 2011; 15 years ago
- Jurisdiction: Myanmar
- Location: Office No. 54, Ottarathiri Township, Naypyidaw
- Composition method: Mixed executive/legislative selection
- Authorised by: Constitution of Myanmar
- Judge term length: 5 years
- Number of positions: 9
- Type of tribunal: Constitutional court
- Website: www.constitutionaltribunal.gov.mm

Chair
- Currently: Aung Zaw Thein
- Since: 3 August 2023

The Constitutional Tribunal of the Union (Burmese: နိုင်ငံတော်ဖွဲ့စည်းပုံအခြေခံဥပဒေဆိုင်ရာခုံရုံး) is the constitutional court of Myanmar under the 2008 Constitution. There is one chairperson and eight members on the Tribunal, who serve five year terms. Members of the tribunal are constitutionally elected proportionally by the President, Pyithu Hluttaw, and Amyotha Hluttaw. However, under the previous military government, members are appointed unilaterally by the junta, the State Administration Council. The members of the Constitutional Tribunal are all required to be legal experts.

Its headquarters is located in Office No. 54, Ottarathiri Township, Nay Pyi Taw City, Myanmar.

== Background ==
In the 1947 Constitution, the Supreme Court decided upon constitutional disputes and interpreted the constitution (subject to article 151). In the 1974 Constitution, only the Pyithu Hluttaw (House of Representatives) had the power of interpretation (according to article 200 and 201). The National Convention was held on 16 September 1993. It agreed on 104 basic principles to be included in the formation of new constitution. All representatives in this Convention agreed to the following basic principles concerning with the establishment of a Constitutional Tribunal - “A Constitutional Tribunal shall be set up to interpret the provisions of the Constitution, to scrutinize whether or not laws enacted by the Pyidaungsu Hluttaw, the Regional Hluttaws, the State Hluttaws and functions of executive authorities of Pyidaungsu, Regions, States and Self-Administered Areas are in conformity with the Constitution. Its function is to decide on disputes relating to the Constitution between Pyidaungsu and Regions, between Pyidaungsu and States, among Regions, among States, and between Regions or States and Self-Administered Areas and among Self-Administered Areas themselves. Its role is to perform other duties prescribed in the Constitution,” as well. In formulation the 2008 Constitution, the Commission drafted the following provisions regarding the Constitutional Tribunal -

- the establishment of a Constitutional Tribunal “Chapter(1), Basic Principles of the Union” (article 46);
- the formation of a Tribunal, tenure, duties and functions, effect of decisions, submitting submissions, impeachment, “Chapter (6), Judicial” (from article 320 to 326);

Hence the 2008 Constitution was enforced in the first meeting of the Pyidaungsu Hluttaw (Union Parliament) which was held on 31 January 2011 and the first Constitutional Tribunal was established on 30, March 2011.

In the aftermath of the 2021 Myanmar coup d'état, on 8 February, the State Administration Council seized control of the tribunal by successfully pressuring all sitting judges to resign and appointing nine new members, including Than Kyaw as chair. The tribunal has since ruled that indefinite military rule complies with the constitution.

== List of chairpersons ==
Chairperson of Constitutional Tribunal of Myanmar (2011 - Present)
No	Name	Appointer	Term of Office	
No	Name	Appointer	Start	End
1	Thein Soe	Thein Sein	30 March 2011	6 September 2012
2	Mya Thein	Thein Sein	26 February 2013	29 March 2016
3	Myo Nyunt	Htin Kyaw	30 March 2016	8 February 2021
4	Than Kyaw	State Administration Council	8 February 2021	14 March 2022
5	Tha Htay	State Administration Council	14 March 2022	3 August 2023
6	Aung Zaw Thein	State Administration Council	3 August 2023	10 April 2026
6	Aung Zaw Thein	Min Aung Hlaing	10 April 2026	Incumbent

== Members ==
=== State Administration Council ===
All members were appointed by the State Administration Council on 14-3-2022

1. U Tha Htay (Chair)
2. Nyan Tun
3. Khin Maung Oo
4. Saw Sanlin
5. Myo Chit
6. Kyaw San
7. Kyaw Min
8. Marlar Aung
9. Daw Nan Sandar San
