= National Unity Party (Myanmar) =

National Unity Party တိုင်းရင်းသားစည်းလုံးညီညွတ်ရေးပါတီ
- Abbreviation: NUP (English) တစည (Burmese)
- Chairman: U Han Shwe
- Secretary-General: U Tun Yi
- Vice Chairman and Spokesman: U Thein Tun
- Associate Secretaries: U Ne Win and U Nyunt Tin
- Founded: 24 September 1988 (38 years ago)
- Preceded by: Burma Socialist Programme Party
- Headquarters: Bahan Township, Yangon
- Newspaper: National News Journal
- Membership (2015): 500,000
- Ideology: Federalism (claimed); Burmese nationalism; Populism; Social market economy
- Colours: Sky blue
- Amyotha Hluttaw: 16 / 224
- Pyithu Hluttaw: 4 / 440
- State and Regional Hluttaws: 0 / 880

Party flag

The National Unity Party (NUP) (Note: Burmese: တိုင်းရင်းသားစည်းလုံးညီညွတ်ရေးပါတီ Burmese pronunciation: [táɪɰ̃jɪ́ɰ̃ðá sílóʊɰ̃ ɲìɲʊʔ jé pàtì], abbr. တစည) is a political party in Myanmar (Burma). It is the successor to the Burma Socialist Programme Party (BSPP), which ruled the country from 1962 to 1988. The party's headquarters are in Bahan Township, Yangon.

== History ==
The Burma Socialist Programme Party changed its name to the NUP on 24 September 1988.

The NUP contested the 1990 general election and was seen as a proxy party of the Tatmadaw (military) and the main rival to Aung San Suu Kyi's National League for Democracy. The NUP was defeated in the election, but the results were not recognised by the Tatmadaw and subsequently voided.

The NUP played a relatively minor role in Burmese politics after 1990 and maintained close ties with the Tatmadaw during the period of military rule under the State Peace and Development Council, which ended in 2011. Before 2011, the party membership consisted mainly of former Ne Win loyalists, former BSPP members, and top military commanders.

The party contested the 2010 general election as the main challenger to the pro-military Union Solidarity and Development Party (USDP); the NUP had nominated 999 parliamentary candidates nationwide (contesting at both national and regional levels), second only to the 1,100 candidates nominated by the USDP. The NUP joined other opposition parties in accusing the USDP of vote rigging after the USDP won a supermajority of the seats in a landslide victory. Twelve NUP candidates were elected to the Pyithu Hluttaw, five to the Amyotha Hluttaw, and 46 to the State and Regional Hluttaws.

The NUP ran 763 candidates in the 2015 general election, all of whom lost except for one in Kachin State who was elected to the Amyotha Hluttaw.

The NUP ran in the 2025 election, gaining 16 seats in the Pyidaungsu Hluttaw.

== Ideology ==
The NUP describes itself as federalist, nationalist, and populist. It advocates the implementation of a social market economy modelled after the system used in Germany (also known as "Rhine capitalism").

Despite the NUP's claims that it supports federalism, most of its members are former BSPP officials and military personnel, both of whom are known for their hardline anti-federalist, conservative, statist, and Burmese nationalist stances. The BSPP was well known for its opposition to federalism; the party was founded by Ne Win following his 1962 coup to prevent the ascension of a proposed federal amendment, which would have provided greater autonomy to ethnic minorities.

== Symbols ==
From left to right:
- "Resistance flag" used during World War II (1945)
- Flag of the Burma Socialist Programme Party (1962–1988)
- First flag of the National Unity Party (1988–2016)

The NUP adopted a new flag in 2016, changing the flag's colour from red to sky blue and adding the party logo to the centre. Regarding the change, U Han Shwe of the party's central committee (who later became the party's chairman in 2021) said, "We have traditionally used a red flag with three stars to represent the party. However, the colour of our party has always been sky blue, so now we are changing [the flag] to that colour. In the new flag, the party's logo is included. ... Previously we had to explain that the red flag with three stars was our party flag. Now that the logo has been added to the flag, it is clear that this is the flag of the National Unity Party."

The current flag of NUP is a sky blue field with three white stars charged in the upper hoist and the party logo charged in the centre. Its proportion is 5:9. The first white star in the upper hoist honours the "resistance flag" used by the anti-Japanese resistance movement in Burma during World War II and now a symbol of Burmese national liberation. The second white star in the upper hoist represents efforts by the Burmese to build a socialist society. The third white star in the upper hoist symbolises the reconstruction of national unity between Myanmar's ethnic groups. The sky blue background represents nobility, steadfastness, peace, calmness, and development. The stars' white colour symbolises purity, steadfastness, righteousness, and loyalty. In the party logo, the paddy ears and pinion represent peasants, workers, and the Burmese nation itself, while the fourteen equal-sized white stars symbolise the unity and equality of Myanmar's fourteen states and regions.

== Chairmanship ==
The party's first chairman was U Thar Kyaw, a former member of the Council of State, a former minister and a former soldier who had joined the Tatmadaw in World War II, when it was known as the Burma Independence Army. U Thar Kyaw died on 9 May 2005, and the party's general secretary U Tun Yi, formerly the Deputy Commander of the Tatmadaw, succeeded. U Tun Yi died on 4 April 2014. The general secretary U Than Tin, a former brigadier general from the army, the former minister of the Ministry of Mines, a former deputy prime minister during the socialist period and a writer, became the party chairman on 30 April 2014. U Than Tin died on 14 January 2021 and vice-chairman U Han Shwe was elected to succeed him on 18 May 2021.

=== List of chairmen ===
1. U Thar Kyaw (ဦးသာကျော်), 24 September 1988 – 9 May 2005
2. U Tun Yi (ဦးထွန်းရီ), 9 May 2005 – 4 April 2014
3. U Than Tin (ဦးသန်းတင်), 30 April 2014 – 14 January 2021
4. U Han Shwe (ဦးဟန်ရွှေ), 18 May 2021 – present

== Election results ==
=== House of Nationalities (Amyotha Hluttaw) ===
Election	Leader	Total seats won	Total votes	Share of votes	+/–	Government
2010	Tun Yi	5 / 224	4,302,082	19.46%	▲5	Opposition
2015	U Than Tin	1 / 224	437,361	1.93%	▼4	Opposition
2020	U Than Tin	0 / 224	64,193	0.24%	▼1	Not recognised
2025–26	U Han Shwe	16 / 224	2,081,571	16.46%	▲4	TBA

=== House of Representatives (Pyithu Hluttaw) ===
Election	Leader	Total seats won	Total votes	Share of votes	+/–	Government
1990	U Thar Kyaw	10 / 492	2,805,559	21.2%	▲10	Not recognised
2010	Tun Yi	12 / 440	4,060,802	19.4%	▲2	Opposition
2015	U Than Tin	0 / 440	418,443	1.87%	▼12	Extra-parliamentary
2020	U Than Tin	0 / 440	126,725	0.48%	0	Not recognised
2025–26	U Han Shwe	4 / 440	1,744,943	13.41%	▲4	TBA

=== By-election ===
Election	Seats up for election	Seats contested	Contested seats won	+/–
2012	37 (Pyithu) / 5 (Amyotha)	18 (Pyithu) / 4 (Amyotha)	0 (Pyithu) / 0 (Amyotha)	Steady
