= Chaungzon Township =

Chaungzon Township ချောင်းဆုံမြို့နယ်
- Township
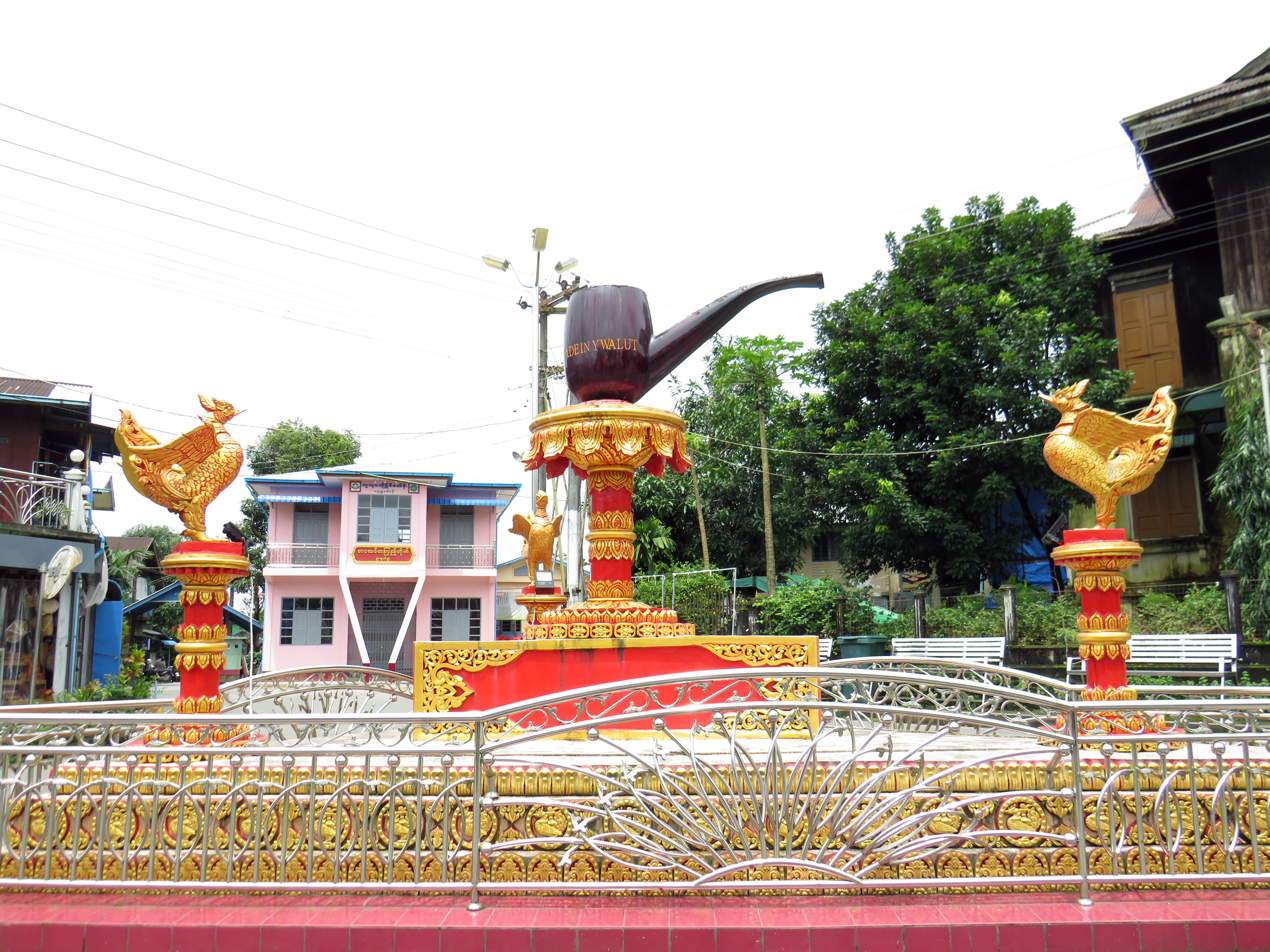

- Location in Mawlamyine district
- Coordinates: 16°23′20″N 97°32′11″E
- Country: Myanmar
- State: Mon State
- District: Mawlamyine District
- Elevation: 25 ft (7.6 m)
- Time zone: UTC+6:30 (MST)

Chaungzon Township (Burmese: ချောင်းဆုံမြို့နယ်) is a township of Mawlamyine District in the Mon State of Myanmar. Chaungzon is the capital of Chaungzon township.
