= Hla Thein =

Burmese long-distance runner (born 1944)

Personal information
- Nationality: Burmese
- Born: 25 April 1944 (age 81) Pon, British Burma

Sport
- Sport: Long-distance running
- Event: Marathon

Hla Thein (born 25 April 1944) is a Burmese long-distance runner. He competed in the marathon at the 1968 Summer Olympics and the 1972 Summer Olympics.
