= National League for Democracy =

Political party in Myanmar

National League for Democracy အမျိုးသားဒီမိုကရေစီ အဖွဲ့ချုပ်ပါတီ
- Abbreviation: NLD
- General Secretary: Aung San Suu Kyi
- Founders: Aung Shwe; Tin Oo; Kyi Maung; Aung San Suu Kyi; Aung Gyi
- Founded: 27 September 1988 (38 years, 32 days)
- Banned: 28 March 2023 (3 years, 215 days)
- Headquarters: 97B West Shwe Gon Daing Road, Bahan Township, Yangon
- Ideology: Liberalism; Social liberalism; Historically: Social democracy
- Political position: Centre
- Regional affiliation: Council of Asian Liberals and Democrats (observer)
- Colours: Red

Party flag

Website
- nld-official.org (dead) (7 March 2021 archive)

The National League for Democracy (Burmese: အမျိုးသား ဒီမိုကရေစီ အဖွဲ့ချုပ်, IPA: [ʔəmjóðá dìmòkəɹèsì ʔəpʰwḛdʑoʊʔ]; abbr. NLD; Burmese abbr. ဒီချုပ်) is a deregistered liberal democratic political party in Myanmar (formerly Burma). It became the country's ruling party after a landslide victory in the 2015 general election but was overthrown in a coup d'état in February 2021 following another landslide election victory in 2020.

Founded on 27 September 1988, the NLD has become one of the most influential parties in Myanmar's pro-democracy movement. Aung San Suu Kyi, the former State Counsellor of Myanmar, serves as its leader. The party won a substantial parliamentary majority in the 1990 Myanmar general election. However, the ruling military junta refused to recognise the result. On 6 May 2010, the party was declared illegal and ordered to be disbanded by the junta after refusing to register for the elections slated for November 2010. In November 2011, the NLD announced its intention to register as a political party to contest future elections, and Myanmar's Union Election Commission approved their application for registration on 13 December 2011.

In the 2012 by-elections, the NLD contested 44 of the 45 available seats, winning 43, with its only loss being in one seat to the SNDP. Party leader Aung San Suu Kyi won the seat of Kawhmu. In the 2015 general election, the NLD won a supermajority in both houses of the Assembly, paving the way for the country's first non-military president in 54 years. The NLD is an observer party of the Council of Asian Liberals and Democrats.

On 21 May 2021, the junta-controlled Union Election Commission (UEC) announced plans to permanently dissolve the NLD, though the junta later temporarily reversed this decision. In January 2023, the junta enacted a new electoral law designed to favor the Union Solidarity and Development Party (USDP), the military's electoral proxy, leading the NLD to announce that it would not re-register as a political party. On 28 March 2023, the UEC dissolved the NLD for failing to register, a decision which the NLD rejected as illegitimate.

== History ==
=== 1990s: Beginnings ===
The NLD was formed in the aftermath of the 8888 Uprising, a series of protests in favour of democracy which took place in 1990 and ended when the military again took control of the country in a coup. It formed under the leadership of Aung San Suu Kyi, daughter of Aung San, a pivotal figure in the Burmese independence movement of the 1940s. She was recruited by concerned democracy advocates. The first founding chair is Brigadier General Aung Gyi and Aung San Suu Kyi is the General Secretary of the Party.

In the 1990 parliamentary elections, the party took 59% of the vote and won 392 out of 492 contested seats, compared to 10 seats won by the governing National Unity Party. However, the ruling military junta (formerly SLORC, later known as the State Peace and Development Council or SPDC) did not let the party form a government. Soon after the election, the party was repressed and in 1996 Suu Kyi was placed under house arrest. This was her status for 16 of the following 21 years until her release on 13 November 2010. A number of senior NLD members escaped arrest, however, and formed the National Coalition Government of the Union of Burma (NCGUB).

=== 2000s: Continued repression under military rule ===
In 2001, the government permitted NLD office branches to re-open throughout Burma and freed some imprisoned members. In May 2002, NLD's general secretary, Aung San Suu Kyi, was again released from house arrest. She and other NLD members made numerous trips throughout the country and received support from the public. However, on their trip to Depayin township in May 2003, dozens of NLD members were shot and killed in a military-sponsored massacre. Its general secretary, Aung San Suu Kyi, and the party's vice president, U Tin Oo, were again arrested.

From 2004, the government prohibited the activities of the party. In 2006, many members resigned from NLD, citing harassment and pressure from the Tatmadaw (Armed Forces) and the Union Solidarity and Development Association. In October 2008, following the crackdown on the aftermath of the Saffron Revolution a bomb exploded in the Htan Chauk Pin quarter of the Shwepyitha Township of Yangon, near the office of the military junta-backed Union Solidarity and Development Association killing one. The victim was identified as Thet Oo Win, a former Buddhist monk who participated in the Saffron Revolution, was killed while improvising the bomb at his own residence. The junta blamed the National League for Democracy party of planting that bomb, but experts believed at the time that the opposition was not in a position to carry out such acts amidst the tightly controlled security environment. The junta detained several members of the party in connection with the bombings that year.

=== 2010s: Transition to power-sharing with the military ===
The NLD boycotted the general election held in November 2010 because many of its most prominent members were barred from standing. The laws were designed in such a way that the party would have had to expel these members to be allowed to run. This decision, taken in May, led to the party being officially banned. A splinter group named the National Democratic Force broke away from the NLD to contest the elections, but secured less than 3% of the vote. The election was won in a landslide by the military-backed Union Solidarity and Development Party (USDP), and was described by U.S. President Barack Obama as "stolen".

Discussions were held between Suu Kyi and the Burmese government during 2011, which led to a number of official gestures to meet her demands. In October, around a tenth of Myanmar's political prisoners were freed in an amnesty and trade unions were legalised.

On 18 November 2011, following a meeting of its leaders, the NLD announced its intention to re-register as a political party in order to contend in 48 by-elections necessitated by the promotion of Union Solidarity and Development Party MPs who had been appointed as ministers. Following the decision, Suu Kyi held a telephone conference with Barack Obama, in which it was agreed that U.S. Secretary of State Hillary Clinton would make a visit to Myanmar, a move received with caution by Burma's ally China. The visit took place on 30 November. European Union Vice President Catherine Ashton welcomed the possibility of "fair and transparent" elections in Burma, and said that the EU would be reviewing its foreign policy towards the country.

The NLD contested the all available seats during the 2012 Myanmar by-elections. The election was marred with skepticism over whether the results would be legitimate, and the NLD reported issues with campaign conduct and other irregularities in the election's lead-up. NLD candidates, including Suu Kyi, won 43 of the 45 available seats at both the national and regional levels. Its main rival, the USDP also contested all available seats, losing all but one seat.

During preparations for the 2015 elections, the party was criticised for discouraging Muslim candidates, a step interpreted as a desire to maintain relations with hardline Buddhist monks such as the Ma Ba Tha association. The NLD secured 85% of all available parliamentary seats during the election.

Ko Ni, a legal advisor to the party and a Muslim, was assassinated in January 2017. The party was criticised by international media outlets for its lack of response to renewed military-led violence against the Rohingya beginning in 2016, as well as for "doing little to address the country’s weak rule of law, corrupt judiciary, or impunity for security force abuses" with the power they had (although security institutions remain dominated by the military).

=== 2020s-present: Return to military rule ===
The NLD won the 2020 Myanmar general election by a larger margin than in 2015, securing the mandate to form a new government. By contrast, the military-backed Union Solidarity and Development Party lost 8 additional seats in both chambers of the national legislature. Domestic and international election observers deemed the election results credible, noting no major irregularities. Nonetheless, the military claimed the vote was fraudulent, citing 8.6 million irregularities in voter lists. On 28 January 2021, the Union Election Commission rejected the military's fraud allegations, unable to corroborate the military's claims.

During the 2021 Myanmar coup d'état on 1 February, the military quickly mobilised to key NLD leaders, including Suu Kyi, President Win Myint, and 400 MP-elects, who were all in Naypyidaw to be sworn into office the following day. On 4 February 70 NLD MPs took an oath of office, in clear defiance of the coup. In the succeeding weeks, the military junta continued arresting hundreds of NLD members, most of whom were arrested under the pretext of participating in anti-coup protests. As of March 2023, 1,232 NLD members have been jailed (including 80 MP-elects), while at least 84 NLD members have died in custody. The NLD rejected the military's legal basis for the staging a coup.

Post-coup, NLD offices were occupied and raided by police authorities, starting on 2 February. Documents, computers and laptops were forcibly seized, and the NLD called these raids unlawful. On 9 February, police raided the NLD headquarters in Yangon. On 21 May 2021, the junta-controlled Union Election Commission (UEC) announced plans to permanently dissolve the NLD, though the junta later reversed this decision, with spokesman Zaw Min Tun saying that the NLD will decide whether to stand in the next general election. After the junta enacted a new electoral law in January 2023 designed to favor the Union Solidarity and Development Party (USDP), the military's electoral proxy, the NLD announced it would not re-register as a political party and would not recognize the results of any election held by the junta. On 28 March 2023, the UEC dissolved the NLD, which, in turn, challenged the decision saying that the UEC has no legitimacy as the junta itself "is by no means legal".

On 27 November 2025, U Kyi Toe, a member of the NLD's Central Information Committee was released from Insein prison as part of an amnesty granted by the State Security and Peace Commission junta.

== Ideology and political positions ==
The party advocates a non-violent movement towards multi-party democracy in Myanmar, which was under military rule from 1962 to 2011. The party also claims to support human rights (including broad-based freedom of speech), the rule of law, and national reconciliation. The NLD is described as liberal, democratic-liberal, liberal-conservative, and social-liberal. The NLD supports populism and protectionist economic policies. Historically, the NLD has been a social-democratic party. It has also been described as either centrist or not having a rigid ideology.

Aung San Suu Kyi also claimed amendments to the constitution of 2008, drafted with the input of the armed forces, such as the mandatory granting of 25% of seats in parliament to appointed military representatives, are undemocratic.

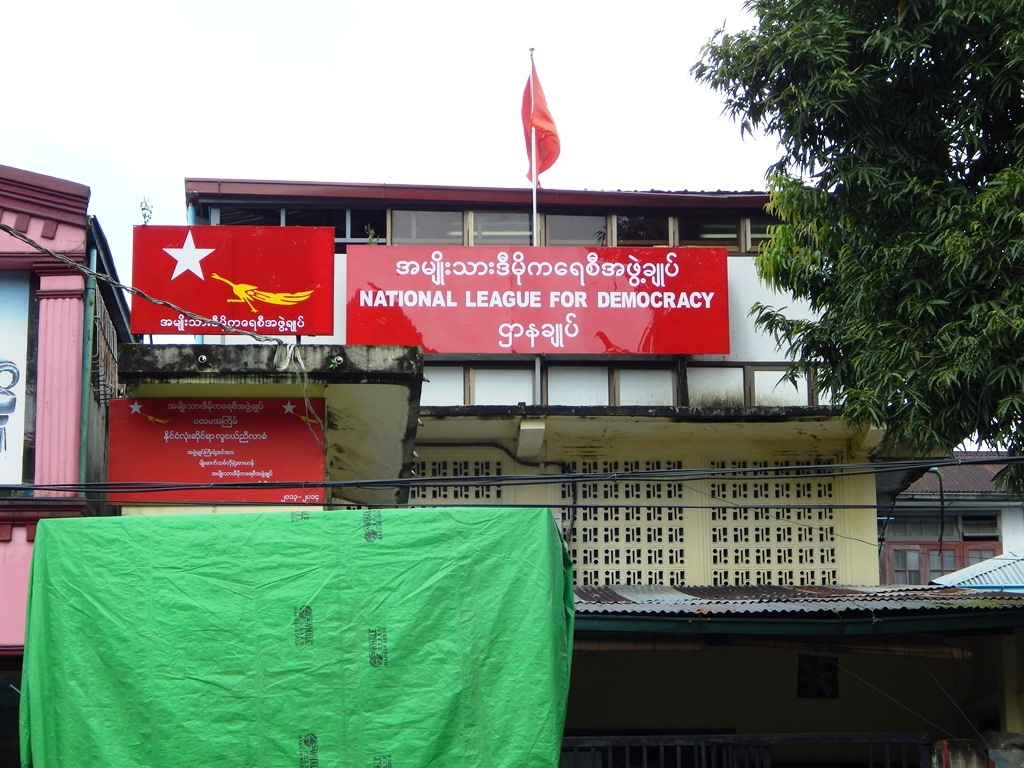
National League for Democracy's headquarters in Yangon (before reconstruction)

== Party symbols ==
The party flag features the peacock, a prominent symbol of Myanmar. The dancing peacock (the peacock in courtship or in display of its feathers) was frequently featured in Burmese monarchic flags as well as other nationalist symbols in the country. The fighting peacock is associated with the decades-long democratic struggle against military dictatorship in the country. The latter closely resembles a green peafowl, as it has a tufted crest. The NLD party symbol is adopted from the Myanmar (Burmese) Student Union flag. This student union organised since the uprising against British colonial rule in Burma, years before the independence of Burma in 1948, had played a major political role in Burma and Aung San Suu Kyi's late father Bogyoke Aung San (General Aung San) was one of the former presidents of the Rangoon University Student Union.

The party emblem is a traditional bamboo hat (ခမောက်).

== Election results ==
=== Burmese Constitutional Committee ===
Election	Total seats won	Total votes	Share of votes	Outcome of election	Note	Election leader
1990	392 / 492	7,930,841	59.9%	▲392	Not recognised	Aung San Suu Kyi

=== House of Nationalities (Amyotha Hluttaw) ===
Election	Total seats won	Total votes	Share of votes	Outcome of election	Note	Election leader
2010	0 / 224	—	—	—	Boycotted	Aung San Suu Kyi
2012 (by-election)	5 / 6	—	—	▲5	Opposition	Aung San Suu Kyi
2015	135 / 224	13,100,673	57.68	▲130	Majority government	Aung San Suu Kyi
2020	138 / 224	18,259,248	68.31	▲3	Not recognised	Aung San Suu Kyi

=== House of Representatives (Pyithu Hluttaw) ===
Election	Total seats won	Total votes	Share of votes	Outcome of election	Note	Election leader
2010	0 / 440	—	—	—	Boycotted	Aung San Suu Kyi
2012 (by-election)	37 / 40	—	—	▲37	Opposition	Aung San Suu Kyi
2015	255 / 440	12,821,899	57.20	▲218	Majority government	Aung San Suu Kyi
2020	258 / 440	18,146,943	68.04	▲3	Not recognised	Aung San Suu Kyi

=== State and Regional Hluttaws ===
Election	Total seats won	Total votes	Share of votes	Outcome of election	Note	Election leader
2015	476 / 850	—	—	▲476		Aung San Suu Kyi
2020	501 / 880	—	—	▲25		Aung San Suu Kyi

== Women's Committee ==
NLD Women's Committee (Burmese: အမျိုးသားဒီမိုကရေစီအဖွဲ့ချုပ် အမျိုးသမီး ကော်မတီ) is the committee of NLD women and provided legal and social assistance to women in need. Women's Work Committees have been formed at all administrative levels, including region and state, ward, and village. The chairman of the Central Women's Committee is May Win Myint.

No	Name	Duties
1.	May Win Myint	Chairperson
2.	Zin Mar Aung	Secretary
3.	Khin Khin Phyu	Member
4.	Shwe Pone	Member
5.	Lat Lat	Member
6.	Thet Htar Nwe	Member
7.	Thandar	Member
8.	Than Than Aye	Member
9.	Aye Aye Mar	Member
10.	Aye Mu (or) Shar Mee	Member

== Bibliography ==
- Houtman, Gustaaf. Daigaku, Tōkyō Gaikokugo. Kenkyūjo, Ajia Afurika Gengo Bunka. Mental culture in Burmese crisis politics: Aung San Suu Kyi and the National League for Democracy. ILCAA, 1999. ISBN 978-4-87297-748-6.
